= Olifants Water Management Area =

Olifants Water Management Area is coded 4 and includes the Elands, Wilge, Steelpoort and Olifants rivers, covering these dams:

- Blyderivierpoort Dam - Blyde River
- Bronkhorstspruit Dam - Bronkhorstspruit River
- Buffelskloof Dam - Waterval River
- Flag Boshielo Dam - Olifants River
- Klaserie Dam - Klaserie River
- Loskop Dam - Olifants River
- Middelburg Dam - Little Olifants River
- Ohrigstad Dam - Ohrigstad River
- Rhenosterkop Dam - Elands River
- Rust de Winter Dam - Elands River
- Tonteldoos Dam - Tonteldoos River
- Tours Dam - Ngwabitsi River
- Vlugkraal Dam - Vlugkraal River
- Witbank Dam - Olifants River
