= De Hoop Dam (Limpopo) =

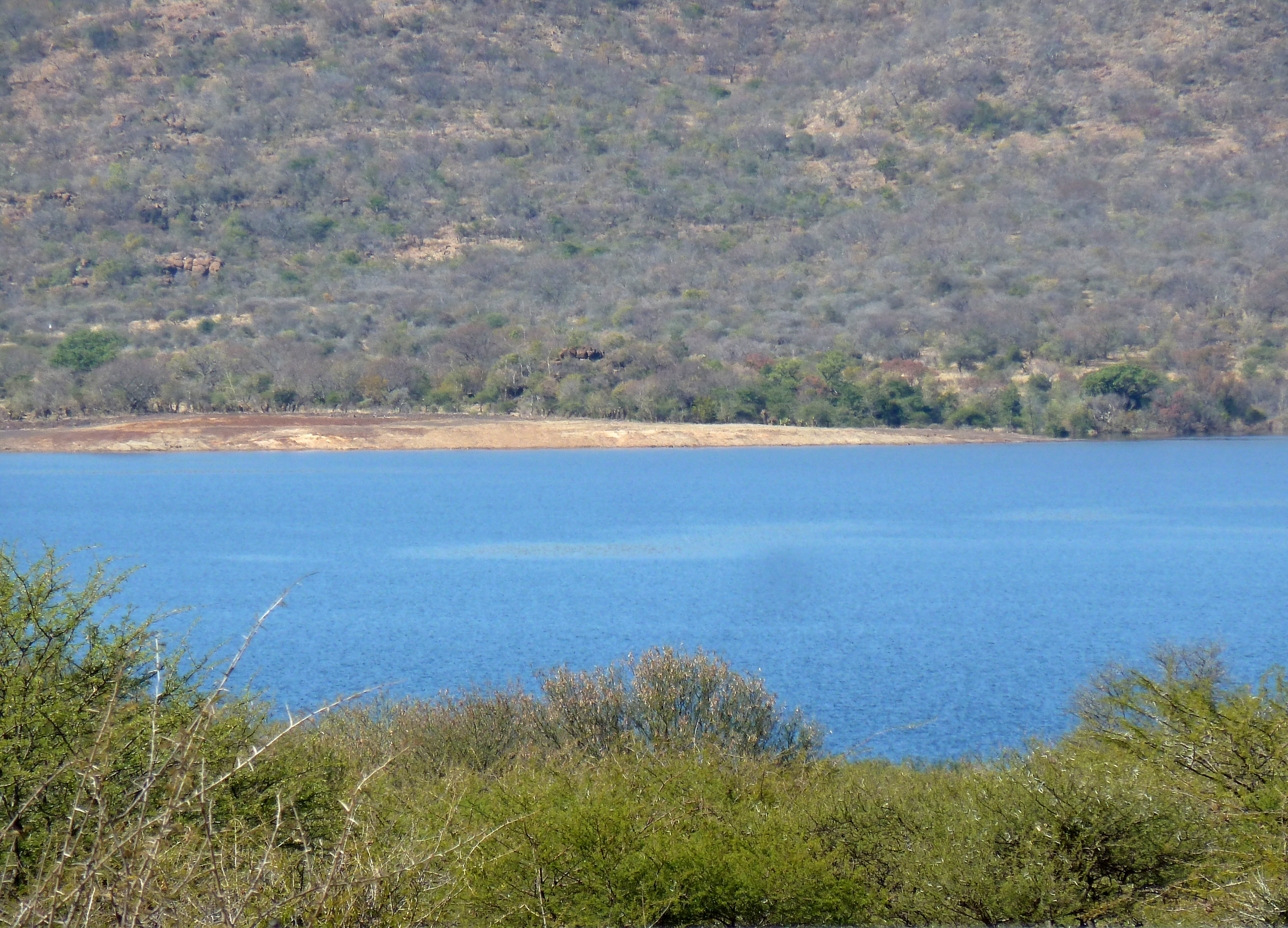
- View on a small section of the reservoir
- Interactive map of De Hoop Dam
- Location: Limpopo, South Africa
- Coordinates: 24°57′27″S 29°57′23″E
- Opening date: 2014
- Operator: Department of Water Affairs

Dam and spillways
- Impounds: Steelpoort River
- Height: 81 m (266 ft)
- Length: 1,000 m (3,300 ft)

Reservoir
- Total capacity: 347,600,000 m^{3} (281,800 acre⋅ft)
- Surface area: 1,690 ha (4,200 acres)

The De Hoop Dam is a gravity dam on the Steelpoort River, near Burgersfort, Limpopo, South Africa. Its purpose is to enable the extraction of rich mineral deposits in the eastern Limpopo province, and to supply water to towns, industries and communities in the Sekhukhune district, where service delivery was of a poor standard.

The completion of the dam was delayed by four years (2010 to 2014) due to supply chain problems, technical and equipment problems, deficient environmental impact studies, resettlement of families in the area, and labour strikes.

The flagship dam in the Olifants system, South Africa's largest dam since the 1970s, was developed by the Department of Water Affairs. The project of R3,4 billion involved innovative solutions in energy dissipation and the use of roller-compacted concrete, for which the department received a Fulton award.

It was the second phase of the Olifants River Water Resources Development Programme (ORWRDP), the only viable solution for water delivery to the Nebo plateau, where some 800,000 people are resident. The first phase, completed in 2006, included capacity improvements to the Flag Boshielo Dam.

== See also ==
- List of reservoirs and dams in South Africa
- List of rivers of South Africa
