= Spruit =

Spruit may refer to:

== People ==
- Fortunato Antonio Spruit (1880-1943), Dutch Catholic missionary
- Henk Spruit (astrophysicist) (born 1948), Dutch astrophysicist, University of Amsterdam professor, winner of the 2012 George Ellery Hale Prize
- Henk Spruit (conductor) (1906-1998), Dutch conductor

== Rivers and locations in Southern Africa ==
- Bamboes Spruit (North West), river in North West province of South Africa
- Braamfontein Spruit, river in Johannesburg
- Bronkhorst Spruit, river in Gauteng
- Karnmelk Spruit, river in Eastern Cape
- Rocky Spruit, village in Zimbabwe

== See also ==
- Spruyt, a Belgian and Dutch surname
