= Zelotes lotzi =

Lotz's Dark Ground Spider

Conservation status
- Least Concern (SANBI Red List)

Scientific classification
- Kingdom: Animalia
- Phylum: Arthropoda
- Subphylum: Chelicerata
- Class: Arachnida
- Order: Araneae
- Infraorder: Araneomorphae
- Family: Gnaphosidae
- Genus: Zelotes
- Species: Z. lotzi

Binomial name
- Zelotes lotzi FitzPatrick, 2007

Species of spider

Zelotes lotzi is a species of spider in the family Gnaphosidae. It is endemic to South Africa and is commonly known as Lotz's dark ground spider.

== Distribution ==
Zelotes lotzi has been sampled from three South African provinces: Free State, Limpopo, and Mpumalanga. The species occurs at altitudes ranging from 895 to 1,346 m above sea level.

Collection localities include Boshof, Tussen-die-Riviere Nature Reserve, Dendron, and Loskop Dam Nature Reserve.

== Habitat and ecology ==
Zelotes lotzi are free-running ground spiders found under stones during the day. The species has been sampled from the Grassland and Savanna biomes.

== Conservation ==
Zelotes lotzi is listed as Least Concern by the South African National Biodiversity Institute due to its wide geographic range. There are no significant threats to the species, and it is protected in Tussen-die-Riviere Nature Reserve and Loskop Dam Nature Reserve.

== Etymology ==
The species is named after arachnologist Leon N. Lotz.

== Taxonomy ==
The species was described by FitzPatrick in 2007 from Boshof. The species is known from both sexes.
