= Moses River =

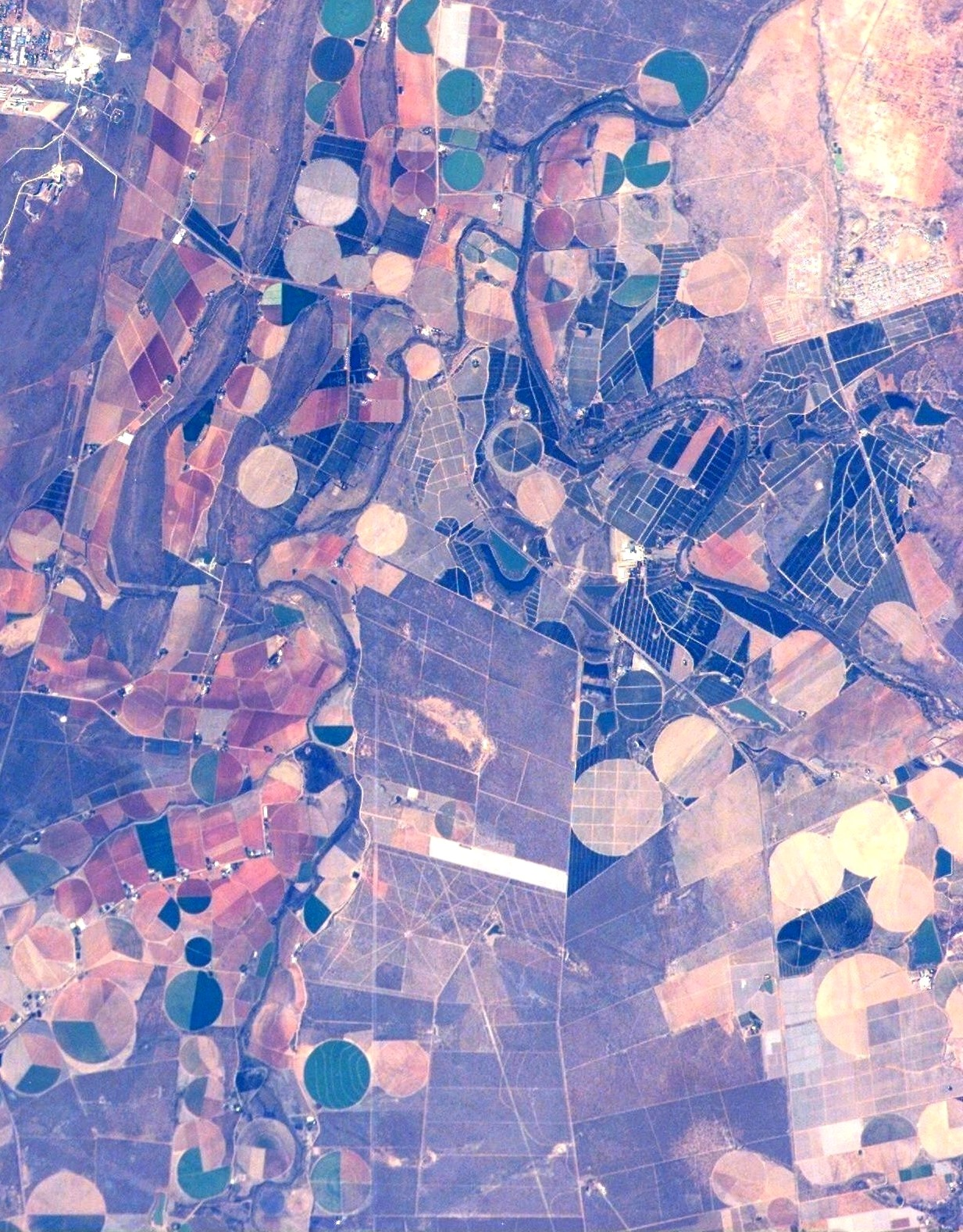
- Its confluence with the Olifants, as seen from space

- Location of the Moses River's mouth

Location
- Country: South Africa
- State: Mpumalanga and Limpopo Provinces

Physical characteristics
- Mouth: Olifants River
  - location: Limpopo Province
  - coordinates: 24°59′39″S 29°21′24″E

The Moses River is a smaller river in Mpumalanga and Limpopo Provinces, South Africa. It flows northwards and is a tributary of the Olifants River, joining its left bank near Marble Hall, Limpopo.

== See also ==
- List of rivers of South Africa
