= Tongwane River =

Coordinates: 24°13′15″S 29°53′52″E

- Location of the Tongwane River's mouth

Location
- Country: South Africa
- State: Limpopo Province

Physical characteristics
- Mouth: Olifants River
  - location: Limpopo Province

The Tongwane River is a river in Limpopo Province, South Africa. It flows southward and is a tributary of the Olifants River, joining it southeast of Polokwane.

The Tongwane River was possibly named after Mohlatlole warriors who fought battles around Mafefe in Limpopo in the 1500s.

== See also ==
- List of rivers of South Africa
