= Makhutswi River =

- Location of the Makhutswi River's mouth

Location
- Country: South Africa
- State: Limpopo Province

Physical characteristics
- Mouth: Olifants River
  - location: Limpopo Province
  - coordinates: 24.1824°S 30.8181°E

The Makhutswi River is a short river in Limpopo Province, South Africa. It flows northeastwards and is a tributary of the Olifants River, joining it in its central basin.

== See also ==
- List of rivers of South Africa
