= Sidespot barb =

Conservation status
- Least Concern (IUCN 3.1)

Scientific classification
- Kingdom: Animalia
- Phylum: Chordata
- Class: Actinopterygii
- Division: Teleostei
- Order: Cypriniformes
- Family: Cyprinidae
- Subfamily: Smiliogastrinae
- Genus: Enteromius
- Species: E. neefi

Binomial name
- Enteromius neefi Greenwood, 1962

Synonyms
- Barbus neefi

Species of fish

Sidespot barb (Enteromius neefi) is a species of cyprinid fish in the genus Enteromius. It has a disjunct distribution with the northern population in the upper Zambezi, Kafue, and upper Congo River systems in Zambia and Democratic Republic of the Congo, while the southern population is found in the tributaries of the Limpopo River and Steelpoort River. The southern population may be a separate species.

== Taxonomy and identification ==
The sidespot barb was first described by Humphry Greenwood in 1962 as Barbus neefi, based on 17 specimens collected in 1960 from the Kabompo River, a tributary of the upper Zambezi in Zambia. It belongs to a group of small African barbs commonly known as the goldie barbs, which are characterised by compact bodies, two pairs of barbels and bright golden breeding coloration in males. The species can be distinguished by its dark spots near the bases of the anal and pectoral fins, larger spots along the body and thin, wavy parallel lines following the rows of scales on its flanks.

A taxonomic study published in 2024 used genetic analyses and morphological comparisons to distinguish the southern populations previously assigned to E. neefi from the northern populations. The researchers described the southern fish as a separate species, Enteromius niggie, and restricted E. neefi in the strict sense to populations associated with the Kabompo and Lualaba river systems. Distinguishing characteristics included differences in the extent of the wavy markings below the lateral line and the presence of prominent dark spots along the dorsal midline.
