= Nkumpi River =

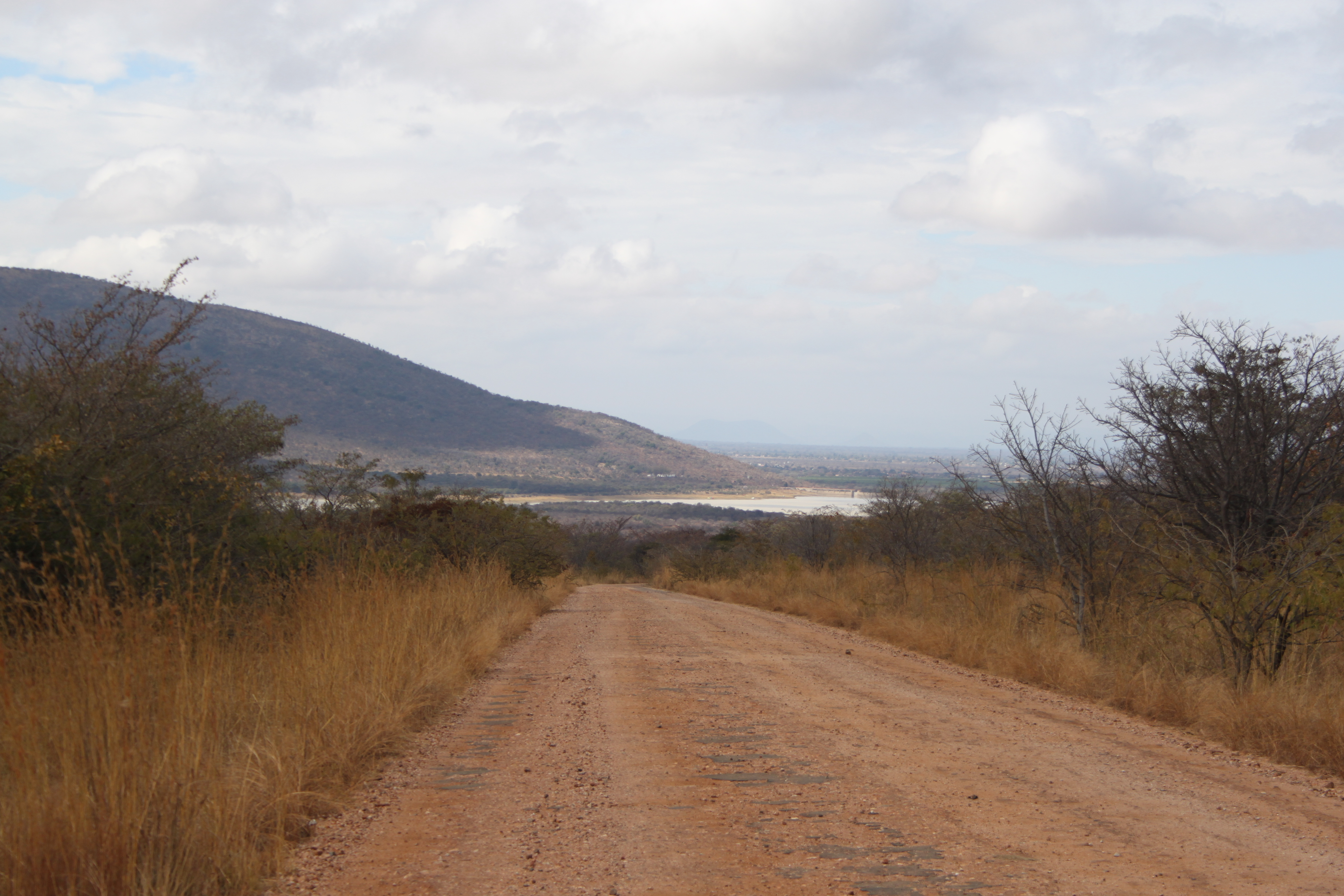

- Location of the Nkumpi River's mouth

Location
- Country: South Africa
- State: Limpopo Province

Physical characteristics
- Mouth: Olifants River
  - location: Limpopo Province
  - coordinates: 24°33′41″S 29°32′06″E

The Nkumpi River is a smallish river in central Limpopo Province, South Africa. It flows southeastwards and is a tributary of the Olifants River, joining the left bank in the river's central basin.

== Geography ==
The Nkumpi River flows through the Lepelle-Nkumpi Local Municipality in Limpopo Province. It is situated in a predominantly rural area where land use includes settlements, agricultural activity, and infrastructure development.

== Environmental and planning significance ==
The Nkumpi River is identified in municipal development frameworks as part of the natural environmental assets within the Lepelle-Nkumpi area. These frameworks highlight the importance of rivers in supporting ecological sustainability, land-use planning, and potential tourism development in the municipality.

== Sources ==
Source coordinates: 24.3049°S 29.3195°E

== See also ==
- List of rivers of South Africa
