= Timbavati River =

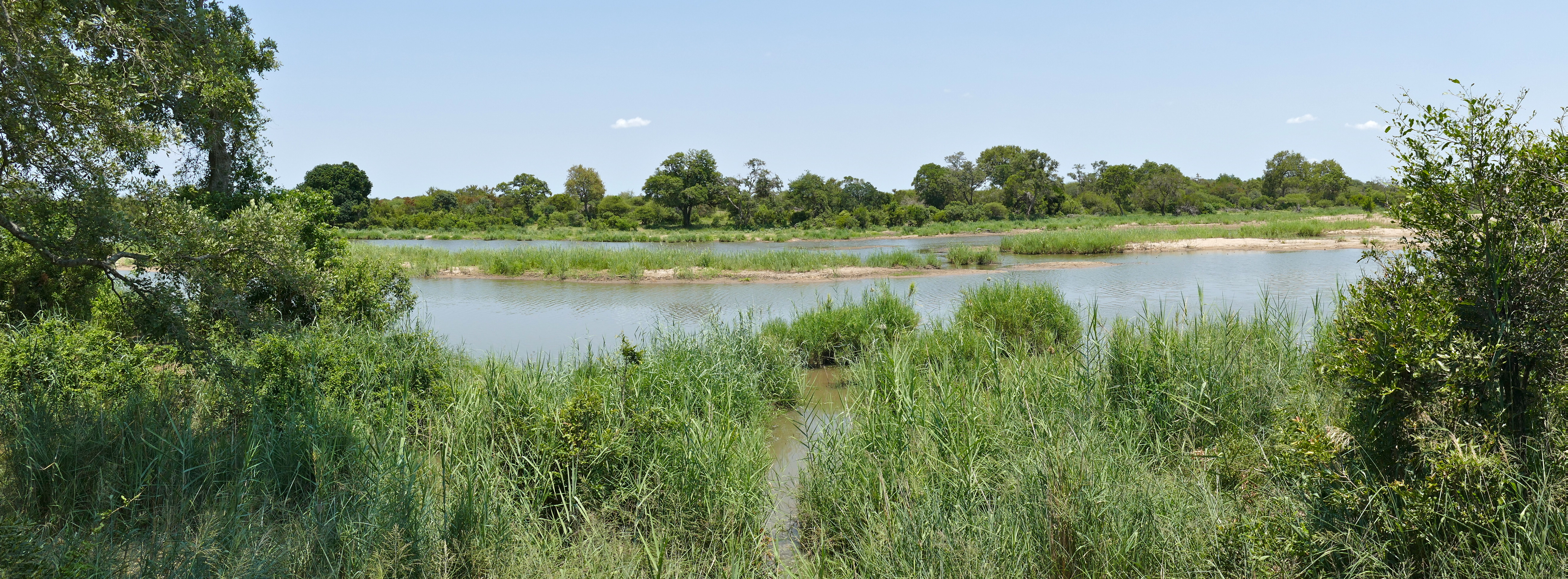

- Location within South Africa

Location
- Country: South Africa
- Region: Mpumalanga

Physical characteristics
- Source
  - location: Acornhoek, Mpumalanga
  - coordinates: 24°35′45″S 31°7′29″E
- Mouth
  - location: Confluence with Olifants River, Mpumalanga
  - coordinates: 24°3′18″S 31°40′39″E

The Timbavati River is a river in Mpumalanga Province of South Africa. It flows mostly through the Kruger National Park after entering the Park adjacent to Maroela Caravan Camp 24°27′20″S 31°23′53″E near Orpen Rest Camp. It is a tributary of the Olifants River and the confluence is at 24°3′18″S 31°40′49″E.

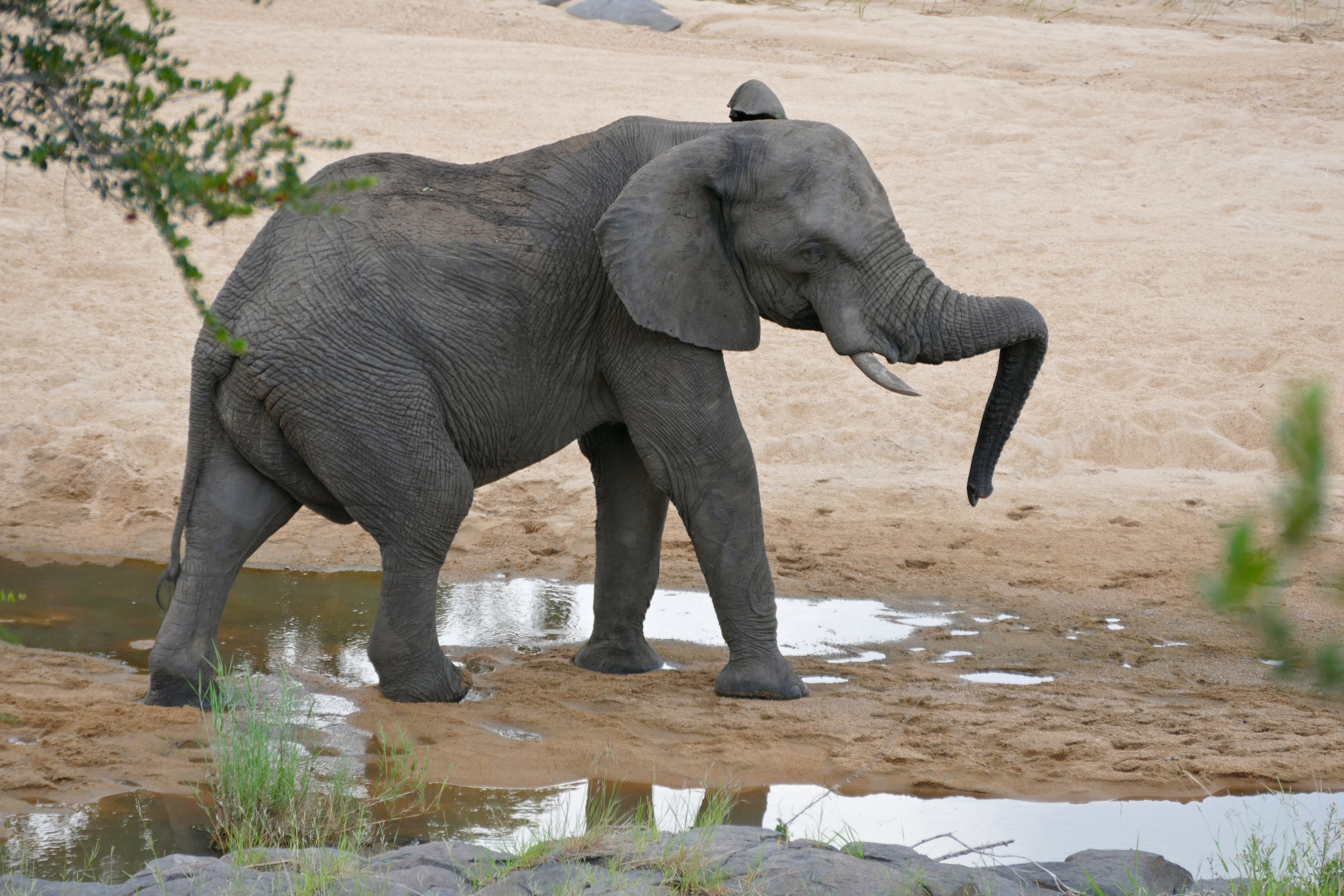
Elephant in the riverbed

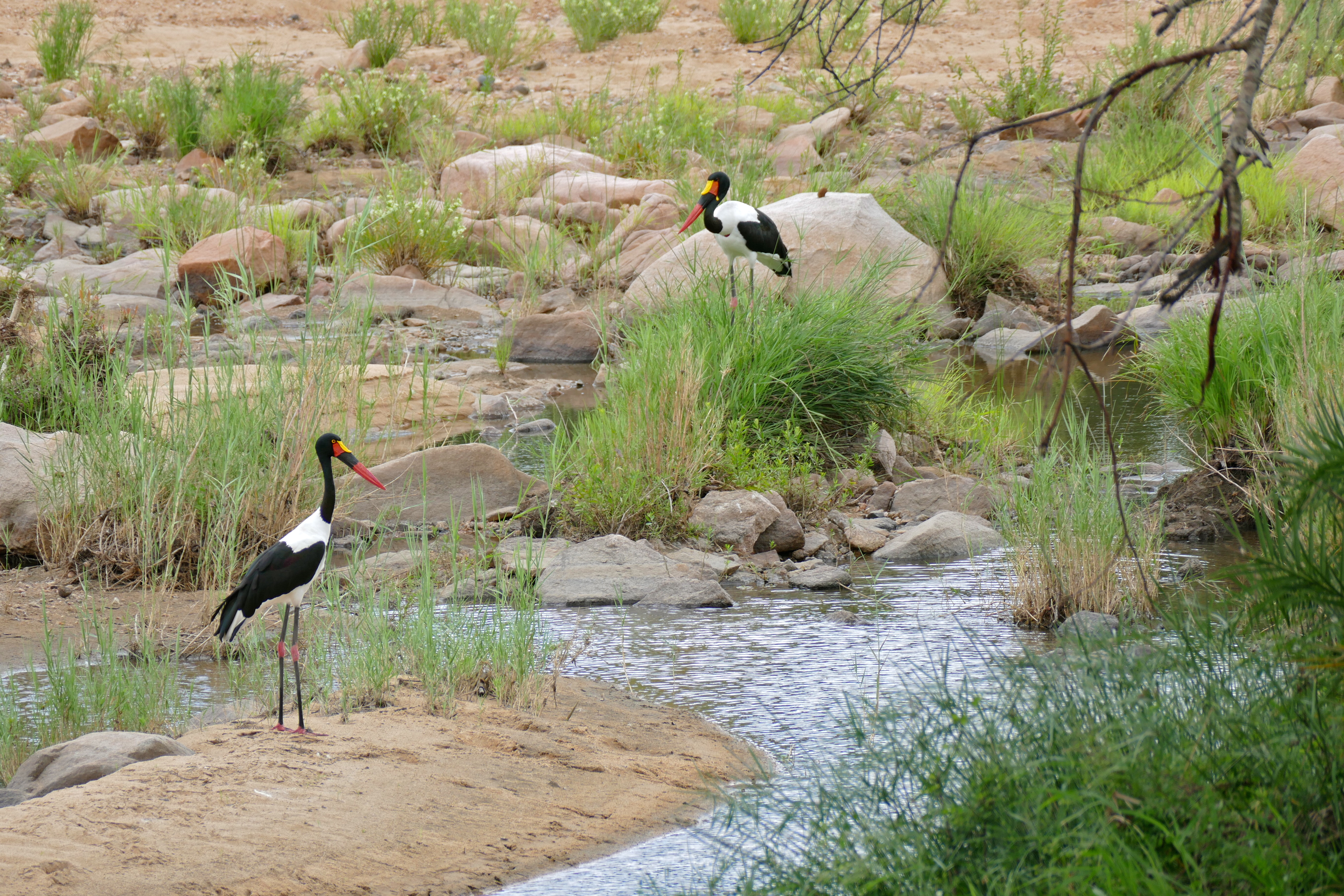
Pair of Saddle-billed storks beside the river

== See also ==
- List of rivers in South Africa
- Timbavati Game Reserve
