= Loskop Dam Nature Reserve =

Nature reserve in South Africa

Coordinates: 25°24′11″S 29°16′47″E

Loskop Dam Nature Reserve is situated in Nkangala DM, Mpumalanga

Loskop Dam Nature Reserve is situated in northern Mpumalanga province, South Africa. The reserve covers approximately 22,850 ha, if the approximately 2,350 ha surface area of the reservoir is included. The Reserve is situated in the Olifants River valley, about 55 km north of Middelburg, and comprises a hilly bushveld region, centered on the Loskop reservoir.

The climate is tropical on the surface. The average temperature is 20 °C. The hottest month is October, at 24 °C, and the coldest is July, at 14 °C. The average rainfall is 805 millimeters per year. The wettest month is December, with 145 millimeters of rain, and the driest is July, with 1 millimeter.
