= Ohrigstad River =

River in Mpumalanga, South Africa joining Blyde River

- Location of the Ohrigstad River's mouth

Location
- Country: South Africa
- State: Mpumalanga

Physical characteristics
- Mouth: Olifants River
  - location: Mpumalanga
  - coordinates: 25°01′41″S 30°39′22″E

Ohrigstad River is located in Mpumalanga, South Africa. The Ohrigstad River joins the Blyde River at the Blyderivierpoort Dam in the Blyde River Canyon Nature Reserve. Like the Blyde, it has its ultimate origin at around 2,000 m altitude to the south, on the verge of the Hartebeesvlakte conservation area, but follows a more westerly course.

== Dams in the River ==
- Ohrigstad Dam

== See also ==
- List of rivers of South Africa
- List of reservoirs and dams in South Africa
- Blyde River Canyon
