= Wilge River (Olifants) =

Wilge River iKuthu
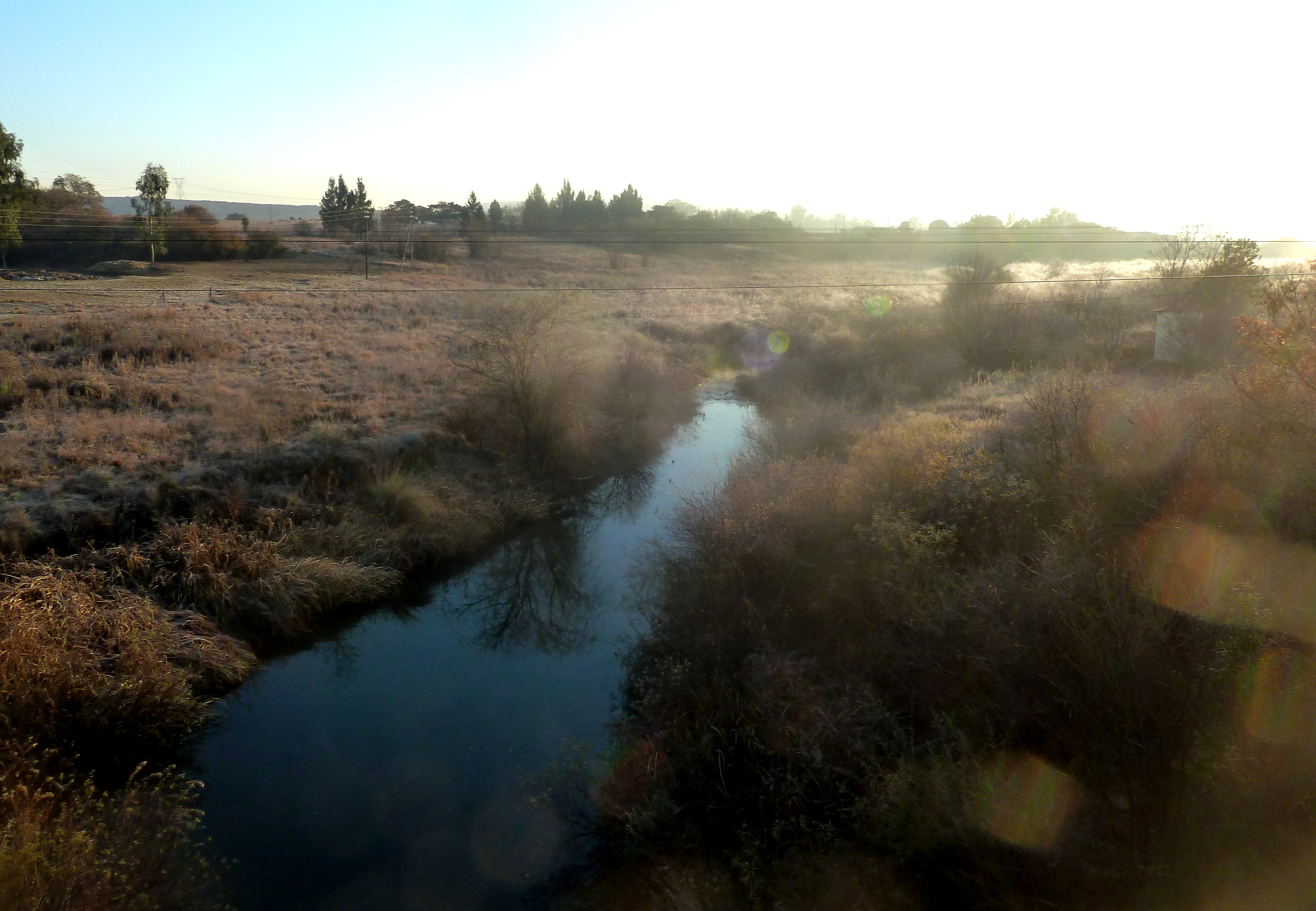
- Upper reaches near Bronkhorstspruit

- Location of the Wilge River mouth
- Etymology: From wilg, the word for 'willow' in Afrikaans iKuthu in Southern Ndebele
- Native name: iKuthu (Southern Ndebele)

Location
- Country: South Africa
- Province: Gauteng and Mpumalanga

Physical characteristics
- Source: Witwatersrand
  - location: Near Leandra
  - elevation: 1,640 m (5,380 ft)
- Mouth: Olifants River (Limpopo)
  - location: SW of Loskop Dam
  - coordinates: 25°34′35″S 29°11′10″E
  - elevation: 1,127 m (3,698 ft)

The Wilge River (iKuthu) is a river in Mpumalanga and Gauteng provinces, South Africa. It is a tributary of the Olifants River.

== Course ==
The Wilge River has its origin about 15 km WNW of Leandra, in the highveld grasslands between this town and Springs, Gauteng. It flows roughly northwards until it is joined by its main tributary, the Bronkhorstspruit, that joins its left bank about 25 km downstream of Bronkhorstspruit town. Then it flows in a northeastern direction until it joins the Olifants about 12 km upstream from the head of the Loskop Dam reservoir.

Other tributaries of the Wilge are the Kendal and the Devon River.

== See also ==
- List of rivers of South Africa
- List of reservoirs and dams in South Africa
