= Bon Accord Dam =

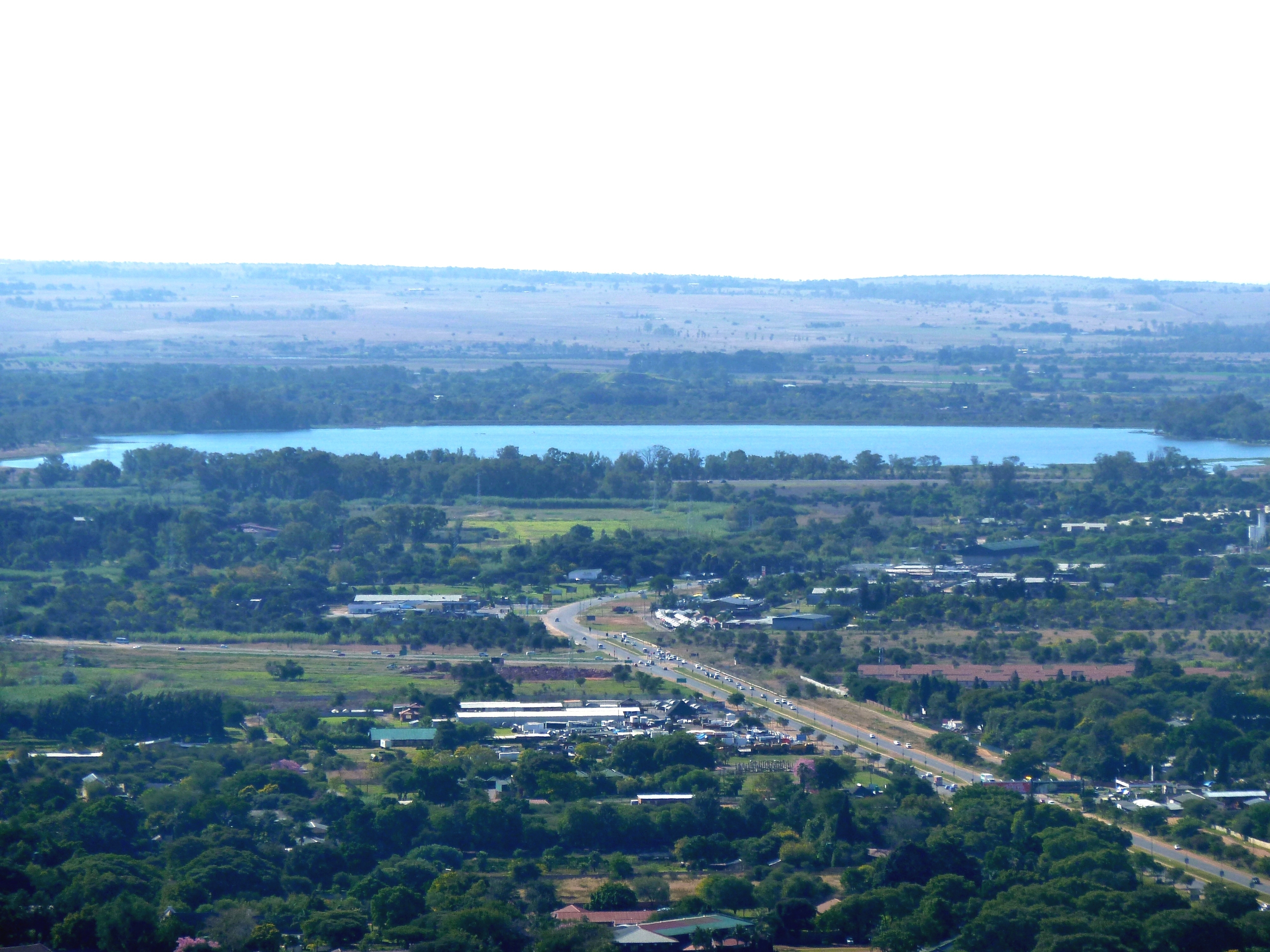
- Interactive map of Bon Accord Dam
- Official name: Bon Accord Dam
- Country: South Africa
- Location: Pretoria, Gauteng
- Coordinates: 25°37′45″S 28°11′22″E
- Purpose: Irrigation, drinking water
- Opening date: 1923
- Owner: Tshwane Metro

Dam and spillways
- Type of dam: Earth fill dam
- Impounds: Apies River
- Height: 17 m
- Length: 1167 m

Reservoir
- Creates: Bon Accord Dam Reservoir
- Total capacity: 4 290 000 m³
- Surface area: 144 ha

Bon Accord Dam is an earth-fill type dam located on the Apies River, some 15 km north of Pretoria. The dam comprises an earth embankment with a side spillway. The catchment area of the dam is 315 km^{2} and comprises primarily the City of Tshwane Metropolitan Municipal area in Gauteng, South Africa. It was established in 1923 and its main purpose is irrigation.

== See also ==
- List of reservoirs and dams in South Africa
- List of rivers of South Africa
