= Klein Letaba River =

Klein Letaba River Little Letaba River
- Location of the Klein Letaba River's mouth

Location
- Country: South Africa
- Region: Limpopo Province

Physical characteristics
- Source
  - location: Soutpansberg
- Mouth: Olifants River
  - location: Limpopo Province
  - coordinates: 23°38′55″S 31°8′42″E

Basin features
- Tributaries
  - right: Middle Letaba River, Koedoes River, Soeketse River

Klein Letaba River is a tributary of the Letaba River, situated in Limpopo, South Africa. After its confluence with the Groot Letaba River on the western boundary of the Kruger National Park, it forms the Letaba River flowing through the whole width of the park.

The Klein Letaba tributaries like the Soeketse River and Koedoes River are wide, dry and sandy ditches for most of the year.
