= Spekboom River =

River in South Africa

- Location of the Spekboom River's mouth

Location
- Country: South Africa
- State: Mpumalanga Province

Physical characteristics
- Mouth: Steelpoort River
  - location: Mpumalanga
  - coordinates: 24.6438°S 30.3050°E

The Spekboom River is a river in Mpumalanga Province, South Africa. It flows northeastwards and is a tributary of the Steelpoort River.

The river hosts recreational flyfishing events.

In 2021, sediment analysis indicated heavy metal contamination from human activities.

== See also ==
- List of rivers of South Africa
