= Tamboti River =

- Location within South Africa

Location
- Country: South Africa
- Region: Limpopo

Physical characteristics
- Mouth: Limpopo River
  - coordinates: 23.230725°S 27.720097°E

The Tamboti River is a river in the Limpopo Province of South Africa. It is a right hand tributary of the long Limpopo River.

== See also ==
- List of rivers in South Africa
