= Flag Boshielo =

South African activist (born 1920; disappeared 20 August 1970)

Flag Boshielo OLG
- Born: Flag Marutle Boshielo; 1920; Phokoane, Sekhukhuneland; Transvaal, Union of South Africa
- Disappeared: 20 August 1970; Caprivi Strip, South West Africa
- Status: Missing for 56 years, 1 month and 20 days (Presumed dead)
- Political party: African National Congress
- Other political affiliations: South African Communist Party

Flag Marutle Boshielo (born 1920; disappeared 20 August 1970) was a South African anti-apartheid activist, trade unionist, and communist. He went into exile with the African National Congress (ANC) after the party was banned in 1960 and served as political commissar of Umkhonto we Sizwe (MK) from 1969 until his disappearance in 1970. He went missing in August 1970 during an unsuccessful MK operation after his contingent was ambushed. He is presumed to have died in 1970 or soon afterwards.

== Early life and activism ==
Boshielo was born in 1920 in Phokoane in Sekhukhuneland in the former Northern Transvaal. In his 20s, he moved to Johannesburg, where he found work as a gardener and later as a driver for a bakery. He became active in the trade union movement and joined the Communist Party of South Africa (CPSA) and African National Congress (ANC). During the ANC's 1952 Defiance Campaign, he led the first corps of Johannesburg volunteers in their civil disobedience, and he worked for the CPSA's newspaper, the Guardian. He was also a founding member of Sebatakgomo, a resistance movement formed by Sekhukhune migrant workers in Johannesburg that went on to play a central role in the 1958 Sekhukhuneland revolt.

Boshielo was renowned as a prolific recruiter to the CPSA and ANC. Among those he recruited was his close friend John Nkadimeng. Around 1957, Nkadimeng and Boshielo met with Nelson Mandela on a fortnightly basis to discuss politics. Nkadimeng later recalled that Boshielo and Mandela often had vociferous arguments: while Mandela wanted white activists excluded from leadership positions in the anti-apartheid struggle, Boshielo supported a non-racialist position inspired by materialist analysis.

== Exile and disappearance ==
In the early 1960s, Boshielo went into exile with the ANC, which was banned by the apartheid government in 1960. He received political and military training in Moscow as a recruit to Umkhonto we Sizwe (MK), the new joint armed wing of the ANC and CPSA, and then joined MK at its Kongwa camp in Tanzania. At the ANC's 1969 Morogoro Conference, Boshielo was the foremost defender of a new proposal to open ANC membership to people of all race groups. The proposal was adopted and, in addition, Boshielo was appointed as MK's overall political commissar.

Boshielo disappeared on 20 August 1970 during an MK operation which aimed to infiltrate a small group of cadres across Rhodesia into Sekhukhuneland. The group was ambushed while crossing the Zambezi River near the Caprivi Strip, and two other cadres died in a shoot-out. Speaking at the University of Lagos in 1971, ANC president Oliver Tambo, calling for a pan-African campaign to find and rescue Boshielo, said that he was presumed wounded and captured.

Boshielo is presumed to have died at Caprivi or in subsequent detention in Rhodesia. In April 2005, post-apartheid president Thabo Mbeki awarded him the Order of Luthuli in Gold "for his exceptional contribution to the struggle for liberation and workers' rights". He is also the namesake of the Flag Boshielo Dam in Limpopo (present-day Northern Transvaal).

== See also ==
- List of people who disappeared mysteriously: 1910–1990
