= Steelpoort River =

River in South Africa

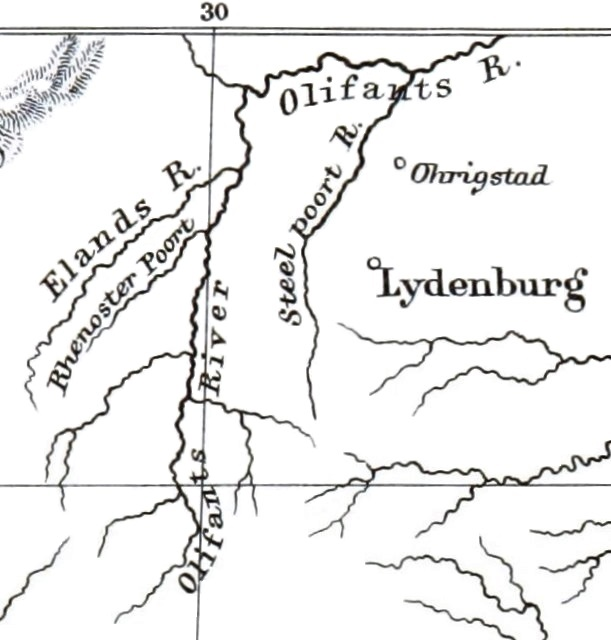
- Steelpoort River shown as a tributary of the Olifants on a map of 1887

- Location of the Steelpoort River's mouth
- Native name: Tubatse (Northern Sotho); iNdubazi (Southern Ndebele)

Location
- Country: South Africa
- State: Limpopo Province

Physical characteristics
- Source
  - location: Kwaggaskop, Mpumalanga
  - elevation: 1,930 m (6,330 ft)
- Mouth: Olifants River
  - location: Near Kromellenboog, Limpopo Province
  - coordinates: 24°26′35″S 30°26′06″E
  - elevation: 605 m (1,985 ft)
- Basin size: 7,139 km^{2} (2,756 sq mi)

The Steelpoort River, iNdubazi or Tubatse (Afrikaans: Steelpoortrivier) is a river in Limpopo Province, South Africa. It flows northeastwards and is a right hand tributary of the Olifants River, joining it at the lower end of its basin. Its source is located at Kwaggaskop, a farm between Dullstroom, Stoffberg and Belfast.

The main tributaries of the Steelpoort River are the Klip River, Dwars River, Waterval River and the Spekboom River. The De Hoop Dam on the Steelpoort River has been in operation from late 2014.

Some stretches of this river are popular spots for kayaking.

Sekhukhuneland, the historical area of the Pedi people, is located between the Steelpoort River and the Olifants River.

== See also ==
- List of rivers of South Africa
