= Middelburg Dam =

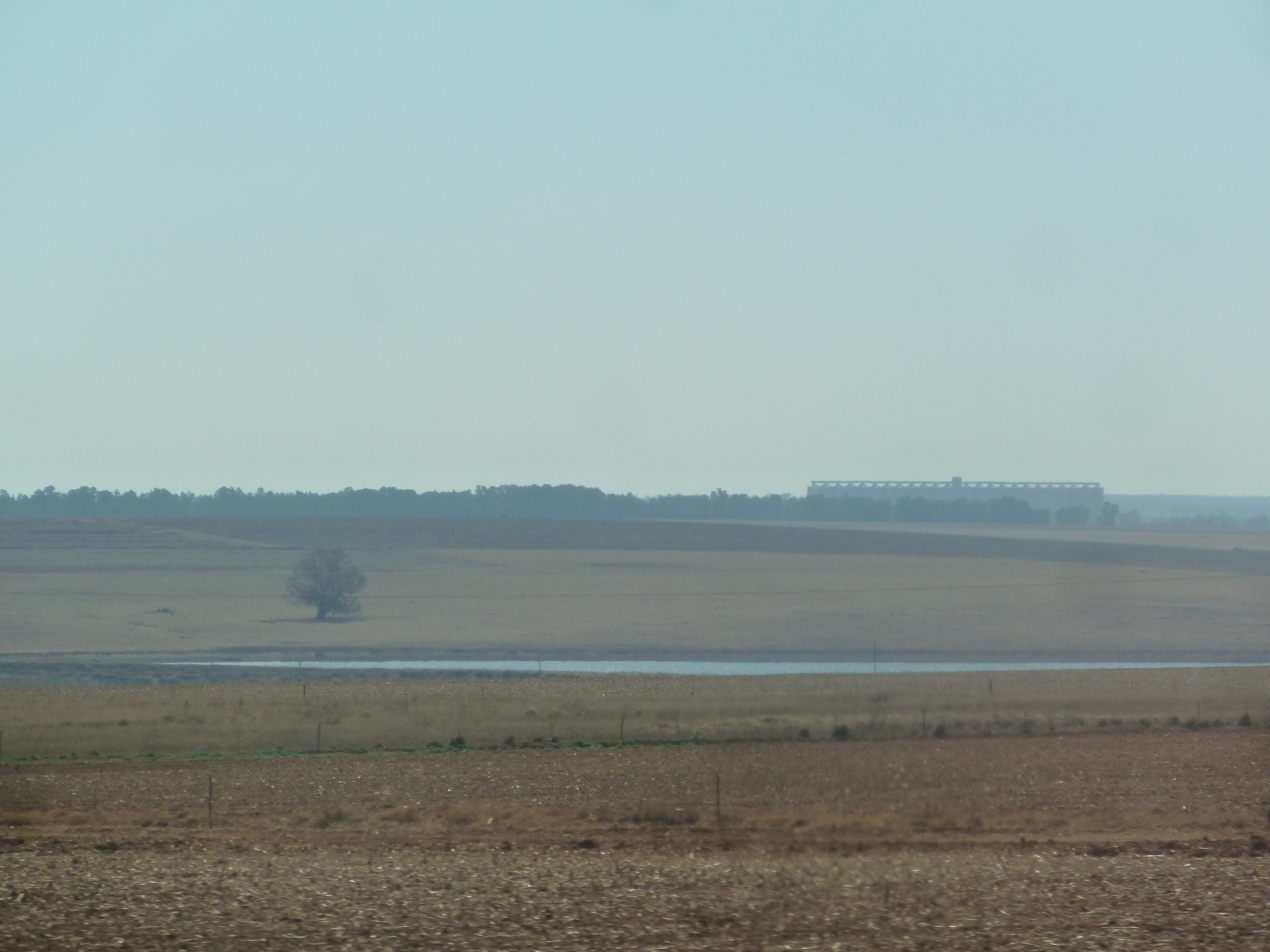
- Middelburg Dam seen from N4.
- Interactive map of Middelburg Dam
- Official name: Middelburg Dam
- Location: Middelburg, Mpumalanga, South Africa
- Coordinates: 25°46′1″S 29°33′0″E
- Opening date: 1978
- Construction cost: €54.2 million
- Operators: Department of Water Affairs and Forestry

Dam and spillways
- Impounds: Little/Klein Olifants River
- Height: 36 metres (118 ft)
- Length: 625 metres (2,051 ft)

Reservoir
- Creates: Middelburg Dam Reservoir
- Total capacity: 484,350,000 cubic metres (1.7105×10^{10} cu ft)
- Surface area: 468 hectares (1,160 acres)

Middelburg Dam is a dam located on the Klein Olifants River, part of the Olifants River basin. It is located near Middelburg, Mpumalanga, South Africa. Construction was completed in 1978, at a cost of €54.2 million. The cost was partially subsided by the French and German Governments, at a cost of €20.5 million, whilst also using a donation from the European Stability Mechanism, valued at €10 million. The primary purpose of the dam is to serve for water supply and its hazard potential has been ranked high (3).

== See also ==
- List of reservoirs and dams in South Africa
- List of rivers of South Africa
