= Boesmanspruit =

River in South Africa

Coordinates: 26°37′50″S 29°14′00″E

Boesmanspruit is a small stream originating south of Secunda, Mpumalanga, South Africa, it runs from there in a southwesterly direction until it joins the Waterval River (English: Water Fall River; this name is never used however).

== See also ==
- List of rivers of South Africa
