= Ga-Selati River =

River in Limpopo, South Africa

Ga-Selati River Selatirivier
- Location of the Ga-Selati River's mouth
- Etymology: Said to be named after a chief

Location
- Country: South Africa
- State: Limpopo

Physical characteristics
- Source: Wolkberg
  - location: SE of Tzaneen
  - elevation: 840 m (2,760 ft)
- Mouth: Olifants River (Limpopo)
  - location: Near Phalaborwa
  - coordinates: 24°2′20″S 31°10′20″E
  - elevation: 297 m (974 ft)
- Length: 140 km (87 mi)
- Discharge
  - minimum: 0.29 m^{3}/s (10 cu ft/s)
  - maximum: 4.9 m^{3}/s (170 cu ft/s)

The Ga-Selati River or Selati River (Afrikaans: Selatirivier) is a river in Limpopo, South Africa.

== Course ==
It rises on the rugged western slopes of the Wolkberg Mountains, part of the Drakensberg Mountain chain, about 20 km SE of Tzaneen. From its source in this high rainfall zone, the river flows roughly eastward for approximately 140 kilometres before joining the Olifants River some 7 kilometres to the south of the town of Phalaborwa.

The Ga-Selati River's largest tributaries are the Ngwabitsi River and the Mulati River, both joining its right bank.

In the dry season, the riverbed of the Ga-Selati is dry for most of its length. This river is heavily polluted owing to mining activity at Phalaborwa in its lower course.

== Dams in the basin ==
- Tours Dam, in the Ngwabitsi River

== See also ==
- List of rivers of South Africa
- List of reservoirs and dams in South Africa
