= Knellpoort Dam =

- Interactive map of Knellpoort Dam
- Official name: Knellpoort Dam
- Location: Free State, South Africa
- Coordinates: 29°47′1″S 26°53′0″E
- Opening date: 1989
- Operators: Department of Water Affairs and Forestry

Dam and spillways
- Type of dam: gravity & arch
- Impounds: Riet Spruit
- Height: 50 m
- Length: 200 m

Reservoir
- Creates: Knellpoort Dam Reservoir
- Total capacity: 136 151 000 m^{3}
- Catchment area: 764 km^{2}
- Surface area: 985.4 ha

Knellpoort Dam is a combined gravity & arch type dam located on the Riet Spruit, near Wepener, Free State, South Africa. It was established in 1989. Due to siltation, the storage capacity of the Welbedacht Dam reduced rapidly from the original 115 million m^{3} to approximately 16 million m^{3} during the twenty years since completion. This reduction in storage created problems in meeting the Bloemfontein water demand at an acceptable level of reliability and as a result, the 50 m high Knellpoort Dam was completed in 1989. It was the first arch gravity roller compacted concrete (RCC) dam in the world and comprises almost 64 600 m^{3} rollcrete and 14 200 m^{3} concrete with a gross storage capacity of 136 million m^{3}.

In order to prevent similar siltation problems to those experienced at the Welbedacht Dam, the Knellpoort Dam functions as an off-channel storage dam with a relatively small catchment area of only 764 km^{2} and corresponding Mean Annual Runoff (MAR) of approximately 20 million m^{3}/a . Water from the Caledon River is pumped to Knellpoort Dam from the Tienfontein Pumping Station via a 2 km long canal which is equipped with a silt trap to reduce siltation in the main reservoir.

The dams primary purpose is to serve for municipal and industrial use and its hazard potential has been ranked high (3).

== See also ==
- Welbedacht Dam
- List of reservoirs and dams in South Africa
- List of rivers of South Africa
