= Spruyt =

Spruyt is a Belgian and Dutch surname meaning "sprout". At its origin it may have referred to its meaning as a young person / scion. The spelling in the Netherlands is usually Spruijt or Spruit, while Spruyt is the most common form in Belgium. People with the name include:

- Bart Jan Spruyt (born 1964), Dutch historian, journalist, and writer
- Ferre Spruyt (born 1986), Belgian speed skater
- Hendrik Spruyt, Dutch-American political scientist.
- Jan Willem Spruyt (1826–1908), South African civil servant, lawyer and statesman
- Jozef Spruyt (born 1943), Belgian road bicycle racer

== See also ==
- Spruit
