= Bronkhorstspruit Dam =

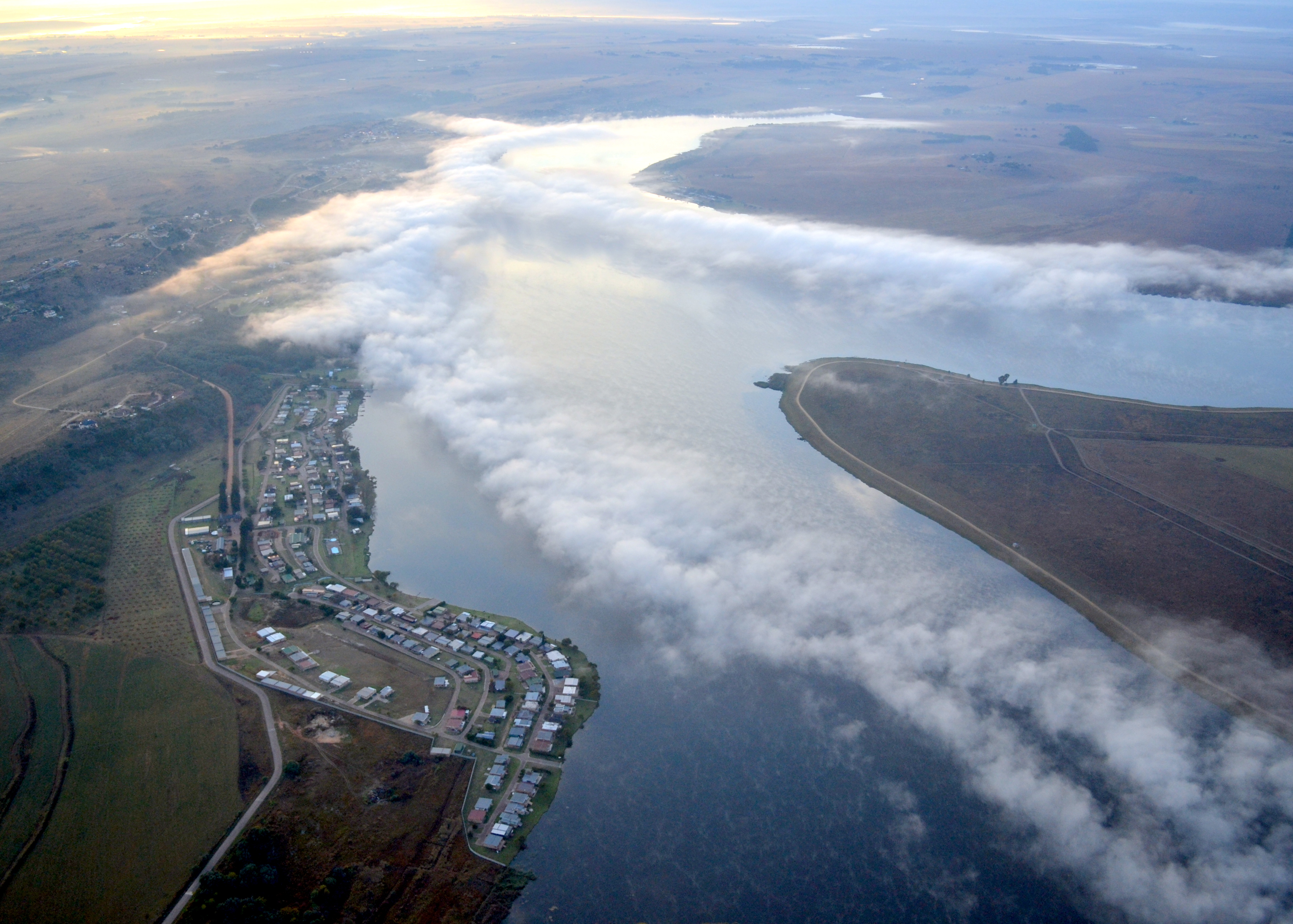
- Interactive map of Bronkhorstspruit Dam
- Official name: Bronkhorstspruit Dam
- Country: South Africa
- Location: Gauteng
- Coordinates: 25°53′15″S 28°43′15″E
- Purpose: Industrial and domestic
- Opening date: 1950
- Owner: Department of Water Affairs

Dam and spillways
- Type of dam: Arch dam
- Impounds: Bronkhorst Spruit
- Height: 35.2 m
- Length: 152.4 m

Reservoir
- Creates: Bronkhorstspruit Dam Reservoir
- Total capacity: 57 913 000 m³
- Surface area: 860.9 ha

Bronkhorstspruit Dam is a concrete-arch type dam on the Bronkhorst Spruit, near Bronkhorstspruit, Gauteng, South Africa. It was established in 1950 and its main purpose is for domestic supply and industrial use.

The lake's shores are home to numerous recreational resorts and exclusive housing projects. It is a mecca for boating and water sports such as sailing, jetskiing, waterskiing and parasailing.

== See also ==
- List of reservoirs and dams in South Africa
- List of rivers of South Africa
