= Klaserie River =

- Location of the Klaserie River's mouth

Location
- Country: South Africa
- State: Limpopo Province
- District: Mopani District

Physical characteristics
- Source: East of Blyde River Canyon
  - coordinates: 24.5572°S 30.9109°E
- Mouth: Olifants River, Limpopo
  - location: Kruger National Park
  - coordinates: 24.0821°S 31.2489°E

The Klaserie River is a river in Limpopo Province, South Africa. It flows northeastwards and is a tributary of the Olifants River, joining it at 90° in the west of the Kruger National Park. Rising on the eastern slopes of the Drakensberg escarpment near Mariepskop, it flows eastwards through the Klaserie Private Nature Reserve before joining the Olifants River within Kruger National Park. The river forms part of the larger Limpopo River catchment and is an important ecological component of the Greater Kruger landscape.

The river supports diverse riparian habitats and serves as a vital water source for wildlife, tourism operations, and surrounding communities. Sections of the river flow through privately managed conservation areas that collectively form part of the unfenced Greater Kruger ecosystem.

== Course ==
The Klaserie River originates in the mountainous headwaters of the Drakensberg escarpment near Mariepskop and descends eastwards through the Lowveld region of Limpopo. In its upper reaches, the river is characterised by a confined single channel with substrates composed primarily of bedrock, boulders, cobbles, gravel and sand. Downstream of the Fleur-de-Lys gauging station, the river forms multiple interconnected channels across its floodplain. Major flood events have periodically reshaped the channel morphology and riparian vegetation.

The river eventually enters the Greater Kruger conservation area and joins the Olifants River within Kruger National Park.

== Ecology ==
The Klaserie River supports a variety of ecosystems, including riparian woodland, floodplains and seasonal wetlands. As a headwater stream, it contributes significantly to regional freshwater biodiversity and ecological processes within the Olifants River basin. The river and its associated habitats support populations of large mammals including African bush elephants, African buffalo, lions, leopards and rhinoceroses. The Klaserie landscape forms part of an extensive network of protected areas that allows free movement of wildlife between private reserves and Kruger National Park.

The river corridor has also been identified as an important habitat for the conservation of white lions, which occur naturally in the Greater Timbavati–Klaserie region.

== Dam ==
- Jan Wassenaar Dam - built in 1961 as a earthen dam with a concrete spillway to store irrigation water, it was raised by a further three metres in 1968. It is 98 metres long and 17.5 metres tall.

== See also ==
- List of rivers of South Africa
