= Olifants River (Limpopo) =

River in South Africa and Mozambique

Olifants River Olifantsrivier, Rio dos Elefantes
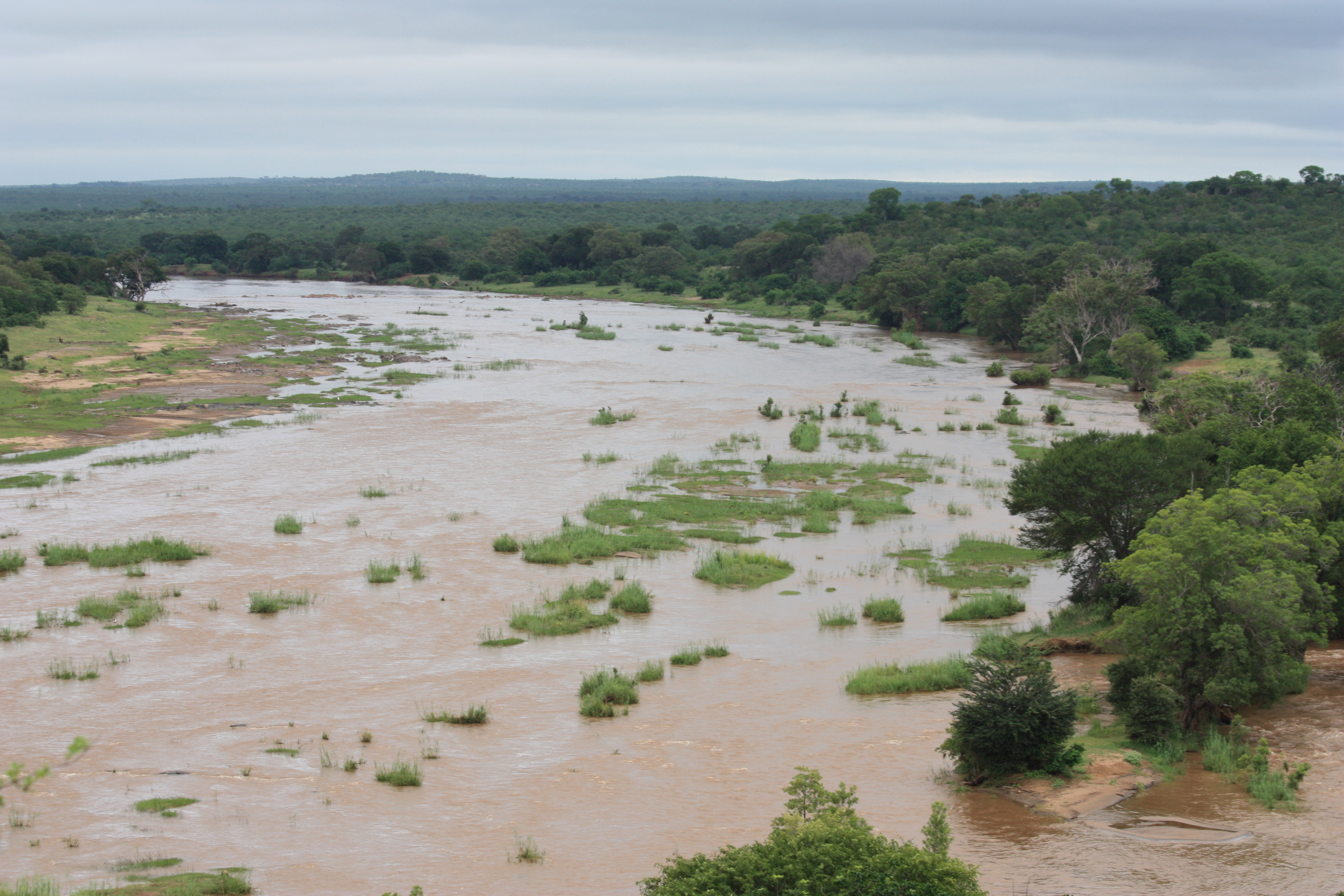
- Olifants River as it flows through the Kruger National Park

- Location of the Olifants-Limpopo confluence
- Etymology: Olifant means "elephant" in Afrikaans, Obalule, means "long, stretched-out one" and Lepelle means "slow-flowing" or "distant"
- Native name: Lepelle (Northern Sotho); Obalule (Zulu); iBhalule (Southern Ndebele)

Location
- Country: South Africa and Mozambique
- Provinces: Mpumalanga, Limpopo and Gaza

Physical characteristics
- Source: Near Bethal
  - location: Mpumalanga, South Africa
  - coordinates: 26°20′33″S 29°49′47″E
  - elevation: 1,800 m (5,900 ft)
- Mouth: Limpopo River
  - location: Gaza Province, Mozambique
  - coordinates: 24°6′44″S 32°38′25″E
- Basin size: 54,570 km^{2} (21,070 sq mi)

Basin features
- Tributaries
  - left: Letaba River
  - right: Steelpoort River

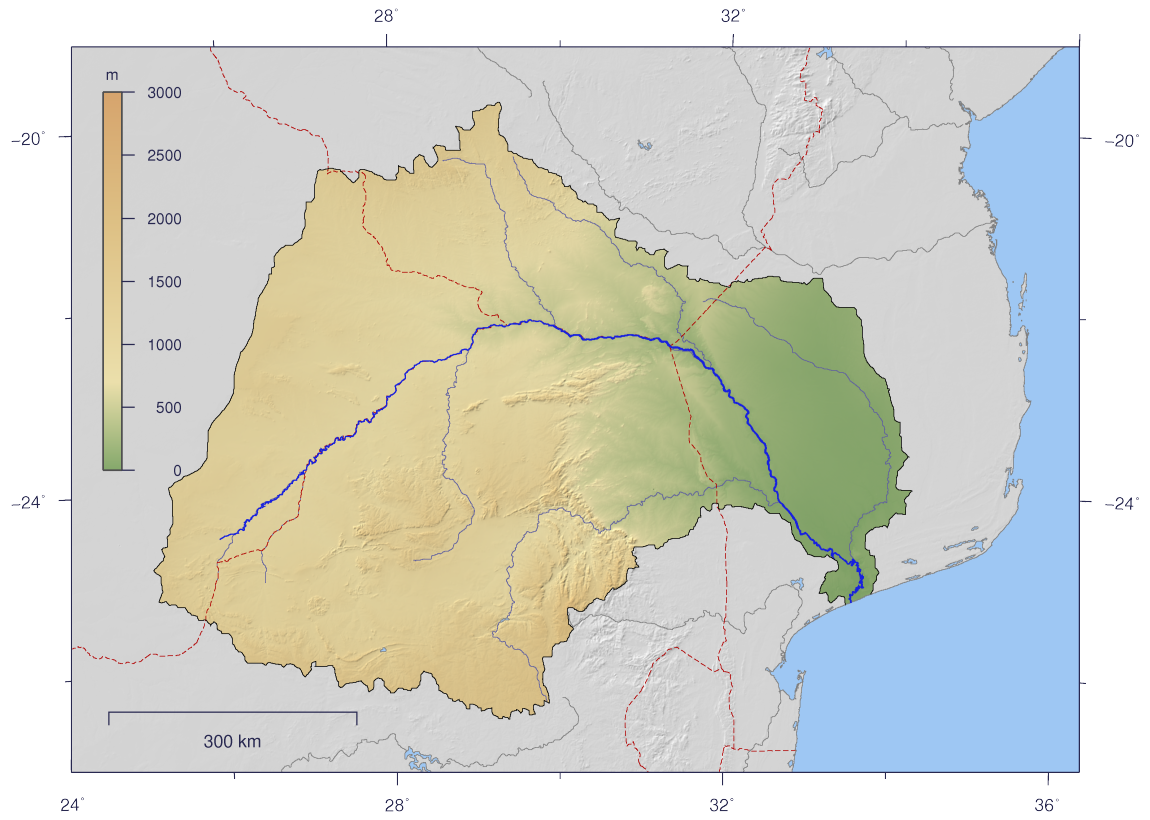
Course and catchment of the Limpopo River. The Olifants joins the Limpopo from the right, some 190 kilometres from the Indian Ocean.

The Olifants River, Lepelle, iBhalule or Obalule (Afrikaans: Olifantsrivier; Portuguese: Rio dos Elefantes) is a river in South Africa and Mozambique, a tributary of the Limpopo River. It falls into the Drainage Area B of the Drainage basins of South Africa. The historical area of the Pedi people, Sekhukhuneland, is located between the Olifants River and one of its largest tributaries, the Steelpoort River.

== Course ==
The Olifants River has its origin between Breyten and Bethal, Mpumalanga Province. It flows north towards Limpopo Province through Witbank Dam and then the Loskop Dam and is forced east by the Transvaal Drakensberg, cutting through at the Abel Erasmus Pass and then flowing east further across the Lowveld to join with the Letaba River. It crosses into Gaza Province, Mozambique, after cutting through the Lebombo Mountains by way of the Olifants Gorge, becoming the Rio dos Elefantes, and finally joining the Limpopo River after 40 km before it enters the Indian Ocean at Xai-Xai north of Maputo.

== Water quality ==
Overgrazing in sections of its middle course result in the river carrying away eroded soil after heavy rains. The Olifants river has become one of the most heavily polluted rivers in South Africa, not by human or industrial waste, but by thriving green algae. A 2013 study in the Kruger Park found that the river was mesotrophic, meaning that nutrient levels were fairly low, though a slight increase in nitrates could initiate eutrophication. Very high sulphate levels were attributed to coal mining and industry in the upper catchment.

== Tributaries ==
The Olifants River's largest tributaries are the Letaba River and the Steelpoort River known as Tubatse River. Other tributaries are the Tongwane, Blyde, Moses, Spekboom, Timbavati, Nkumpi, Ga-Selati, Klaserie, Makhutswi, Mohlapitse River, Lepellane River, Mohwetse River and Ngwaritsi River. Some tributaries, notably the Klein Olifants River (origin near Hendrina, joins the Olifants River downstream of the Middelburg Dam), the Elands, Wilge and the Bronkhorstspruit, rise in the Highveld grasslands. The Shingwedzi River flows close to the northeastern side of the Massingir Dam reservoir and joins the left bank of the Olifants about 12 km downstream from the dam wall.

== Dams ==
Thirty large dams in the Olifants River Catchment include the following:

=== South Africa ===
- Witbank Dam
- Rhenosterkop Dam, on the Elands River
- Rust de Winter Dam
- Blyderivierpoort Dam
- Loskop Dam
- Middelburg Dam, on the Klein Olifants River
- Ohrigstad Dam
- De Hoop Dam
- Flag Boshielo Dam
- Phalaborwa Barrage

=== Mozambique ===
- Massingir Dam

== See also ==
- List of rivers in South Africa
- Water Management Areas
