= Bamboes Spruit (North West) =

- Location within South Africa

Location
- Country: South Africa
- Province: North West

Physical characteristics
- Source
  - location: North West Province, South Africa
  - coordinates: 27°33′9″S 25°51′10″E
  - elevation: 1,230 m (4,040 ft)
- Mouth: Vaal River
  - location: Bloemhof Dam

Bamboes Spruit, also known as Bamboesspruit, is a river in the North West province of South Africa. It is a tributary of the large Vaal River, emptying into the Bloemhof Dam.

== See also ==
- List of reservoirs and dams in South Africa
- List of rivers of South Africa
