= Groot Letaba River =

Coordinates: 23°39′S 31°09′E

The Groot Letaba River headwater streams originate in the Drakensberg Escarpment, descending in long runs with an occasional riffle or pool, mostly in the Limpopo province of South Africa.

== Tributaries ==
At the higher level, the Broederstroom River, Politsi River, Debengeni River, Letsitele River, and Thabina River, join the Groot Letaba. Lower down, the Molototsi River (a seasonal stream) and Nsama River join before the Nsami Dam. Just before the Kruger National Park the Klein Letaba River flows into the river. From here, the combined rivers are simply known as the Letaba River.

== Dams ==
More than 20 major dams have been constructed in the Groot Letaba River catchment. The Tzaneen Dam on the Groot Letaba River and the Middle Letaba Dam are the two largest dams in the Limpopo Province. Other large dams in the catchment include the Ebenezer Dam, Magoebaskloof Dam, Nsami Dam and Modjadji Dam.

== See also ==
- List of reservoirs and dams in South Africa
