= Welbedacht Dam =

- Interactive map of Welbedacht Dam
- Official name: Welbedacht Dam
- Location: Free State, South Africa
- Coordinates: 29.85985°S 26.89062°E
- Opening date: 1973
- Operator: Department of Water Affairs

Dam and spillways
- Type of dam: Concrete gravity
- Impounds: Caledon River
- Height: 32 m
- Length: 230 m

Reservoir
- Creates: Welbedacht Dam Reservoir
- Total capacity: 10,330,000 m^{3}
- Catchment area: 15,270 km^{2}
- Surface area: 1017.5 ha

Welbedacht Dam is a concrete-gravity type dam situated in South Africa, and was established in 1973. Bloemfontein is the sixth-largest city in South Africa, with a population of around 300 000. It is situated in the Modder River catchment, which has insufficient water resources to meet the growing water requirements. The water supply to Bloemfontein is, therefore, augmented from the adjacent Caledon River by means of the Caledon - Modder River Government Water Scheme (CMRGWS).

Bloemfontein originally planned to receive Orange River water from Vanderkloof Dam, but the outlet works for the transfer scheme still exist at the dam wall. For various reasons, however, constructing a smaller scheme on the Caledon River was implemented before the completion of the Vanderkloof Dam. The Welbedacht Dam on the Caledon River was constructed as the main storage element of the CMRGWS and water is abstracted from this dam for transfer to Bloemfontein and various smaller users along the way.

The Welbedacht Dam is a concrete barrage-type dam on the Caledon River, which was designed and constructed by the Department of Water Affairs. The dam has a catchment area of some 15 245 km^{2} with a natural mean annual runoff (MAR) of around 1210 million m^{3}/a (1920 to 1987) and was completed in 1973. Its purpose was to supply water to the city of Bloemfontein via the 115-km-long Caledon-Bloemfontein pipeline, which has a capacity of around 1.157 m^{3}/s. Due to the high sediment concentration in the water, the transfer from Welbedacht Dam is first purified at the Welbedacht Purification Plant, which is located just downstream of the dam. The purification plant has a capacity of 1.68 m^{3}/s. The hazard potential of the dam has been ranked high.

Due to siltation, the storage capacity of the Welbedacht Dam reduced rapidly from the original 115 million m^{3} to roughly 16 million m^{3} during the 20 years since completion. This reduction in storage created problems in meeting the Bloemfontein demand at an acceptable level of reliability and as a result, the 50-m-high Knellpoort Dam was completed in 1988.

== See also ==
- List of reservoirs and dams in South Africa
