= Witbank Dam =

Dam in Mpumalanga, South Africa

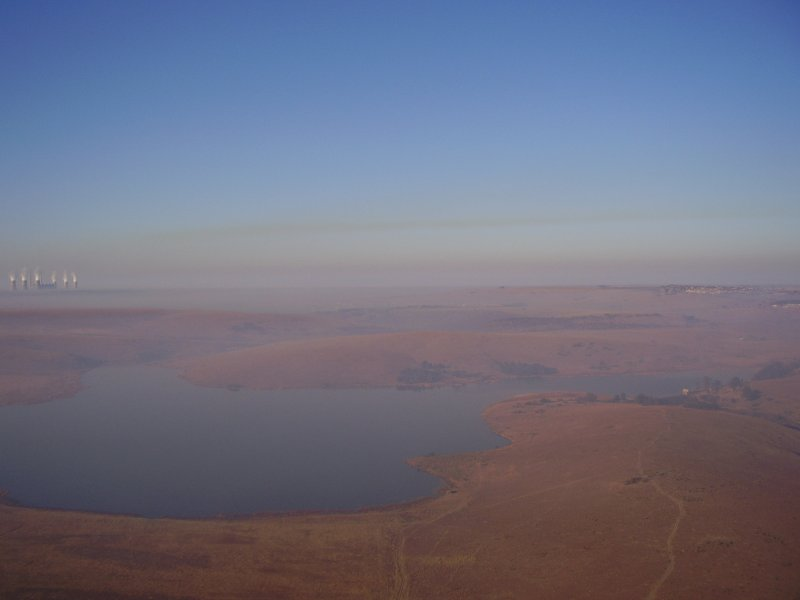
- Witbank Dam and Duvha Power Station
- Interactive map of Witbank Dam
- Official name: Witbank Dam
- Country: South Africa
- Location: Witbank, Mpumalanga
- Coordinates: 25.8909°S 29.3054°E
- Purpose: Industrial and domestic
- Opening date: 1971
- Owner: Witbank Municipality

Dam and spillways
- Type of dam: buttress
- Impounds: Olifants River
- Height: 42 m the total depth is measured at 47 Meters
- Length: 562 m in 2017 the Local Municipality built a palisade fence around the wall

Reservoir
- Creates: Witbank Dam Reservoir
- Total capacity: 104 019 000 m^{3}
- Surface area: 1 211.2 ha
- Website www.nsri.co.za

Witbank Dam is a buttress type dam located on the Olifants River in South Africa. It was established in 1971 and serves mainly for municipal and industrial water supply purposes. The hazard potential of the dam has been ranked high (3).

== See also ==
- List of reservoirs and dams in South Africa
