= Ohrigstad Dam =

- Interactive map of Ohrigstad Dam
- Country: South Africa
- Location: Ohrigstad, Mpumalanga
- Coordinates: 24°55′01″S 30°37′01″E
- Purpose: Irrigation and domestic
- Opening date: 1955
- Owner: Department of Water Affairs

Dam and spillways
- Type of dam: rockfill
- Impounds: Ohrigstad River
- Height: 51.8m
- Length: 377 m

Reservoir
- Creates: Ohrigstad Dam Reservoir
- Total capacity: 14 216 000 m^{3}
- Catchment area: 84 km^{2}
- Surface area: 99.2 ha

Ohrigstad Dam is a rockfill type dam located close to Ohrigstad in Mpumalanga, South Africa. It was established in 1955 and serves primarily for irrigation purposes. The hazard potential of the dam has been ranked high (3).

== See also ==
- List of reservoirs and dams in South Africa
