= Loskop Dam =

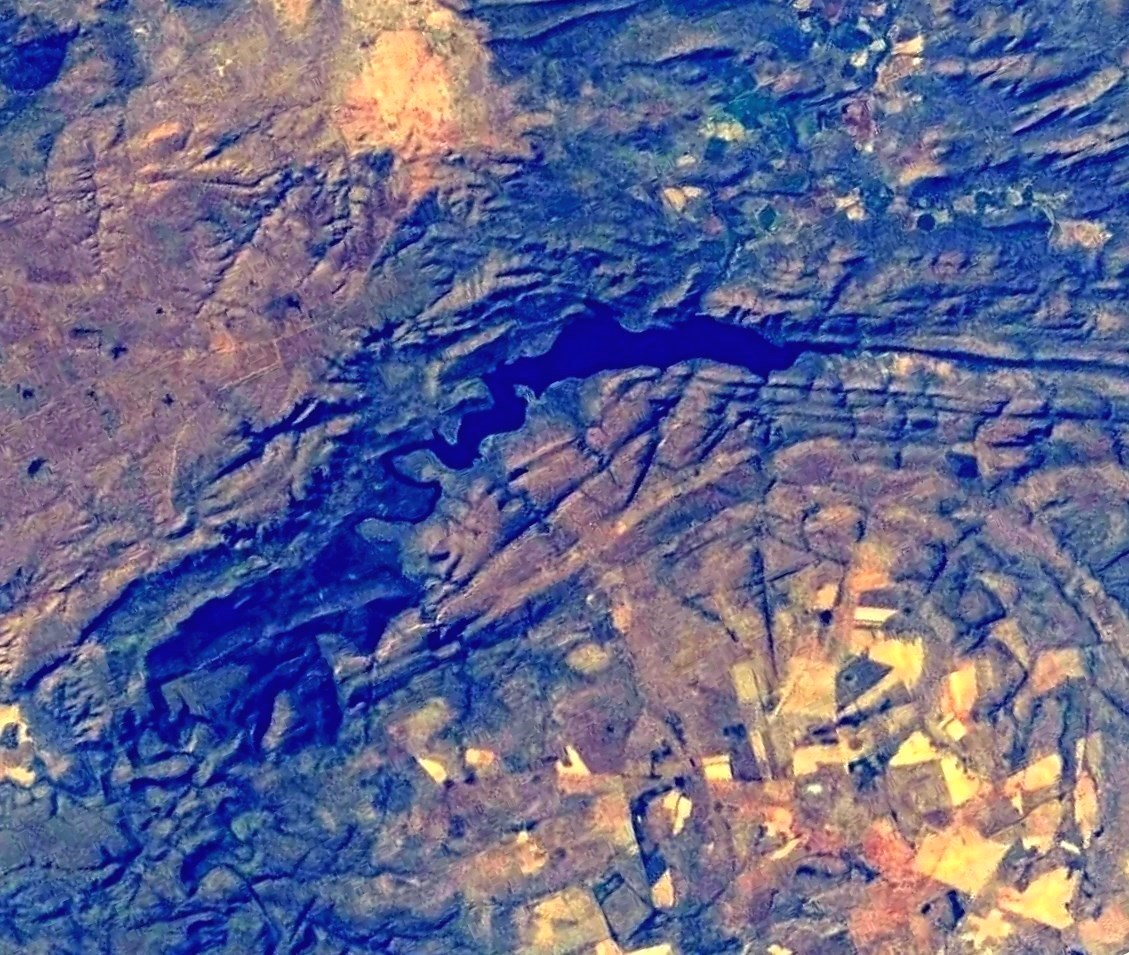
- View from space, 2012
- Interactive map of Loskop Dam
- Official name: Loskop Dam
- Country: South Africa
- Location: Mpumalanga
- Coordinates: 25°25′1″S 29°21′1″E
- Purpose: Irrigation
- Opening date: 1939 (renovated: 1979)
- Owner: Department of Water Affairs

Dam and spillways
- Type of dam: Arch-gravity dam
- Impounds: Olifants River
- Height: 49 metres (161 ft)
- Length: 105 metres (344 ft)

Reservoir
- Creates: Loskop Dam reservoir
- Total capacity: 361,500,000 cubic metres (1.277×10^{10} cu ft)
- Catchment area: 12,285 square kilometres (4,743 sq mi)
- Surface area: 2,427.7 hectares (5,999 acres)

Loskop Dam is a combined gravity and arch type dam located on the Olifants River, near Groblersdal, Mpumalanga, South Africa. It was established in 1939 and has been renovated in 1979. The dam is situated in the Loskop Dam Nature Reserve and it serves mainly for irrigation purposes. The hazard potential of the dam has been ranked high (3).

== History ==
A popular vacation spot that irrigates the majority of the Bushveld, the Loskop Dam was first proposed in 1905 and started as a private cooperative scheme by landowners along the Olifants in 1930, but officially only endorsed by the government in 1934. In 1939, the project was completed under the auspices of the Department of Irrigation (today's Department of Environmental Affairs) at the cost of R5 million, employing among others Willem J. Grobler, on whose Klipbank Farm his namesake town of Groblersdal was founded in 1938 as the canal network's hub.

The scheme stretches 64 km to the north of this town, including 148 km on 2 main pipes and 330 km of branch lines irrigating 19,000 ha; 250 km of drainage canals return excess water from farm to river. Most Loskop farms use sprinklers, but a growing portion use central pivot irrigation. An innovative feature of the dam is the use of "breakers," 6-m-high structures above the walls that divert floodwaters into colliding streams called "heavy rain" with less destructive potential. 650 farms covering around 25.7 ha each use the water, including a small proportion originally reserved for the elderly and disabled.

The subtropical climate supports the growth of many crops, but summer tobacco and cotton and winter wheat are the main standbys, as well as table grapes and vegetables on a smaller scale. On March 6, 1940, the Transvaal Provincial Council established a nature reserve in the area, a popular angling spot for Mozambique tilapia, redbreast tilapia, yellowfish, carp, mudfish, and eel. Boasting a modern RV park and extensive recreational facilities, the reserve covers 12,700 ha. Large game has been bred there since 1948 - indeed, a breeding pair of white rhinoceros were brought there in 1963 to bear a calf there on April 11, 1964, returning the species to the area after its extinction in the Transvaal in 1896. The reserve also features other types of rhinoceros, ostriches, leopard, giraffes, blue wildebeest, zebra, among others.

== See also ==
- List of reservoirs and dams in South Africa
- List of rivers of South Africa

== Sources ==
- Erasmus, B.P.J. (1995). Op Pad in Suid-Afrika. ISBN 1-86842-026-4
- Wêreldspektrum, 1982, ISBN 0908409583, vol 17, p. 126
