= Romansrivier =

Romansrivier Dwarsrivier
- Location within Western Cape Location within South Africa
- Coordinates: 33°28′08″S 19°12′51″E
- Country: South Africa
- Province: Western Cape
- District: Cape Winelands
- Municipality: Witzenberg

Area
  - Total: 0.09 km^{2} (0.035 sq mi)
- Elevation: 460 m (1,510 ft)

Population (2001)
  - Total: 506
  - Density: 5,600/km^{2} (15,000/sq mi)
- Time zone: UTC+2 (SAST)
- Postal code (street): 0812
- PO box: 0812

Romansrivier, in Ward 2 Dwarsrivier, is a settlement in Witzenberg Local Municipality, Cape Winelands District Municipality, Western Cape province, South Africa. It is in the upper Breede River Valley region. The R43 route runs north–south past the settlement. The Romansrivier railway station is located just south of the settlement. The Witteberg Nature Reserve is just east of the settlement.

== History ==
When the Dutch arrived in the Dwarsrivier area it was inhabited by the San people (Bushmen). Dutch "Free Burghers" (vryburgers) first settled there in 1687.
