= Blyderivierpoort Dam =

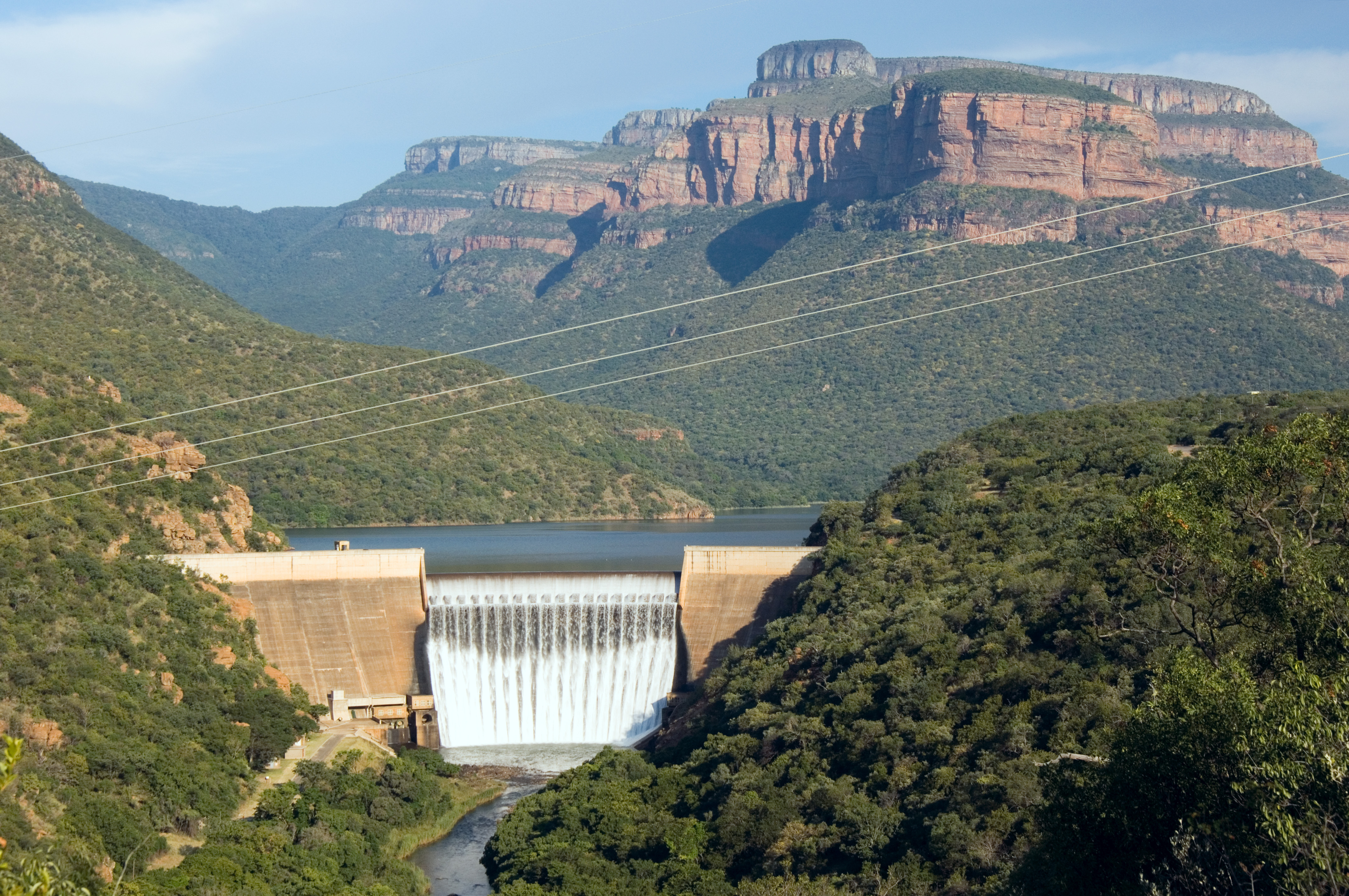
- View from the north
- Interactive map of Blyderivierpoort Dam
- Official name: Blyderivierpoort Dam; Blyde River Poort Dam
- Country: South Africa
- Location: Mpumalanga
- Coordinates: 24°32′12″S 30°47′53″E
- Purpose: Irrigation, industrial
- Opening date: 1974
- Owner: Department of Water Affairs

Dam and spillways
- Type of dam: Arch-gravity dam
- Impounds: Blyde River
- Height: 71 m
- Length: 240 m

Reservoir
- Creates: Blyderivierpoort Dam Reservoir
- Total capacity: 54 050 000 m³
- Surface area: 240 ha

Blyderivierpoort Dam is a gravity-arch dam on the Blyde River, in the lower Blyde River Canyon, near Hoedspruit in Mpumalanga, South Africa. It also floods the lower reaches of the Blyde's Ohrigstad River tributary. The dam was completed in 1974. The 71 m high dam wall and 22 m deep is situated 3 km from Swadini resort by road.

== Purpose ==
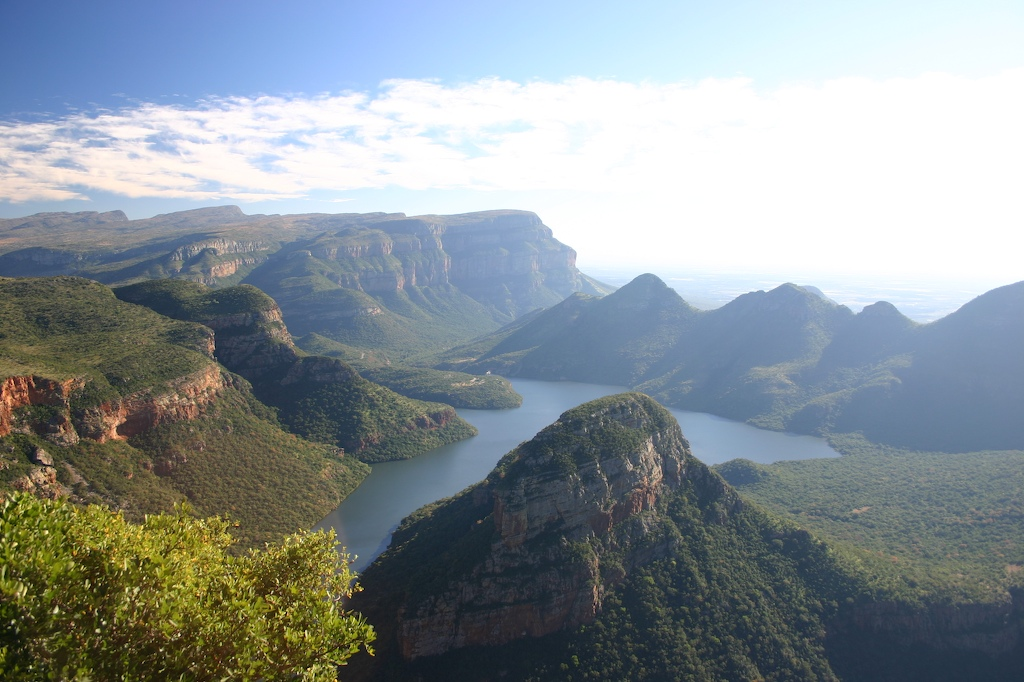
The water body seen from the south

Its fundamental purpose is to provide a stable water supply for irrigators of the Blyde River Irrigation district and to provide additional water for mining and industry at Phalaborwa.

== Irrigation district ==
Orchards and croplands were established along the lower Blyde in the latter half of the 20th century, with 23,521 ha devoted to irrigation in 1995.

== Resettlement ==
During 1965, the community that lived at the site of the proposed dam was resettled (with compensation) by the government to nearby towns, including Buffelshoek, Acornhoek, Beverleyshoek and Bushbuckridge. Some stone-walled settlements, cultural artifacts, and graves are now submerged under the dam.

== See also ==
- List of reservoirs and dams in South Africa
- List of rivers of South Africa
