= Bronkhorst Spruit =

River in South Africa

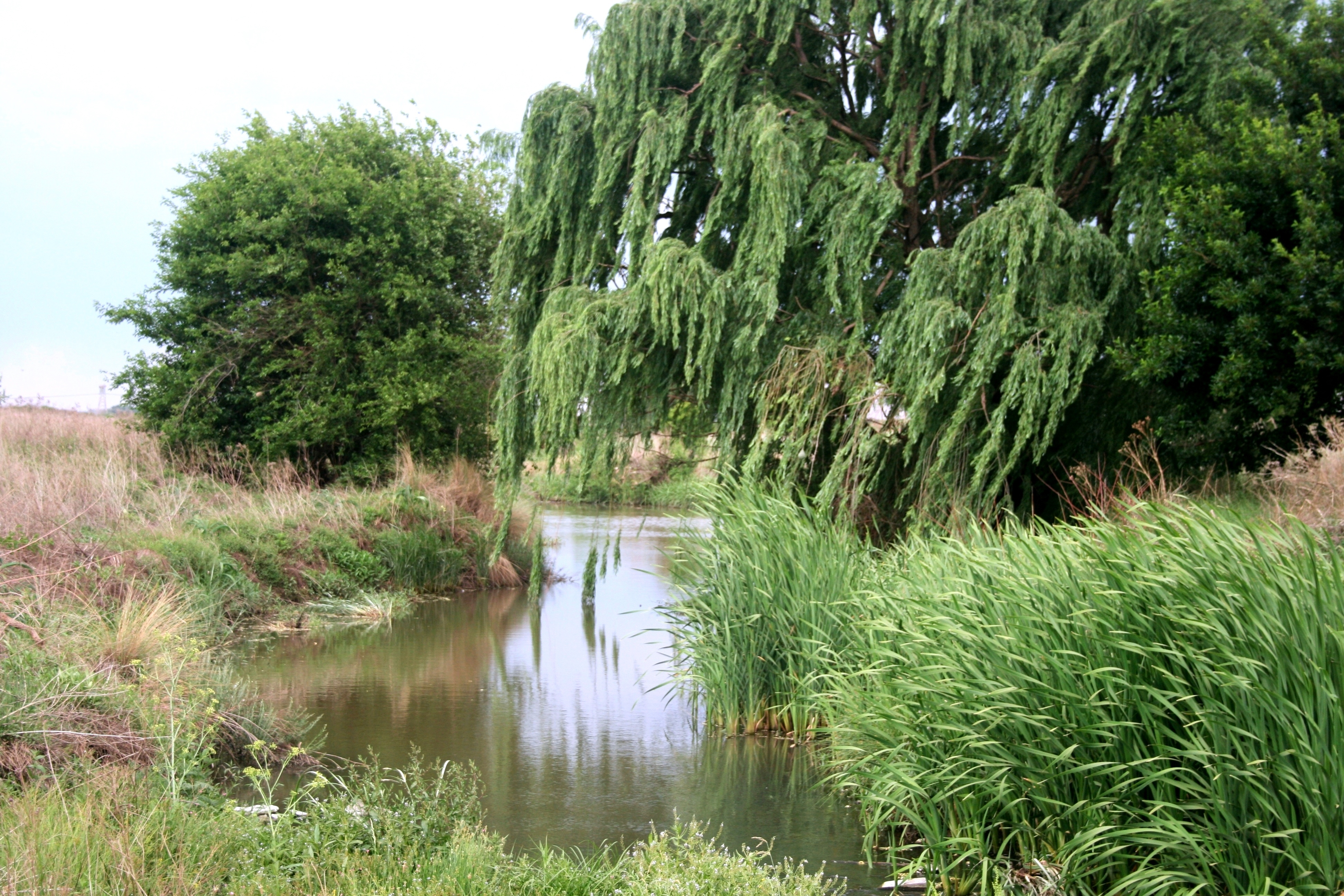

- Location within South Africa
- Etymology: Likely named after "bronkors" or "bronkhorst" the Afrikaans word for watercress (Nasturtium officinale)

Location
- Country: South Africa
- State: Gauteng and Mpumalanga

Physical characteristics
- Source: Witwatersrand
  - location: East of Springs, Gauteng
  - elevation: 1,630 m (5,350 ft)
- Mouth: Wilge River (Olifants)
  - location: East of Bronkhorstspruit
  - coordinates: 25°48′30″S 28°51′10″E
  - elevation: 1,370 m (4,490 ft)

Basin features
- Tributaries
  - left: Delmas River

The Bronkhorst Spruit, meaning watercress stream or creek, is a river in the Mpumalanga and Gauteng provinces of South Africa. In the 19th century it as was known as the Kalkoenkransrivier or Rhenosterpoortrivier. It is a tributary of the Wilge River in the Olifants River basin, and it lends its name to the town of Bronkhorstspruit, situated mainly on its right bank.

== Course ==
Its sources are located in the highveld grasslands of western Mpumalanga, about 30 km to the ESE of Springs, Gauteng. It flows generally northwards and its main tributary, the Delmas River, joins its left bank. Further downstream it flows into the Bronkhorstspruit Dam, situated in eastern Gauteng. Then before it bends northeastwards it passes by the Bronkhorstspruit urban area. It finally has a confluence with the Wilge River some 10 km east of the town, at Premiermyn Dam, Gauteng.

== History ==
When a group of Voortrekkers arrived at it in 1858, they called it the Kalkoenkransrivier, suggesting a breeding site of bald ibis, and on Merensky's map of 1875 it (including the current lower Wilge) is the Rhenosterpoortrivier. In 1880 this river was the scene of the action at Bronkhorstspruit, a battle between a Boer commando under the command of Frans Joubert and British troops under Lieutenant-Colonel Anstruther. It was one of the first serious clashes in the early days of the First Boer War.

== Dams in the river ==
- Bronkhorstspruit Dam
- Premiermyn Dam

== See also ==
- List of rivers of South Africa
- List of reservoirs and dams in South Africa
