= Flag Boshielo Dam =

Flag Boshielo Dam Arabie Dam
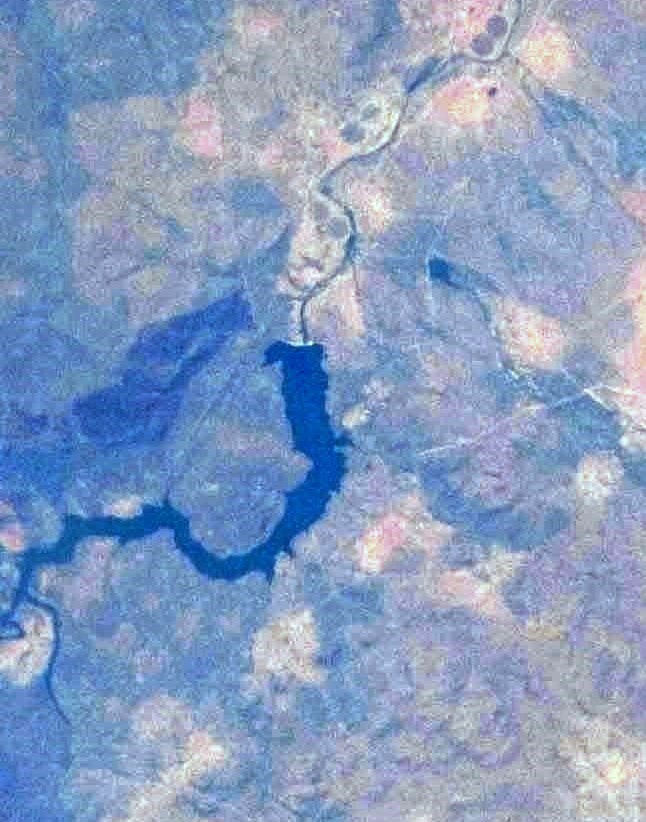
- Seen from space, 2012
- Interactive map of Flag Boshielo Dam; Arabie Dam
- Official name: Flag Boshielo Dam
- Location: Limpopo, South Africa
- Coordinates: 24°47′0″S 29°25′40″E
- Opening date: 1987
- Operators: Department of Water Affairs and Forestry

Dam and spillways
- Impounds: Olifants River
- Height: 36 m
- Length: 1225 m

Reservoir
- Creates: Flag Boshielo Dam Reservoir
- Total capacity: 185 100 000 m³
- Surface area: 1288 ha

Flag Boshielo Dam is a water reservoir on the Olifants River, near Marble Hall, Limpopo, South Africa. It was established in 1987 and is named after activist Flag Boshielo.

== See also ==
- List of reservoirs and dams in South Africa
- List of rivers of South Africa
