= List of rivers of South Africa =

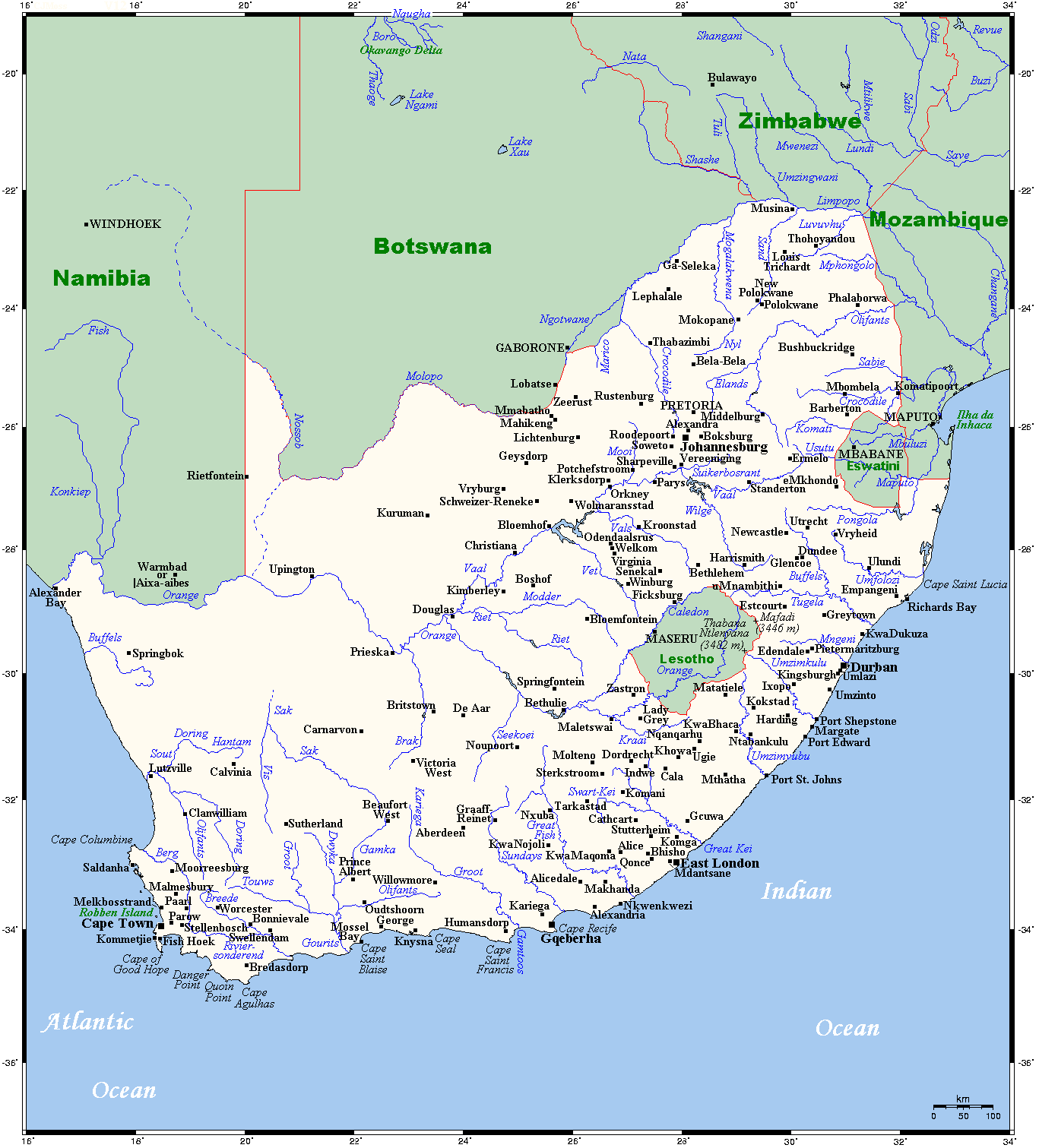
A map showing South Africa's cities, main towns, selected villages, rivers, and its highest peak.

This is a list of rivers in South Africa.

It is quite common to find the Afrikaans word -rivier as part of the name. Another common suffix is "-kamma", from the Khoisan term for "river" (often tautologically the English term "river" is added to the name). The Zulu / Xhosa word amanzi (water) also forms part of some river names.

The Afrikaans term spruit (compare spring) often labels small rivers.

== List ==
River	Drainage basin^{[A]}	Province and location	Source location (town / mountains)	Tributary of (river)	Dam in river	Mouth / junction at location (town)	Mouth / junction coordinates
Amandawe River	U8	Amandawe, KwaZulu-Natal	north west of Amandawe	north of Scottburgh		Umpambanyoni River	30°15′30″S 30°45′0″E
Amahlongwa River	U8	Amahlongwa, KwaZulu-Natal	south west of Amahlongwa	west of uMkomaas		Indian Ocean	30°15′30″S 30°44′0″E
Amanzimtoti River, (Manzimtoti River) (Toti River)	U7	KwaZulu-Natal, Amanzimtoti	northwest of Adams Mission			Indian Ocean	30°3′S 30°52′E
Apies River	A2	Gauteng, Tshwane, Pretoria	Bronberg, southeast of Pretoria	Moretele River, then Crocodile River and Limpopo River	Bon Accord Dam	Makapanstad	25°14′24″S 28°08′36″E
As River (or Axel River)	C8	Free State	Southeast of Bethlehem	Liebenbergsvlei River, then Wilge River	Sol Plaatjie Dam		28°13′27″S 28°21′58″E
Assegaai River	W5	Mpumalanga	North of Wakkerstroom	Mkondo River	Heyshope Dam	Swaziland border	27°04′46″S 31°02′19″E
Baakens River		Eastern Cape	Port Elizabeth				
Bamboes Spruit	C2	North West	South of Ottosdal	Vaal River	Bloemhof Dam		27°40′15″S 25°37′40″E
Baviaanskloof River	L8	Western and Eastern Cape	North of Plettenberg Bay	Kouga River			33°39′53″S 24°23′37″E
Bell River	D1	Eastern Cape	Near Naudé's Neck	Kraai River, then Orange River		Near Moshesh's Ford	30°51′08″S 27°46′43″E
Berg River (or Great Berg River)	G1	Western Cape	Franschhoek Drakenstein		Berg River Dam	Velddrif north of Vredenburg, Atlantic Ocean	32°46′13.00″S 18°8′39.66″E
Berg River	D3	Free State	22 km Southwest of Jagersfontein	Orange River	Vanderkloof Dam	Vanderkloof Dam	29°59′43″S 24°46′48″E
Bhira River	R5	Eastern Cape	North of Eleqolweni			between Port Alfred and East London, near Begha, Indian Ocean	33°23′00″S 27°19′33″E
Bivane River	W5	KwaZulu-Natal		Pongola River	Bivane Dam		
Black Kei River		Eastern Cape	Southwest of Queenstown	Great Kei River			
Blesbokspruit (or Blesbok Spruit)	C2	Gauteng	North of Daveyton	Vaal River			
Blood River (or Ncome River)	V3	KwaZulu-Natal	Knight's Pass, Utrecht	Buffalo River			
Bloukrans River	V1	KwaZulu-Natal	North of Giant's Castle in the Drakensberg foothills	Tugela River	none	near Tugela Estates, Weenen area	28°45′30″S 30°08′55″E
Bloukrans River	K	Western and Eastern Cape border	Near Peak Formosa	n.a.		Near Bloukrans Bridge	33°58′44″S 23°38′49″E
Bloukrans River		Eastern Cape	Near Grahamstown	Kowie River	none	Near Langholm, Grahamstown	33°24′38″S 26°39′05″E
Blyde River (or Motlatse River)	B6	Mpumalanga	West of Sabie	Olifants River	Blyderivierpoort Dam	Lissataba game farm, Mica area	24°15′13″S 30°49′50″E
Boesmans River		Western Cape	Northeast of Pearly Beach	Uilkraal River		Uilkraalsmond (south of Gans Bay), Atlantic Ocean	34°36′21″S 19°24′32″E
Boesmans River		Eastern Cape	North of Kirkwood (Eastern Cape)			Kenton on Sea, Indian Ocean	33°41′32″S 26°39′50″E
Boesmanspruit (or Boesman Spruit)		Mpumalanga	South of Secunda	Waterval River then into the Vaal River			
Bonte River		Western Cape			Alphen Dam		
Bot River	G	Western Cape	South of Teewaterskloof Dam		Fortuin Reservoir	Fischerhaven, Atlantic Ocean	34°22′05″S 19°05′53″E
Braamfontein Spruit (or Braamfonteinspruit)		Gauteng	Greymont Roodepoort	Jukskei River	Emmarentia Dam		
Brak River	A7	Limpopo		Sand River (Polokwane)	Magkabeng Plateau		22°36′15″S 29°44′0″E
Breede River (or Breë River)	H	Western Cape, Overberg	near Ceres the Koekedou River and Dwars River become the Bree River			West of Mossel Bay, Indian Ocean	34°24′15″S 20°51′06″E
Bronkhorst Spruit (or Bronkhorstspruit)	B2	Gauteng		Wilge River	Bronkhorstspruit Dam		
Buffeljags River		Western Cape	joining of the Tredou River and Grootvadersbos River	Breede River	Buffeljags Dam		
Buffalo River (Eastern Cape)	R2	Eastern Cape	Northwest of King William's Town		Laing Dam, Bridle Drift Dam	East London harbour	33°01′45″S 27°54′57″E
Buffalo River (KwaZulu-Natal)	V3	KwaZulu-Natal	northeast of Volksrust	Tugela River			
Buffels River	F3	Northern Cape					29.67642°S 17.051811°E
Buffels River	J1	Western Cape	The Komsberg River and the Venters River, join to become the Buffels River		Floriskraal Dam	at Buffelspoort, the Klein-Swartberg River joins the Buffels River to become the Groot River	33.467929°S 20.983973°E
Bushman River	V	KwaZulu-Natal	at Giant's Castle	Tugela River	Wagendrift Dam		
Caledon River	D2	Free State border Lesotho and South Africa	southwest of Witsieshoek	Orange River	Knellpoort Dam, Welbedacht Dam	Bethulie	30°31′0″S 26°5′46″E
Chalumna River (or Tyolomnqa River)	R4	Eastern Cape					
Crocodile River	X3	Mpumalanga	North of Dullstroom	Komati River	Kwena Dam	Komatipoort	
Crocodile River	A3	North West, Gauteng and Limpopo	Roodepoort	Limpopo River	Hartbeespoort Dam Roodekoppies Dam		
Diep River	G	Western Cape	North of Malmesbury			Table Bay Cape Town	33°53′27″S 18°22′55″E
Diep River	A7	Limpopo	Southeast of Polokwane	Sand River			
Doring River		Western Cape and Eastern Cape	Northeast of Ceres	Olifants River	Doring River Dam		
Duiwenhoks River		Western Cape	North of Heidelberg			West of Mossel Bay, Indian Ocean	34°21′56″S 21°00′01″E
Elands River	B2	Gauteng	Near Rayton	Olifants River	Rust de Winter Dam, Rhenosterkop Dam	Marble Hall	24°55′27″S 29°20′45″E
Elands River	A	North West Province	Near Koster	Crocodile River (West)	Vaalkop Dam		24°17′18″S 27°31′8″E
Elands River	X3	Mpumalanga	Northeast of Belfast	Crocodile River (East)			
Ga-Selati River		Limpopo	Wolkberg	Olifants River		South of Phalaborwa	
Gamka River	J	Western Cape	North of Beaufort West	Gourits River	Gamkapoort Dam	South of Calitzdorp	
Gamtoos River	L9	Eastern Cape	The Kouga River and Groot River become the Gamtoos River			Northeast of Jeffreys Bay	33°58′12″S 25°02′03″E
Gouritz River (or Gourits River)		Western Cape	The Gamka River and Olifants River become the Gourits River			at Gouritsmond	34°20′47″S 21°53′08″E
Great Fish River (Groot-Vis River)		Eastern Cape	East of Graaff-Reinet			North of Seafield, Indian Ocean	33°29′44″S 27°08′09″E
Groenrivier (Green River)		Northern Cape				About 120 km NNW of Strandfontein by Green River Mouth Lighthouse	
Great Kei River (Groot-Kei)		Eastern Cape	The Swart-Kei River and the White Kei River become the Great Kei River			Kei Mouth, Indian Ocean	32°40′45″S 28°23′07″E
Great Letaba River	B8	Limpopo	The Great Letaba River and Little Letaba River become the Letaba River	Letaba River	Ebenezer Dam		
Great Usutu River (or Maputo River)	W5	KwaZulu-Natal, Swaziland and Mozambique	Northwest of Amsterdam			South of Maputo, Mozambique	26°10′22″S 32°41′45″E
Great Brak River	K	Western Cape		Perdeberg River, Tweeriviere River and Varings River	Wolwedans Dam	Great Brak River, Indian Ocean	
Groot Brak River		Eastern Cape	North of Steynsburg	Teebusspruit		Great Fish River	
Groot Marico River (or Great Marico River)		North West					
Groot River		Eastern Cape	where the Kariega River and Sout River join	Gamtoos River	Beervlei Dam		
Groot River		partly the border between Eastern Cape and Western Cape	The Buffels River becomes the Groot River from where the Klein-Swartberg River joins the Buffels	Gouritz River	Beervlei Dam		
Groot River		Western Cape		Doring River			
Groot Vet River		Free State					
Groot Vlei River		Eastern Cape					
Hantams River		Northern Cape					
Hartbees River		Northern Cape					
Hartenbos River		Western Cape					
Harts River		North West					
Hennops River		Gauteng	East of Tembisa	Crocodile River			
Heuningnesrivier		Western Cape					
Hex River	H	Western Cape		Breede River			
Hex River		North West		Elands River	Bospoort Dam		
Hluhluwe River	W	KwaZulu-Natal	Hluhluwe Game Reserve	Hluhluwe River	Hluhluwe Dam lake St Lucia		
Hoeksrivier		Western Cape					
Hol River		Eastern Cape					
Honde River		Gauteng					
Hout River	A7	Limpopo		Sand River (Polokwane)		Hout River Dam	23°4′2″S 29°34′45″E
Incomati River		Mpumalanga					
Indwe River		Eastern Cape				Lubisi Dam	
Ingulube	C2	Gauteng	West of Nigel	Spaarwater	Vaal River		
Intombe River		KwaZulu-Natal					
Jakkals River		Western Cape					
Jordaan River		Free State					
Jordaanspruit		Free State			Bloemhoek Dam		
Jukskei River		Gauteng		Crocodile River (West) then Limpopo River			
Kaaimans River		Western Cape					
Kabeljous River		Eastern Cape				Jeffreys Bay	34°00′19″S 24°56′08″E
Kaalspruit		Free State					
Kaba River		KwaZulu-Natal					
Kamma River		Western Cape					
Kammanassie River		Eastern Cape					
Kandandlovu River		KwaZulu-Natal					
Karatara River		Eastern Cape					
Karoospruit		Free State					
Kat River		Eastern Cape, Seymour, Fort Beaufort	Amatola Mountains	Great Fish River	Katrivier Dam	Great Fish River south of Fort Beaufort	32°59′44″S 26°47′05″E
Kat Spruit		Mpumalanga					
Kariega River		Eastern Cape			Settlers Dam	Kenton-on-Sea	
Keisers River		Western Cape					
Keiskamma River	R1	Eastern Cape	Amatola Mountains		Sandile Dam	Hamburg northeast of Port Alfred, Indian Ocean	33°17′S 27°29′E
Keurbooms River		Western Cape, Plettenberg Bay				Northeast of Plettenberg Bay, Indian Ocean	
Kingna River		Western Cape					
Klaas Smits River		Eastern Cape	South of Molteno	Swart-Kei River			
Klaserie River		Mpumalanga					
Klasies River		Eastern Cape, Tsitsikamma coast	Klasies River Caves				
Little Letaba River	B8	Limpopo	The Great Letaba River and Little Letaba River become the Letaba River	Letaba River			
Klein Marico River		North West					
Klein Olifants River		Mpumalanga					
Klein River		Western Cape				Hermanus, Indian Ocean	34°25′17″S 19°18′03″E
Klip River		Gauteng					
Klip River		Western Cape					
Klip River		KwaZulu-Natal					
Klip River		Eastern Cape					
Knysna River		Western Cape					
Kobongaba River		Eastern Cape					
Komani River		Eastern Cape	North of Queenstown	Klaas Smits River	Bongolo Dam		
Komati River (or Incomati, Nkomati)	X1	Mpumalanga, Komati Gorge					
Koshwana River		KwaZulu-Natal					
Kouga River	L8	Eastern Cape					
Kowie River		Eastern Cape	Grahamstown				Port Alfred
Kraai River	D1	Eastern Cape	Confluence of Bell River, Sterkspruit and Joggem River at Moshesh's Ford, Eastern Cape Drakensberg	Orange River		Aliwal North	30°40′S 26°45′E
Kromdraai Spruit		Mpumalanga					
Krom River		Eastern Cape					
Krom River		Western Cape, Stellenbosch					
Kuils River		Western Cape					
Kwenxura River		Eastern Cape					
Laai Spruit		Free State					
Langvlei River		Western Cape					
Latonyanda River		Limpopo					
Liesbeek River (also spelt Liesbeeck)		Western Cape					
Leeu River		Free State			Armenia Dam		
Levubu River (or Luvuvhu, Pafuri River)	A9	Limpopo			Albasini Dam	Limpopo River	22°25′32″S 31°18′25″E
Lephalala River (see Palala River)	A5	Limpopo			Vischgat Dam, Susandale Dam		
Letaba River	B8	Limpopo	The Great Letaba River and Little Letaba River become the Letaba River	Olifants River			
Liebenbergsvlei River	C8	Free State					
Liesbeeck River		Western Cape					
Letsitele River		Limpopo					
Liesbeek River		Western Cape, Cape Town					
Limpopo River	A	Limpopo, on Zimbabwe, Botswana borders	The Marico River and the Crocodile River become the Limpopo River			Xai-Xai, Mozambique into Indian Ocean	
Little Brak River (or Klein Brak)		Eastern Cape				Little Brak River, Indian Ocean	34°05′31″S 22°08′55″E
Lourens River		Western Cape					
Lovu River(Illovu)	U7	KwaZulu-Natal	West of Richmond		Beaulieu Estate Dam	Lovu Langoon at Illovu Beach, Indian Ocean	30°6′S 30°51′E
Lower Brandvlei River		Western Cape			Brandvlei Dam		
Lunsklip River		Mpumalanga					
Lyndoch River		Eastern Cape					
Maitland River	M	Eastern Cape				West of Port Elizabeth	33°59′14″S 25°17′37″E
Malips River		Limpopo Province	Olifants River (Limpopo)				
Maputo River (or Great Usutu)		Mpumalanga, KwaZulu-Natal					
Marico River	A2	North West	Groot-Marico River	Limpopo River			
Matlabas River		Limpopo					
Mbhashe River		Eastern Cape, Transkei region	East of Elliot			South of The Haven, Eastern Cape	32°14′56″S 28°54′00″E
Mbango River		KwaZulu-Natal					
Mbizana River		KwaZulu-Natal					
Mbodi River		Limpopo					
Mbokodweni River		KwaZulu-Natal					
Mdesingane River		KwaZulu-Natal					
Mdlotane River		KwaZulu-Natal					
Mdloti River		KwaZulu-Natal					
Mdumbe River		Eastern Cape					
Mgobezeleni River		KwaZulu-Natal					
Mgwalana River		Eastern Cape					
Mhlabatshane River		KwaZulu-Natal					
Middle Letaba River	B8	Limpopo					
Mlalazi River		KwaZulu-Natal					
Mhlali River		KwaZulu-Natal					
Mhlatuze River	W	KwaZulu-Natal					
Mkomazi River		Kwazulu-Natal					
Mkuze River	W	KwaZulu-Natal					
Mlazi River		KwaZulu-Natal, Durban					
Mngeni River (or Mgeni, Umgeni)	U	KwaZulu-Natal				north of Durban, Indian Ocean	
Modder River		Northern Cape and Free State		Riet River			
Mogalakwena River	A6	Limpopo		Limpopo River			
Mokolo River (or Mogol River)	A4	Limpopo	The Sand River and Grootspruit River become the Mokolo River	Limpopo	Mokolo Dam		
Molopo River	D4	North West border Botswana			Disaneng Dam		
Mooi River	V	KwaZulu-Natal		Tugela River			
Mooi River		North West		Vaal River	Boskop Dam		
Mooi River	T	Eastern Cape					
Mpenjati River		KwaZulu-Natal	Near Hamburg			Palm Beach	30°55′59″S 30°16′00″E
Msunduzi River (or Duzi River)		KwaZulu-Natal					
Mthatha River		Eastern Cape					
Mtamvuna River		KwaZulu-Natal - Eastern Cape border					
Mtontwanes River		KwaZulu-Natal					
Mugwenya River		KwaZulu-Natal					
Mximkulwana River		KwaZulu-Natal					
Mzamba River		Eastern Cape, Transkei region					
Mzimkulu River (or Umzimkulu)		KwaZulu-Natal					
Mzimkulwana river		KwaZulu-Natal, Oribi Gorge					
Mzimvubu River		Eastern Cape, Transkei region					
Mzumbe River		KwaZulu-Natal					
Nahoon River	R3	Eastern Cape, East London					
Ngagane River		KwaZulu-Natal					
Ngotwane River		North West					
Ngwavuma		KwaZulu-Natal		Pongola River			26°57′42″S 32°17′39″E
Nossob River	D4	Northern Cape, Kalahari					
Nqabara River		Eastern Cape					
Nsama River		Limpopo					
Nsuze River	V4	KwaZulu-Natal		Tugela River			
Nswamanzi River		KwaZulu-Natal					
Nuwejaarspruit		Free State					
Nyalazi River		KwaZulu-Natal					
Nyl River		Limpopo					
Nyoni River		KwaZulu-Natal					
Nzhelele River	A8	Limpopo					
Nwanedi River		Limpopo					
Ohlanga River (or Umhlanga)		KwaZulu-Natal					
Ohrigstad River		Mpumalanga					
Olifants River	B	Mpumalanga and Limpopo			Loskop Dam, Flag Boshielo Dam		
Olifants River		Western Cape Oudtshoorn					
Olifants River		Western Cape			Clanwilliam Dam		
Ongers River		Northern Cape					
Oompies River		Eastern Cape					
Orange River (or Gariep River)		Eastern Cape, Northern Cape and Free State			Gariep Dam, Vanderkloof Dam, Boegoeberg Dam	Atlantic Ocean at Alexander Bay, Northern Cape	29°35′S 16°29′E
Os Spruit		Gauteng					
Palala River (or Lephalala)	A5	Limpopo					
Palmiet River		Western Cape			Eikenhof Dam		
Pienaars River	A2	Gauteng and Northwest	northwest of Bronkhorstspruit	Crocodile River	Roodeplaat Dam, Klipvoor Dam		
Pienaars River		Eastern Cape					
Plankenbrug River		Western Cape					
Poesjenels River		Western Cape					
Pongola River (or Phongolo)	W5	KwaZulu-Natal					
Riet River		Free State		Vaal River			
Riet River (Eastern Cape)		Eastern Cape					
Rietspruit		Free State					
Riviersonderend (or Sonderend River)		Western Cape, Overberg					
Rondegat River		Western Cape					
Rooiels River		Western Cape					
Rufanes River		Eastern Cape					
Saalboom River		Eastern Cape		Kraai River, then Orange River,			30.95°S 27.45°E
Sabie River		Mpumalanga	X3	Incomati River, Mozambique			
Sak River		Northern Cape					
Salt River		Western Cape Cape Town					
Sand River	A	Limpopo Province		Limpopo River			
Sand River		Free State		Vet River	Allemanskraal Dam		
Sandspruit		Free State					
Sandlundlu River		KwaZulu-Natal					
Sandpoort River		Eastern Cape					
Selons River	B2	Mpumalanga	Highveld east of Middelburg	Olifants River		Near Loskop Dam	25°22′15″S 29°23′42″E
Smalblaar River		Western Cape					
Sout River		Western Cape, Cape Town					
Spoeg River		Northern Cape				About 18 km SSE of Hondeklip Bay	
Steelpoort River		Mpumalanga					
Steenbras River		Western Cape			Steenbras Upper Dam; Steenbras Dam	South of Gordon's Bay	
Sterkstroom River		North West			Buffelspoort Dam		
Storms River		Eastern Cape					
Suikerbosrand River	C2	Gauteng				Vereeniging	
Sundays River	V1	KwaZulu-Natal		Tugela River			
Sundays River	M1	Eastern Cape			Darlington Dam		
Swart River		Western Cape	North of Caledon	Bot River			
Swartkops River		Eastern Cape, Nelson Mandela Bay				Bluewater Bay, Indian Ocean	
Tamboti River		Limpopo					
Tarka River		Eastern Cape					
Tele River		Eastern Cape	Southern Drakensberg	Orange River		near Palmietfontein	30.4049°S 27.5583°E
Timbavati River		Mpumalanga		Olifants River		near Olifants Camp, Kruger National Park	24°3′18″S 31°40′39″E
Tongati River		KwaZulu-Natal					
Touws River		Western Cape		Groot River			
Treur River	B6	Limpopo					
Troe-Troe River		Northern Cape					
Tsitsikamma River		Eastern Cape					
Tsomo River		Eastern Cape					
Tugela River	V	KwaZulu-Natal					
Tyhume River		Eastern Cape		Keiskamma River	Binfield Park Dam	South-east of Alice	32°54′50″S 26°56′14″E
Uilkraal River		Western Cape				Gans Bay, Atlantic Ocean	34°36′22″S 19°24′33″E
Umbilo River		KwaZulu-Natal					
Umfolozi River (Zulu: Mfolozi)	W	KwaZulu-Natal				Maphelana, Indian Ocean	28°23′52″S 32°25′27″E
Black Umfolozi River (Zulu: Mfolozi emnyama)		KwaZulu-Natal					
White Umfolozi River (Zulu: Mfolozi emhlophe)		KwaZulu-Natal					
Wilge River (Mpumalanga)	B2	Mpumalanga		Olifants River			
Wilge River (Free State)	C8	Free State			Vaal Dam		
Umgeni River(uMngeni)	U2	KwaZulu-Natal	East of Howick		Midmar Dam, Albert Falls Dam, Inanda Dam, Nagle Dam	near Durban, Indian Ocean	29°48′S 31°2′E
Umvoti River (or Mvoti River)	U	KwaZulu-Natal					
Umzimkulu River (Zulu: Mzimkulu)		KwaZulu-Natal					
Usutu River		Mpumalanga					
Uvuzana River		KwaZulu-Natal					
Vaal River	C	Free State and other	North of Ermelo, Mpumalanga	Orange River	Bloemhof Dam, Vaal Dam, Douglas Weir		
Vals River		Free State		Vaal River			
Van Stadens River		Eastern Cape					
Verlorevlei River		Western Cape				Elands Bay Atlantic Ocean	32°18′54″S 18°20′15″E
Vet River		Free State		Vaal River			
Vier-en-twintig-riviere (English: 24 Rivers)		Western Cape					
Waterval River		Mpumalanga					
White Kei River		Eastern Cape	North of Queenstown	Great Kei River			
Wilge River	C8	Free State					
Wilge River		Mpumalanga					
Wit River		Eastern Cape					
Wit River		Limpopo					
Woes-Alleen River		Mpumalanga			Boschmanskop No 1 Dam		
Wonderfonteinspruit							
Xilinxa River		Eastern Cape			Xilinxa Dam		
Xora River		Eastern Cape					
Xuka River		Eastern Cape					
Zandvlei		Western Cape					
Zimbani River		Eastern Cape					
Zinkwasi River		KwaZulu-Natal					
Zotsha River		KwaZulu-Natal					

- A Drainage basin code assigned by the Department of Water Affairs (South Africa), a complete list is available at Drainage basins of South Africa

== Gallery ==
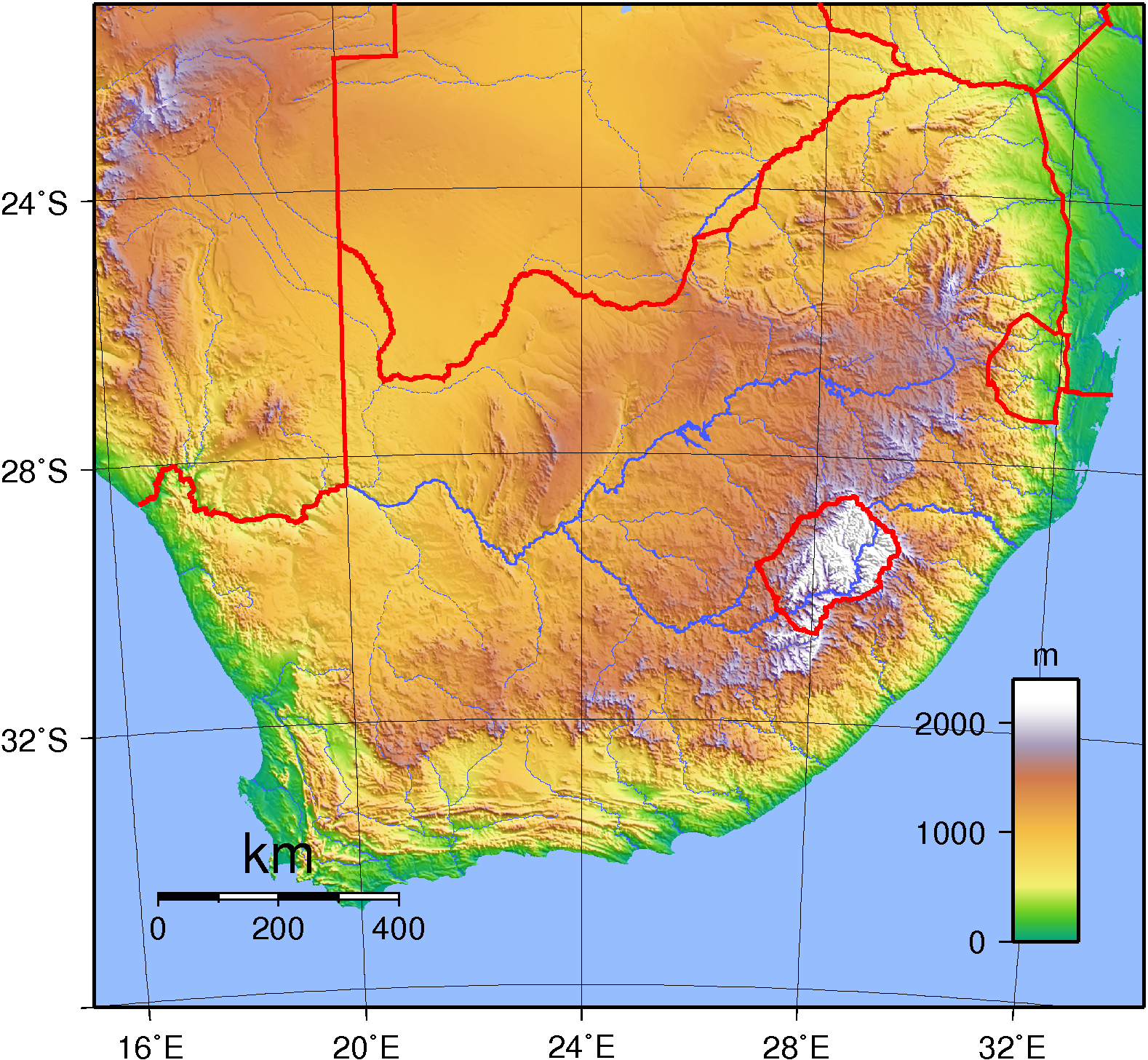
Topographic map of South Africa.

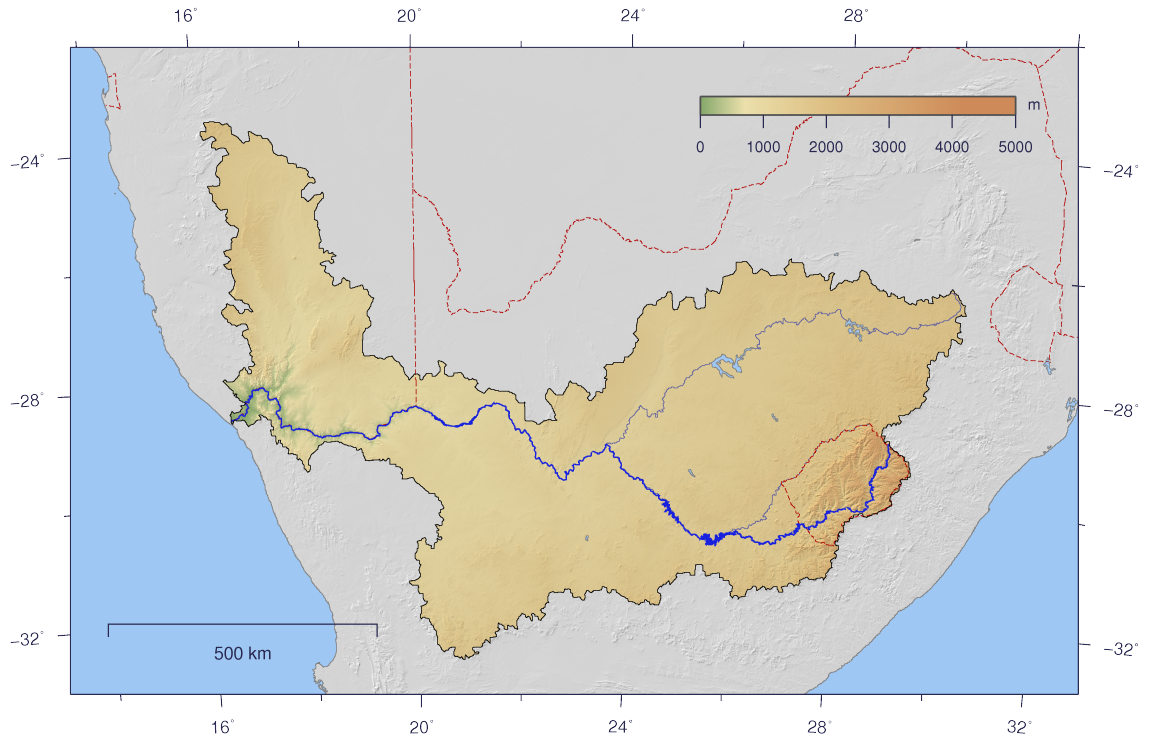
Course and watershed of the Orange River with topography shading and political boundaries.

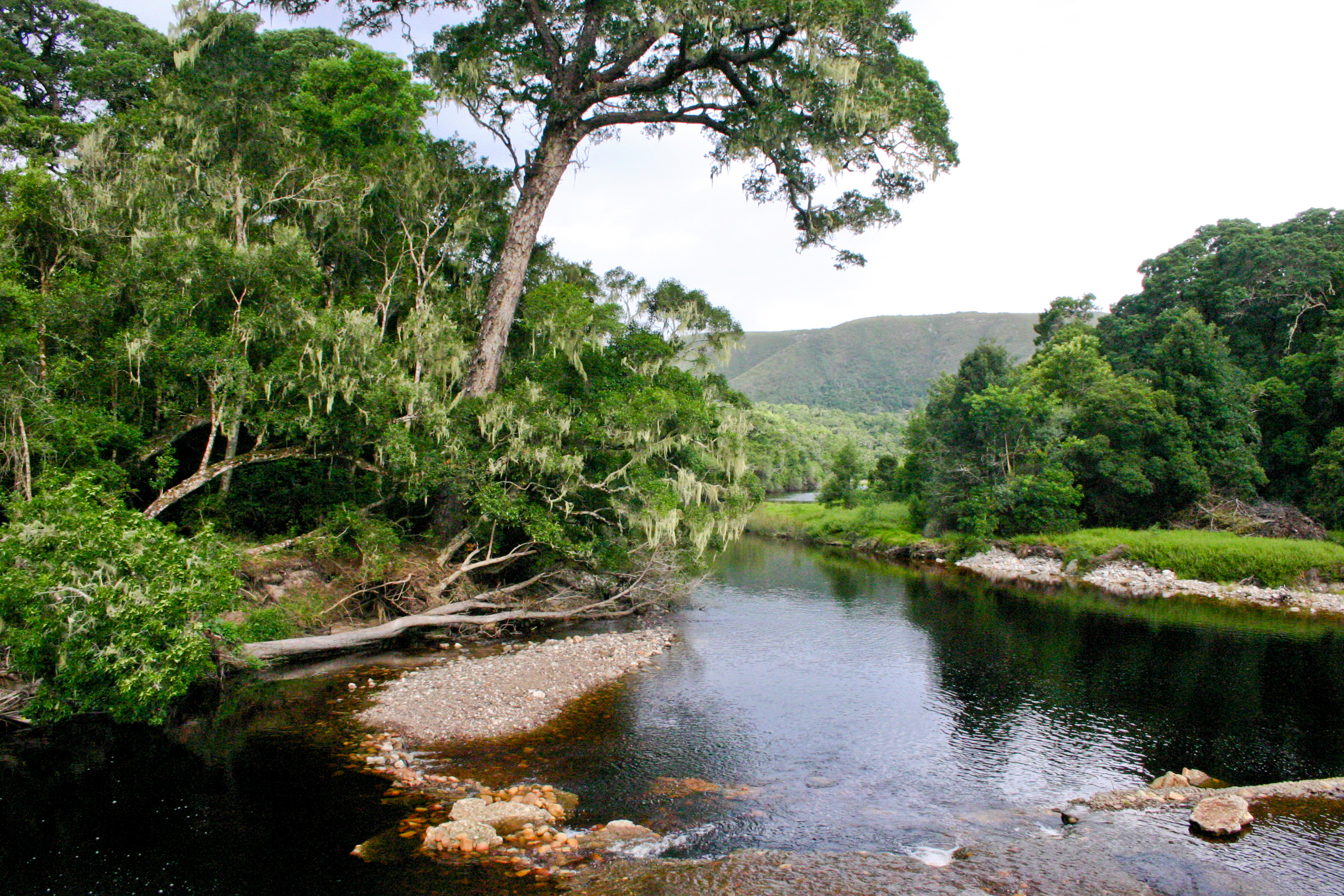
Grootrivier in Nature's Valley, stained a tea colour by plant tannins

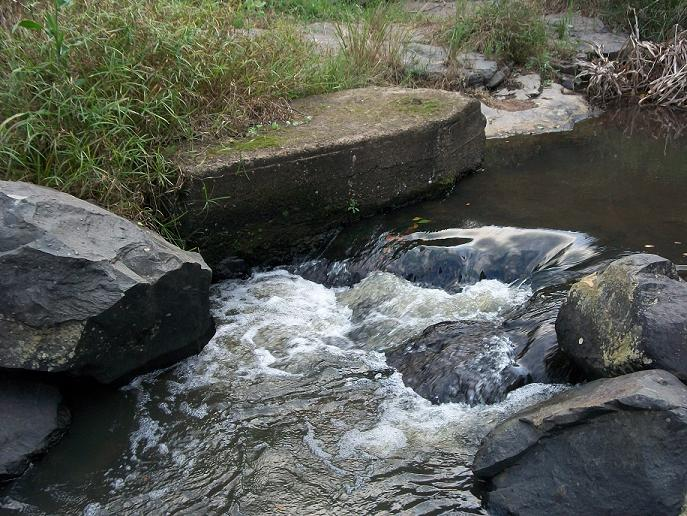
Amanzimtoti River at Ilanda Wilds

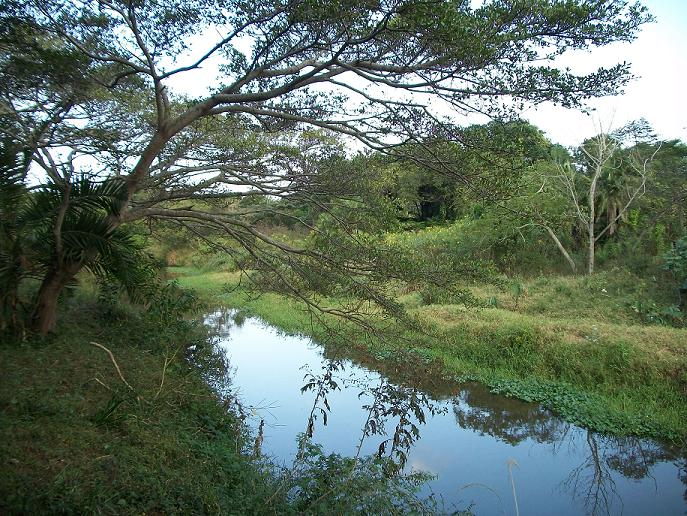
Amanzimtoti River at Ilanda Wilds

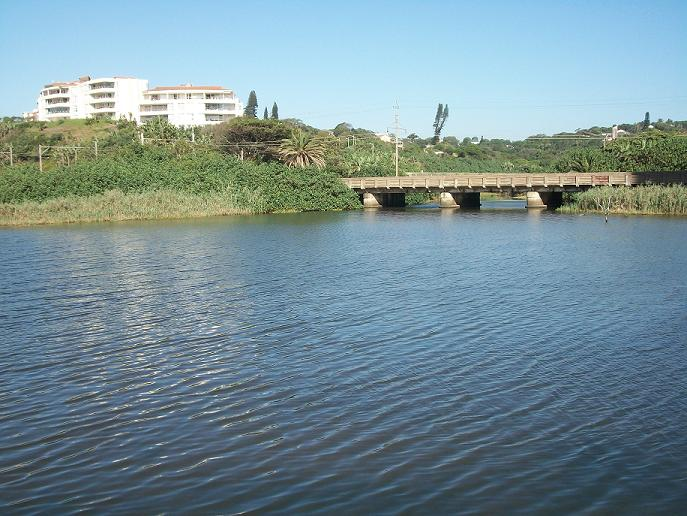
Amanzimtoti Lagoon

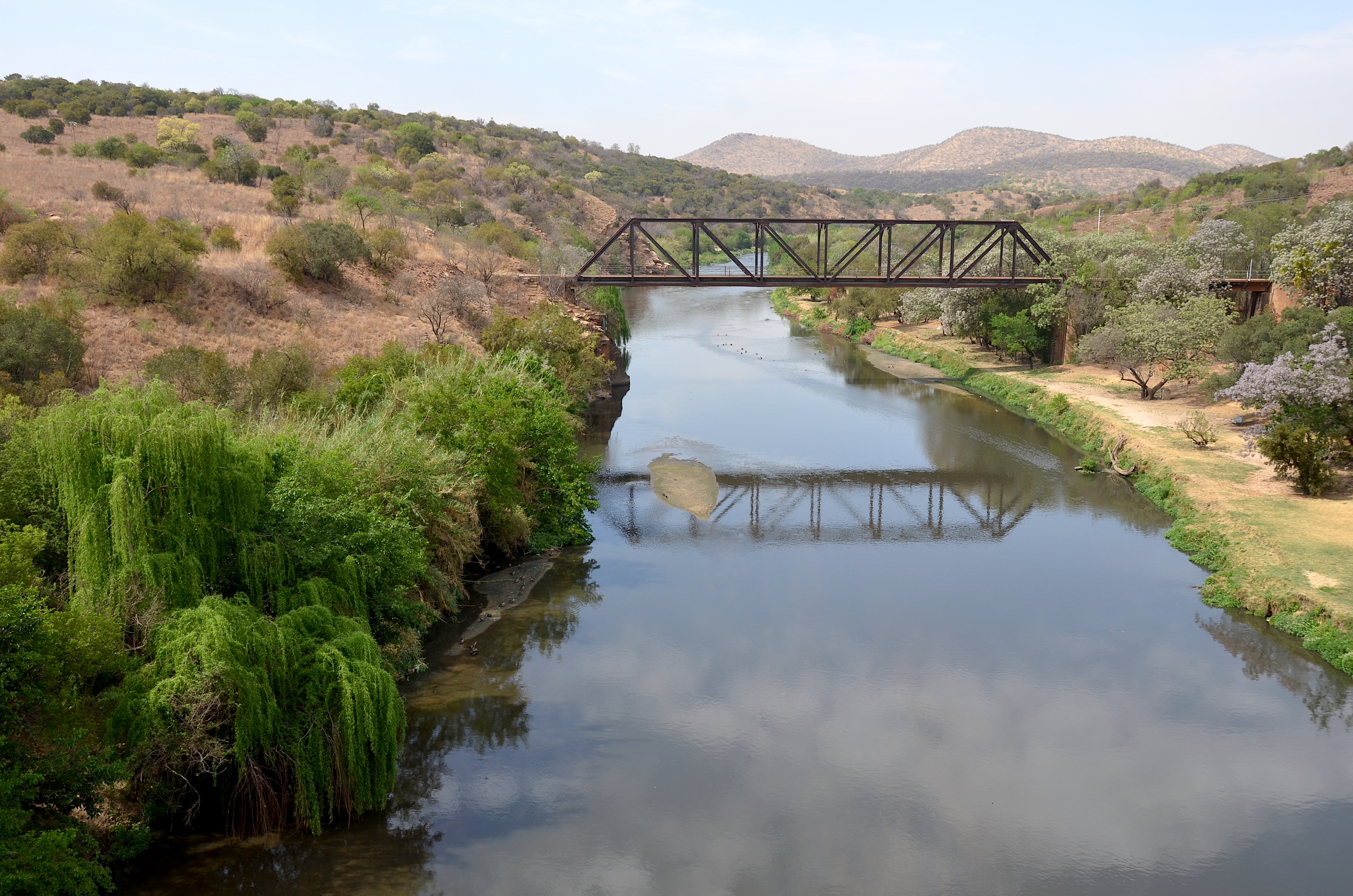
Crocodile River (Limpopo)

== See also ==
- List of reservoirs and dams in South Africa
- Water Management Areas
- Estuaries in South Africa
- List of lakes in South Africa
- Lagoons of South Africa
- List of Bays of South Africa
- Drainage basins of South Africa
