= Lekgalameetse Provincial Park =

Mountain wilderness in Limpopo, South Africa

- Location within Limpopo Location within South Africa
- Location: Limpopo, South Africa
- Nearest city: Tzaneen
- Coordinates: 24°08′48″S 30°12′01″E
- Area: 18,718 ha (46,250 acres)
- Governing body: Limpopo Tourism and Parks Board

Lekgalameetse Provincial Park is a conserved mountain wilderness of 18,718 ha in the northern Drakensberg of Limpopo Province, South Africa. The reserve entrance is 5 km by dirt road from Ofcolaco. Indigenous forest and mixed woodland occupy the valleys, while the mountain crests are covered in grassland. In the north the Park is contiguous with the Wolkberg Wilderness Area.

== Amenities and access ==
During the 1980s it was envisaged by the Lebowa government as a 25,000 ha reserve called The Downs Nature Reserve, which would cater recreational activities, camping and hiking. Since 2001 it is managed by the Limpopo Tourism and Parks Board. Current amenities include self-catering accommodation, a bush camp with log cabins beside a stream, farmhouses serving as guest houses, and a camp for school outings. It is situated west of Ofcolaco and Trichardtsdal, which are accessed from the R36 route. Four-wheel drive vehicles can also reach it via Orrie Baragwanath Pass, which traverses the Park from west to east.

== Climate and geography ==
Lekgalameetse means "the place of water" in the sePedi language of the Sekororo people, a tribe of the baPedi, as the area is intersected by many streams. It receives between 800 and 1,000 mm per annum, which falls mainly in summer, and mist is a regular occurrence. The western slopes are drained by tributaries of the Mohlapitse River which originates in the Wolkberg, and joins the Olifants River some kilometers to the south. The southeastern slopes of Mamotswiri Mountain (1,838 m), forming the northern perimeter and highest point, are drained by the Ngwabitsi River. The Ofcolaco road follows the course of the Ga-Selati River, while the reception office is located on the bank of the Makhutsi.

== Fauna and flora ==
Native mammals include bushbuck, common duiker, mountain reedbuck, klipspringer, samango monkey, chacma baboon, thick-tailed bushbaby and leopard. The area has a varied butterfly fauna. Since the mid 1980s the invasive and wind dispersed pompom weed has established itself here.

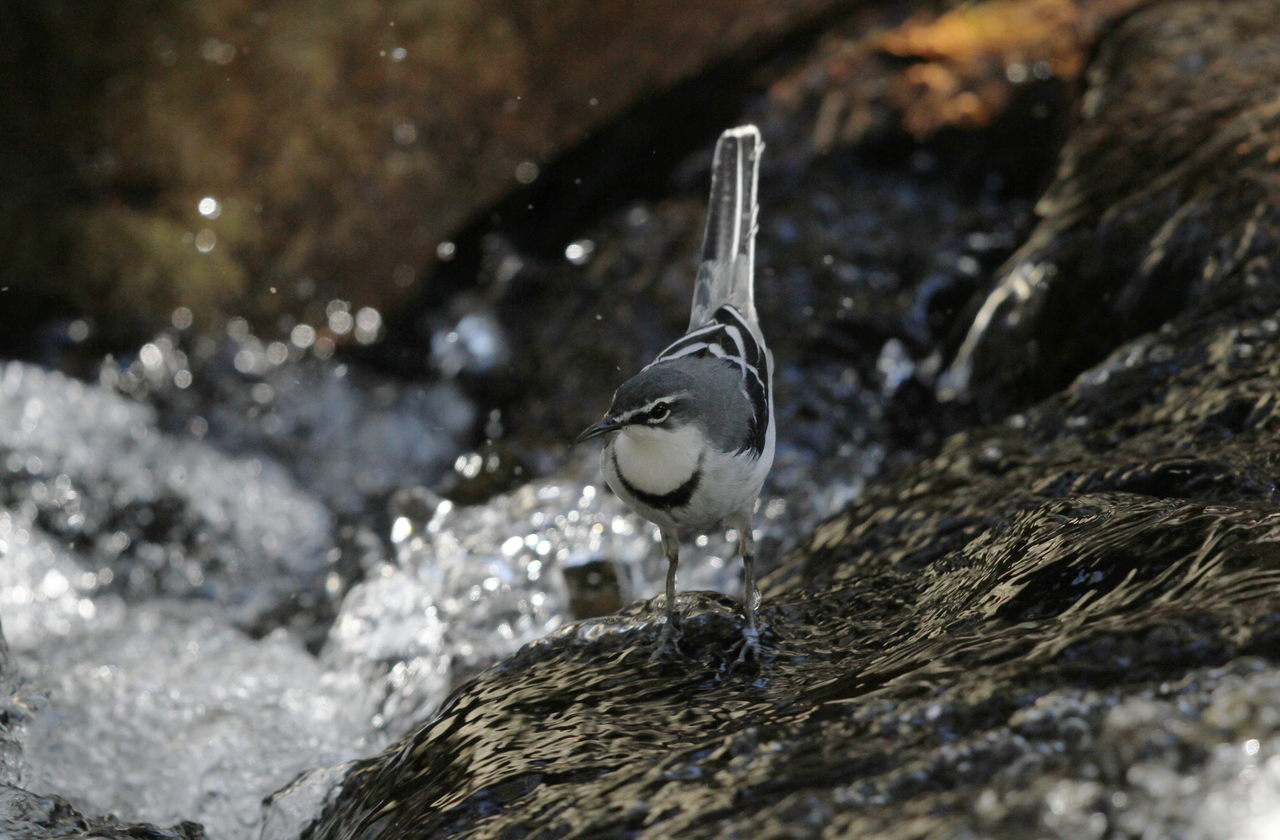
A mountain wagtail foraging along a clear mountain stream in Lekgalameetse

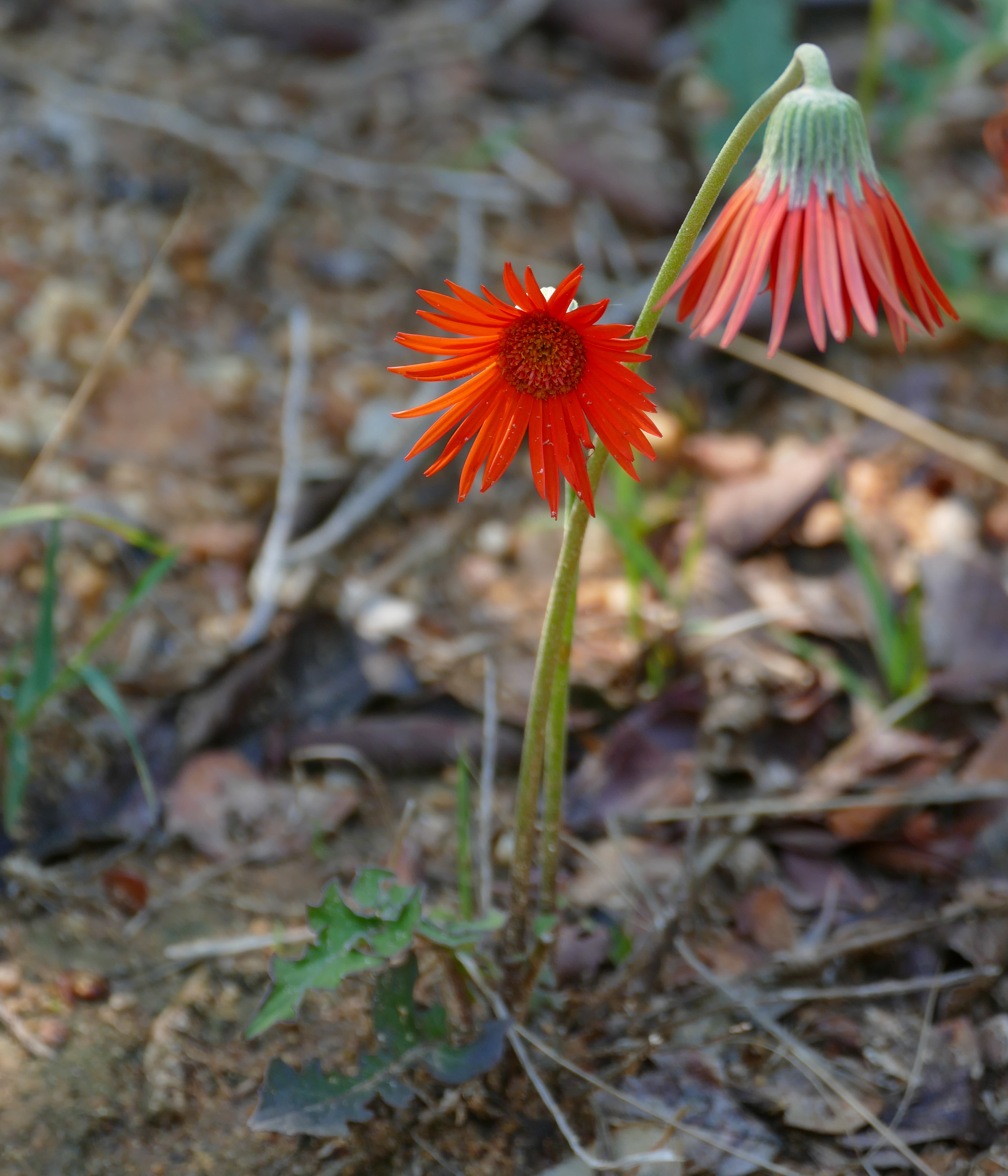
The shade-loving Barberton daisy in flower

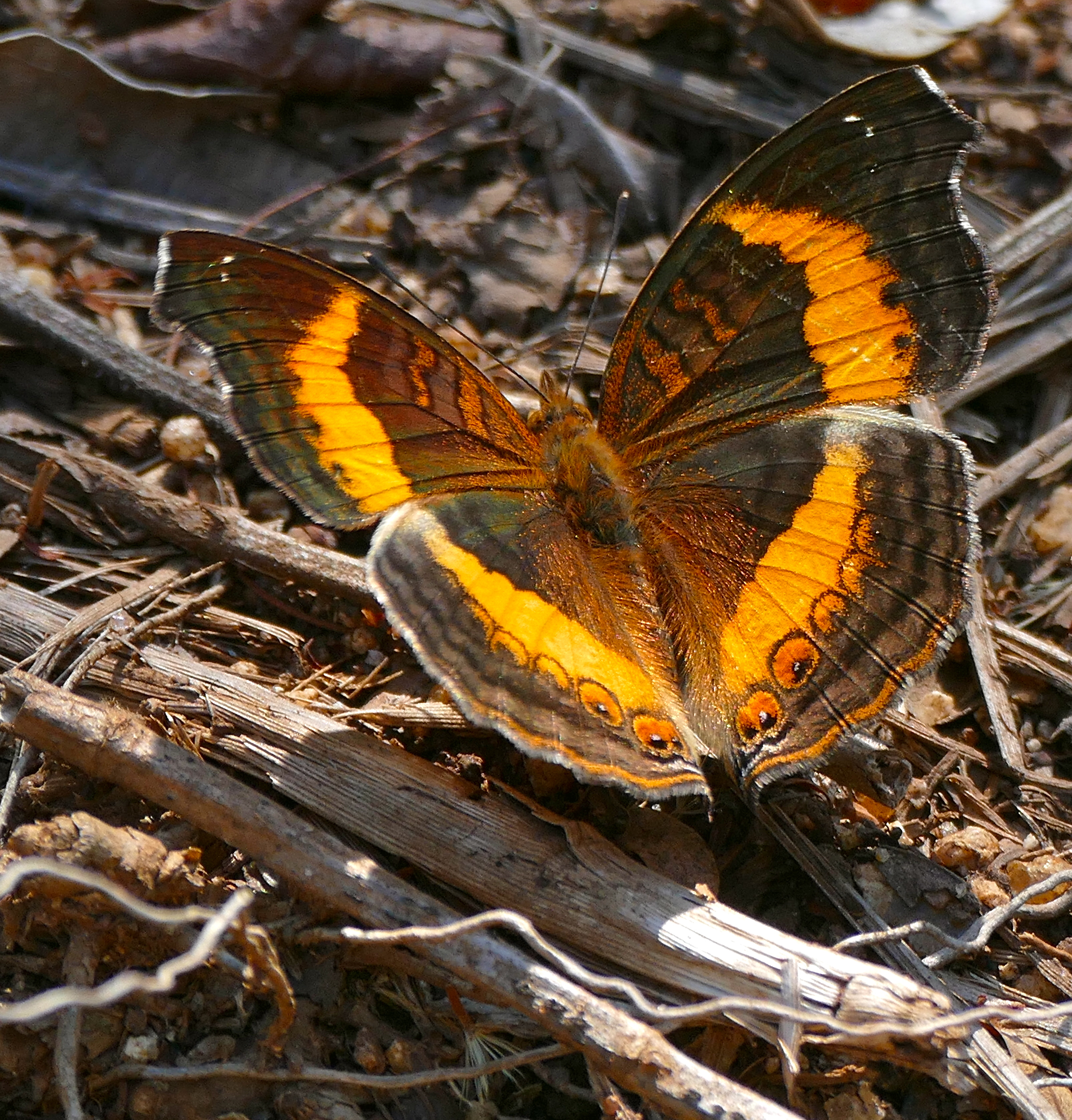
A soldier pansy resting on the woodland floor

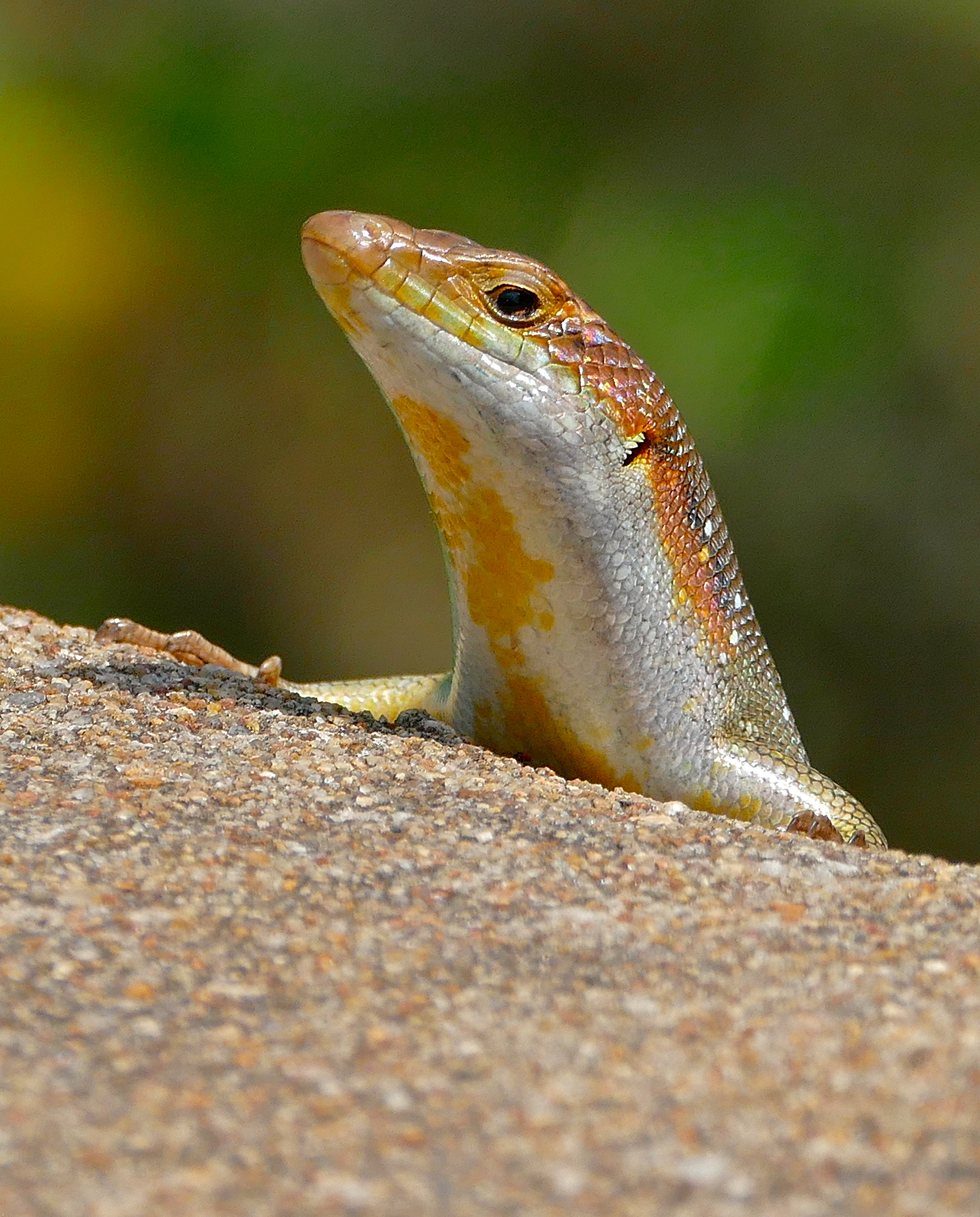
Male of the colourful rainbow skink

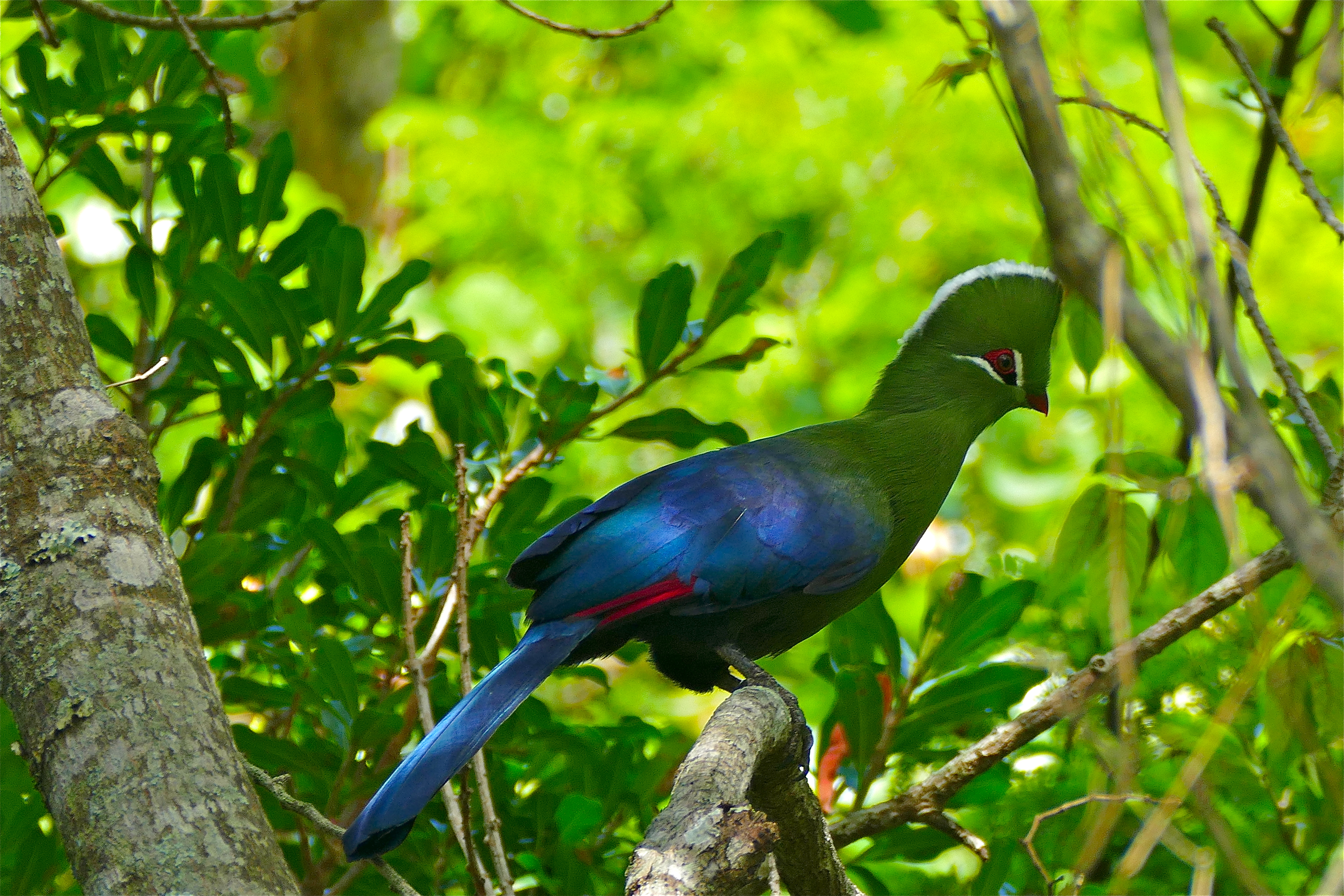
The frugivorous Knysna turaco visiting the canopy of a Cape beech tree
