= Disa aristata =

Scientific classification
- Kingdom: Plantae
- Clade: Tracheophytes
- Clade: Angiosperms
- Clade: Monocots
- Order: Asparagales
- Family: Orchidaceae
- Subfamily: Orchidoideae
- Genus: Disa
- Species: D. aristata

Binomial name
- Disa aristata H.P.Linder

Species of flowering plant

Disa aristata is a perennial plant and geophyte belonging to the genus Disa. The plant is endemic to Limpopo and occurs in the Wolkberg. It has an area of occurrence of less than 25 km^{2} (9.7 sq mi). The plant grows on mountain slopes and is surrounded by pine tree plantations. Although the pine trees are not planted on mountain slopes, the seeds spread to the slopes and become a threat to the plant.
