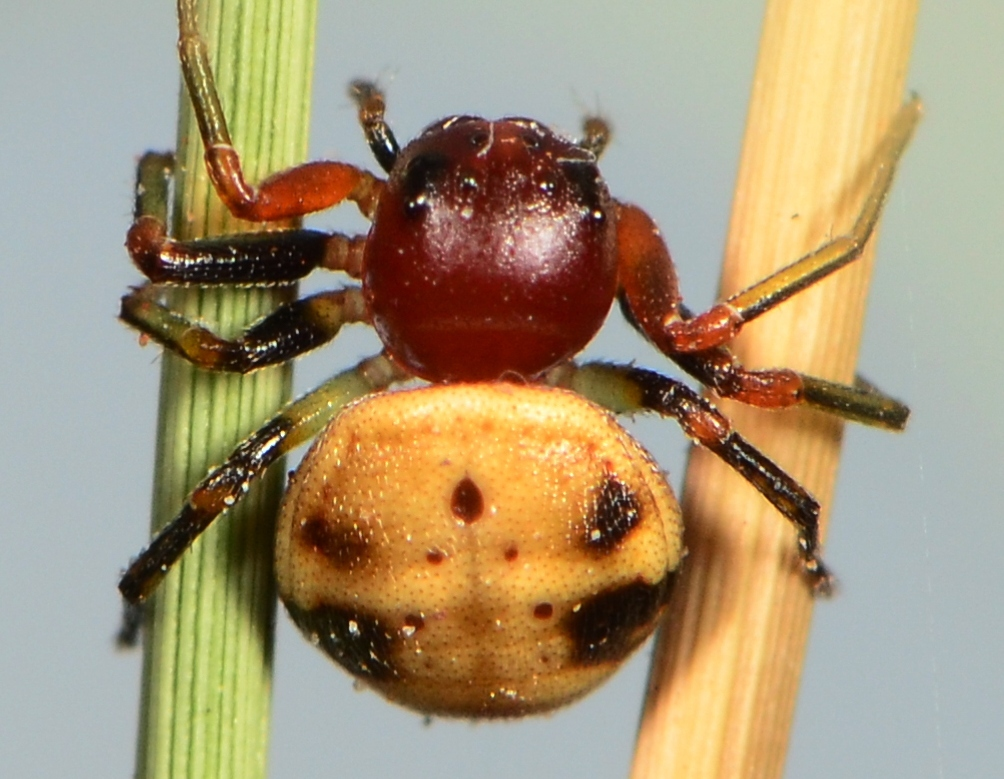
- female
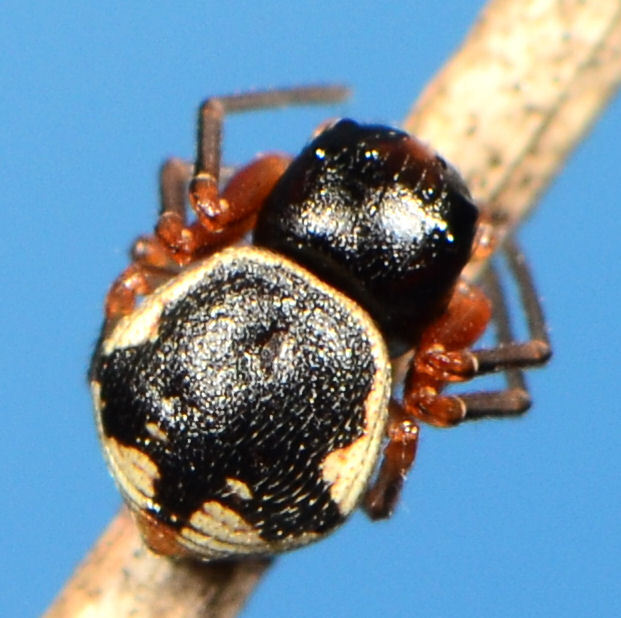
- female

Scientific classification
- Kingdom: Animalia
- Phylum: Arthropoda
- Subphylum: Chelicerata
- Class: Arachnida
- Order: Araneae
- Infraorder: Araneomorphae
- Family: Thomisidae
- Genus: Mystaria
- Species: M. savannensis

Binomial name
- Mystaria savannensis Lewis & Dippenaar-Schoeman, 2014

= Mystaria savannensis =

Striped-leg Beetle Crab Spider

Species of spider

Mystaria savannensis is a species of spider in the family Thomisidae. It is endemic to Africa and is commonly known as the striped-leg beetle crab spider.

== Distribution ==
Mystaria savannensis is found in Botswana, Zambia, Zimbabwe and South Africa.

In South Africa, the species has a wide distribution and is known from five provinces including more than 10 protected areas. Notable locations include Kruger National Park, Blouberg Nature Reserve, Wolkberg Wilderness Area, and Rustenburg Nature Reserve.

== Habitat and ecology ==
Mystaria savannensis is collected mostly from trees or sometimes shrubs by sweeping, beating or fogging.

The species has been sampled from the Savanna biome at altitudes ranging from 131 to 1,556 m.

Individuals have been observed frequently hanging on their own silk thread when disturbed from a branch or twig. The species prefers living on indigenous tree species such as Sclerocarya birrea, Spirostachys africana, Kirkia acuminate, K. wilmsii and Pterocarpus rotundifolius.

Adults occur from October until July, while juveniles occur from October until February.

== Gallery ==
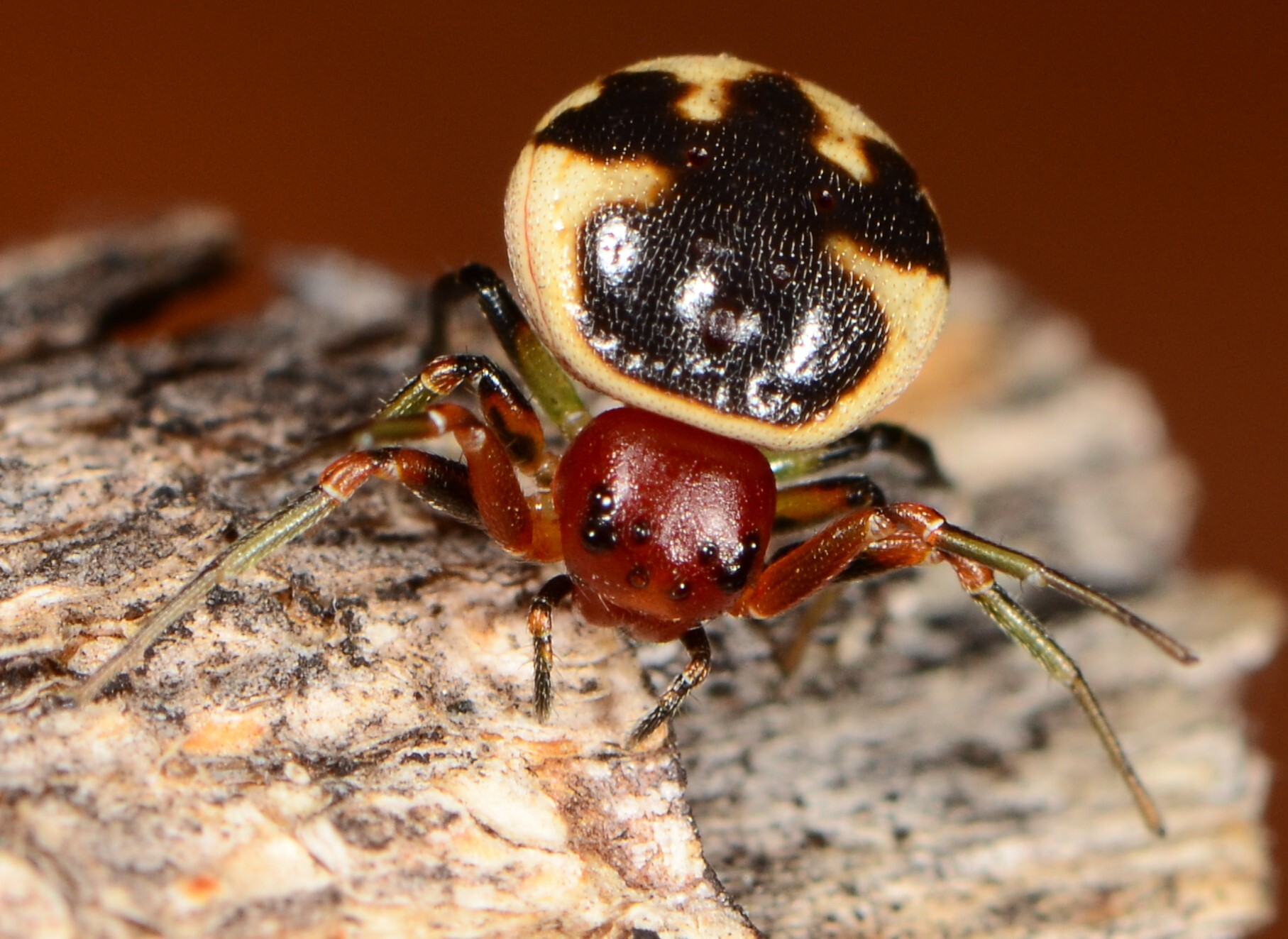
female

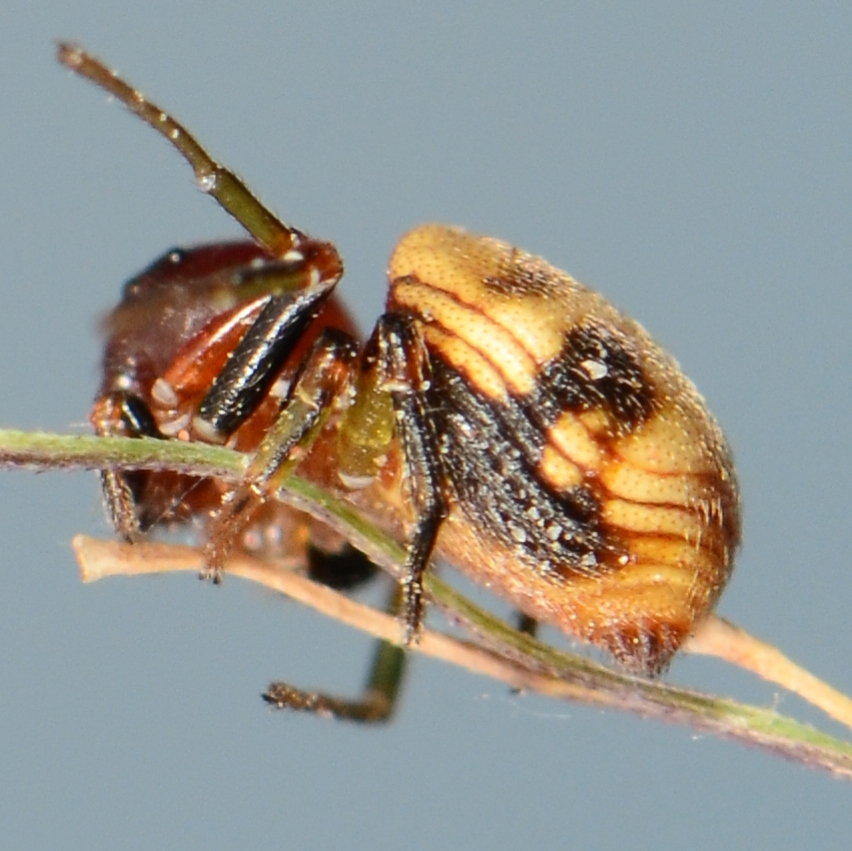
female

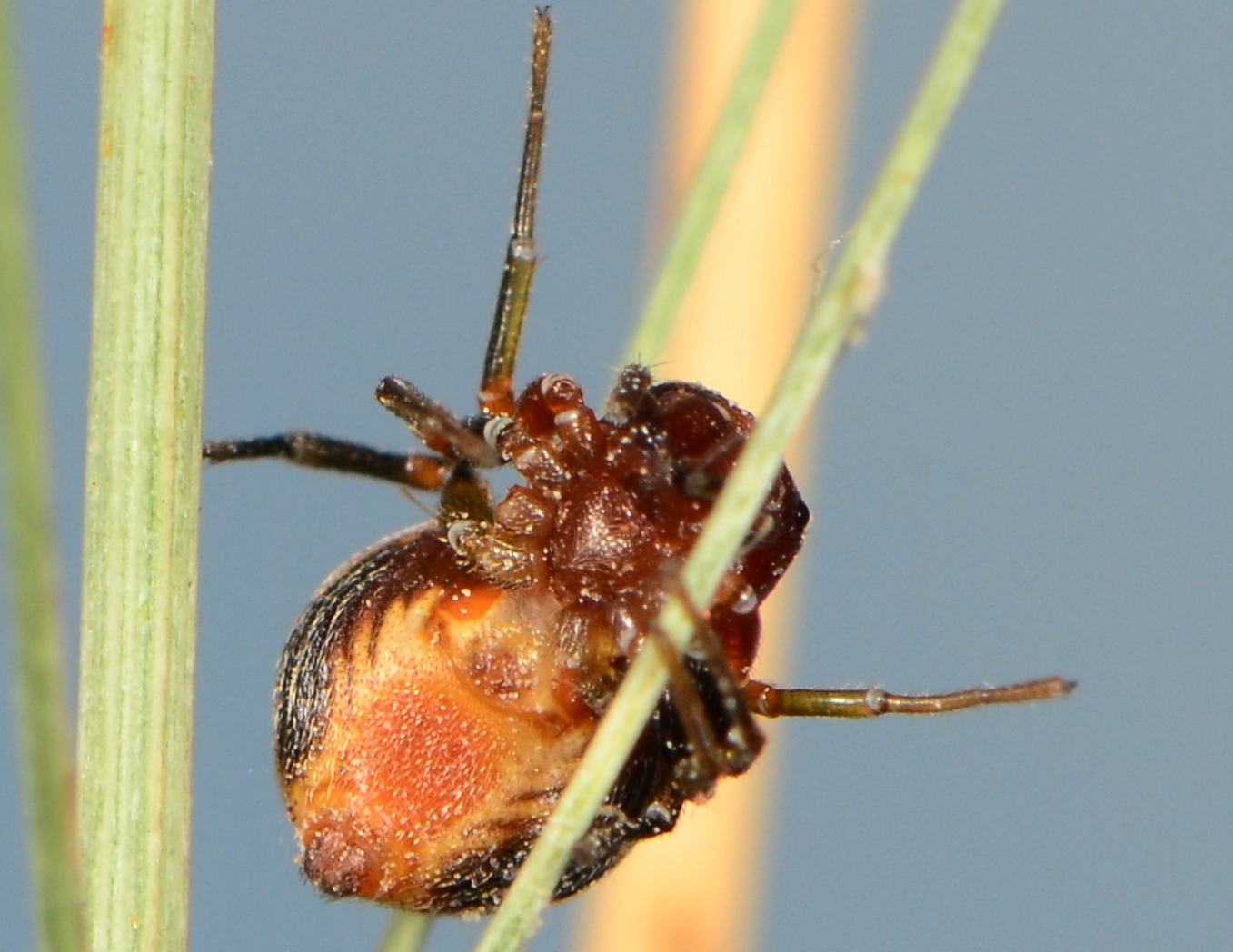
female

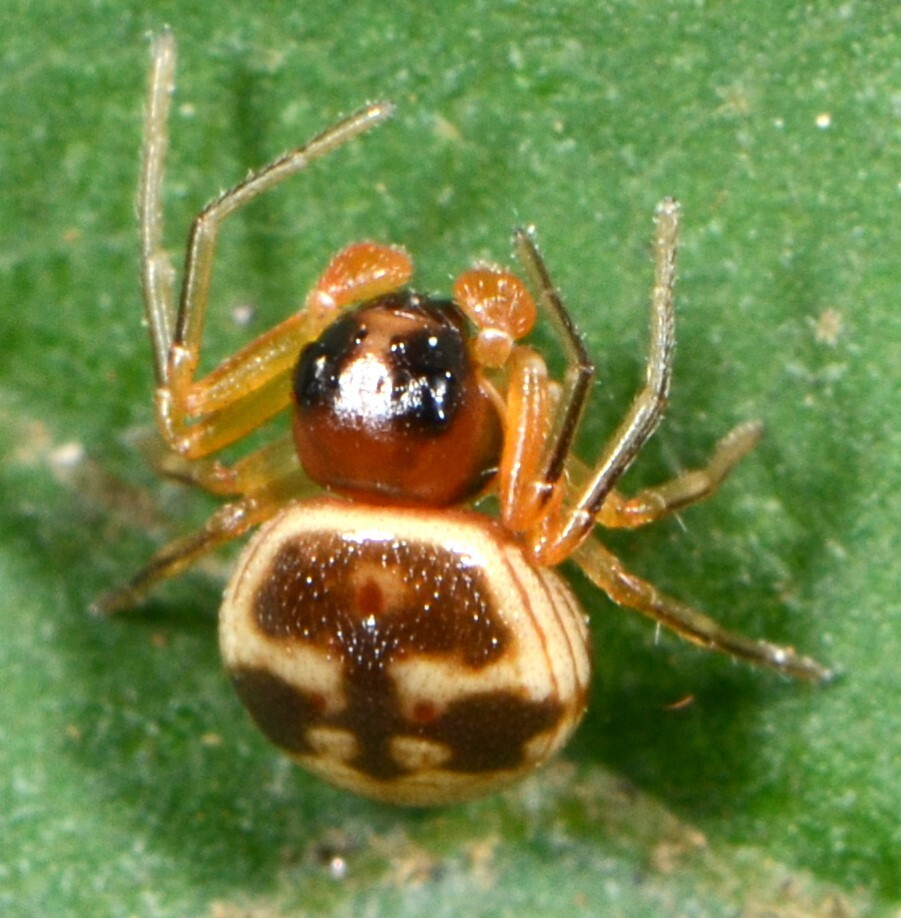
juvenile male

== Conservation ==
Mystaria savannensis is listed as Least Concern by the South African National Biodiversity Institute due to its wide geographical range. The species is protected in more than 10 reserves.
