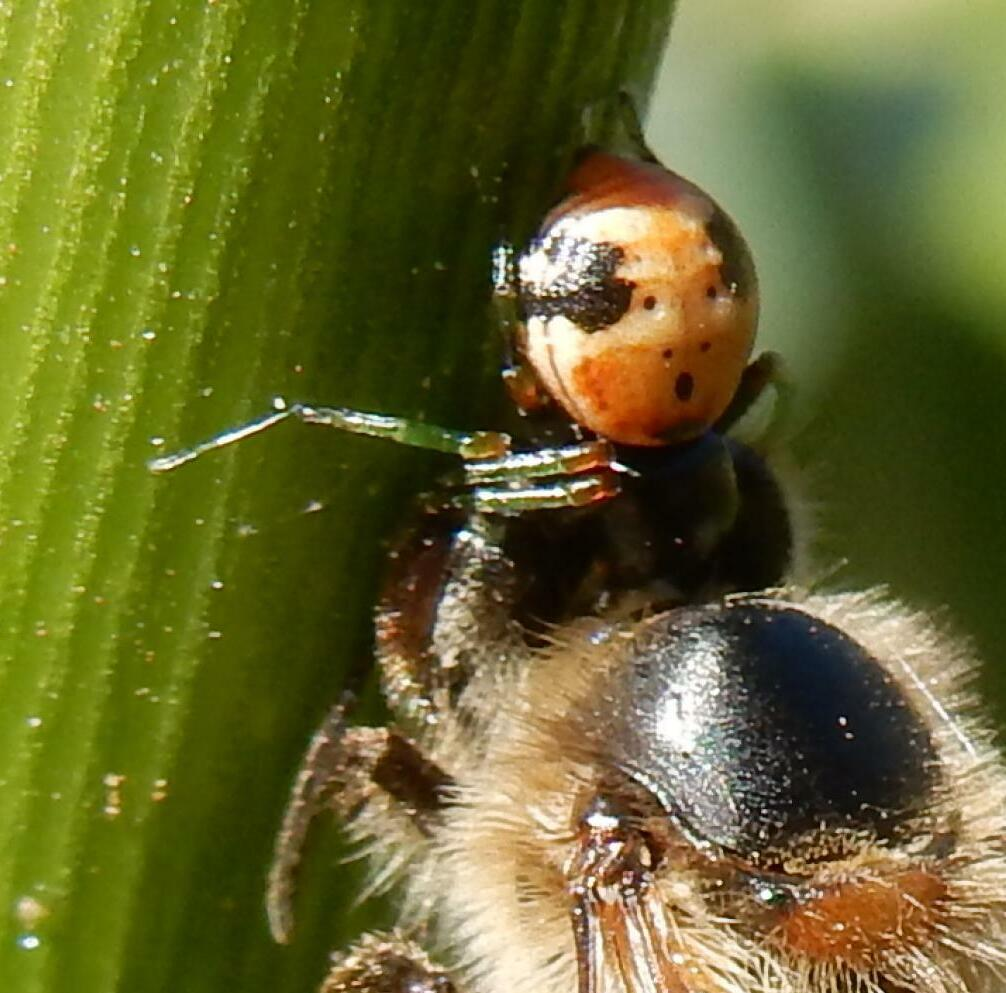

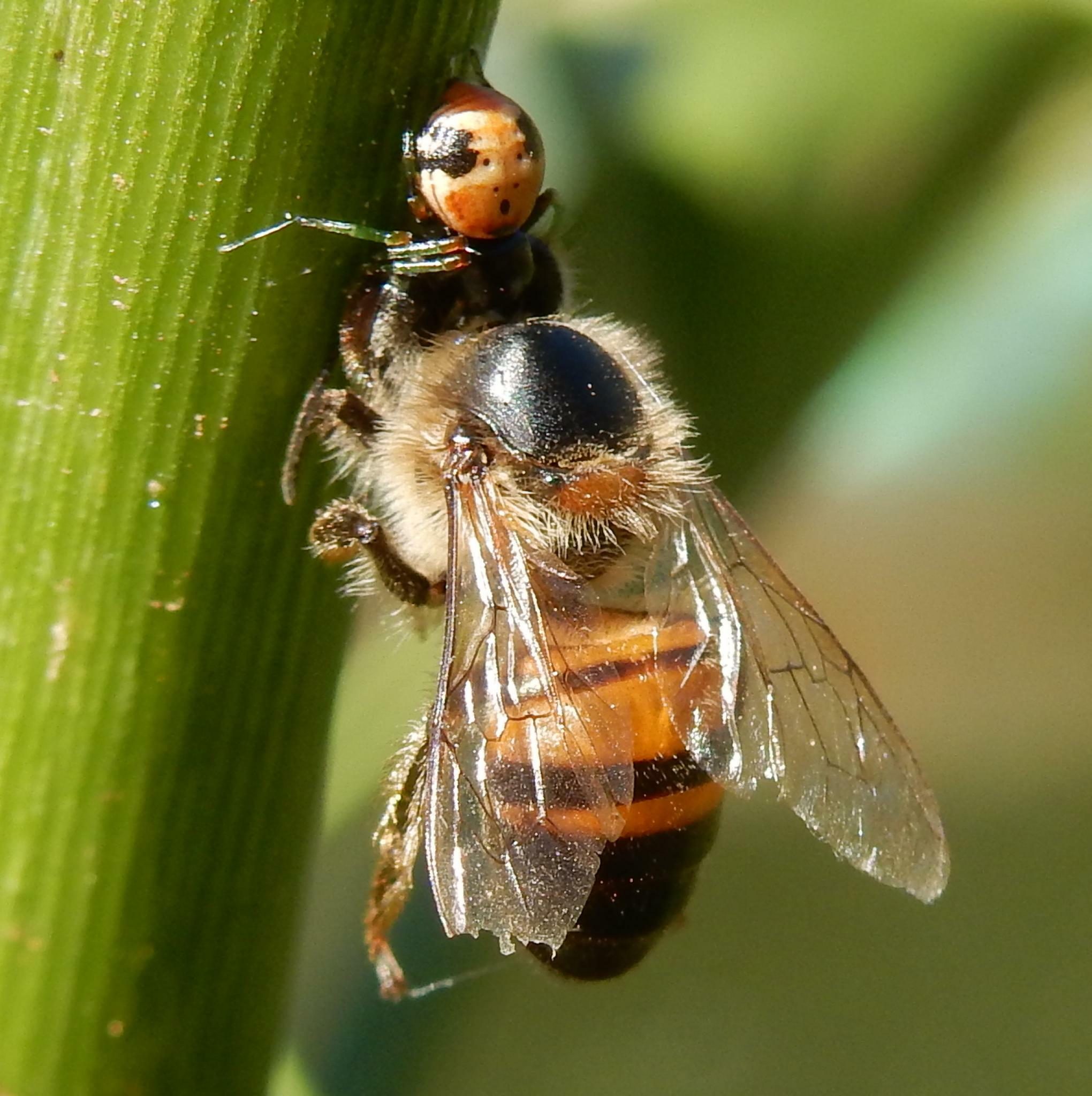
- with bee prey

Scientific classification
- Kingdom: Animalia
- Phylum: Arthropoda
- Subphylum: Chelicerata
- Class: Arachnida
- Order: Araneae
- Infraorder: Araneomorphae
- Family: Thomisidae
- Genus: Mystaria
- Species: M. irmatrix

Binomial name
- Mystaria irmatrix Lewis & Dippenaar-Schoeman, 2014

= Mystaria irmatrix =

Irma's Beetle Crab Spider

Species of spider

Mystaria irmatrix is a species of spider in the family Thomisidae. It is endemic to southern Africa and is commonly known as Irma's beetle crab spider.

== Distribution ==
Mystaria irmatrix is found in Mozambique and South Africa.

In South Africa, the species has been sampled from two provinces. Notable locations include Mkhambathi Nature Reserve, Mkuze Game Reserve, Tembe Elephant Park and Phinda Game Reserve.

== Habitat and ecology ==
Mystaria irmatrix is sampled from riverine, sand dune and coastal forest as well as woodlands and grasslands. The species has been collected from trees such as Terminalia sericea and Acacia sieberiana from Forest, Grassland, Savanna and Thicket biomes at altitudes ranging from 56 to 91 m.

Most adults were sampled between September and March, while juveniles were sampled in December.

== Conservation ==
Mystaria irmatrix is listed as Least Concern by the South African National Biodiversity Institute due to its wide geographical range.The species is protected in four reserves including Mkhambathi Nature Reserve, Mkuze Game Reserve, Phinda Game Reserve and Tembe Elephant Park.
