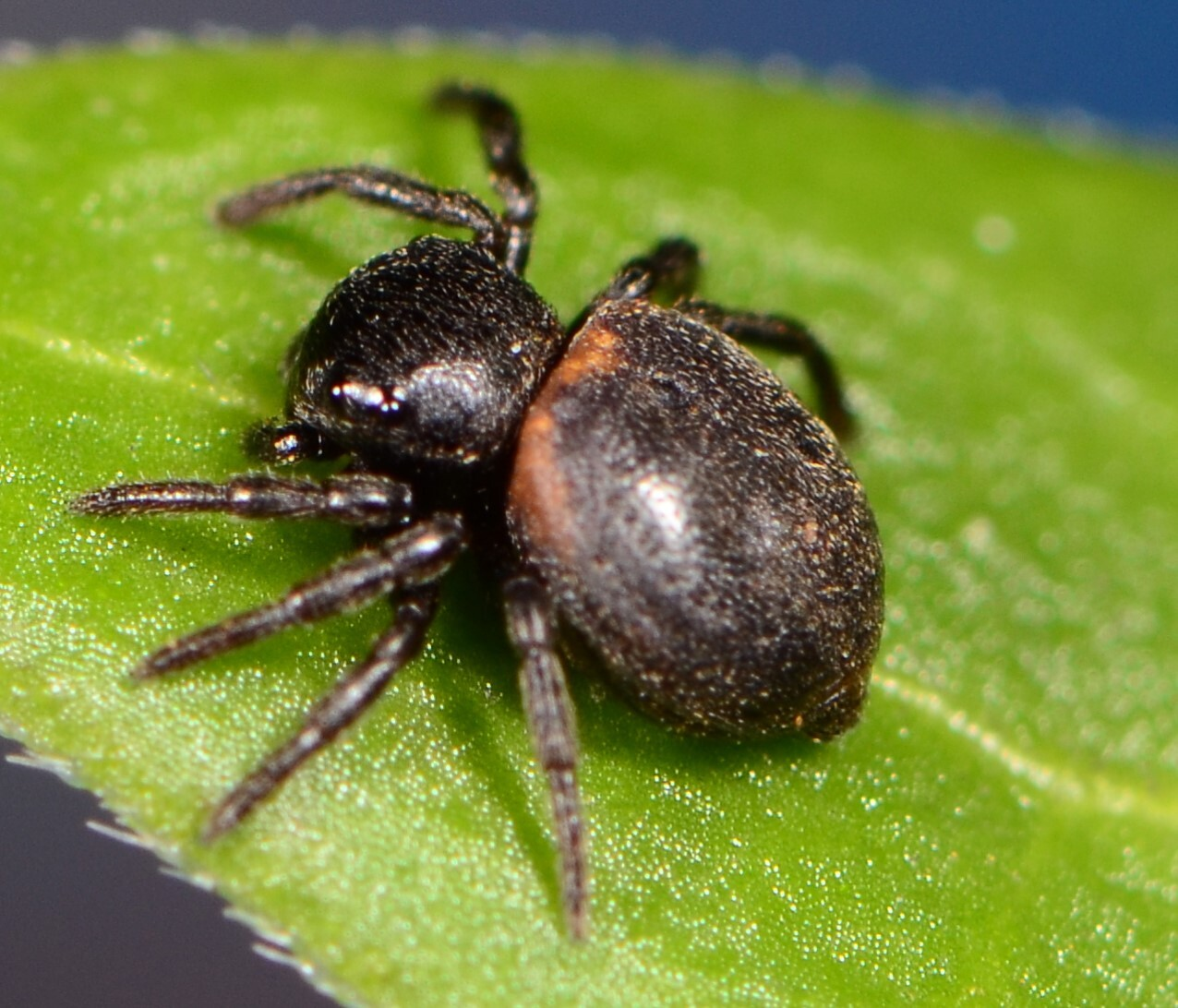
- female M. rufolimbata
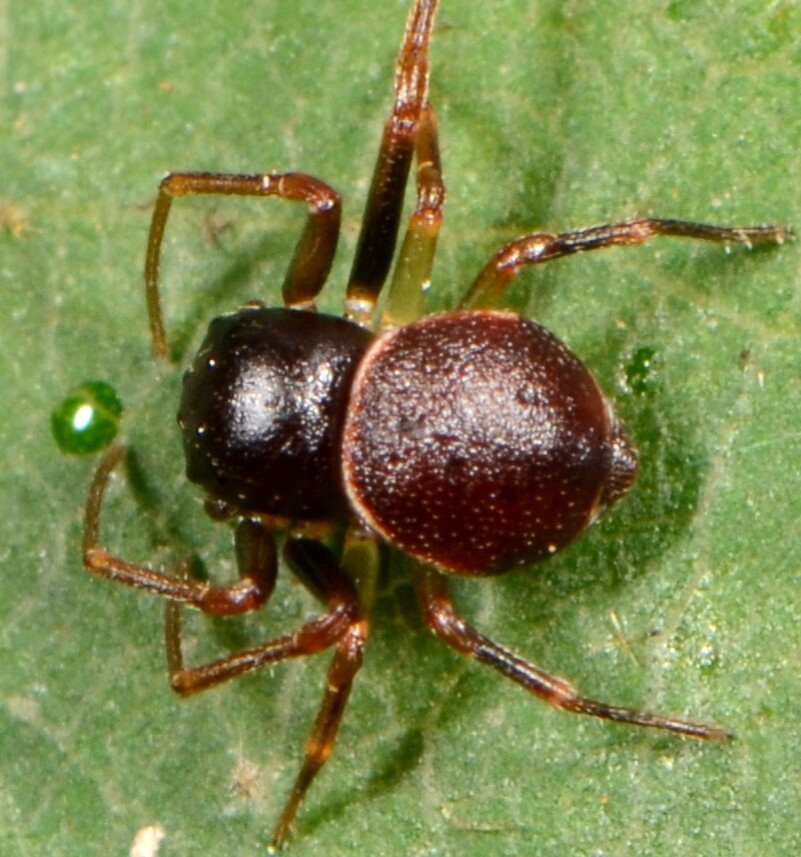
- male M. flavoguttata

Scientific classification
- Kingdom: Animalia
- Phylum: Arthropoda
- Subphylum: Chelicerata
- Class: Arachnida
- Order: Araneae
- Infraorder: Araneomorphae
- Family: Thomisidae
- Genus: Mystaria; Simon, 1895

Type species
- M. rufolimbata Simon, 1895

Species
- 14, see text

Synonyms
- Paramystaria

= Mystaria (spider) =

Genus of spiders

Mystaria is a genus of African crab spiders first described by Eugène Simon in 1895.

== Description ==
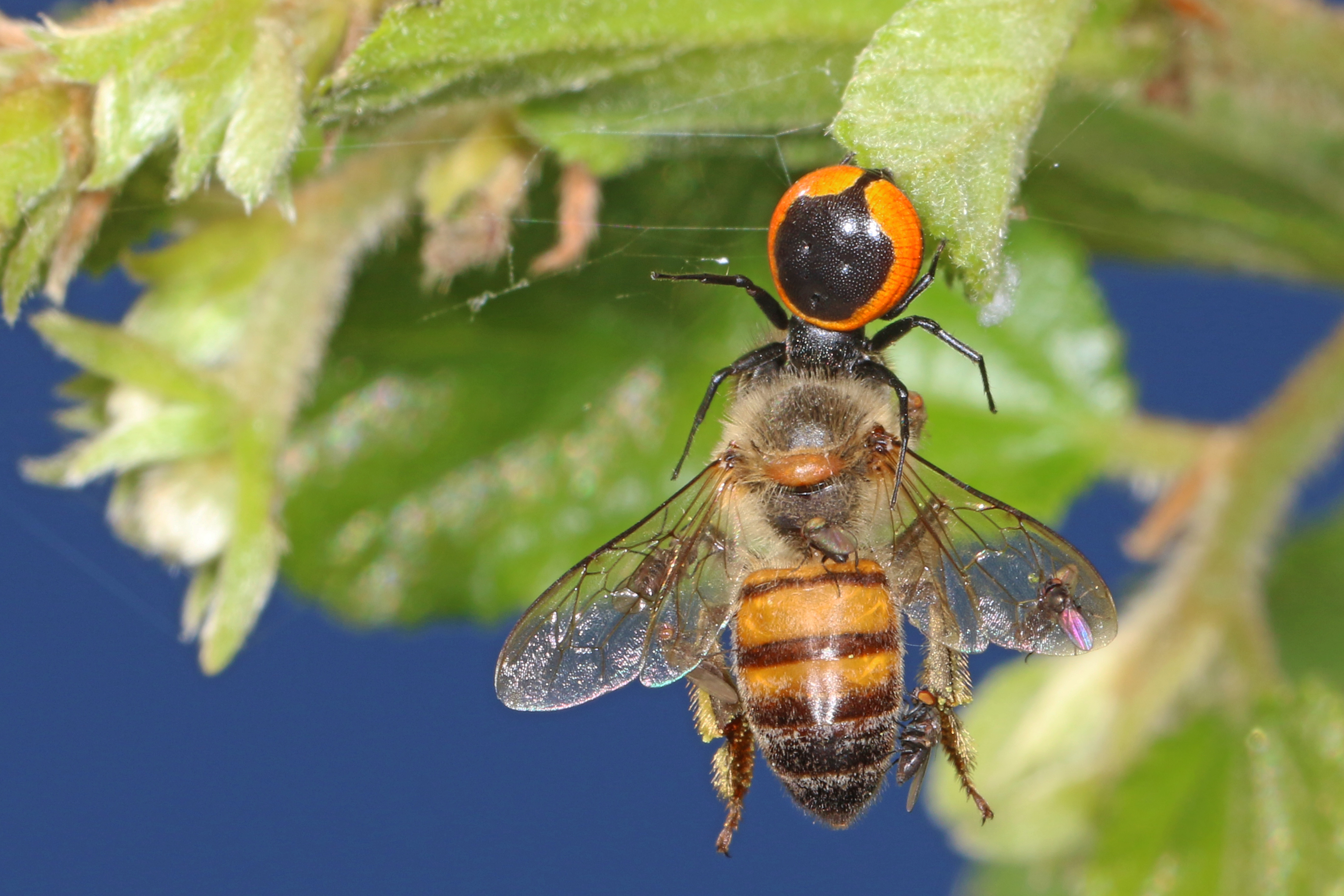
Mystaria sp. with bee

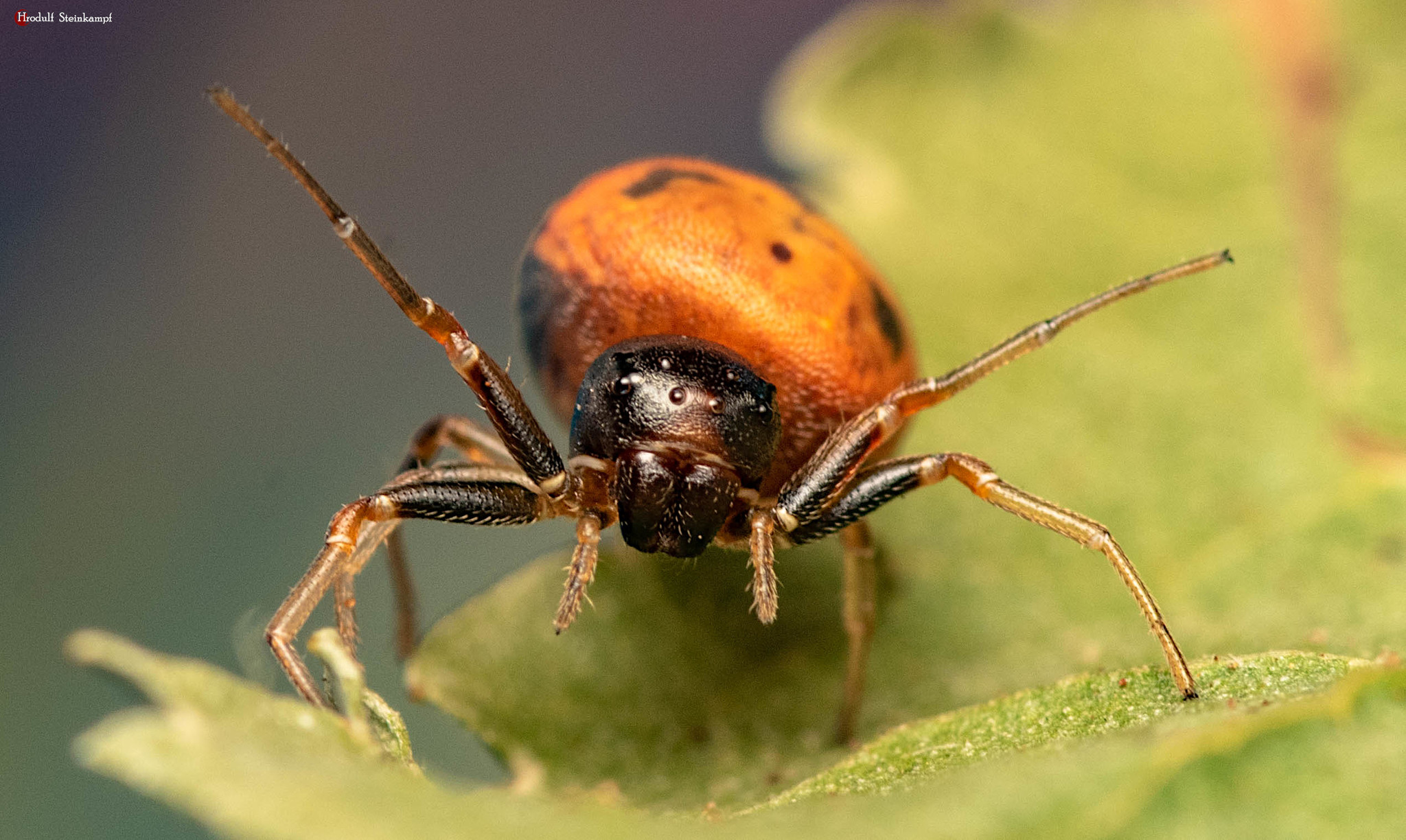
M. mnyama

The total length of females is 4-5 mm, while males measure 2-3 mm. The body and legs of these small spiders may be decorated with yellow, red, black or brown patterns, but the colour fades in alcohol.

The carapace is circular to cube-shaped. The cephalic and thoracic region is elevated. The eyes are arranged in two rows. The median eyes are smaller than the lateral eyes. The median ocular quadrangle is narrower anteriorly than posteriorly. The abdomen is circular to oval. In females, the abdomen is large in relation to the carapace.

The legs are either pale or have brown or black tinted parts, or are similar to the female's legs with infuscated bands or longitudinal dorsal lines. Males resemble females but are smaller in size and differ as follows: the body is usually a uniform dark colour, although in some species it may be shades of brown, orange or copper-red with yellow, orange to copper-red patterns, or tinted black.

== Taxonomy ==
The genus was revised by Lewis and Dippenaar-Schoeman in 2014.

== Species ==
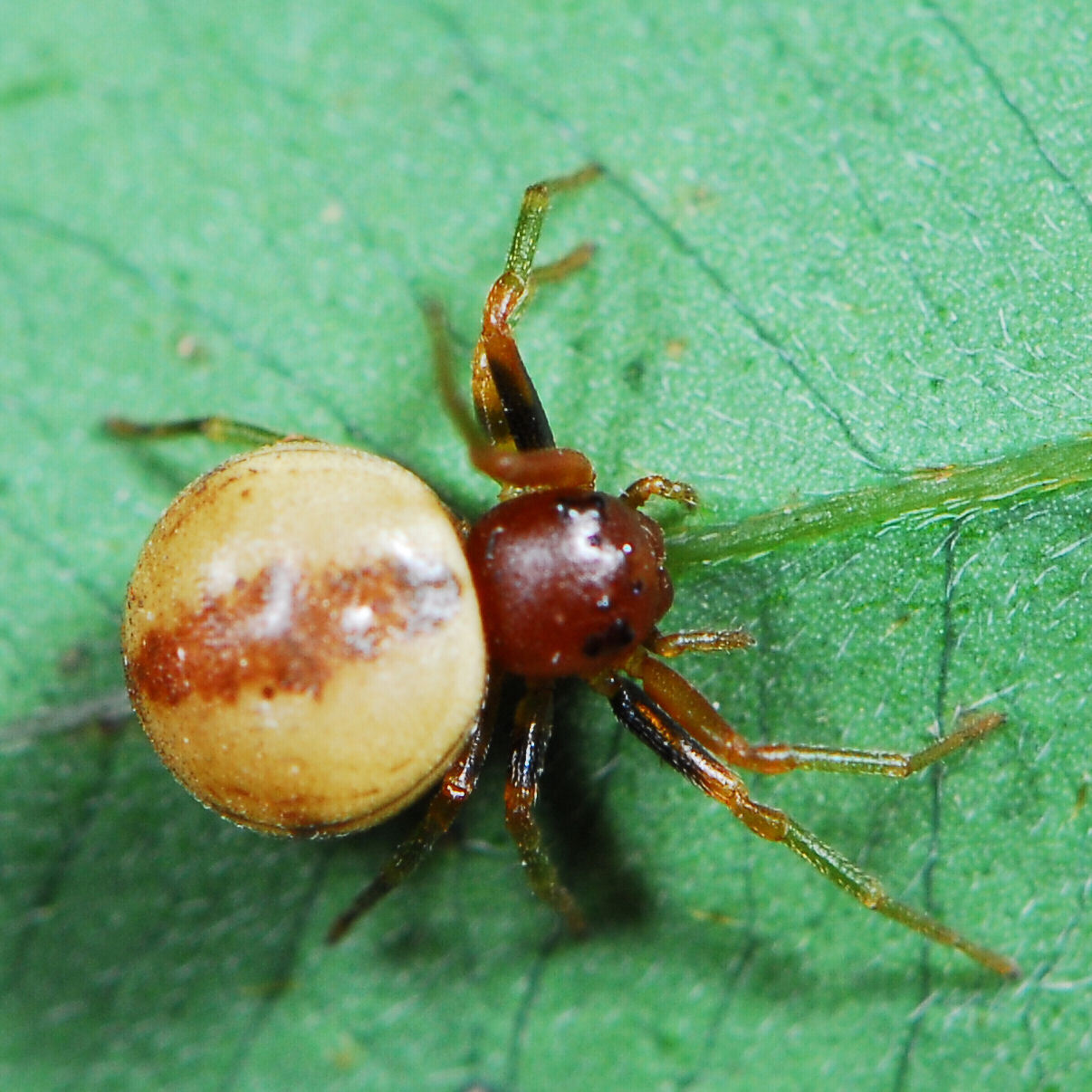
female M. flavoguttata

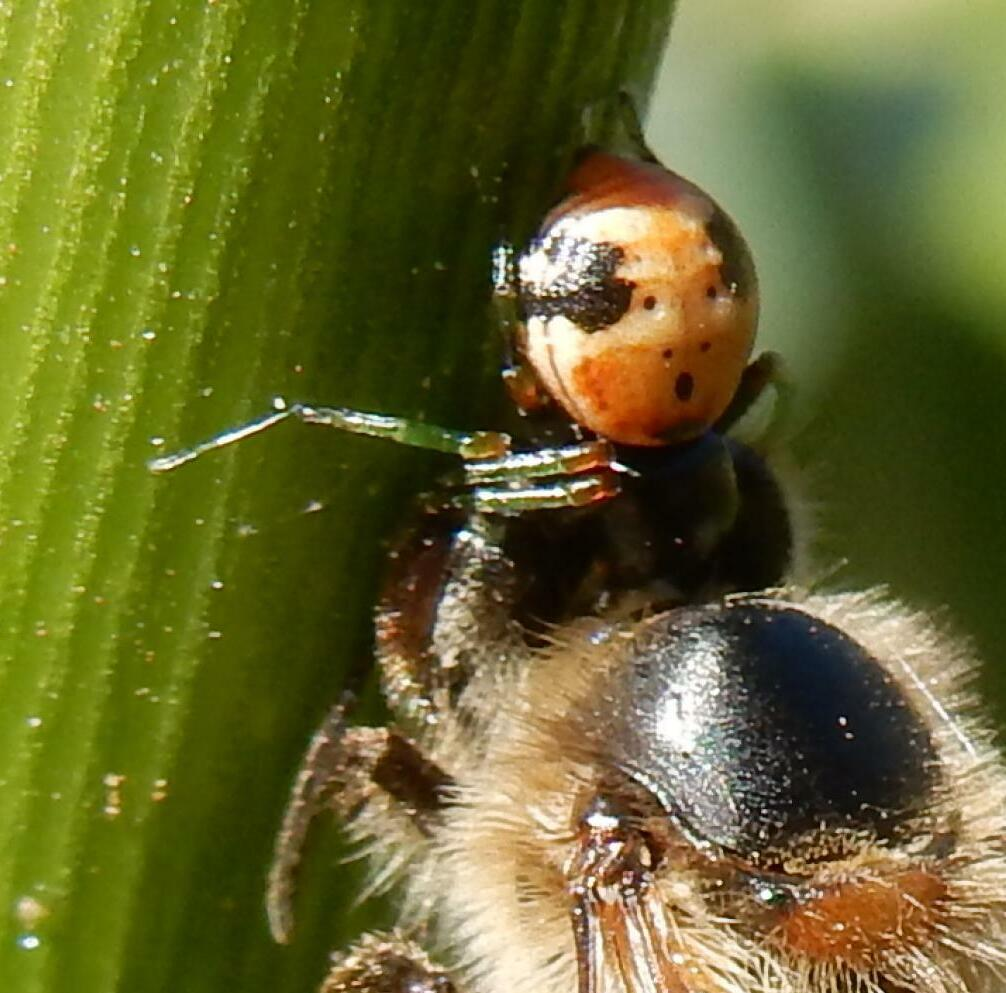
M. irmatrix

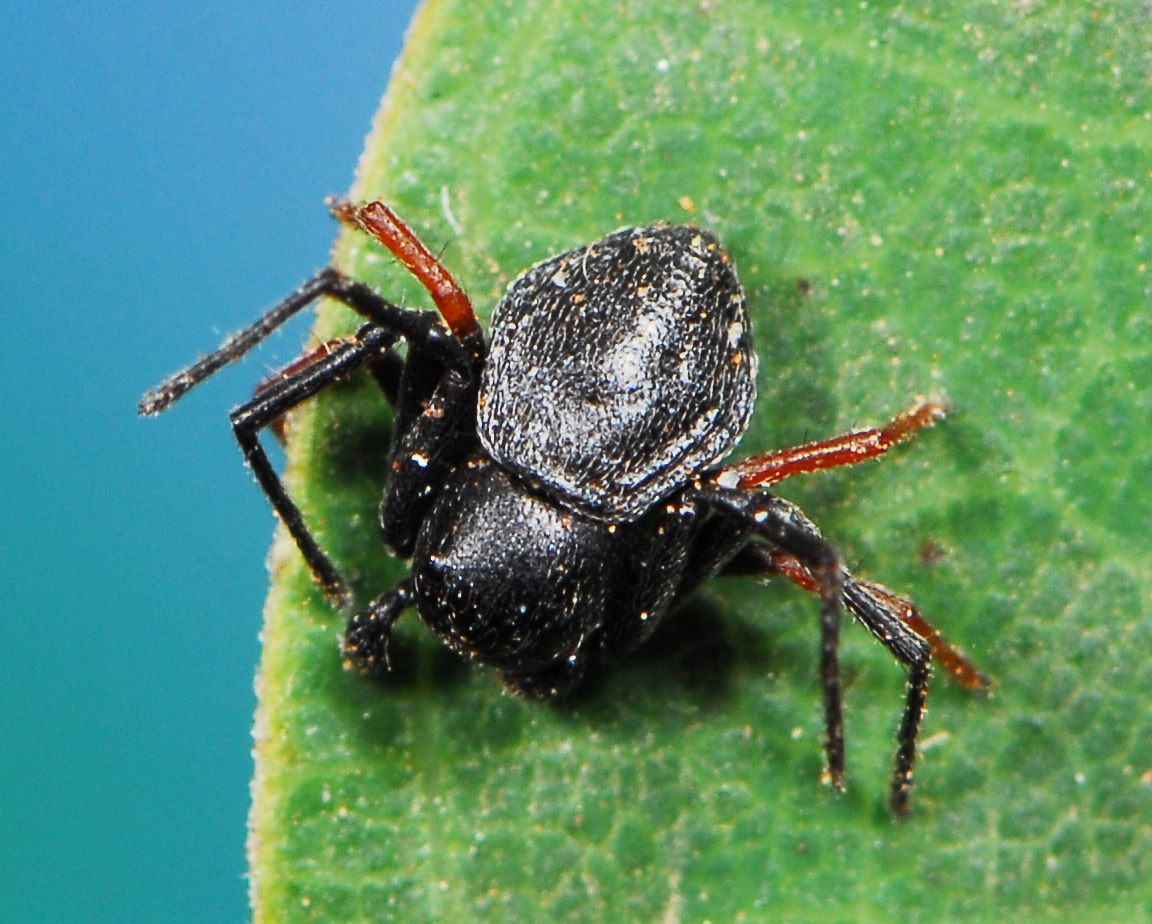
male M. rufolimbata

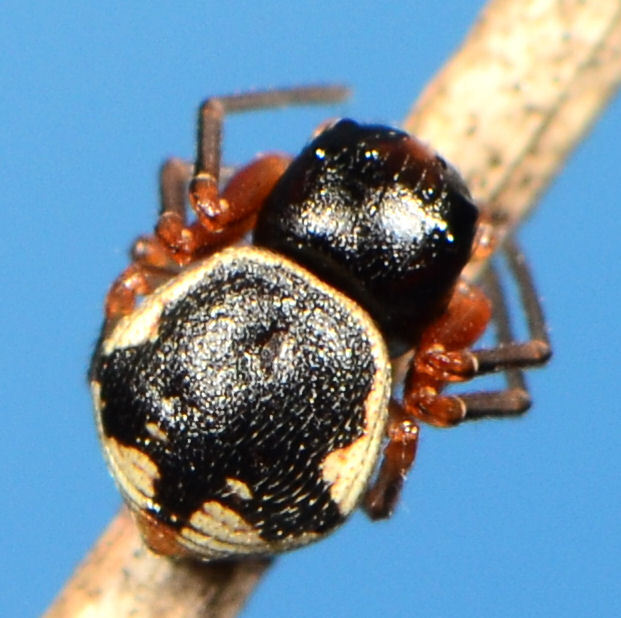
female M. savannensis

As of October 2025, this genus includes fourteen species and one subspecies:

- Mystaria budongo Lewis & Dippenaar-Schoeman, 2014 – DR Congo, Kenya, Rwanda, Uganda
- Mystaria decorata (Lessert, 1919) – East Africa
- Mystaria flavoguttata (Lawrence, 1952) – DR Congo, South Africa, Eswatini
- Mystaria irmatrix Lewis & Dippenaar-Schoeman, 2014 – Mozambique, South Africa
- Mystaria lata (Lawrence, 1927) – Namibia, South Africa
- Mystaria lindaicapensis Lewis & Dippenaar-Schoeman, 2014 – South Africa
- Mystaria mnyama Lewis & Dippenaar-Schoeman, 2014 – South Africa
- Mystaria occidentalis (Millot, 1942) – Guinea, Cameroon, Congo, Uganda, Rwanda, Tanzania, Mozambique, South Africa
- Mystaria oreadae Lewis & Dippenaar-Schoeman, 2014 – Rwanda, Congo
- Mystaria rufolimbata Simon, 1895 – Sierra Leone, Ivory Coast, Cameroon, Congo, Gabon, DR Congo, Mozambique, South Africa (type species)
- Mystaria savannensis Lewis & Dippenaar-Schoeman, 2014 – Zambia, Botswana, Zimbabwe, South Africa
- Mystaria soleil Lewis & Dippenaar-Schoeman, 2014 – Uganda, Kenya
- Mystaria stakesbyi Lewis & Dippenaar-Schoeman, 2014 – DR Congo, Liberia, Gabon, Ghana, Kenya, Rwanda, Tanzania, Uganda
- Mystaria variabilis (Lessert, 1919) – Ethiopia, DR Congo, Uganda, Kenya, Rwanda, Tanzania, Malawi, Mozambique, South Africa
  - M. v. delesserti (Caporiacco, 1949) – Kenya
