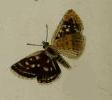

Scientific classification
- Domain: Eukaryota
- Kingdom: Animalia
- Phylum: Arthropoda
- Class: Insecta
- Order: Lepidoptera
- Family: Hesperiidae
- Genus: Spialia
- Species: S. secessus

Binomial name
- Spialia secessus (Trimen, 1891)

Synonyms
- Pyrgus secessus Trimen, 1891; Hesperia secessus f. trimeni Aurivillius, 1925; Syrichtus secessus

= Spialia secessus =

Wolkberg sandman

Species of butterfly

Spialia secessus, the Wolkberg sandman, is a butterfly of the family Hesperiidae. It is found in high savannah and montane grasslands from Eswatini to northern KwaZulu-Natal, the eastern part of the Limpopo Province and Mpumalanga. It is also present in Zimbabwe. It is named after the Wolkberg range.

The wingspan is 27–31 mm for males and 30–32 mm for females. Adults are on wing from July to March with peaks from September to November for the wet-season form and in February for the dry-season form. There are several generations per year.
