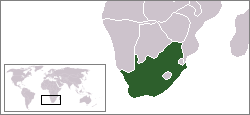

Scientific classification
- Kingdom: Animalia
- Phylum: Arthropoda
- Subphylum: Chelicerata
- Class: Arachnida
- Order: Araneae
- Infraorder: Araneomorphae
- Family: Thomisidae
- Genus: Mystaria
- Species: M. lindaicapensis

Binomial name
- Mystaria lindaicapensis Lewis & Dippenaar-Schoeman, 2014

= Mystaria lindaicapensis =

Linda's Beetle Crab Spider

Species of spider

Mystaria lindaicapensis is a species of spider in the family Thomisidae. It is endemic to South Africa and is commonly known as Linda's beetle crab spider.

== Distribution ==
Mystaria lindaicapensis is found in South Africa, where it has been sampled from Eastern Cape and Western Cape provinces. Known locations include Jeffreys Bay, Addo Elephant National Park, Knysna and Uitzicht Annex.

== Habitat and ecology ==
Mystaria lindaicapensis is sampled by beating and sweeping vegetation in grassland and wooded grasslands of coastal dune forests. The species has been collected from Forest and Thicket biomes. It occurs at altitudes ranging from 8 to 587 m.

== Conservation ==
Mystaria lindaicapensis is listed as Vulnerable by the South African National Biodiversity Institute. There is ongoing loss of coastal habitat to housing development. Currently known from four locations, the species qualifies for listing as Vulnerable.The species is protected in Addo Elephant National Park, but more sampling is needed to determine range and threats.
