= Mystaria variabilis =

Tanzania Beetle Crab Spider

Scientific classification
- Kingdom: Animalia
- Phylum: Arthropoda
- Subphylum: Chelicerata
- Class: Arachnida
- Order: Araneae
- Infraorder: Araneomorphae
- Family: Thomisidae
- Genus: Mystaria
- Species: M. variabilis

Binomial name
- Mystaria variabilis (Lessert, 1919)

Synonyms
- Paramystaria variabilis Lessert, 1919

Species of spider

Mystaria variabilis is a species of spider in the family Thomisidae. It is endemic to Africa and is commonly known as Tanzania beetle crab spider.

== Distribution ==
Mystaria variabilis is found in Ethiopia, Democratic Republic of the Congo, Uganda, Kenya, Rwanda, Tanzania, Malawi, Mozambique and South Africa.

In South Africa, the species is known from Eastern Cape and KwaZulu-Natal. Notable locations include Port Alfred, Addo Elephant National Park, Mkhambathi Nature Reserve and iSimangaliso Wetland Park.

== Habitat and ecology ==
Mystaria variabilis is sampled from vegetation in Indian Ocean Coastal Belt, Thicket and Savanna biomes at altitudes ranging from 1 to 59 m.

Adults were found throughout the year, while juveniles were collected from May until October.

== Conservation ==
Mystaria variabilis is listed as Least Concern by the South African National Biodiversity Institute due to its wide geographical range. The species is protected in three protected areas including Addo Elephant National Park, Mkhambathi Nature Reserve and Kosi Bay Nature Reserve.

== Taxonomy ==
Mystaria variabilis was originally described as Paramystaria variabilis by Roger de Lessert in 1919 from Tanzania. The species was transferred to Mystaria and revised by Lewis and Dippenaar-Schoeman in 2014.
