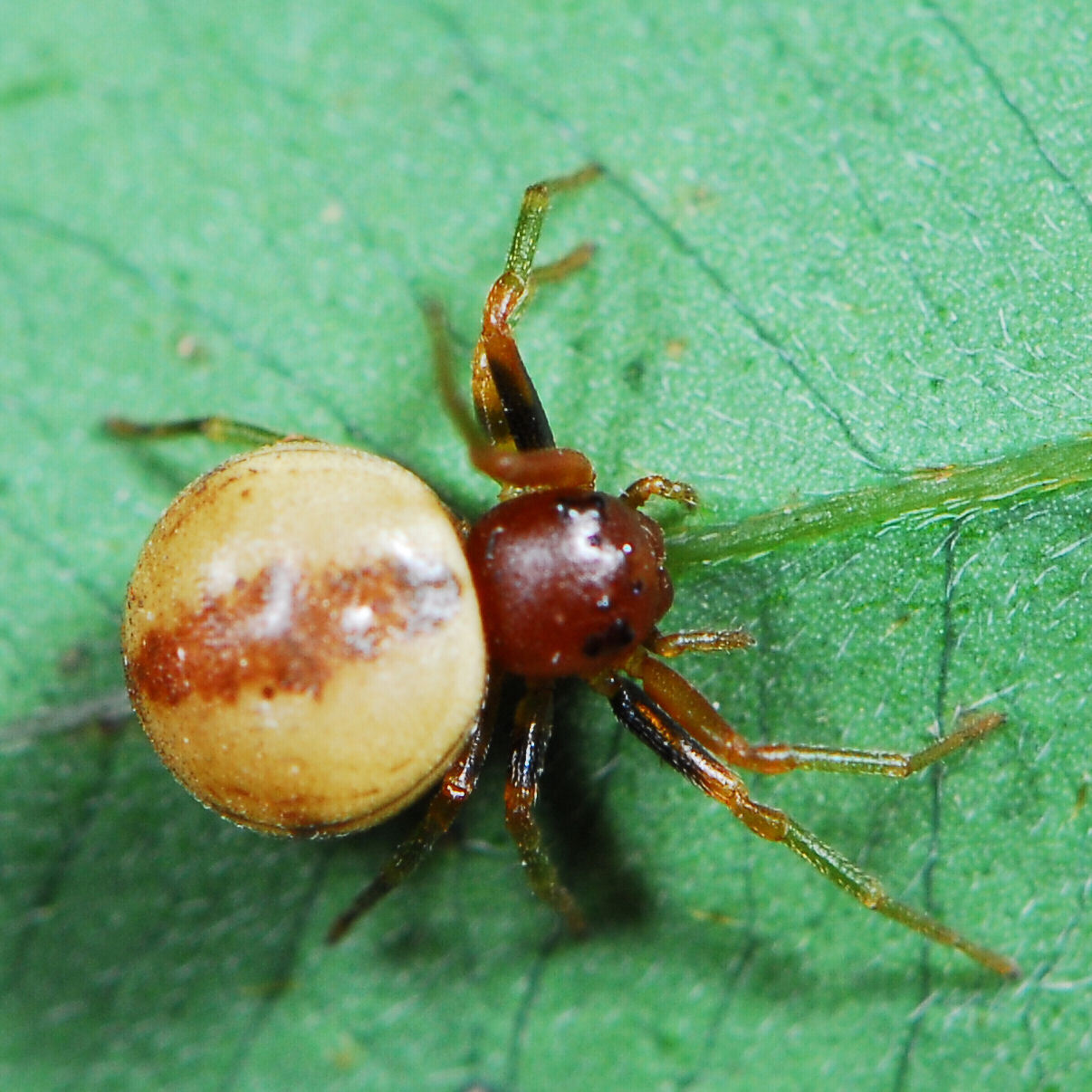
- female
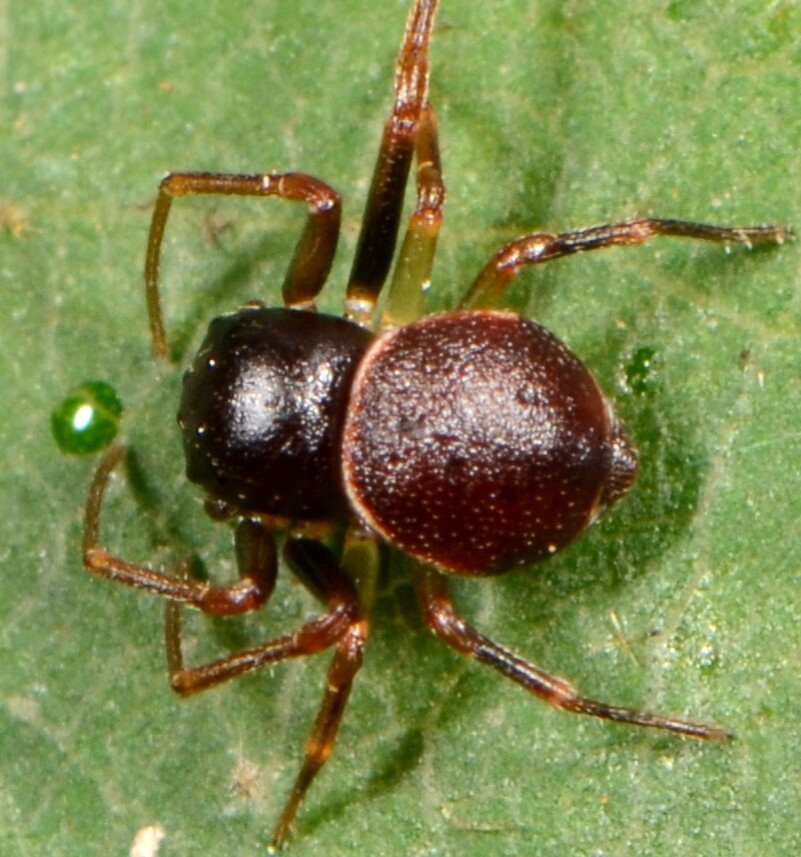
- male

Scientific classification
- Kingdom: Animalia
- Phylum: Arthropoda
- Subphylum: Chelicerata
- Class: Arachnida
- Order: Araneae
- Infraorder: Araneomorphae
- Family: Thomisidae
- Genus: Mystaria
- Species: M. flavoguttata

Binomial name
- Mystaria flavoguttata (Lawrence, 1952)

Synonyms
- Paramystaria flavoguttata Lawrence, 1952

= Mystaria flavoguttata =

Species of spider

Mystaria flavoguttata is a species of spider in the family Thomisidae. It is endemic to Africa.

== Distribution ==
Mystaria flavoguttata is found in Democratic Republic of the Congo, Eswatini and South Africa.

In South Africa, the species is known from three provinces. Notable locations include Cwebe Nature Reserve, Mkhambathi Nature Reserve, Ndumo Game Reserve, Kruger National Park and Lekgalameetse Nature Reserve.

== Habitat and ecology ==
Mystaria flavoguttata has been sampled from trees in savanna and coastal forest habitats. The species has been collected from Forest, Indian Ocean Coastal Belt and Savanna biomes at altitudes ranging from 1 to 969 m.

== Description ==
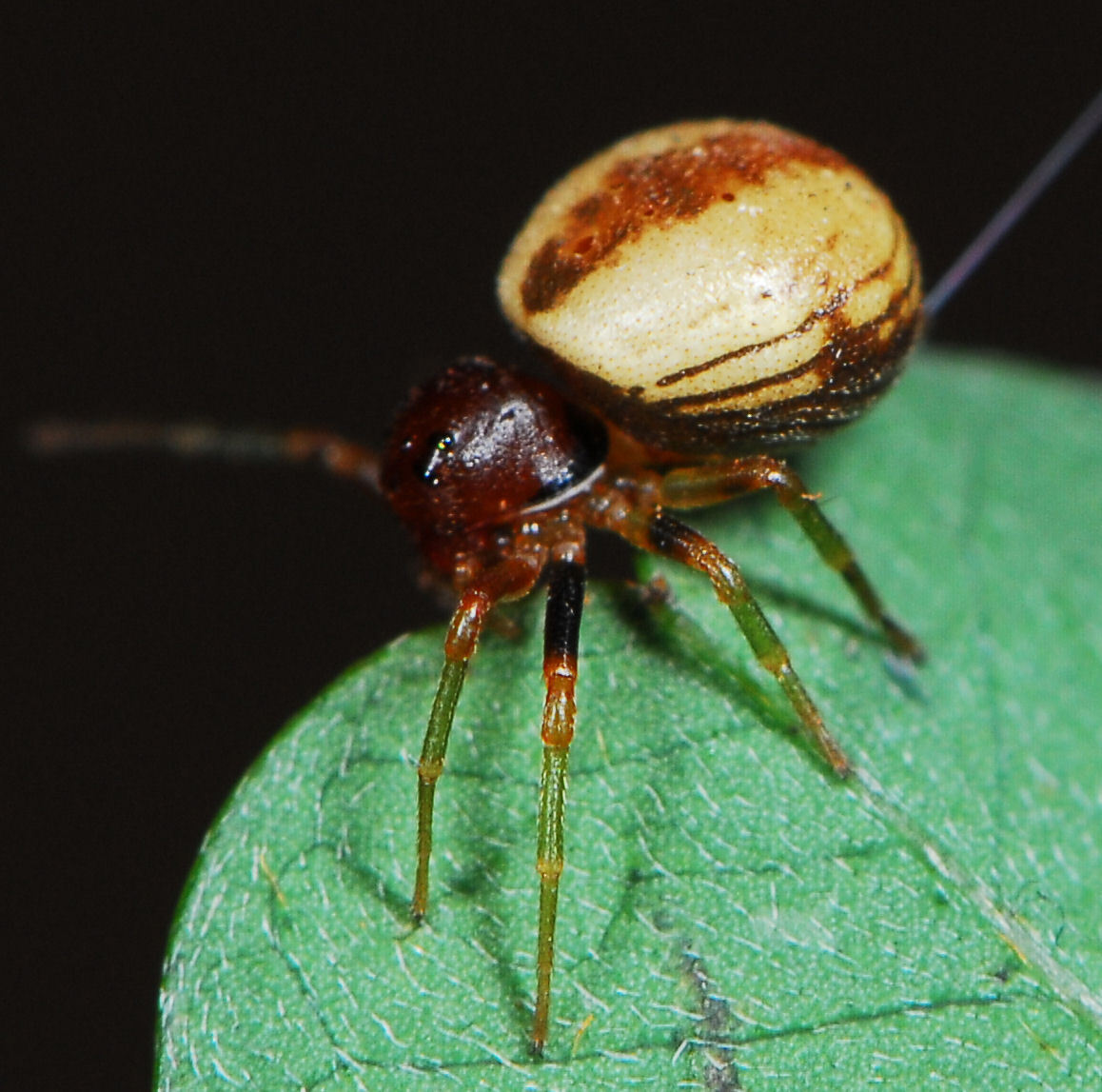
female

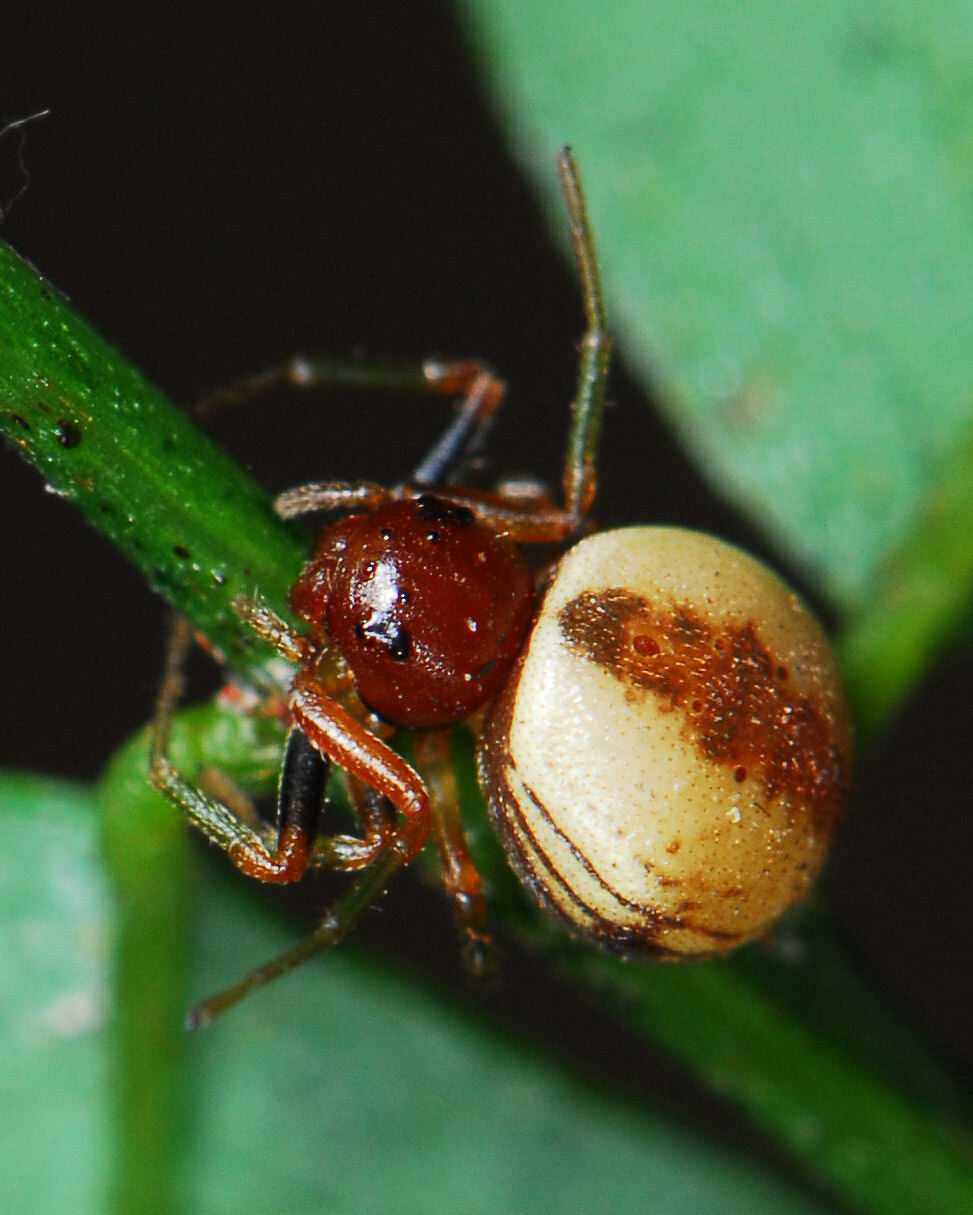
female

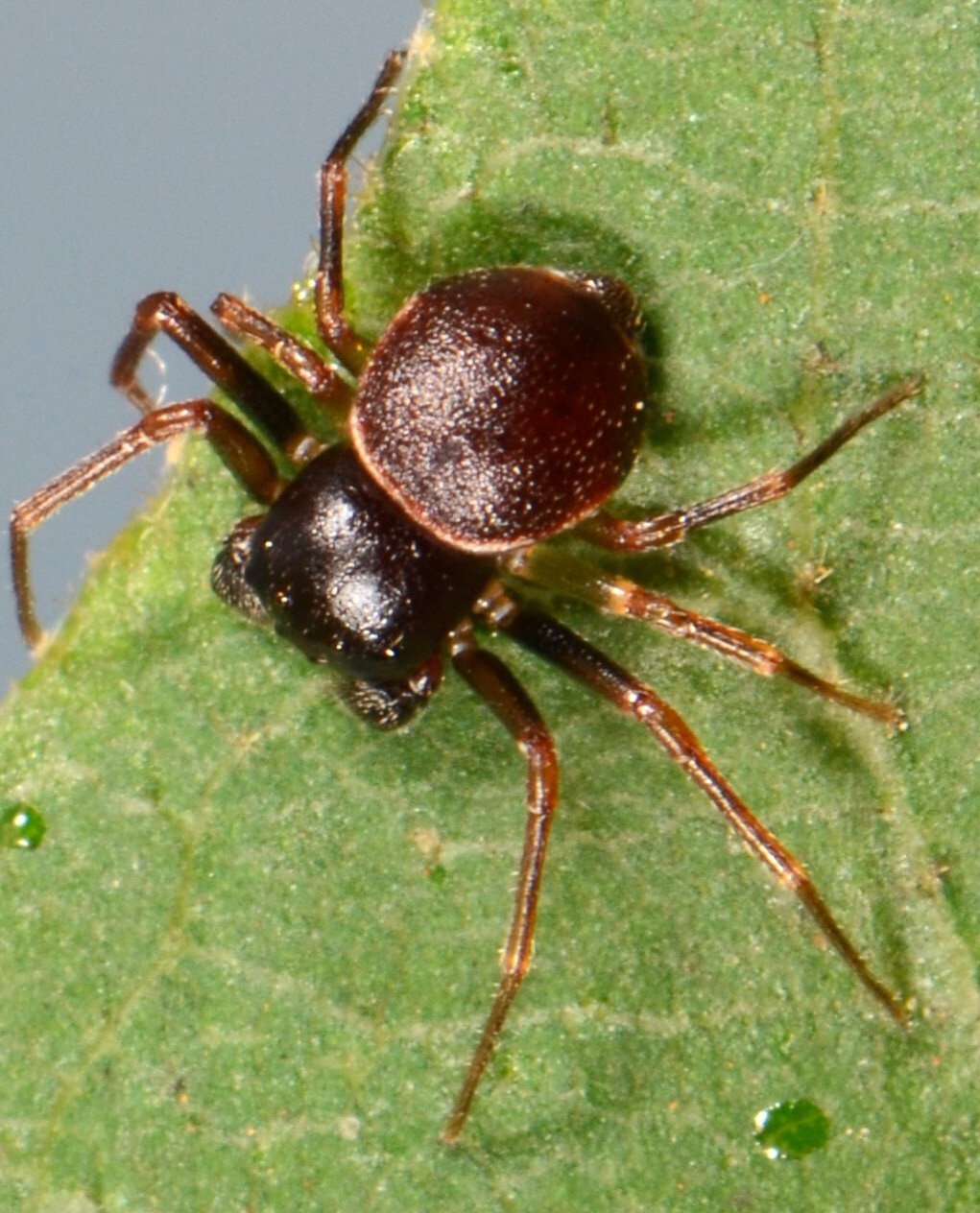
male

== Conservation ==
Mystaria flavoguttata is listed as Least Concern by the South African National Biodiversity Institute due to its wide range. The species is protected in three protected areas including Cwebe Nature Reserve, Ndumo Game Reserve, Lekgalameetse Nature Reserve and Kruger National Park.

== Etymology ==
The specific name means "yellow spotted" in Latin.

== Taxonomy ==
Mystaria flavoguttata was originally described as Paramystaria flavoguttata by Reginald Frederick Lawrence in 1952 from what is now the Democratic Republic of the Congo. The species was transferred to Mystaria and revised by Lewis and Dippenaar-Schoeman in 2014.
