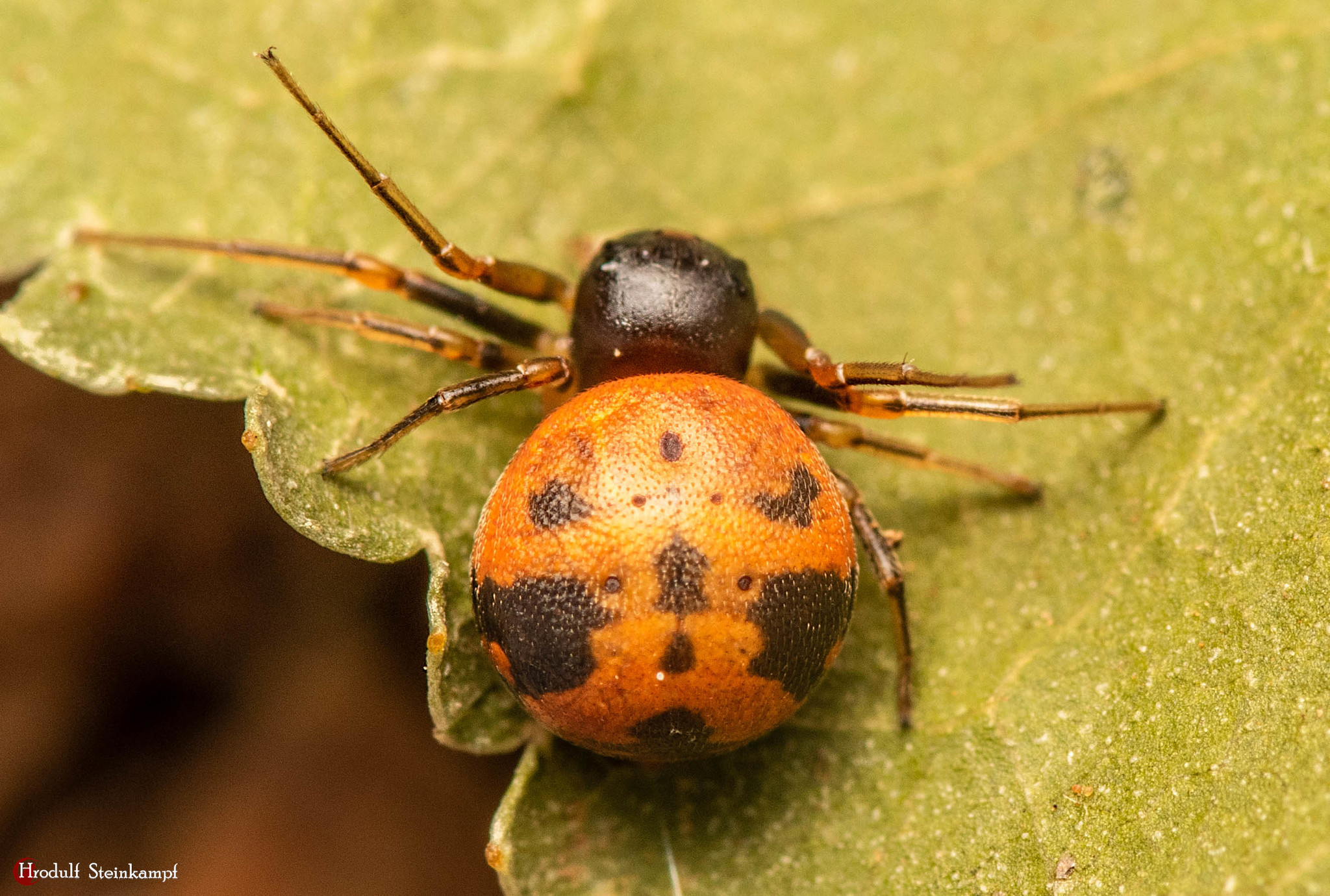

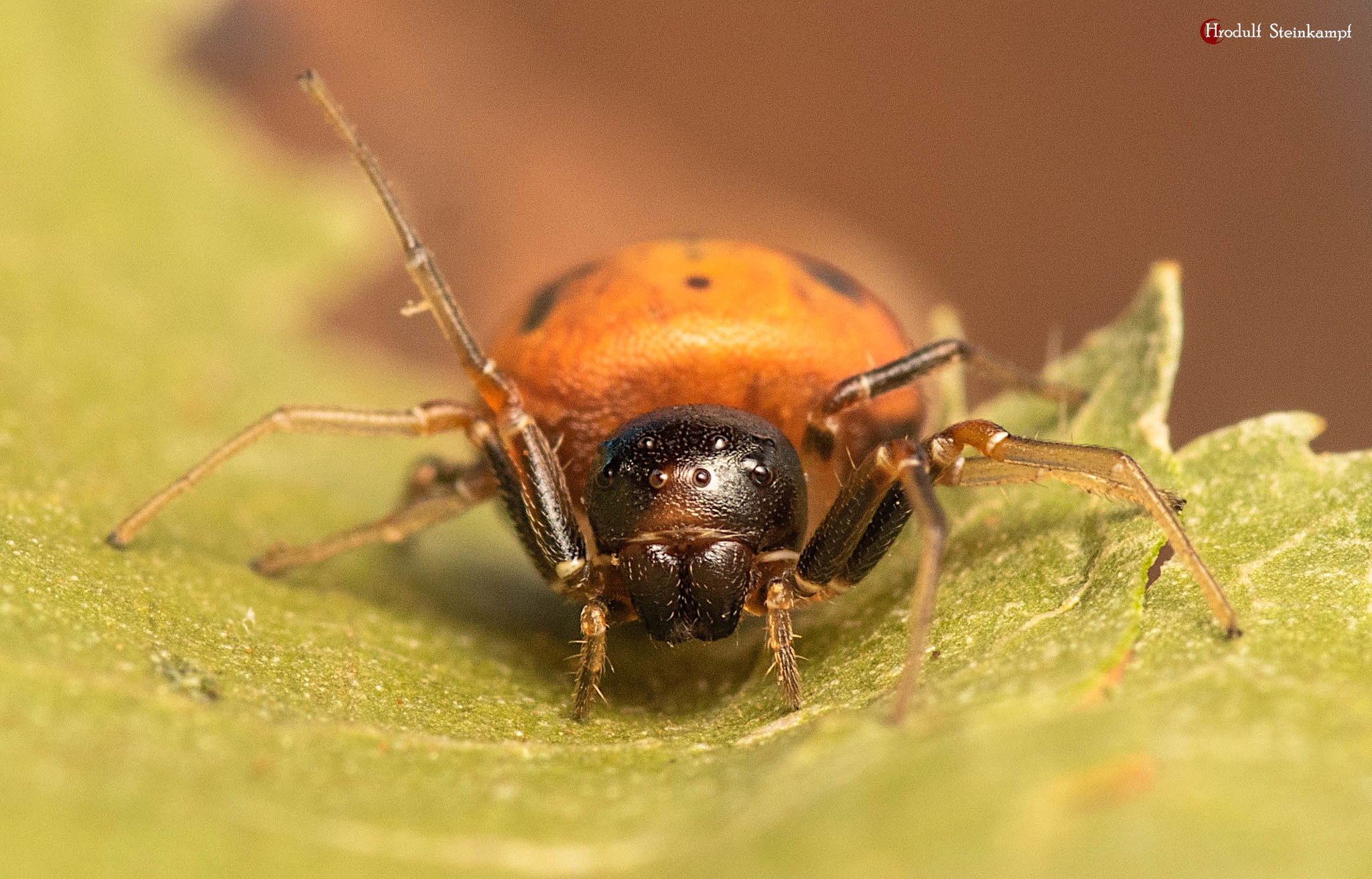

Scientific classification
- Kingdom: Animalia
- Phylum: Arthropoda
- Subphylum: Chelicerata
- Class: Arachnida
- Order: Araneae
- Infraorder: Araneomorphae
- Family: Thomisidae
- Genus: Mystaria
- Species: M. mnyama

Binomial name
- Mystaria mnyama Lewis & Dippenaar-Schoeman, 2014

= Mystaria mnyama =

Tembe's Beetle Crab Spider

Species of spider

Mystaria mnyama is a species of spider in the family Thomisidae. It is endemic to KwaZulu-Natal in South Africa and is commonly known as Tembe's beetle crab spider.

== Distribution ==
Mystaria mnyama is found only in KwaZulu-Natal in South Africa. It has been sampled from Tembe Elephant Park and iSimangaliso Wetland Park.

== Habitat and ecology ==
Mystaria mnyama has been sampled from sweeping and beating vegetation in open woodlands at altitudes ranging from 5 to 91 m.

Only two adults are known, both sampled in July.

== Description ==
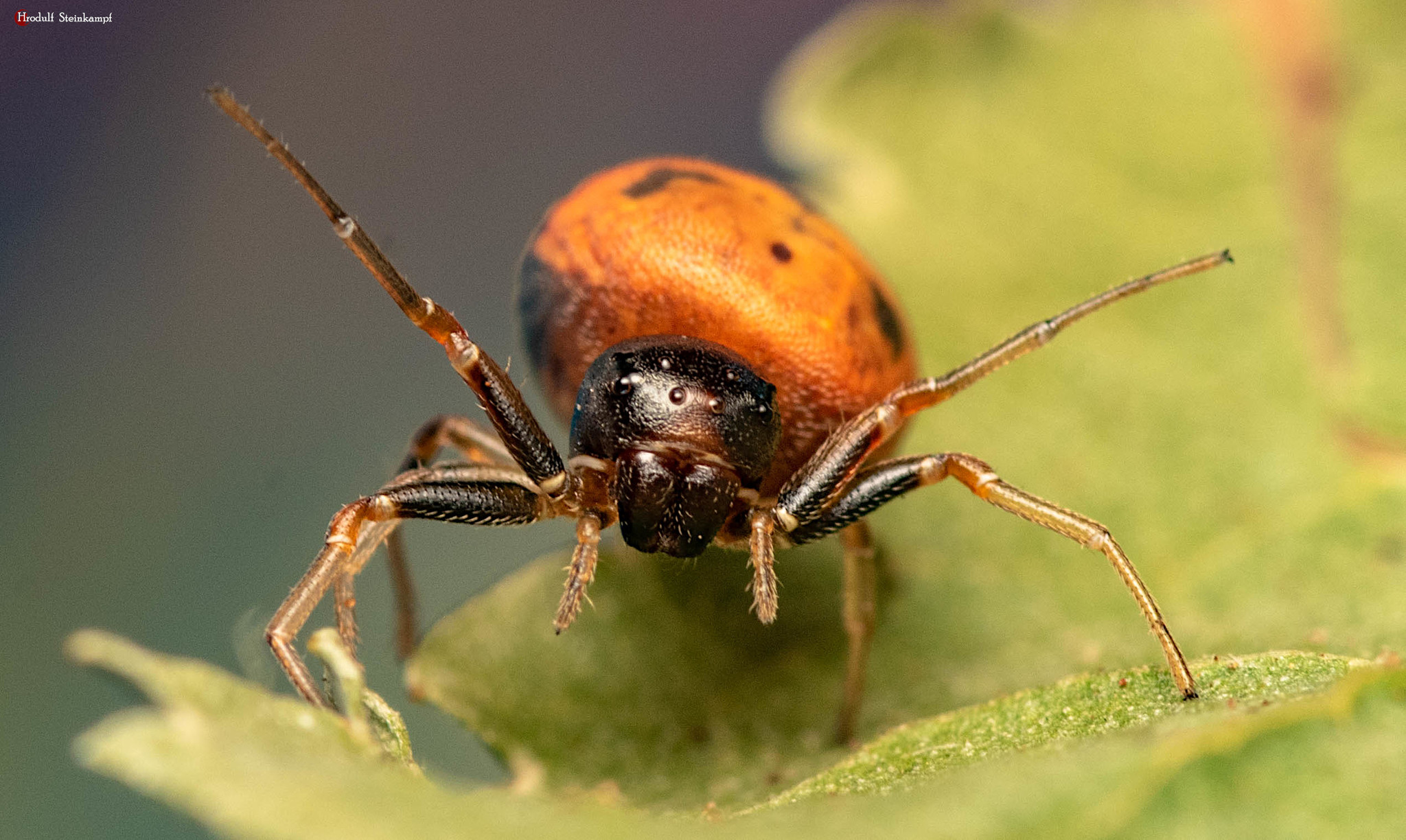

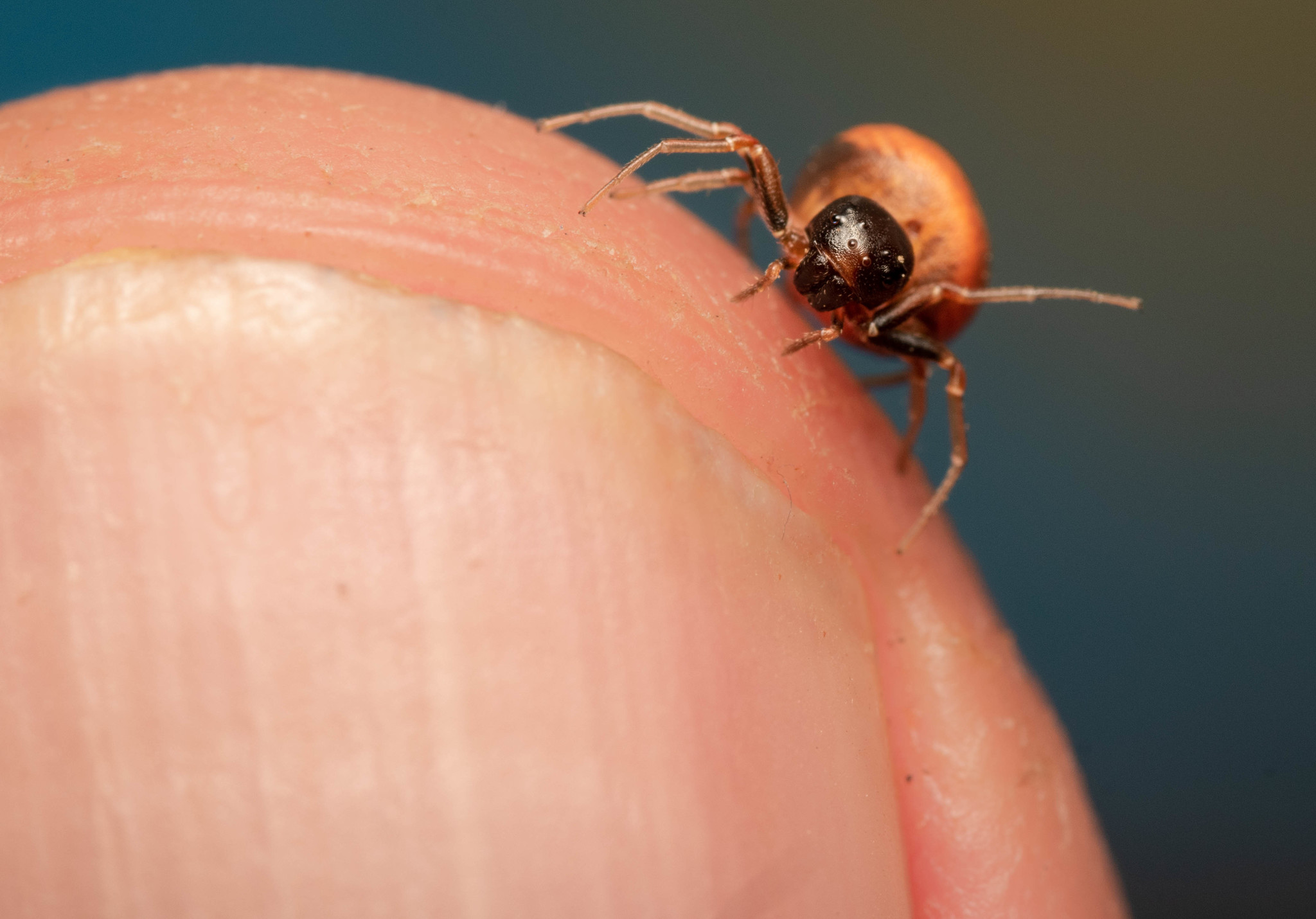

== Conservation ==
Mystaria mnyama is listed as Data Deficient by the South African National Biodiversity Institute. The status of the species remains obscure and more sampling is needed to determine the species range. The species is protected in Tembe Elephant Park and St. Lucia Nature Reserve.
