= Mystaria lata =

Lata Beetle Crab Spider

Scientific classification
- Kingdom: Animalia
- Phylum: Arthropoda
- Subphylum: Chelicerata
- Class: Arachnida
- Order: Araneae
- Infraorder: Araneomorphae
- Family: Thomisidae
- Genus: Mystaria
- Species: M. lata

Binomial name
- Mystaria lata (Lawrence, 1927)

Synonyms
- Paramystaria lata Lawrence, 1927

Species of spider

Mystaria lata is a species of spider in the family Thomisidae. It is endemic to southern Africa and is commonly known as the lata beetle crab spider.

== Distribution ==
Mystaria lata is found in Namibia and South Africa.

In South Africa, the species is known from three provinces. Notable locations include Cwebe Nature Reserve, Vryheid Nature Reserve and Blyde River Canyon Nature Reserve.

== Habitat and ecology ==
Mystaria lata is sampled by beating and sweeping vegetation in grasslands and wooded grasslands of coastal dune forests. The species has also been found near rivers and estuaries.

It has been collected from Indian Ocean Coastal Belt, Savanna and Thicket biomes at altitudes ranging from 19 to 1,212 m.

Adults were sampled between October and January, while juveniles were collected in December.

== Conservation ==
Mystaria lata is listed as Least Concern by the South African National Biodiversity Institute due to its wide geographical range. The species is protected in three reserves including Blyde River Nature Reserve, Cwebe Nature Reserve and Vryheid Nature Reserve.

== Taxonomy ==
Mystaria lata was originally described as Paramystaria lata by Reginald Frederick Lawrence in 1927 from Namibia. The species was transferred to Mystaria and revised by Lewis and Dippenaar-Schoeman in 2014.
