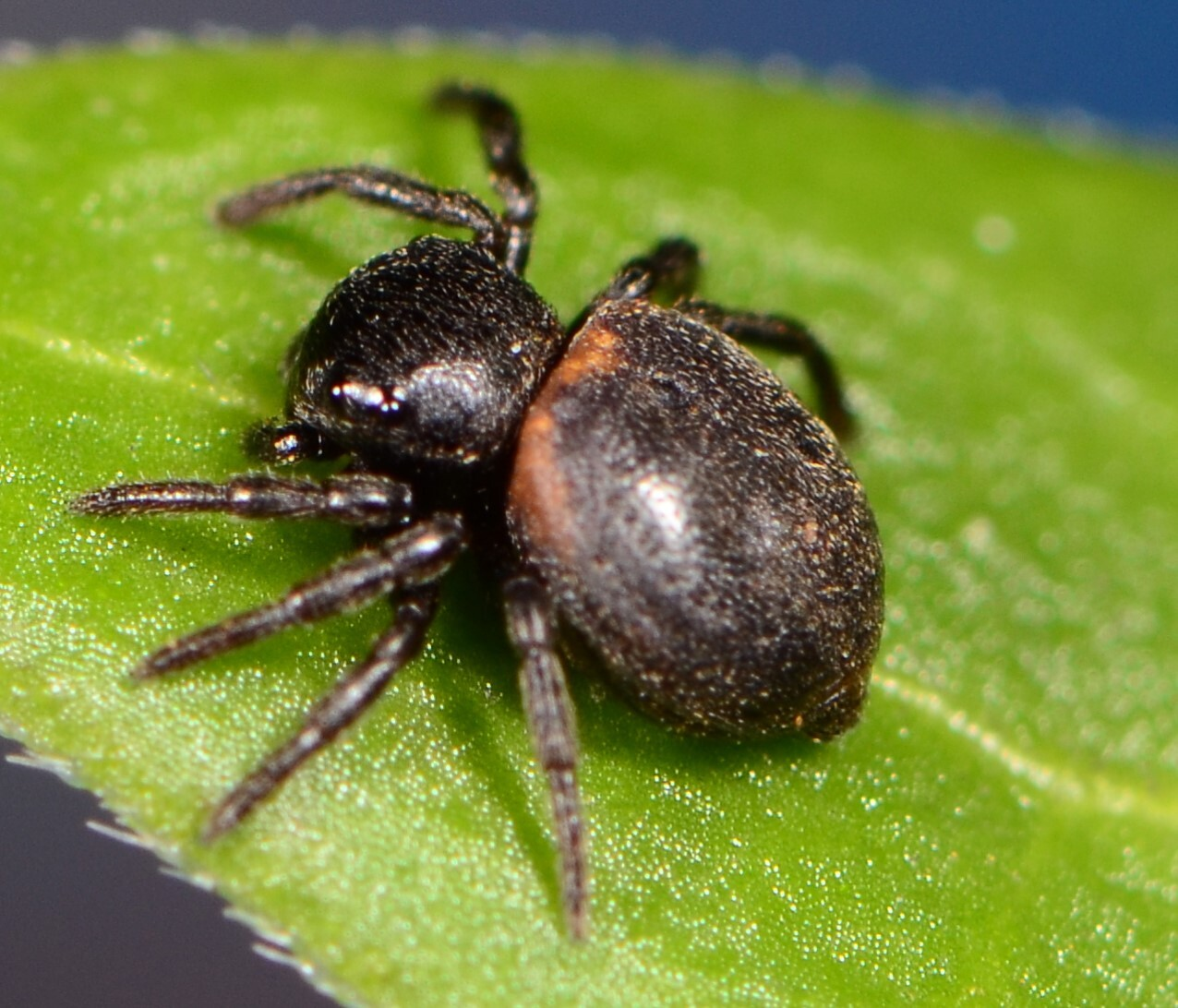
- female
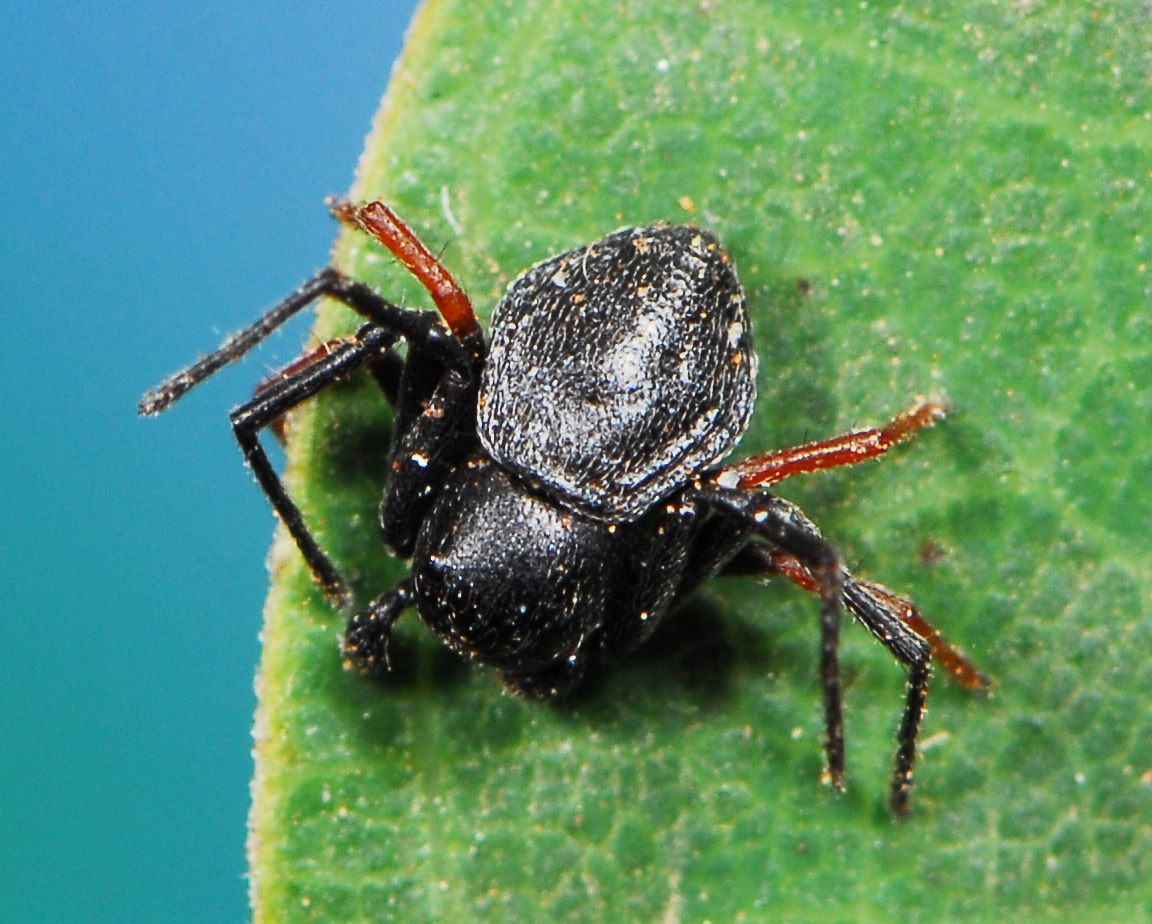
- male

Scientific classification
- Kingdom: Animalia
- Phylum: Arthropoda
- Subphylum: Chelicerata
- Class: Arachnida
- Order: Araneae
- Infraorder: Araneomorphae
- Family: Thomisidae
- Genus: Mystaria
- Species: M. rufolimbata

Binomial name
- Mystaria rufolimbata Simon, 1895

= Mystaria rufolimbata =

Dark Beetle Crab Spider

Species of spider

Mystaria rufolimbata is a species of spider in the family Thomisidae. It is endemic to Africa and is commonly known as the dark beetle crab spider.

== Distribution ==
Mystaria rufolimbata is found in Sierra Leone, Cameroon, Ivory Coast, Congo, Gabon, Mozambique, Democratic Republic of the Congo and South Africa.

In South Africa, the species is known from three provinces. Notable locations include iSimangaliso Wetland Park, Oribi Gorge Nature Reserve, Ndumo Game Reserve, Tembe Elephant Park, Mphaphuli Nature Reserve and Buffelspoort dam.

== Habitat and ecology ==
Mystaria rufolimbata has been collected from vegetation, more specifically from rainforests and Acacia xanthophloea forests.

The species has been sampled from Indian Ocean Coastal Belt, Savanna and Grassland biomes at altitudes ranging from 6 to 1,287 m.

Adults occur from November to July, while juveniles emerge during August.

== Description ==
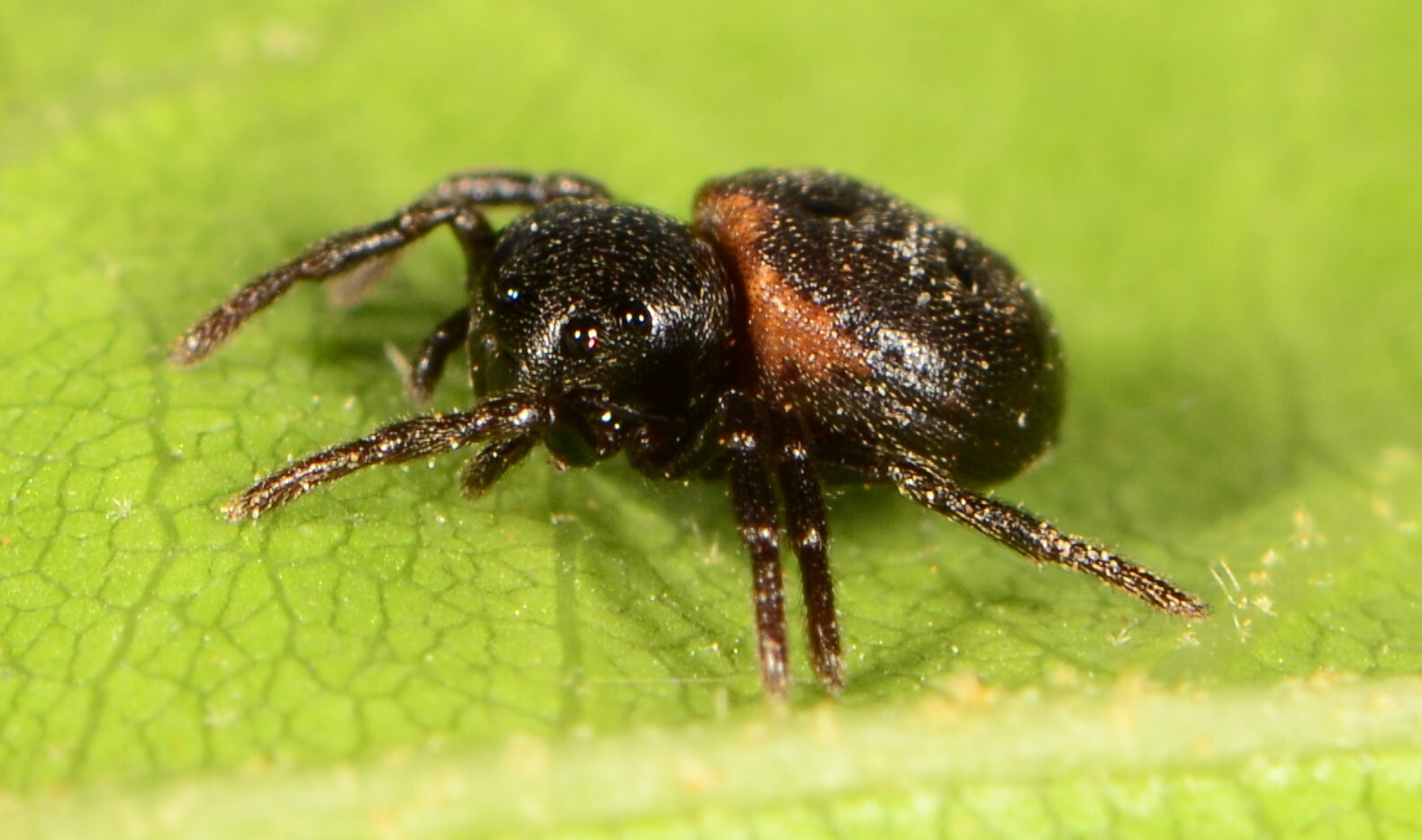
female

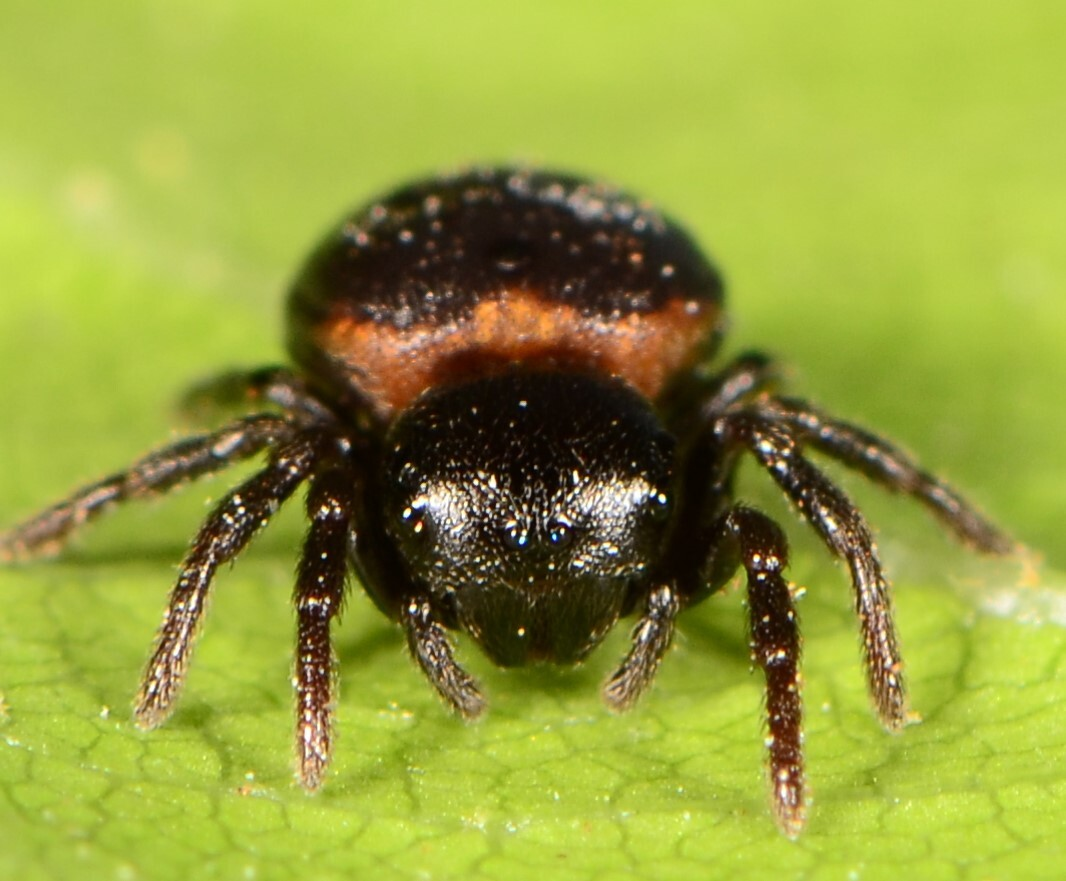
female

== Conservation ==
Mystaria rufolimbata is listed as Least Concern by the South African National Biodiversity Institute due to its wide geographical range. The species is protected in four protected areas including Mphaphuli Nature Reserve, Ndumo Game Reserve, Oribi Gorge Nature Reserve and Tembe Elephant Park.

== Taxonomy ==
Mystaria rufolimbata was originally described by Eugène Simon in 1895 from Sierra Leone. The species was revised by Lewis and Dippenaar-Schoeman in 2014.
