= Lepidochrysops tantalus =

Scientific classification
- Kingdom: Animalia
- Phylum: Arthropoda
- Class: Insecta
- Order: Lepidoptera
- Family: Lycaenidae
- Genus: Lepidochrysops
- Species: L. tantalus

Binomial name
- Lepidochrysops tantalus (Trimen, 1887)

Synonyms
- Lycaena tantalus Trimen, 1887; Cupido tantalus; Neochrysops tantalus

Species of butterfly

Lepidochrysops tantalus, the king blue, is a butterfly of the family Lycaenidae found in South Africa.

== Description ==
It is local to the Drakensberg foothills in the Eastern Cape to the KwaZulu-Natal midlands, Eswatini, then along the escarpment hills to Mpumalanga and Gauteng. It is also found in Limpopo.

The wingspan is 30–38 mm for males and 34–40 mm for females. Adults are on wing from September to November. There is one generation per year.

Despite sharing a common habitat with L. lotana, it can be differentiated by being darker and smaller. It also shows an erratic and unstable flight pattern compared to L.lotana.

== Habitat and behavior ==
The larvae are associated with Becium grandiflorum.
