= Lepidochrysops lotana =

Conservation status
- Endangered (IUCN 3.1)

Scientific classification
- Kingdom: Animalia
- Phylum: Arthropoda
- Class: Insecta
- Order: Lepidoptera
- Family: Lycaenidae
- Genus: Lepidochrysops
- Species: L. lotana

Binomial name
- Lepidochrysops lotana Swanepoel, 1962

Species of butterfly

Lepidochrysops lotana, the Lotana blue, is a species of butterfly in the family Lycaenidae. It is endemic to South Africa.

== Description ==
This species is only known from two localities in the Limpopo province, the western slope of the Ysterberg and from Moria to Serala Forest in the Wolkberg area.

The wingspan is 42–44 mm for males and 42–46 mm for females. Adults are on wing from September to early November. Peak emergence of the species is mid-October. There is one generation per year. The undersides show flat, grey coloration and smal basal black spots beneath the hindwing.

These butterflies have a steadier flight compared to L. tantalus.

== Habitat and behavior ==
The larvae feed on host plant Becium grandiflorum, however, there's a scarcity of these plants due to overgrazing and infrequent fires, indicating endangerment of L. lotana.
