= Mystaria occidentalis =

Guinea's Beetle Crab Spider

Scientific classification
- Kingdom: Animalia
- Phylum: Arthropoda
- Subphylum: Chelicerata
- Class: Arachnida
- Order: Araneae
- Infraorder: Araneomorphae
- Family: Thomisidae
- Genus: Mystaria
- Species: M. occidentalis

Binomial name
- Mystaria occidentalis (Millot, 1942)

Synonyms
- Paramystaria variabilis occidentalis Millot, 1942

Species of spider

Mystaria occidentalis is a species of spider in the family Thomisidae. It is endemic to Africa and is commonly known as Guinea's beetle crab spider.

== Distribution ==
Mystaria occidentalis is found in Guinea, Cameroon, Congo, Uganda, Rwanda, Tanzania, Mozambique and South Africa.

In South Africa, the species is known from two provinces. Notable locations include Kei River Mouth, Umtamvuna Nature Reserve, Mtunzini and iSimangaliso Wetland Park.

== Habitat and ecology ==
Mystaria occidentalis is sampled from sweeping and beating vegetation in coastal beach forest, gallery forests, marshy areas near lakes and mountainous areas. The species has been collected from Indian Ocean Coastal Belt and Savanna biomes at altitudes ranging from 6 to 601 m.

Adults were collected over a year period from July to April, while juveniles were collected from March to June.

== Conservation ==
Mystaria occidentalis is listed as Least Concern by the South African National Biodiversity Institute due to its wide geographical range. The species is protected in Umtamvuna Nature Reserve.

== Taxonomy ==
Mystaria occidentalis was originally described as Paramystaria variabilis occidentalis by Jacques Millot in 1942 from Guinea. The species was transferred to Mystaria, elevated to species rank, and revised by Lewis and Dippenaar-Schoeman in 2014.
