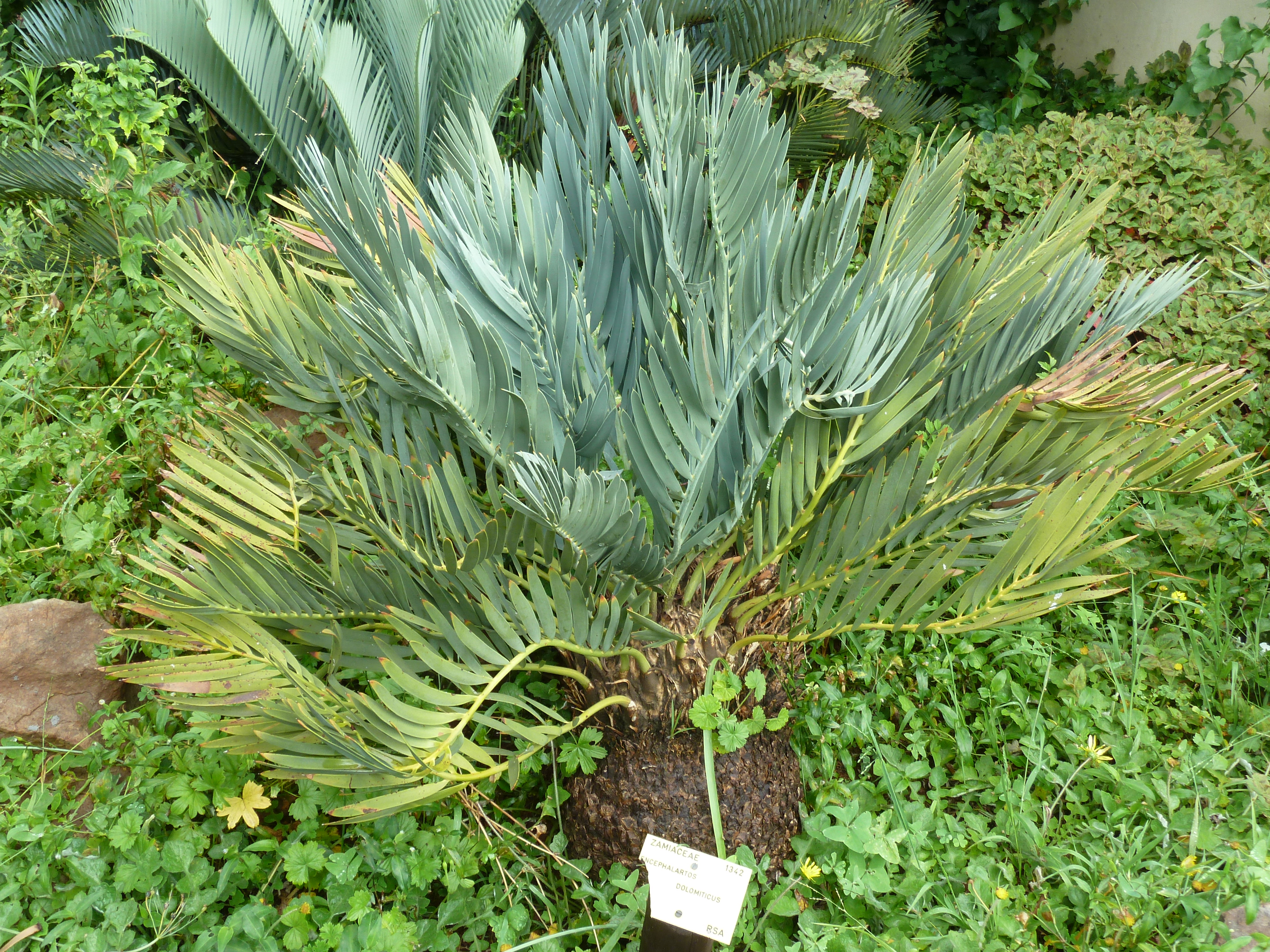

Conservation status
- Critically endangered, possibly extinct in the wild (IUCN 3.1)
- CITES Appendix I (CITES)

Scientific classification
- Kingdom: Plantae
- Clade: Tracheophytes
- Clade: Gymnospermae
- Division: Cycadophyta
- Class: Cycadopsida
- Order: Cycadales
- Family: Zamiaceae
- Genus: Encephalartos
- Species: E. dolomiticus

Binomial name
- Encephalartos dolomiticus Lavranos & D.L. Goode 1988

= Encephalartos dolomiticus =

Wolkberg cycad

Species of cycad

Encephalartos dolomiticus, the Wolkberg cycad, is a critically endangered species of cycad. It is only found in the Wolkberg at elevations of 1100–1500 meters. The area is near Penge in southeastern Limpopo Province, South Africa.

== Description ==
It's a tree-like cycad, growing up to 2 m tall and 40 cm wide at its base, often with additional shoots sprouting from the bottom. Its bluish leaves form a crown at the top, reaching 60–80 cm in length, sometimes twisted. The lance-shaped leaflets, 12–17 cm long, angle oppositely along the rachis at 45°, with smooth margins and occasional small teeth on the lower side. The straight petiole has small spines. It's a dioecious species, with green ovoid male cones, 35–50 cm long and 10 cm wide. Female cones, 30–45 cm long and 18–25 cm wide, are of similar shape, with up to three growing on each plant. The macrosporophylls have a warty surface. Seeds are oblong, 30–35 mm long, covered by a yellow sarcotesta.
