= Wolkberg =

Mountain range in Limpopo, South Africa

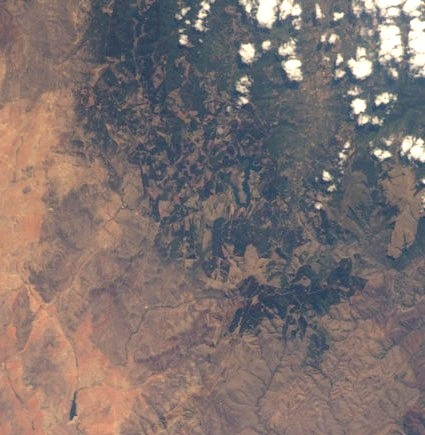
- NASA picture of the Wolkberg

Highest point
- Peak: Ysterkroon
- Elevation: 2,126 m (6,975 ft)
- Listing: List of mountain ranges of South Africa
- Coordinates: 24°3′54″S 30°3′54″E

Dimensions
- Length: 30 km (19 mi) NW/SE
- Width: 10 km (6.2 mi) NE/SW

Geography
- Location within South Africa
- Country: South Africa
- Province: Limpopo
- Parent range: Drakensberg

Geology
- Orogeny: Kaapvaal craton
- Rock age: Neoarchean to early Paleoproterozoic
- Rock type(s): Bushveld igneous complex, sandstone

The Wolkberg is a mountain range in Tzaneen, Limpopo Province, South Africa. It is a northern termination and a subrange of the Drakensberg mountain range which lines up from Eastern Cape, Lesotho, Kwazulu Natal and Mpumalanga. At 2200 m (7200 ft) above sea level, it is the highest mountain range in Limpopo, together with the Iron crown mountain. The range extends for about 30 km (19 mi) in a NW/SE direction north of Sekhukhuneland. The nearest towns are Haenertsburg and Tzaneen.

== Physiography ==
The range forms a high plateau reaching up to 2126 m in height at the Ysterkroon, its highest point. Other conspicuous peaks are 2050 m high Serala, 1838 m high Mamotswiri, 1667 m high Magopalone and 1611 m high Selemole.

The Wolkberg is the source of many small mountain streams, as well as the Mohlapitse and the Ga-Selati River, tributaries of the Olifants River.

== Ecology ==
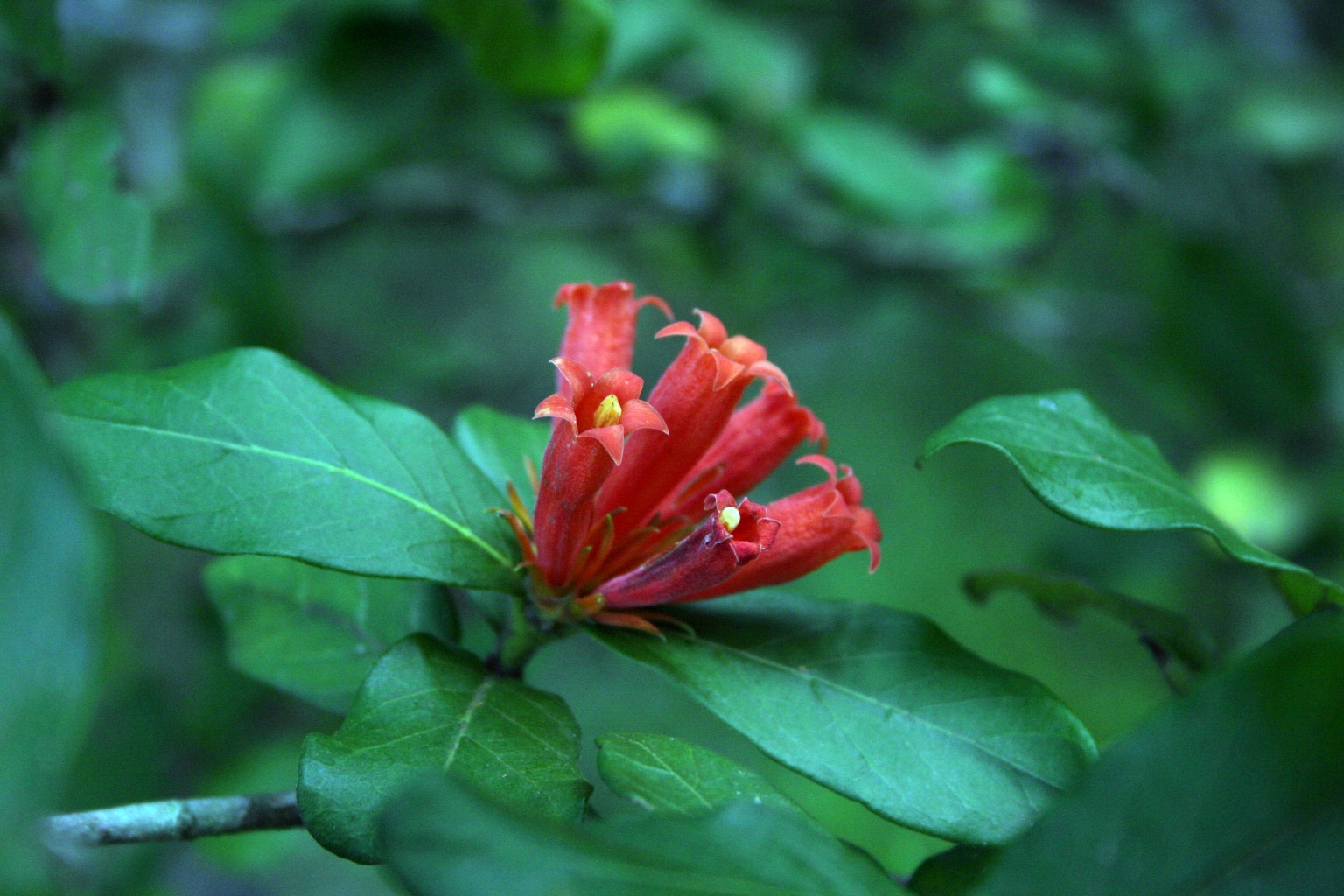
Burchellia bubalina growing in the Wolkberg

Weather can change very fast from clear skies to becoming misty, with the highest reaches enveloped in clouds. Hence the name of the range, meaning "Cloud Mountain" in Afrikaans. The Wolkberg is rugged, with rocky shoulders and deep humid gorges. There are rare plant and animal species in these areas. Species such as the Wolkberg Zulu (Alaena margaritacea), the Wolkberg aloe (Aloe dolomitica), Wolkberg cycad (Encephalartos dolomiticus), the Wolkberg widow (Dingana clara) and the Wolkberg sandman (Spialia secessus), have been named after these mountains. Some species like the critically endangered butterfly Lotana blue (Lepidochrysops lotana) are only known from the Wolkberg area.

The Wolkberg Wilderness Area is a protected area located in the range.

== See also ==
- Wolkberg Wilderness Area
- List of mountain ranges of South Africa
