= Wolkberg Wilderness Area =

Protected area in Limpopo, South Africa

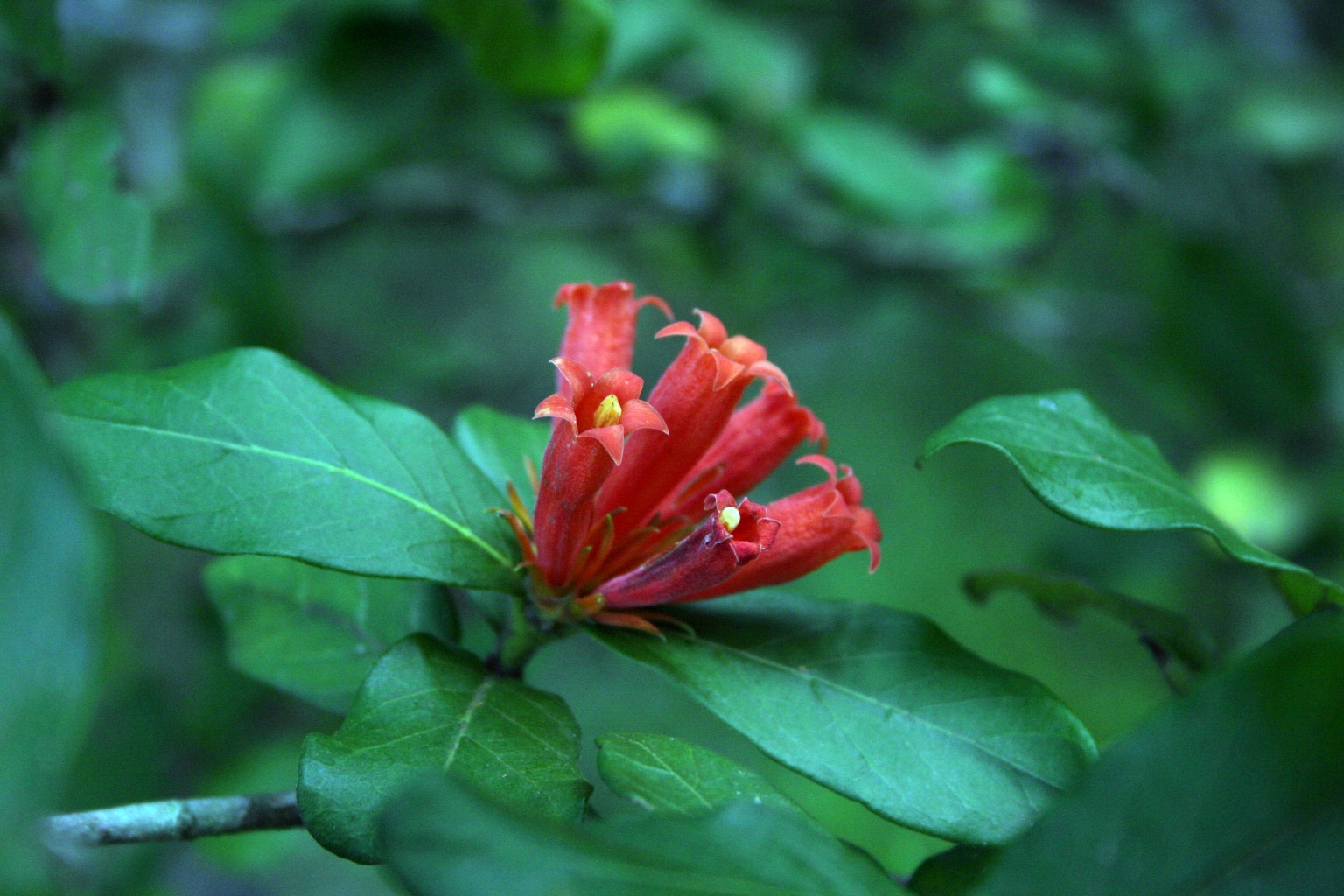
- Burchellia bubalina, one of the rare plants growing in the Wolkberg
- Location of the Wilderness Area in Limpopo
- Location: Limpopo, South Africa
- Nearest city: Haenertsburg
- Coordinates: 24°03′S 30°06′E
- Established: 28 October 1977; 48 years ago

The Wolkberg Wilderness Area is a protected area in Limpopo Province, South Africa. It is located in the Wolkberg (English: Cloud mountain), a subrange of the Drakensberg approximately 14 kilometres (8.7 mi) south-east of Haenertsburg and 60 kilometres (37 mi) east of Polokwane. The 2,127 metres (6,978 ft) high Ysterkroon and the surrounding 22,000 hectares (54,000 acres) was proclaimed a Wilderness Area in 1977.

The office, parking and camping site are located at the Klipdraai forest station. The park is traversed by the Mohlapitse River, a tributary of the Olifants River.

Many birds have their habitat in this protected area, including rare bat hawks, black eagles, crowned eagles, hamerkops, and pearl-breasted swallows.

== See also ==
- Wolkberg
- Protected areas of South Africa
