= Mohlapitse River =

- Location of the Mohlapitse River's confluence with the Olifants

Location
- Country: South Africa
- State: Limpopo Province

Physical characteristics
- Mouth: Olifants River
  - location: Limpopo Province
  - coordinates: 24.2366°S 30.0781°E

The Mohlapitse River is a small river in Limpopo Province, South Africa. It flows due south and is a central tributary of the Olifants River, joining its right bank at a 90° angle.

== See also ==
- List of rivers of South Africa
