= Dinokeng Game Reserve =

South Africa wildlife sanctuary

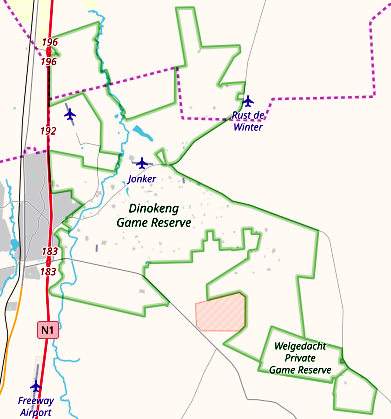

- Location within South Africa Location within Africa
- Location: Dinokeng Game Reserve, Gauteng, South Africa
- Coordinates: 25°40′S 28°40′E
- Area: 210 km^{2} (81 sq mi)
- Established: 2011

The Dinokeng Game Reserve is a wildlife reserve in the province of Gauteng, South Africa and can be accessed via the N1 route. It is a 40-minute drive from Pretoria or 75 minutes from the O. R. Tambo Airport and Johannesburg. The reserve has the Big Five game animals, and is open for visitors to explore. It covers an area of approximately 21,000 hectares. The name, Dinokeng, is derived from the language of the Tswana and Bapedi people, and is translated as “a place of rivers”.

== History ==
The Dinokeng Game Reserve is part of the Gauteng government's “Blue IQ" project (an entity of the Gauteng Department of Economic Development). The Gauteng Provincial Government established the Dinokeng Game Reserve to promote ecotourism in the region. In 1997, the then Premier of Gauteng, Tokyo Sexwale, announced a project to develop “Big Five” wild animal sanctuaries in the northeastern part of Pretoria. The main purpose of the government to establish Dinokeng Game Reserve was to develop tourism through the use of local natural resources, thereby increasing the employment rate and living conditions of local people.

The project was intended to support local socio-economic development by creating tourist destinations in historically disadvantaged areas. The development plan involved collaboration between the provincial government and local landowners to attract private sector investment for a tourism-based economy. The Gauteng Provincial Government and more than 170 landowners have developed the concept that ecotourism can be a source of sustainable rural employment for rural communities. The formal planning of Dinokeng and negotiations with landowners began in early 2000, and Dinokeng Game Reserve was officially opened on September 22, 2011. Big Five animals such as leopard, lion, elephant, and buffalo were gradually re-introduced. With the re-introduction of a group of black rhinoceros in 2018, the reserve contained all of the Big Five game animals.

== Geography and climate ==
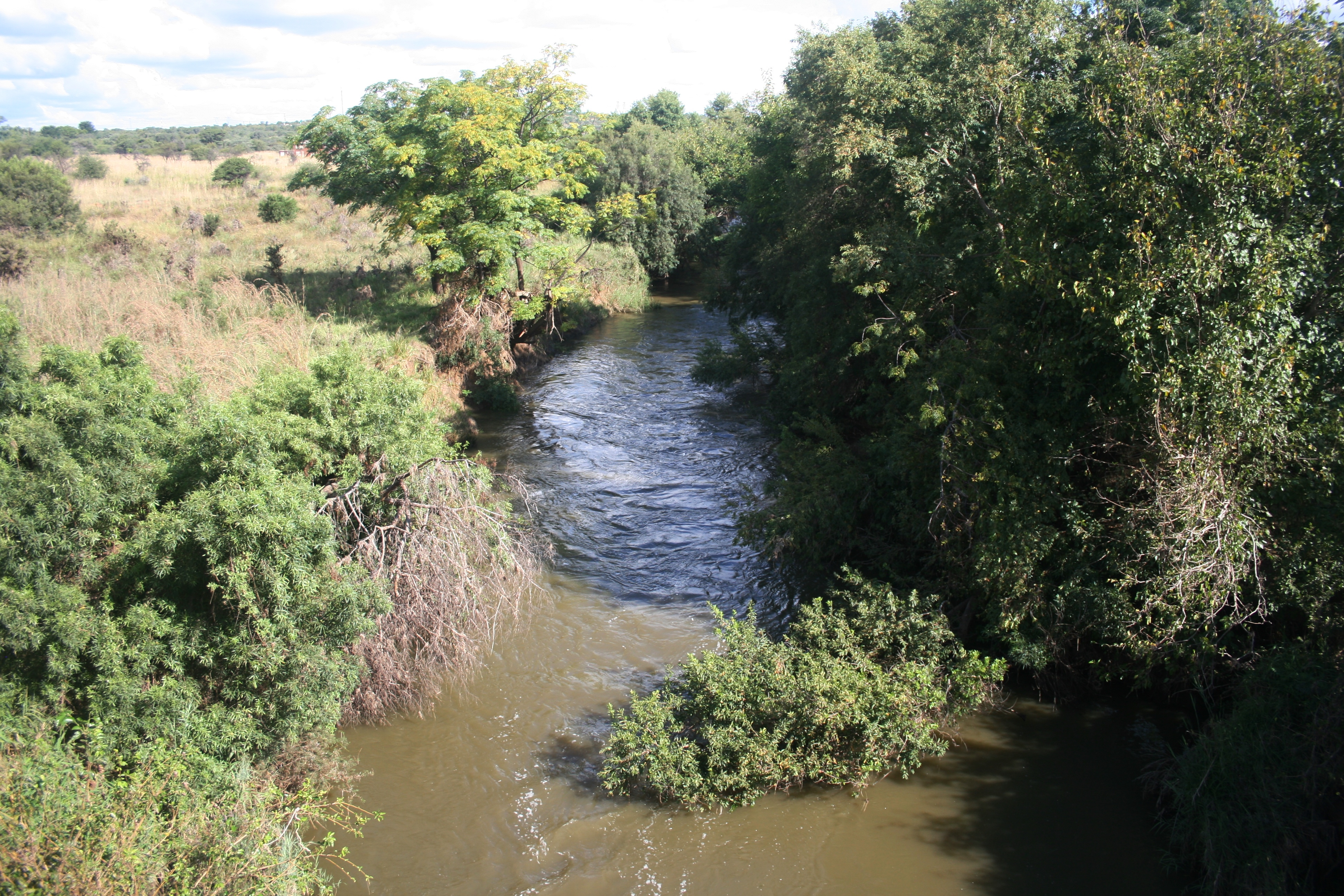
The Pienaars River is the main watercourse in the reserve

Dinokeng Game Reserve is located in Hammanskraal, north of Pretoria, in northeast Gauteng, 130 km (81 mi) from Johannesburg, and close to the N1 and N4 motorways. It covers an area of approximately 21,000 ha (52,000 acres). It is situated between latitude 25°40'S and 25°10'S and between longitude 28°15'E and 28°40'E.

The Dinokeng area experiences summer rainfall patterns in the form of thunderstorms, which are changeable and varied. Most of the rainfall occurs during the summer, and from December to February, temperatures rise to more than 20 degrees. Rainfall varies from 350 mm (14 in) to 750 mm (30 in) per season. In winter, from May to August, the temperature is relatively mild, sunshine is sufficient, but the temperature difference is large in one day, cold in the morning and evening, and sometimes may drop to zero. During a year, the temperature varies between 0° and 40° with a long-term daily average of 21°. The south area of Dinokeng has a relatively mild climate with hot summers and usually rains in the afternoon. It is cool to very cold in winter. The Dinokeng Game Reserve is free of malaria.

== Wildlife ==
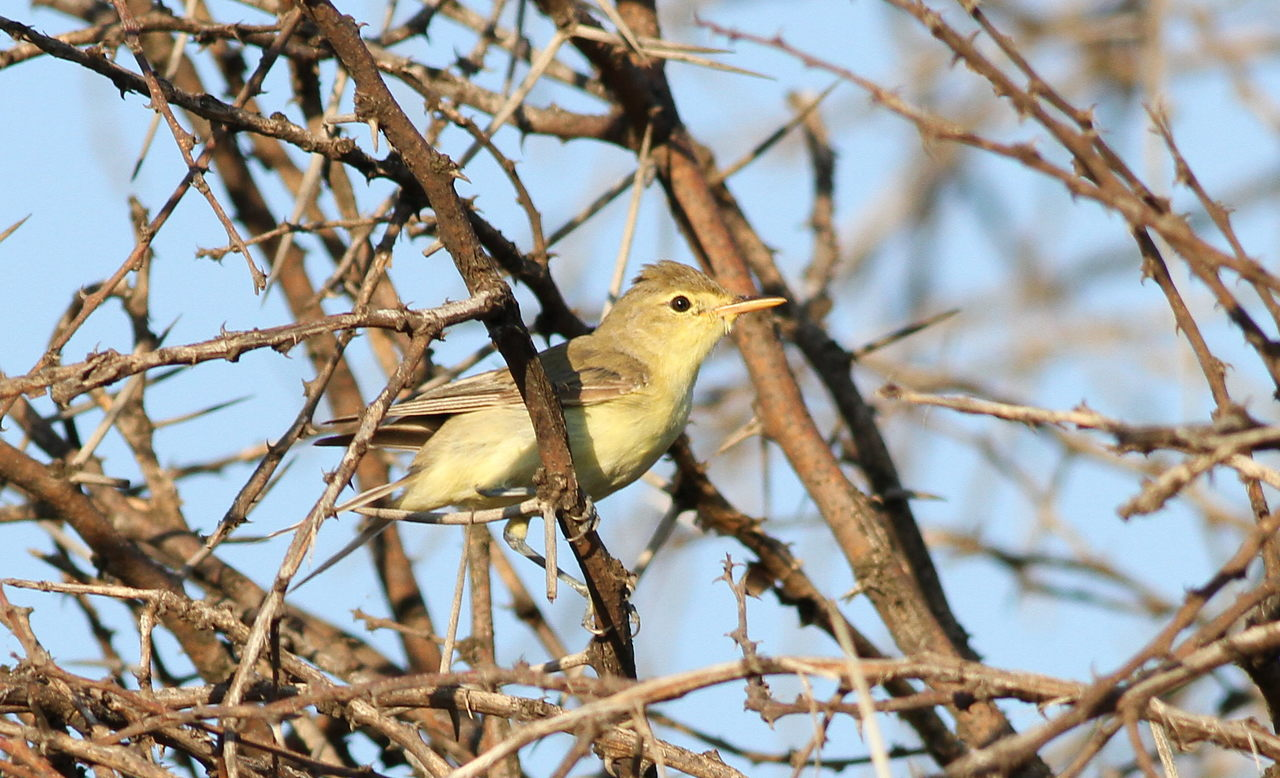
The migratory icterine warbler at Dinokeng Game Reserve

In addition to the Big Five animals (lion, leopard, elephant, cape buffalo and rhinoceros), there are cheetahs, giraffes, zebras, brown hyenas, wildebeests, red hartebeests, tsessebe, eland, kudu, impalas, monkey, hippopotamus and crocodiles. And more than three hundred species of birds, including ostrich, osprey, a pair of breeding martial eagles, the endangered blue crane, guineafowl, herons, the avocet, stilt, jacana and various plovers, go-away-bird, hornbills, kingfishers, woodpeckers, shrikes, larks, bulbuls, swallows, starlings, thrushes, weavers and waxbills. Martial eagles have been classified as a vulnerable species by the IUCN. The reserve is notable for bird watching, containing a number of bird species comparable to sites like Ndumo Game Reserve in KwaZulu-Natal. Due to the unique environment, the relatively close positions of water, grass and bush, various groups of birds are attracted.

== Tourism ==
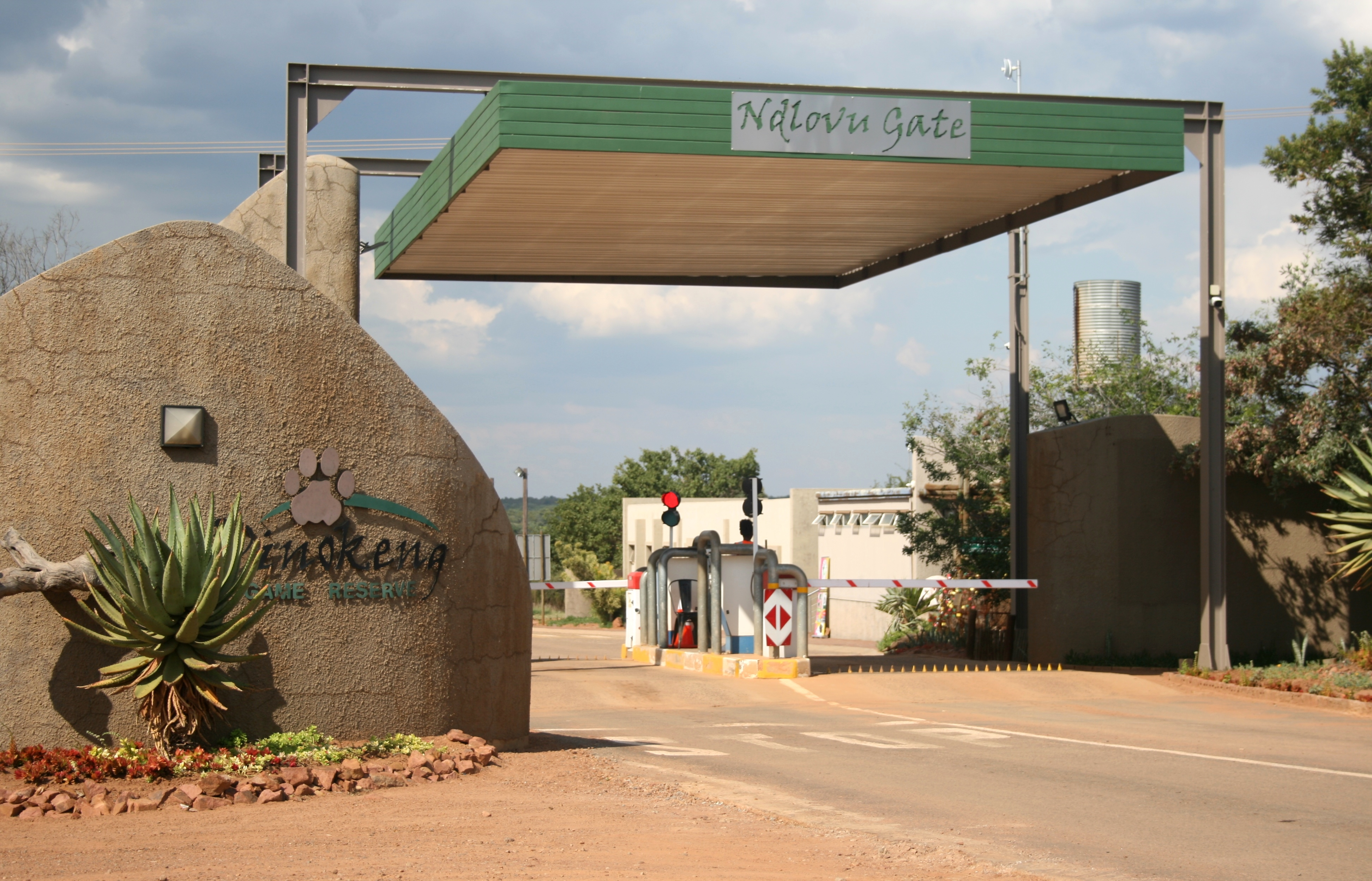
Ndlovu (i.e. elephant) Gate on the R734, one of five access points to the reserve. The others are Ts'ukulu on the R734, Tau and Yingwe on the D48, and Nyati on the D1333 road.

Many adventure tourism companies are located in the metropolitan areas of South Africa, which is an important part of the South African urban tourism market. Dinokeng is one of the popular tourist destinations in Gauteng that offers the natural, historical and cultural sites for visitors. The area includes four tourist hubs: Dinokeng Central, A Birder's Paradise, the Roodeplaat Dam, and the Dinokeng Game Reserve. Boat cruises, self-drive tours, professional game-drives, cultural tours, fishing, spa treatments, hot air ballooning, and restaurants are located in the reserve. In the Dinokeng Game Reserve, users of self-driving routes can choose from three different picnic sites along the route. These picnic sites are built and maintained by private landowners who do not charge for use unless they want visitors to leave these locations. Like most picnic spots in the game reserve, these areas are not fenced.

== Conservation ==
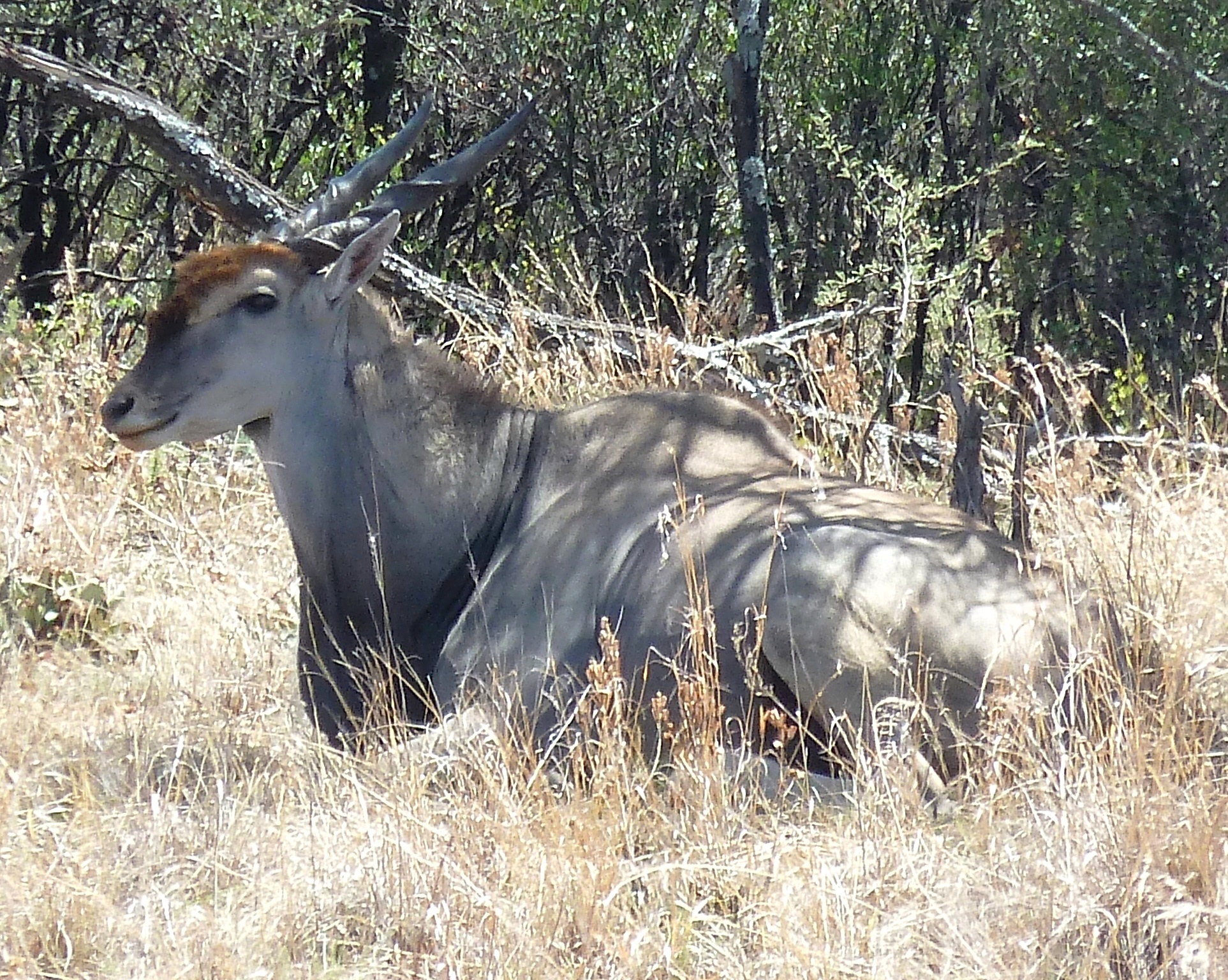

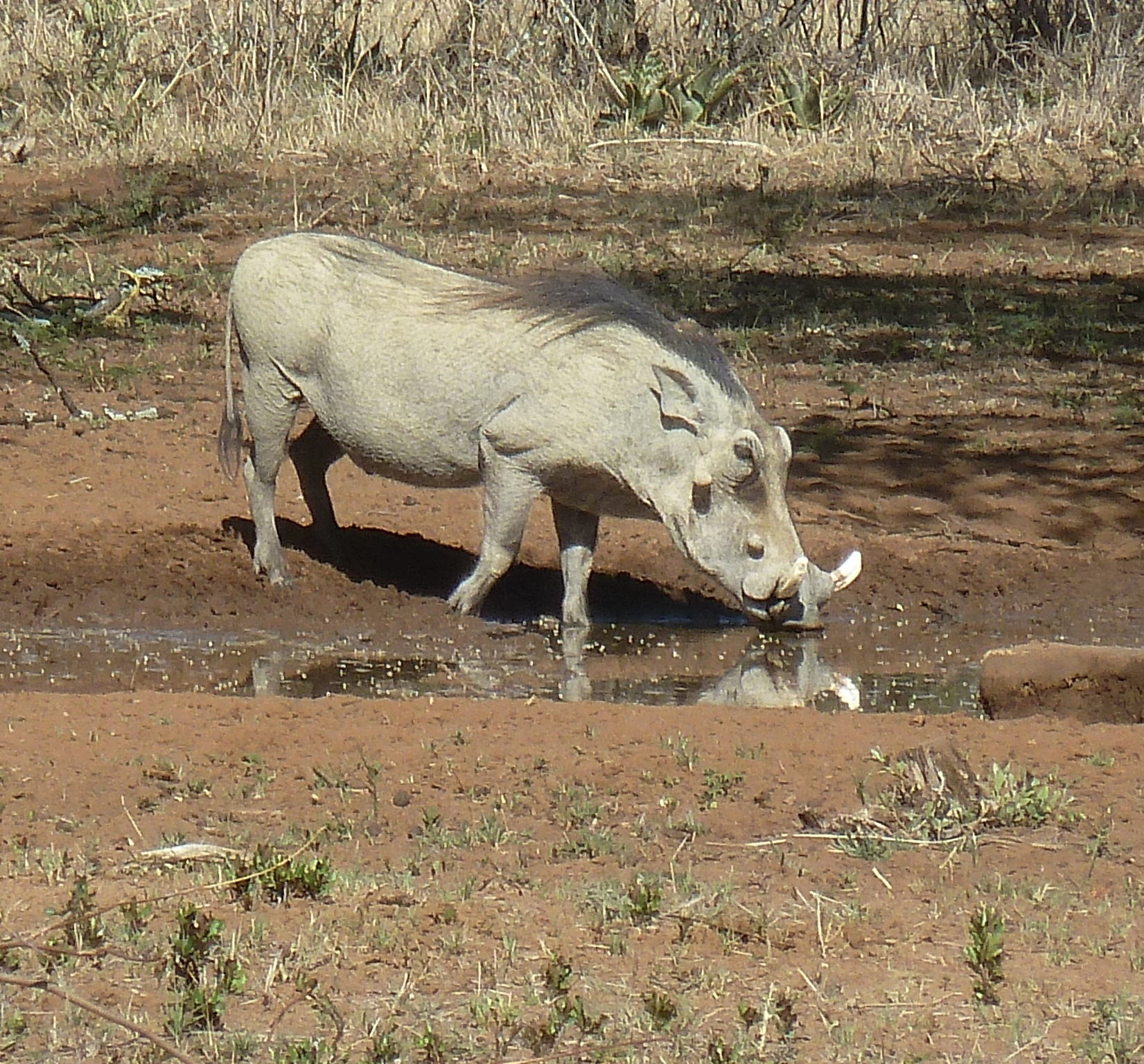
Resting common eland and drinking common warthog near Phakama Lodge

Dinokeng game reserve partnered with the South African government to enforce laws that protect the natural resources of protected areas. Dinokeng Game Reserve is divided into a northern and southern section by the Rust de Winter tar road, with the northern section containing predominantly sweet-veld grasses and the southern section containing predominantly sour-veld grasses. Due to the differing vegetation, herbivores are more abundant in the northern section of the Dinokeng Game Reserve, and in turn, more predators are found in the northern section of the game reserve. Most employees in Dinokeng Game Reserves are local residents living in protected areas and local residents from the communities surrounding the Reserve.

=== Lion conservation ===
There are two wildlife sanctuaries large enough to self-regulate, Kruger National Park and Kgalagadi Park in South Africa. All other reserves such as the Dinokeng game reserve must be managed by people to maintain a predator-prey balance and avoid inbreeding. The Dinokeng game reserve is a member of the Lions Management Forum (LiMF), a community of reserve managers from all over the country who shares management experience, discuss and find a management solution that is suitable for long-term subsistence of lions. Although the Dinokeng game reserve has successfully managed the total number of lions through selective contraception, the reserve must address the existence of too many young males.

At sexual maturity, young males will be driven out of the pride by the dominant male and adult females, becoming nomadic until they oust an older, weaker dominant male from another established pride. Less commonly, the young expelled males adopt permanent nomadic lifestyles, remaining solitary and never assuming a position of dominance within a new pride. However, smaller fenced reserves like Dinokeng do not experience this natural dispersion. Pressure from the dominant male lion has caused young males to try to escape from the reserve. This can cause serious damage to the perimeter of the reserve. At Dinokeng game reserve, managers make decisions based on evidence and apply ethical principles to determine the management scheme for lions. They value the overall ecosystem approach rather than species-specific approaches, consistent with regional and international laws, policies, guidelines and strategies.

==== Fatal lion attacks ====
On 27 February 2018 a young woman, Megan van der Zwan (22), was mauled to death by a lioness that was under the care of Kevin Richardson. Richardson lost track of the lioness when she pursued an impala for some 2 kilometres (1.2 mi), whereupon the lioness attacked the day visitor to the reserve. Wildlife biologist Luke Dollar responded to the killing in an article by National Geographic, stating that "behaviors and programs that skirt the reality of our place in the food chain seem to be an accident waiting to happen." On 13 August 2023, Johannes Matshe (30), an employee of a land owner at Dinokeng, was killed by three lions while navigating the reserve on foot after dark.

=== Cheetah conservation ===
The cheetah is the second most threatened carnivore in South Africa after the African wild dog. They are listed as an endangered species in South Africa. Cheetahs have disappeared from 76% of Africa's historical geographic regions and almost all of Asia's vast historical regions. In the past 13,000 years, cheetahs have been killed because of threats to livestock and human security. Over time, due to crop cultivation and urban development, the cheetah population has been insufficiently spaced. Most importantly, wildlife and humans do not coexist well. One way to deal with this problem is to establish wildlife sanctuaries and isolate humans from animals to ensure the safety of both parties.

The challenge with this solution is the limitation of natural gene flow. Wild cheetahs appear in three locations in South Africa. First, huge reserves, such as Kruger National Park and Kgalagadi, with a large enough gene pool of more than 600 cheetahs in total, so they do not require human intervention and management. Second, in the farmland on the border of Botswana, the free-roaming population is 350–400. Third, there are about 340 scattered cheetahs distributed in 54 reserves including the Dinokeng game reserve. Each protected area has an average of 6 or 7 cheetahs, which means that inbreeding is a problem that needs to be avoided. Therefore, the Dinokeng game reserve is part of the EWT (Endangered Wildlife Trust) Cheetah Metapopulation project. The purpose of the Metapopulation project is to prevent this inbreeding and to ensure the long-term viability of cheetahs in small, fenced reserves, also ensure the long-time genetic and demographic integrity of the collective population.

== Administration ==
Dinokeng Game Reserve is a wildlife area in which tourism and conservation are combined, and it was created through a public-private partnership that required the collaboration of local landowners and the South African government. The Dinokeng project is funded by public funds and managed by the government, but the private landowners retain ownership of the land.

As a part of the municipal spatial planning process, an environmental management framework (EMF) is utilized to promote sustainable development through holistic planning efforts. Regional planning initiatives such as the EMF project and regional space development frameworks contribute to strengthening the planning framework. The EMF process integrates stakeholders from both physical and virtual environments and has a specific goal of creating a self-sustaining tourism economy in the case of Dinokeng Game Reserve. The EMF has established resources and parameters to ensure the sustainable development of various natural activities, which directly or indirectly influence planning decisions related to natural resources.
