= Crocodile River (Limpopo) =

River in South Africa

Crocodile River Afrikaans: Krokodilrivier
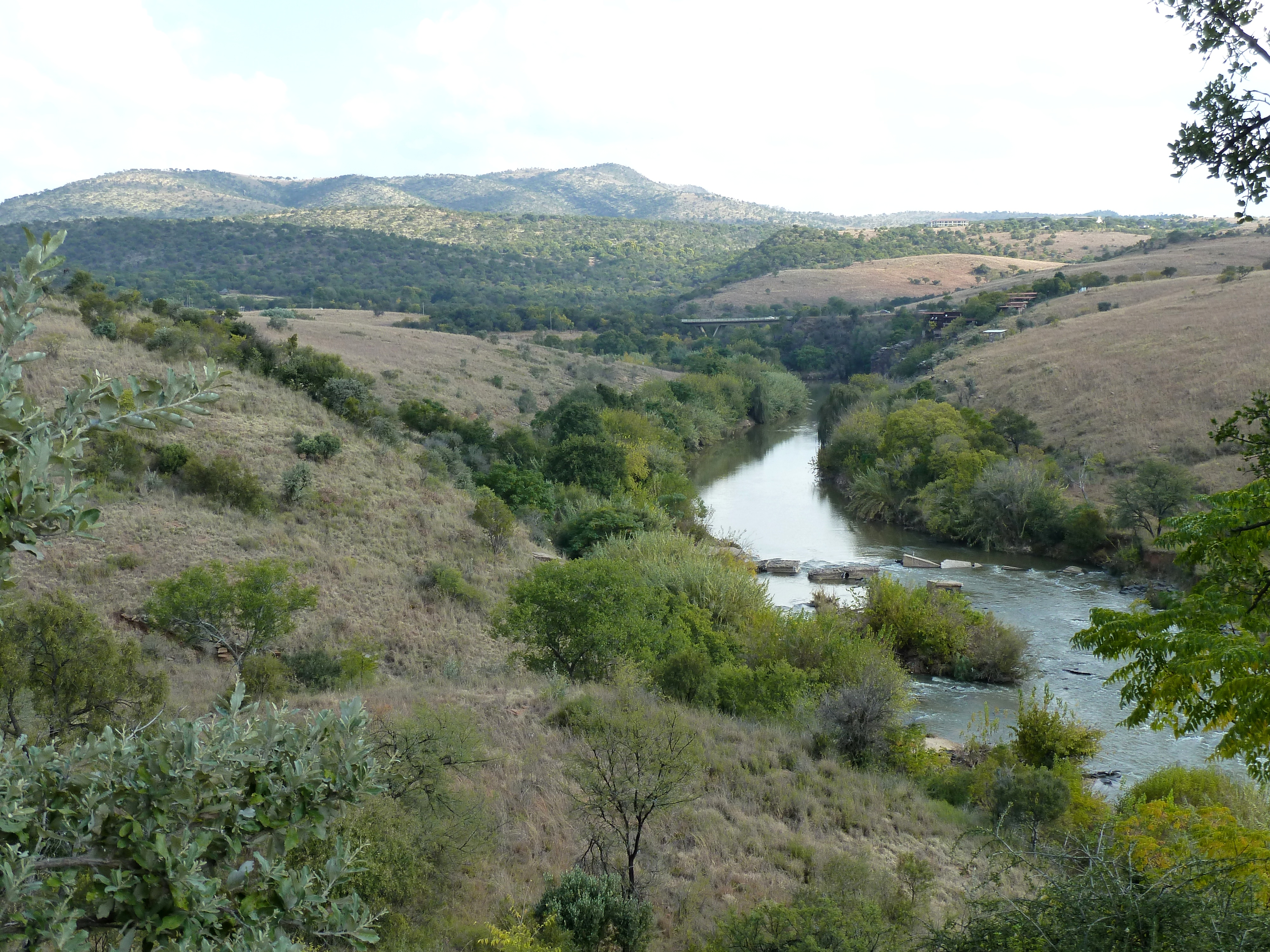
- Crocodile River at Pelindaba, North West

- Location of the Crocodile River's mouth
- Native name: Tswana: Oodi

Location
- Country: South Africa
- Province: Gauteng, North West and Limpopo

Physical characteristics
- Source: Witwatersrand
  - location: Witpoortjie, Gauteng
  - coordinates: 26°07′23″S 27°49′48″E
  - elevation: 1,710 m (5,610 ft)
- Mouth: Limpopo River
  - location: Dwaalboom, Limpopo
  - coordinates: 24°11′27″S 26°52′22″E
  - elevation: 872 m (2,861 ft)
- Length: 423 km (263 mi)
- Basin size: 29,572 km^{2} (11,418 sq mi)

Basin features
- Progression: Limpopo River → Indian Ocean

The Crocodile River (Tswana: Oodi, Afrikaans: Krokodilrivier) is a river in South Africa. At its confluence with the Marico River, the Limpopo River is formed.

== Course ==
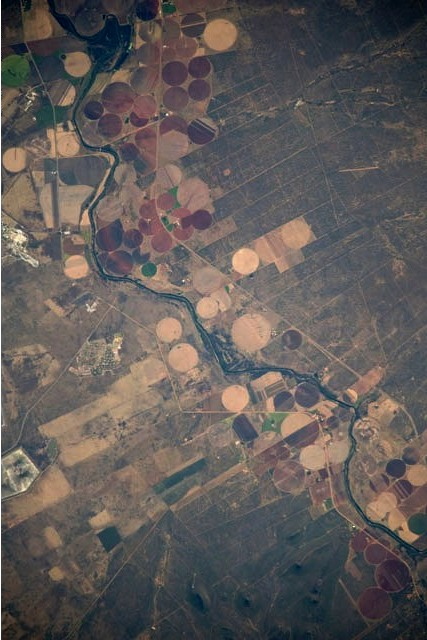
NASA picture of the Crocodile River south of Thabazimbi

The Crocodile River has its source in the Witwatersrand ridge, originating in Constantia Kloof, Roodepoort, Gauteng province. The first dam on the river is the Lake Heritage Dam just west of Lanseria International Airport. Just north of this airport is its confluence with the Jukskei River. Further downstream into the North West province are the Hartbeespoort Dam and the Roodekoppies Dam. Beyond the Hartbeespoort Dam, the stream passes the town of Brits. The Elands River joins downstream from the Vaalkop Dam, about 20 km further the Pienaars River joins its right bank, shortly after exiting the Klipvoor Dam.

In Limpopo province, about 35 km further, the river passes the town of Thabazimbi and meanders for many kilometres through a sparsely inhabited area before joining the Marico River just west of Rooibokkraal at the limit of North West province to form the start of the Limpopo River.

== Tributaries ==
The tributaries of the Crocodile River include the Bloubankspruit, Hennops River, Jukskei River, Magalies River, Sterkstroom River, Rosespruit, Skeerpoort River, Kareespruit, Elands River, Bierspruit River and Sundays River.

== Pollution ==
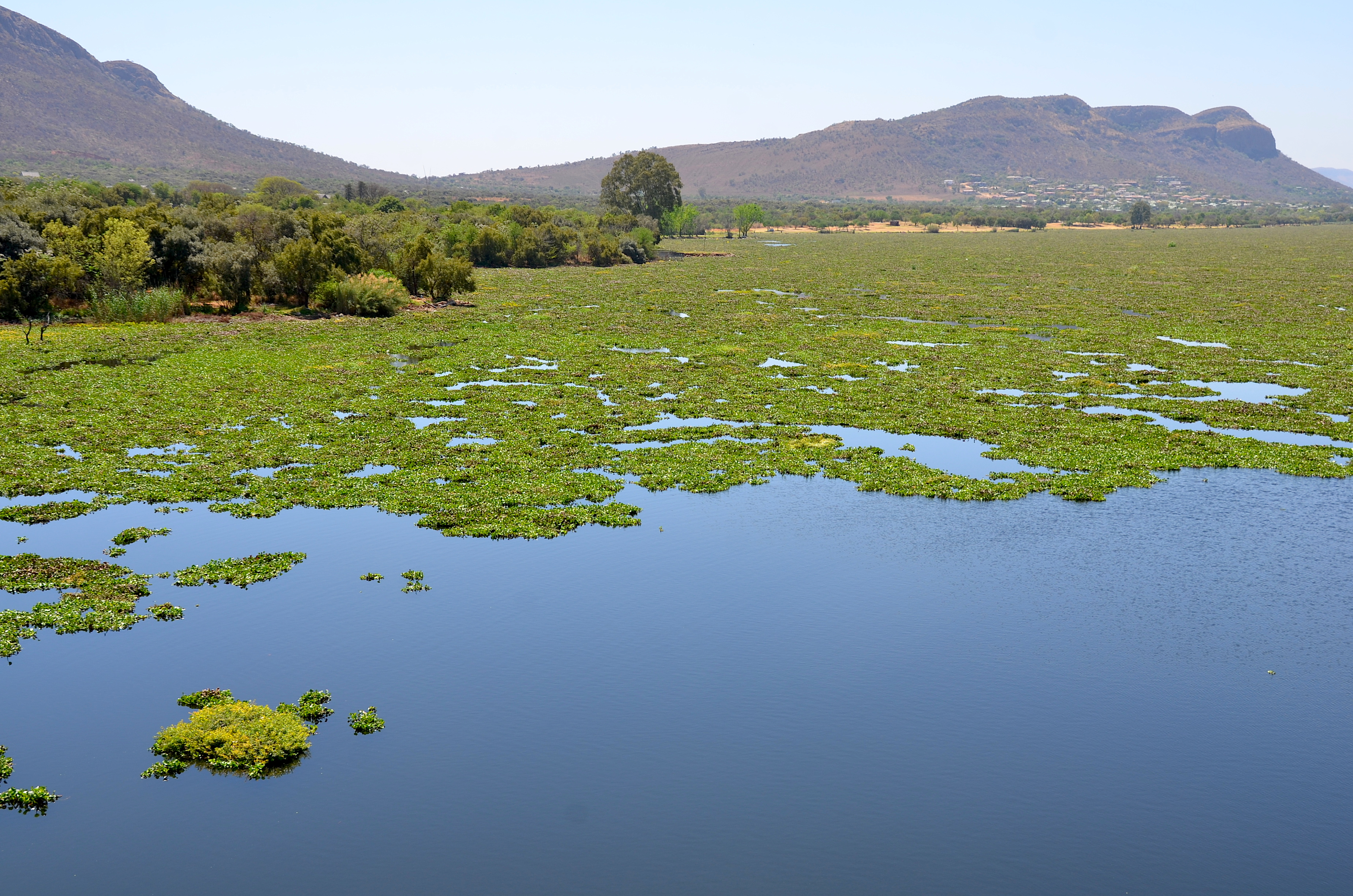
Massive growth of water hyacinth deteriorating the water quality of Hartbeespoort Dam

The Crocodile River is one of the most polluted river systems in South Africa. The effects of pollution from two of South Africa's metropolitan areas, Johannesburg and Tshwane, has been detrimental to the ecology of the system. Untreated industrial, mining, agricultural and household waste has deteriorated the water quality throughout most of its course and led to massive algal blooms in the Hartbeespoort Dam and Roodekoppies Dam. Invasive plant species have negatively affected the integrity of the system. Unsustainable farming practices have led to sediment overloads and erosion further harming the river.

== Dams ==
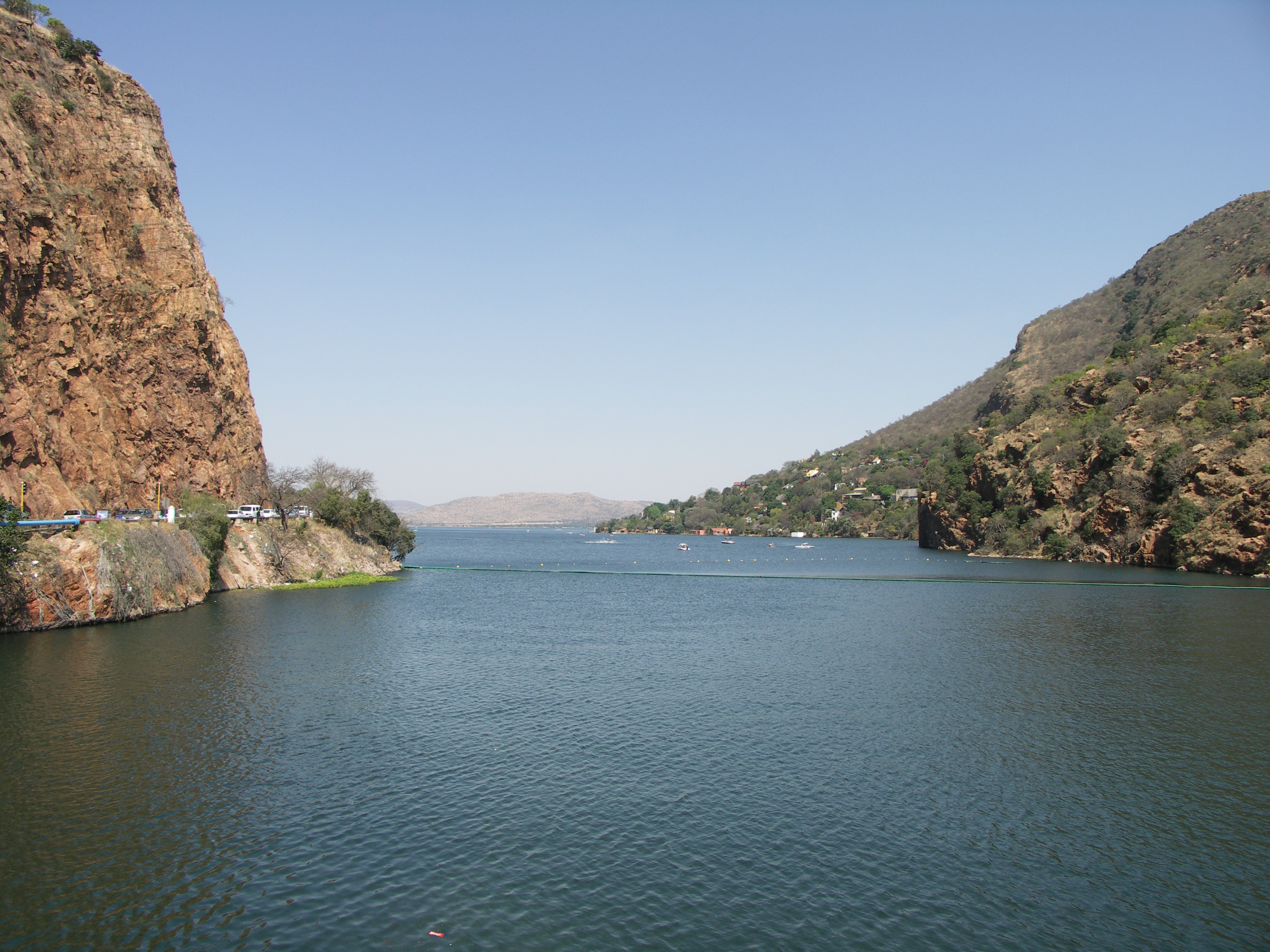
View of the Hartbeespoort Dam

The Crocodile River is part of the Crocodile (West) and Marico Water Management Area. Dams in the river basin are:

- Hartbeespoort Dam
- Roodekoppies Dam
- Rietvlei Dam, in the Rietvlei River
- Bon Accord Dam and Leeukraal Dam, in the Apies River
- Klipvoor Dam and Roodeplaat Dam, in the Pienaars/Moretele River
- Vaalkop Dam, in the Elands River
- Bospoort Dam, in the Hex River (Matshukubjana)

== See also ==
- Drainage basin A
- List of rivers of South Africa
- List of reservoirs and dams in South Africa
