= Marion P. McCrane =

American zoologist and educator (1931–2013)

Marion P. McCrane (1931–2013) was an American zoologist and educator.

A native of Philadelphia, she attended the University of Pennsylvania, where she majored in zoology. She was a traveling lecturer for the New York Zoological Park and in the 1950s she lectured to over 30,000 school children a year in the New York City area. She referred to herself as the "Zoo Lady" when speaking to school and wanted to stimulate children's interest in zoology.

McCrane later became the head of the Information and Education Division at the National Zoological Park in Washington, D.C., from 1962 through December 1968. During this time, she focused particular on caring for baby animals. In 1964, she found a newborn two-toed sloth abandoned in a zoo enclosure and took it to the zoo hospital to nurse it to health. She ended up caring for the baby sloth for more than eight months, the first known example of a person successfully hand rearing a two-toed sloth. McCrane rigorously documented her experience as well as her observations for the benefit of science. The study that came out of her experience was titled "Behavior and Development of a Hand-Reared Two-Toed Sloth (choloepus didactylus)" and published in International Zoo Yearbook, Volume 6, London Zoological Society.

McCrane was a member of the Anteaters Association. In addition to her work in the US, in 1965, McCrane brought a pygmy hippopotamus and four white-tailed deer to the National Zoological Gardens in Pretoria, South Africa as part of an animal exchange. McCrane returned to the US with two aardwolves, a serval, caracal, black-footed cats, flightless rails, a Meyer's parrot, and Cape parrot.
