= Borakalalo Game Reserve =

- Location within North West (South African province)
- Location: North West Province, South Africa
- Nearest city: Moretele Local Municipality
- Coordinates: 25°10′S 27°50′E
- Area: 130 km^{2} (50 sq mi)

The Borakalalo Game Reserve is a protected area in North West Province, South Africa. It is located about 80 km (50 mi) north-northwest of Pretoria and 60 km (37 mi) north of Brits. This majestic Nature reserve has unfortunately been hampered by numerous safety problems, especially affecting overnight visitors to the reserve. Also known as a fantastic birding destination with specials including African Finfoot, Meyer's Parrot and Grey-Headed Kingfisher.

== Characteristics ==
The reserve covers an area of about 130 km^{2} (50 sq mi). The protected area is situated around the Klipvoor Dam and the Moretele River. The park consists of woodland and open bushveld vegetation.

The nearest bank is at Letlhabile, about 45 km (28 mi) south of the Reserve. There is a shop at the gate of the park selling basic goods. There are also good fishing spots in the park area, mainly in the Klipvoor Dam.

== Mammals ==
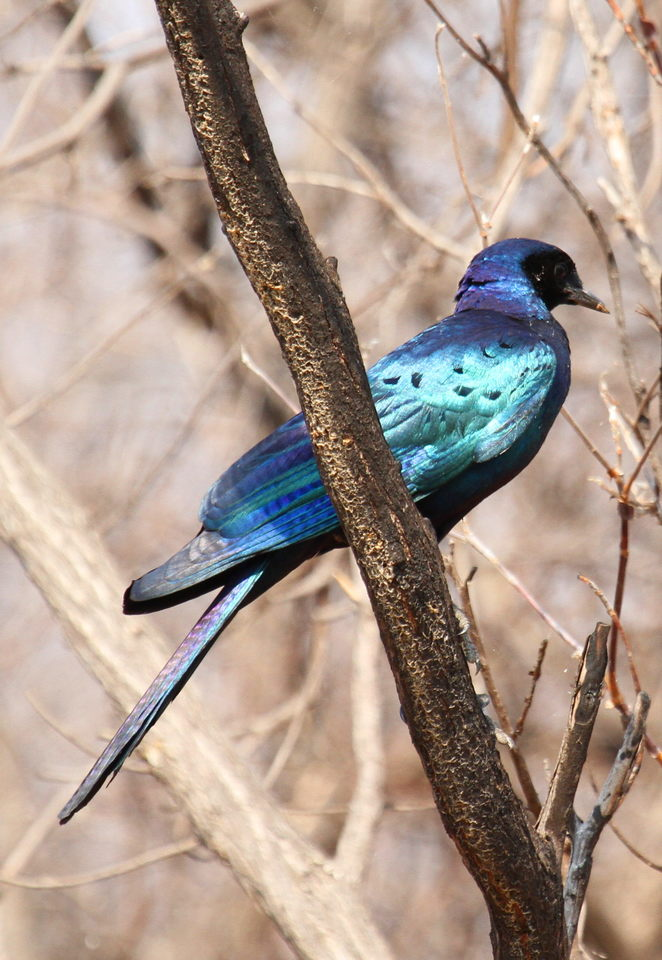
Burchell's starling

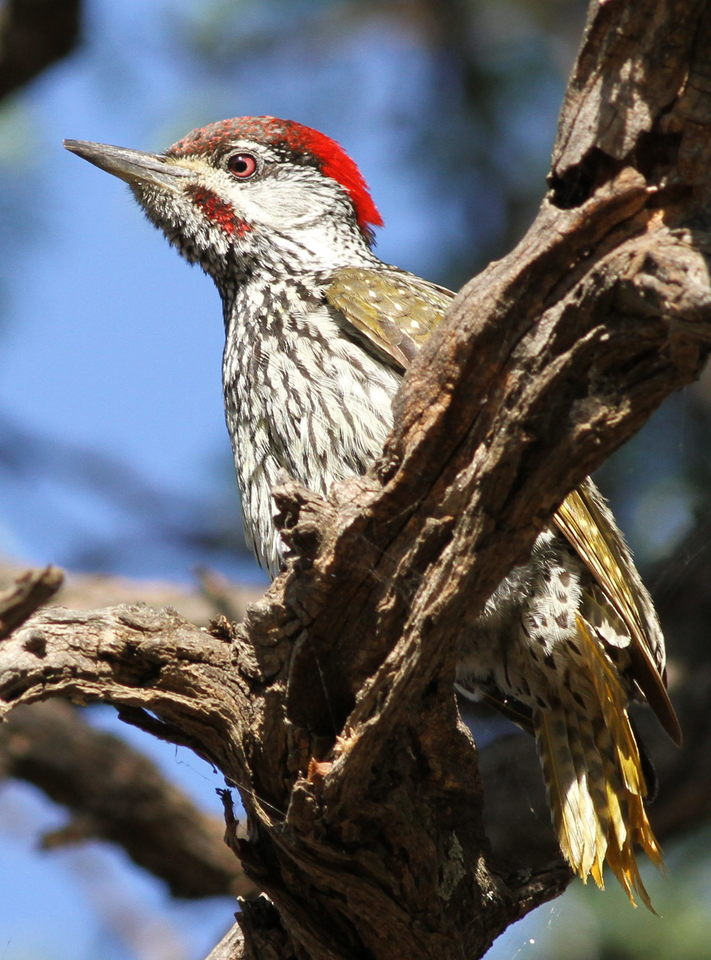
Golden-tailed woodpecker

A large number of mammal species are present in the reserve, among others the following deserve mention:

- Aardwolf
- Black-backed jackal
- Blesbok
- Blue wildebeest
- Brown hyena
- Cape Buffalo
- Cape fox
- Caracal
- Common Reedbuck
- Eland
- Gemsbok
- Giraffe
- Impala
- Hippopotamus
- Kudu
- Leopard
- Mountain reedbuck
- Nyala
- Red hartebeest
- Roan antelope
- Sable antelope
- Tsessebe
- Warthog
- Waterbuck
- Zebra

In addition to the mammals, over 350 species of bird have been recorded in the park. These include eagles and other birds of prey.
