= Roodekoppies Dam =

- Interactive map of Roodekoppies Dam
- Official name: Roodekoppies Dam
- Location: North West, South Africa
- Coordinates: 25°24′15″S 27°35′29″E
- Opening date: 1986
- Operators: Department of Water Affairs and Forestry

Dam and spillways
- Type of dam: concrete gravity
- Impounds: Crocodile River
- Height: 25 metres (82 ft)
- Length: 3,910 metres (12,830 ft)

Reservoir
- Creates: Roodekoppies Dam Reservoir
- Total capacity: 103,000,000 cubic metres (3.6×10^{9} cu ft)
- Catchment area: 6 120 km^{2}
- Surface area: 1,571 hectares (3,880 acres)

Roodekoppies Dam is a concrete gravity type dam located on the Crocodile River near Brits, North West, South Africa. It was established in 1986 and serves mainly for irrigation purposes and domestic and industrial use. The hazard potential of the dam has been ranked high (3).

== See also ==
- List of reservoirs and dams in South Africa
- List of rivers of South Africa
