= Klipvoor Dam =

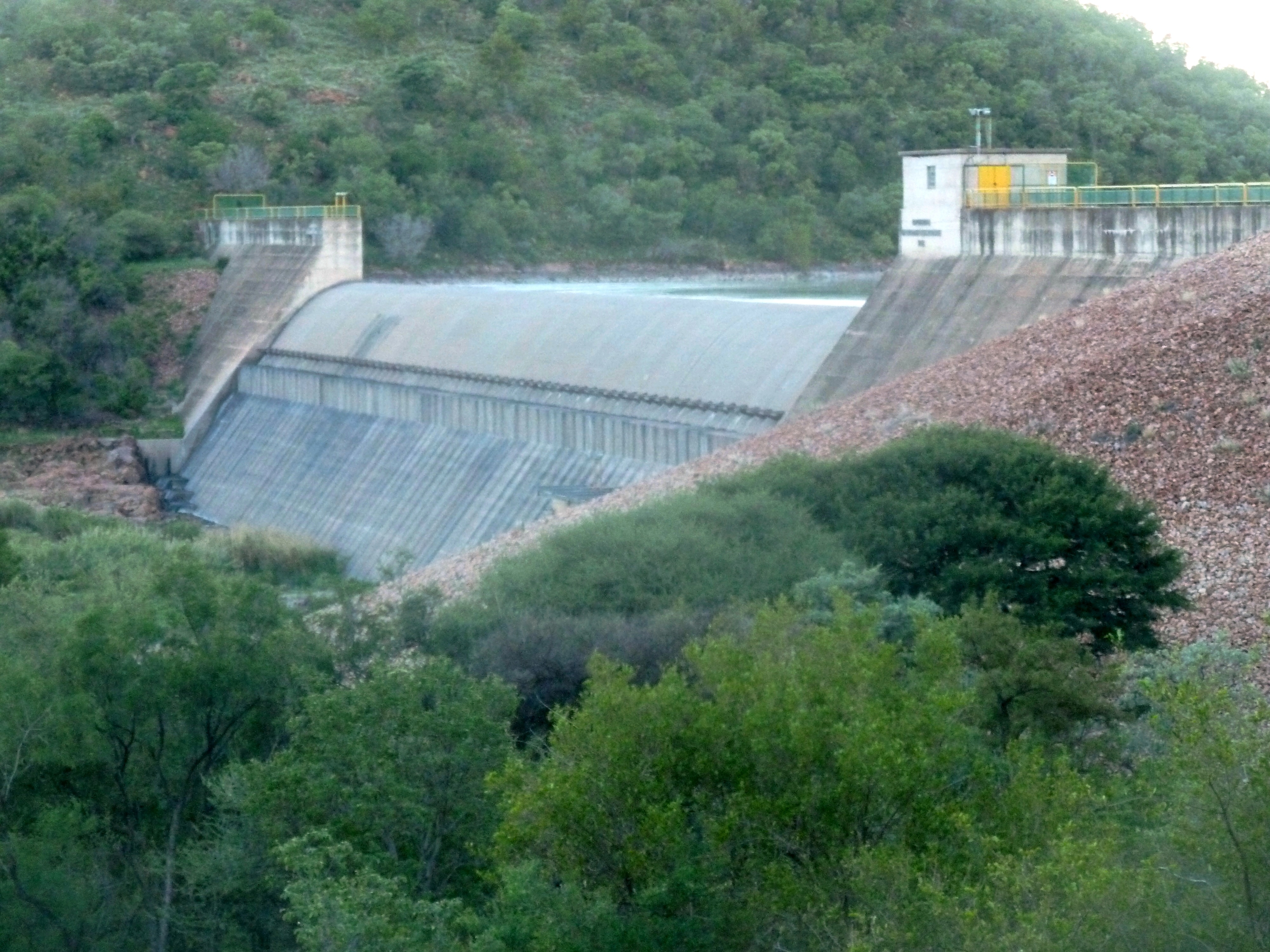
- Interactive map of Klipvoor Dam
- Official name: Klipvoor Dam
- Country: South Africa
- Location: North of Brits, North West
- Coordinates: 25°7′58″S 27°48′30″E
- Purpose: Irrigation
- Opening date: 1970
- Owner: Department of Water Affairs

Dam and spillways
- Type of dam: Gravity dam
- Impounds: Moretele River
- Height: 29 m
- Length: 475 m

Reservoir
- Creates: Klipvoor Dam Reservoir
- Total capacity: 47 000 000 m^{3}
- Catchment area: 6 128 km^{2}
- Surface area: 685 ha

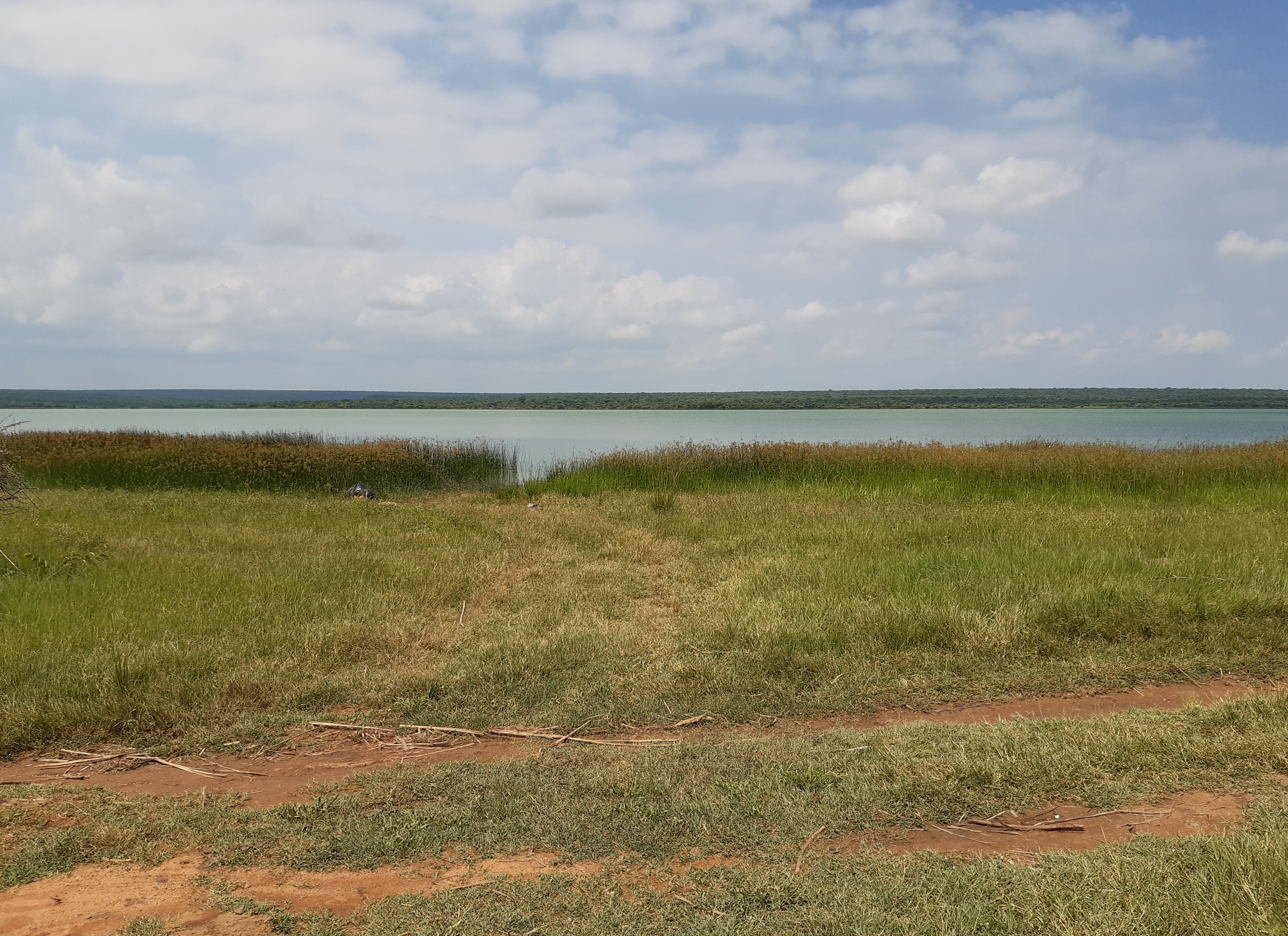
Shores of Klipvoor Dam

Klipvoor Dam is a concrete gravity type dam located on the Moretele River, 55 km north of Brits, North West, South Africa. It was established in 1970. The main purpose of the dam is to serve for irrigation and its hazard potential has been ranked as high (3).

The Klipvoor Dam is one of the good fishing spots of the Borakalalo Game Reserve, located north of the dam.

== See also ==
- List of reservoirs and dams in South Africa
- List of rivers of South Africa
