= Pienaars River =

River in South Africa

Pienaars River Moretele River
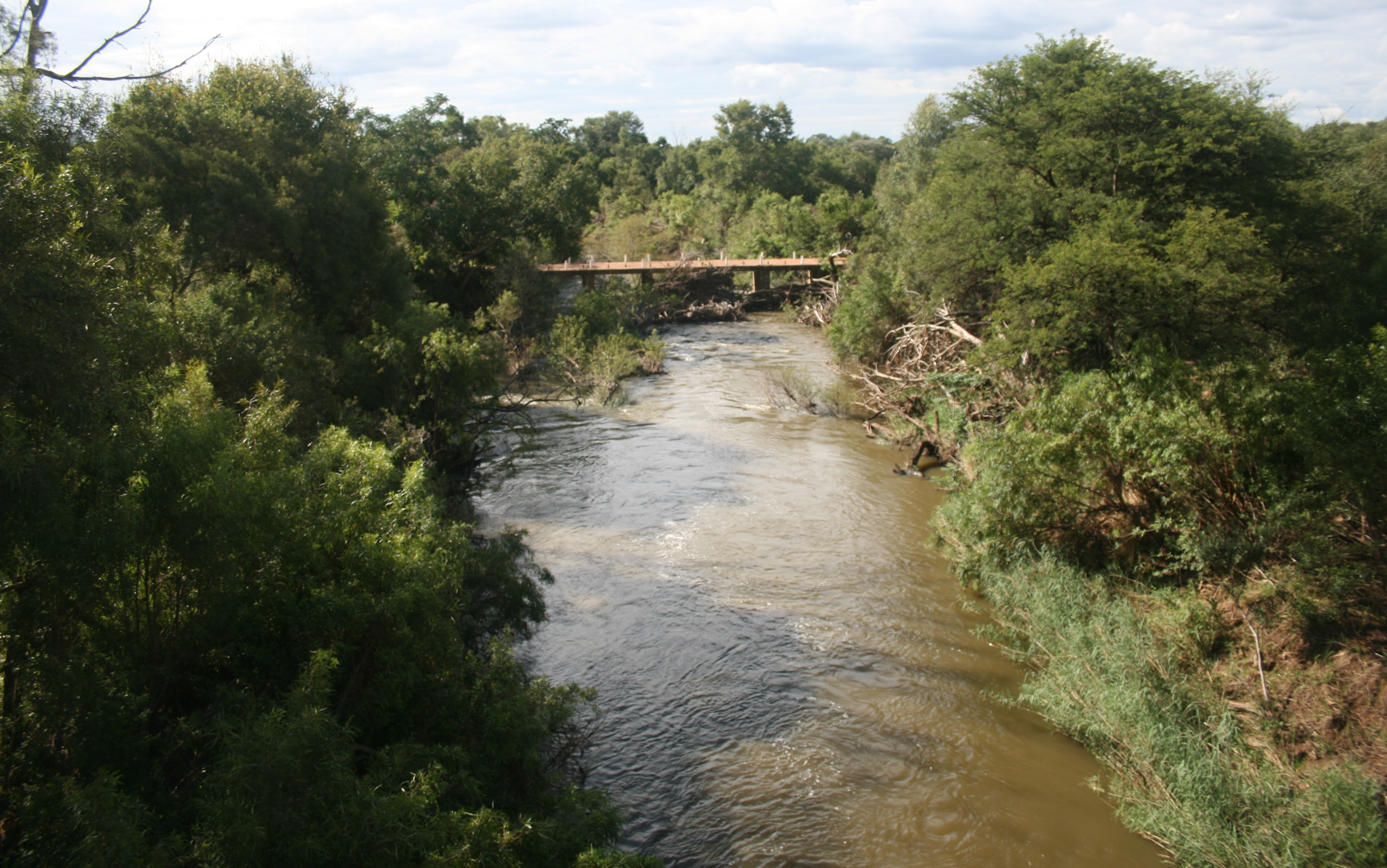
- View downstream from the bridge in the R724 route in Dinokeng Game Reserve, Gauteng

- Location of the Pienaars River mouth

Location
- Country: South Africa
- Province: Gauteng

Physical characteristics
- Source
  - location: East of Pretoria
- Mouth: Crocodile River
  - coordinates: 25°6′4″S 27°33′50″E
  - elevation: 955 m (3,133 ft)

The Pienaars River is a river in South Africa. It is a tributary of the Crocodile River. A short section of this river is known as the Moretele River (i.e. approximately 20 km section between Haakdoornbult and the Klipvoor Dam). Tributaries of the Pienaars River include the Moreletaspruit (alternative spellings: Morelettaspruit, Moreleta Spruit). Note that the above-mentioned Moretele river section is 60 km away from the Moreletaspruit and these two should not be confused with one another.

== Course ==
It originates east of Pretoria, City of Tshwane, Gauteng Province, flowing northwards into Roodeplaat Dam (north of Mamelodi), which is also fed by the Hartbeesspruit and its tributary, the Moreletaspruit. The semi-stagnant water here and below the dam wall harbours quantities of cyanobacteria and its algal blooms. The river continues its northward course through the Dinokeng Game Reserve, where it is joined by the Boekenhoutspruit from the east, before passing under the N1 and turning westward towards Pienaarsrivier, the eponymous hamlet on its right bank, and Zaagkuilsdrift. North of Makapanstad the Apies River (or rather a short section of the Tshwane River) joins it from the south, besides the Plat River (or Utsane) from the east. The Pienaars continues westward and is joined by the Soutpanspruit at Kgomo kgomo before it enters Klipvoor Dam. About 25 km further downstream it joins the Crocodile River's right bank.

== Gallery ==
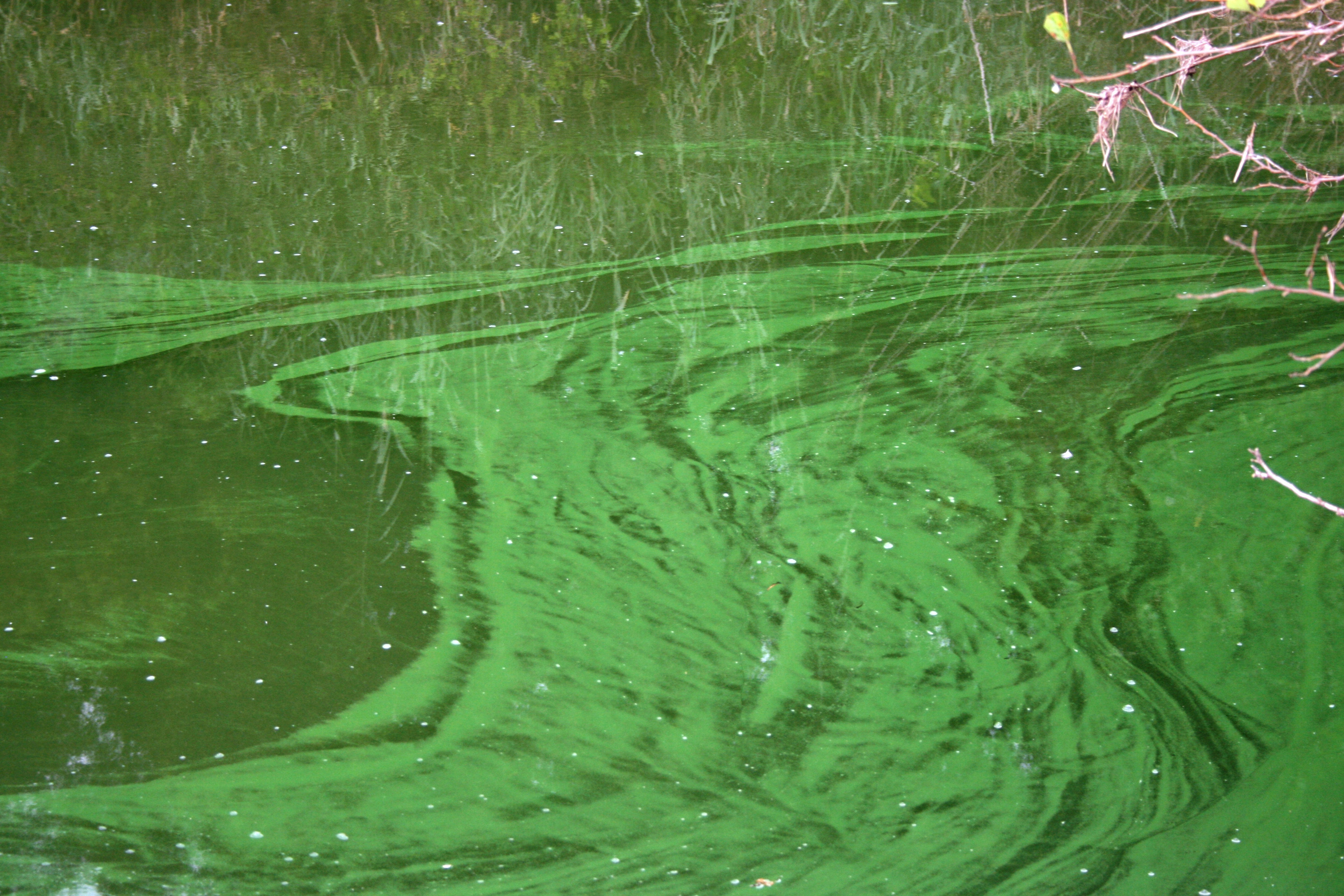
Algal bloom of cyanobacteria in the polluted upper reaches at Buffelsdrift

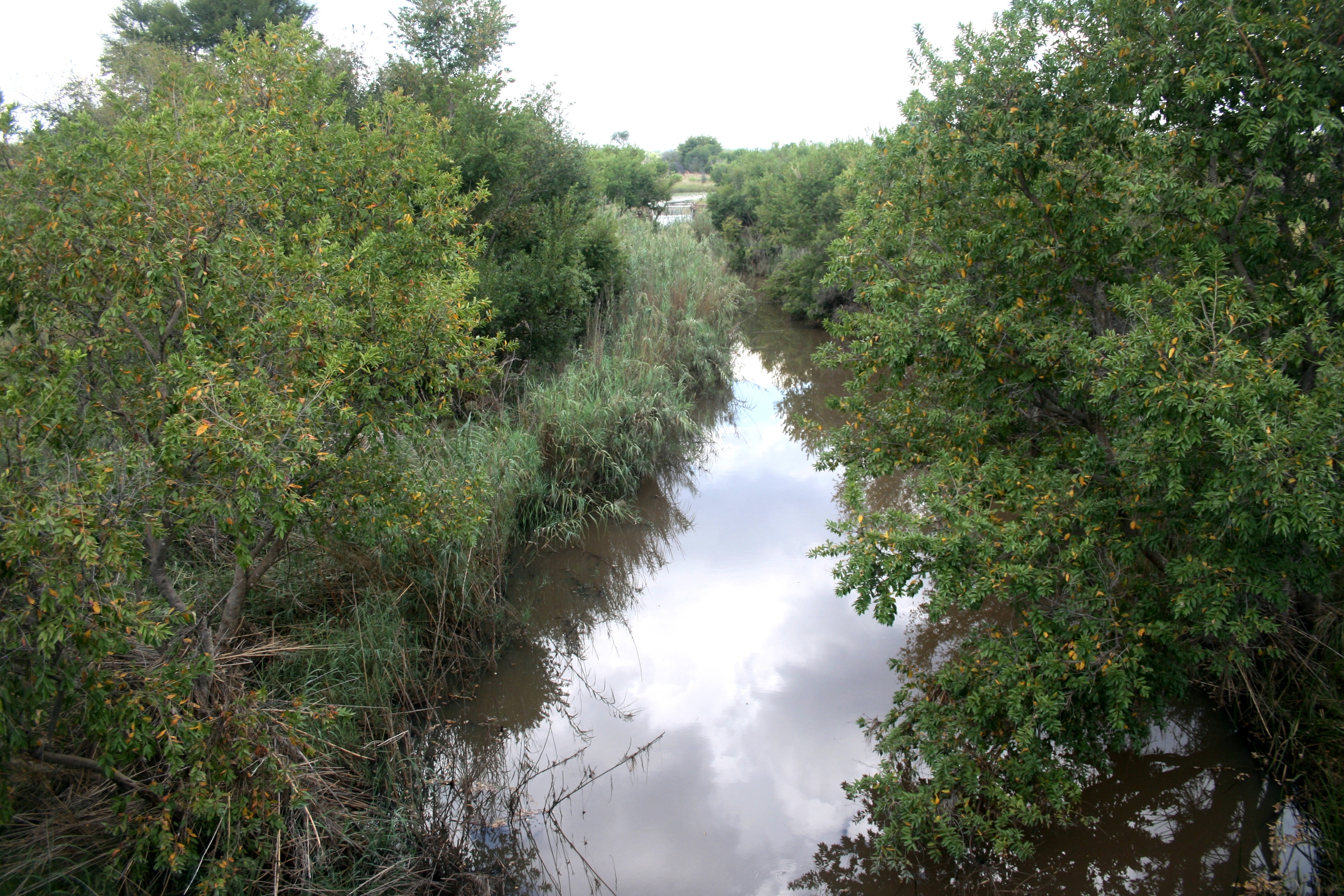
The Boekenhoutspruit, seen here at Dinokeng, is a right bank tributary

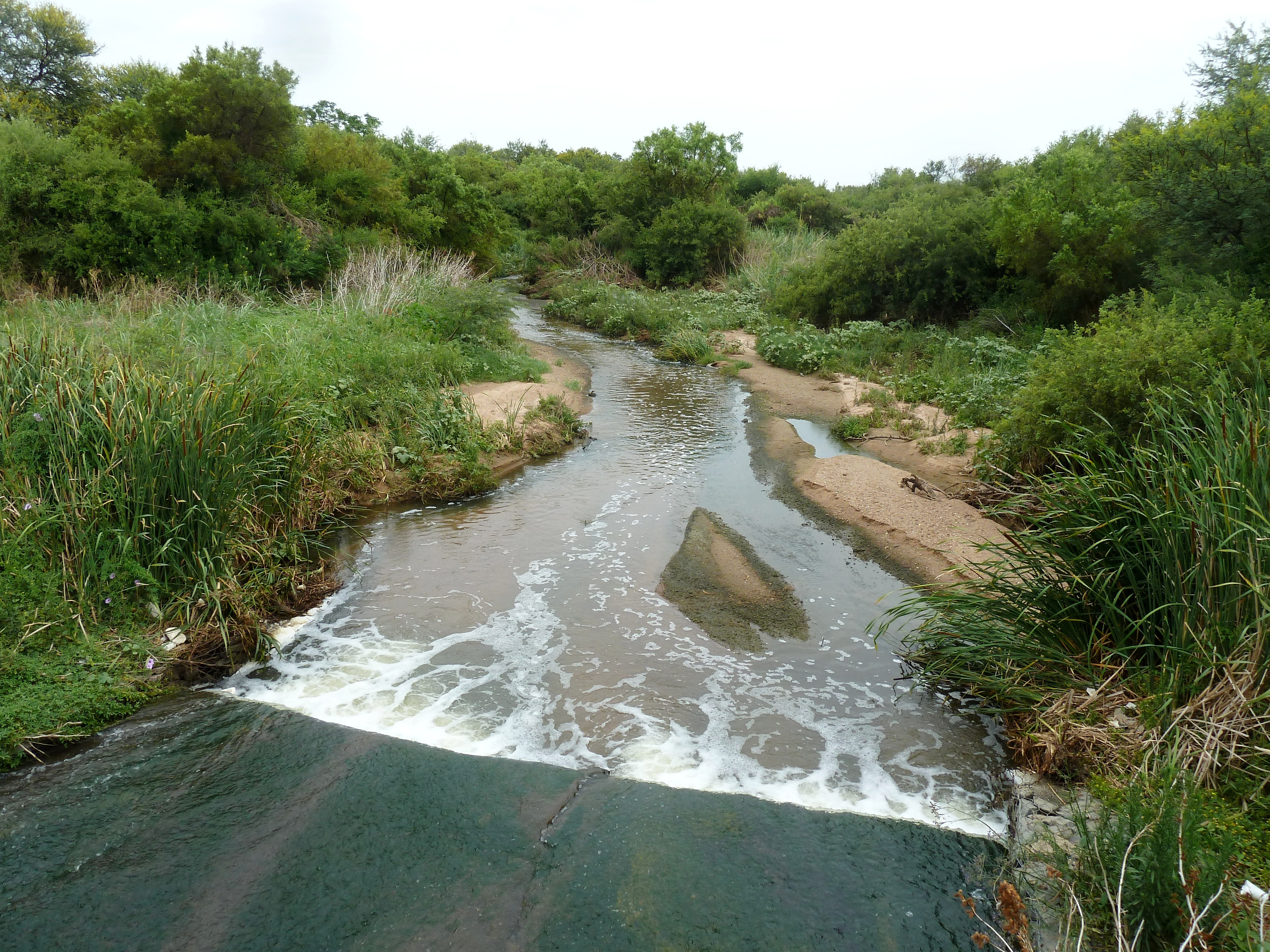
The Soutpanspruit, seen here at Tswaing, is a left bank tributary

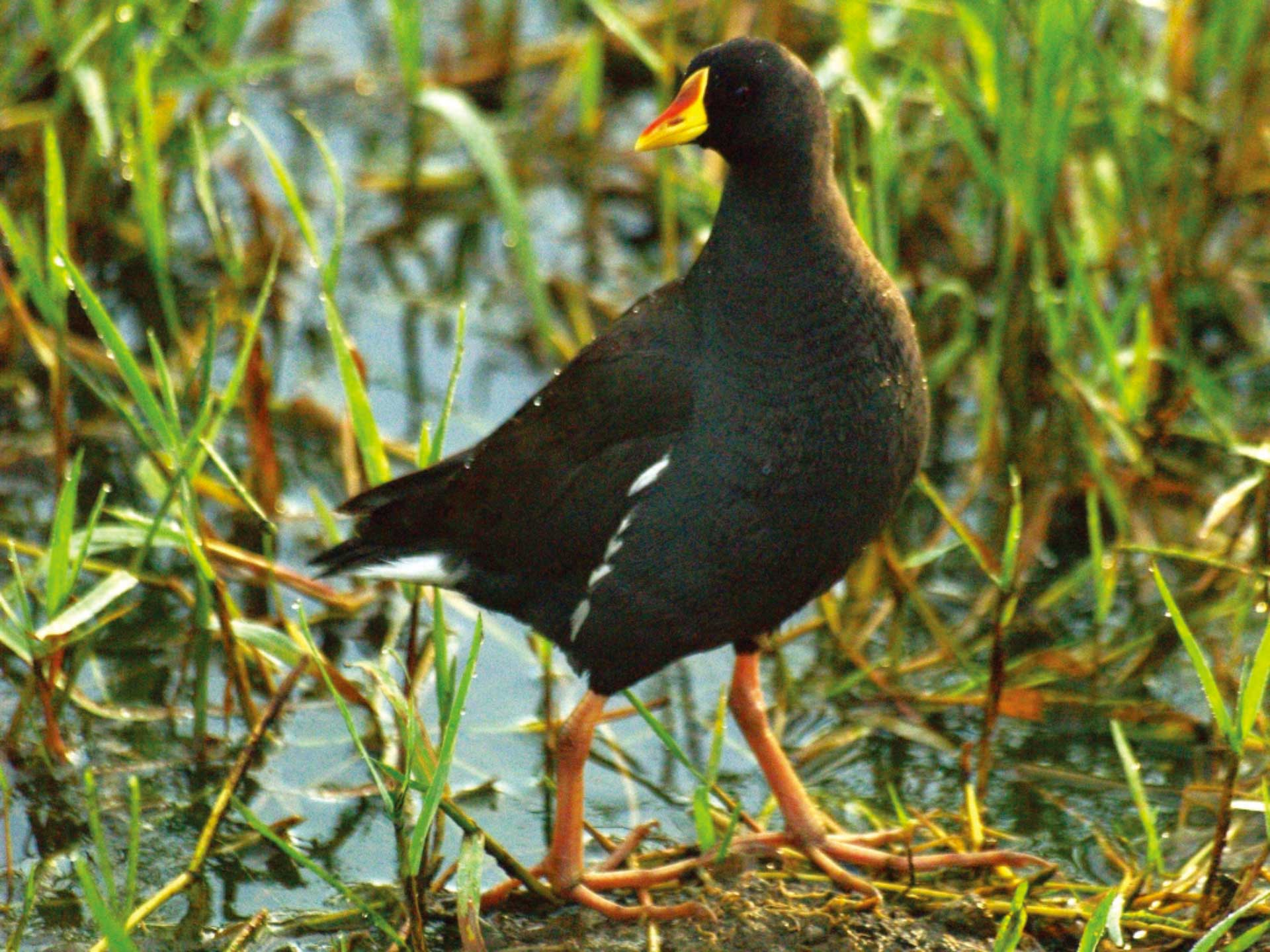
The Kgomo kgomo floodplain attracts seasonal waterbirds

== Dams in the Pienaars River ==
- Waterlake Farm Dam
- Roodeplaat Dam
- Klipvoor Dam
