= Apies River =

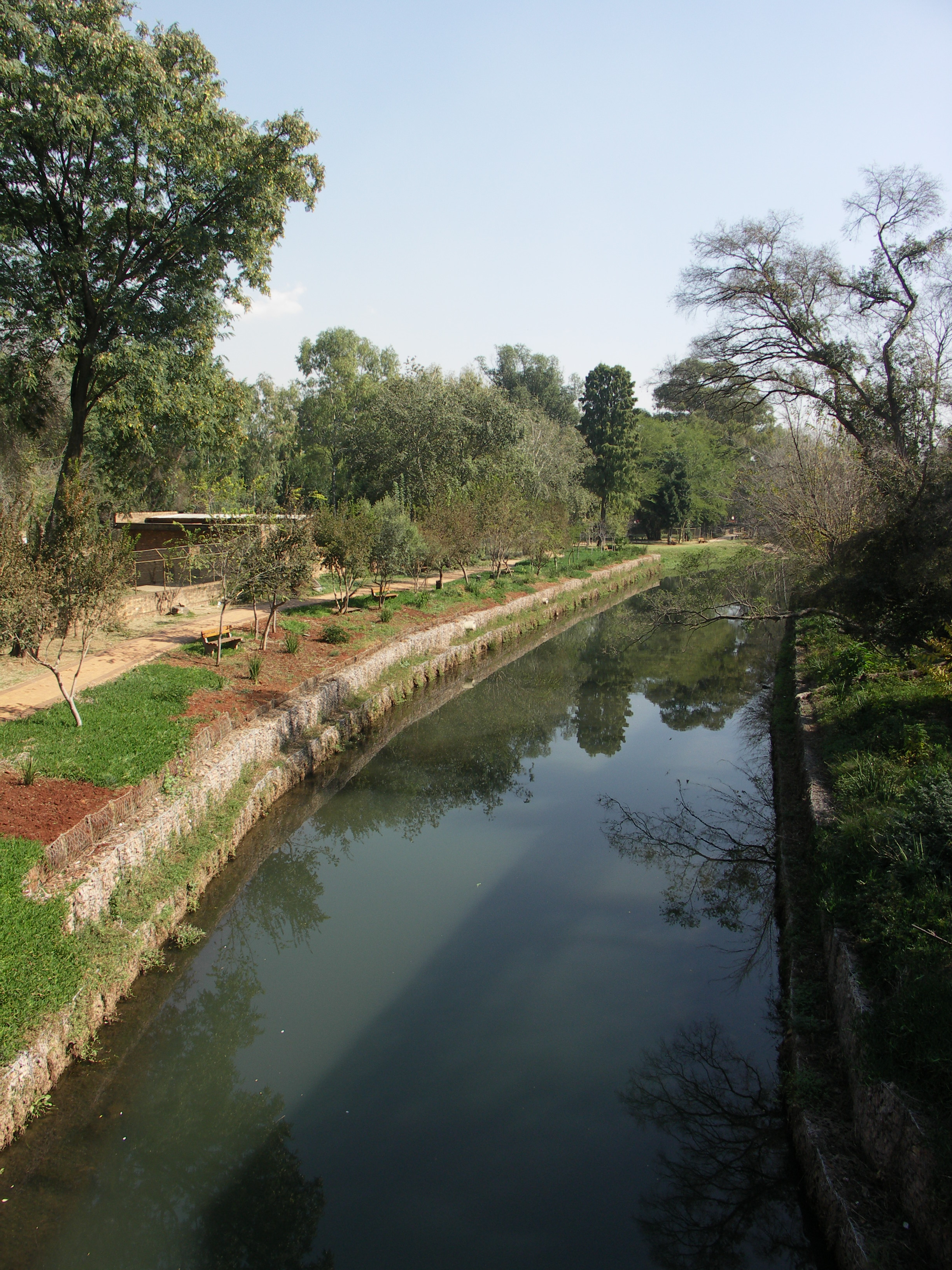
- The Apies River where it intersects the National Zoological Gardens of South Africa in Pretoria; 25°44′00″S 28°11′05″E

- Location within South Africa

Location
- Country: South Africa
- Province: Gauteng

Physical characteristics
- Source
  - location: Pretoria, Gauteng, South Africa
- Mouth: Pienaars River
  - location: Gauteng, South Africa
  - coordinates: 25°10′25″S 28°06′38″E

Basin features
- River system: Pienaars River
- Tributaries
  - right: Walker Spruit

The Apies River is a river that flows through the city of Pretoria, South Africa. Its source is located just south of the city (south of Erasmus Park) and it flows northward until it drains into the Pienaars River.

The word "Apies" is Afrikaans for small monkeys and is a reference to the historical abundance of vervet monkeys on the Apies River banks.

Nguni-speaking people, who became known as the Ndebele, are thought to have been the first people to recognise the suitability of the Apies River valley as a place to put down roots. The Ndebele encountered indigenous nomadic Khoisan people, which they called abaTshwa (the People who are Ignored), occupying the area. The Ndebele named the river 'Tshwane' which means 'Place of the abaTshwa'. It is also argued that they named the river after one of their chiefs "Tshwane" who is reputedly buried under the Wonderboom. It is also proposed that 'Tshwane' is a corruption of 'tshwene' which is the Sotho and Tswana word for monkey. However, the river is still recognized under its colonial name "Apies". The greater municipality of Pretoria is now known as Tshwane Metropolitan Municipality. The river is - to a large extent - canalised with little resemblance of the natural river reach of the past. The river reach between Wonderboom Poort and the Bon Accord Dam is, however, not canalised.

The Mamelodi township draws its name from the name of the river, with the full name being "Mamelodi ya Tshwane", meaning "Whistler of the Apies River", a nickname given to Paul Kruger.

== Dams ==
- Bon Accord Dam
- Leeukraal Dam

== See also ==
- List of rivers of South Africa
- List of reservoirs and dams in South Africa
