= Roodeplaat Dam =

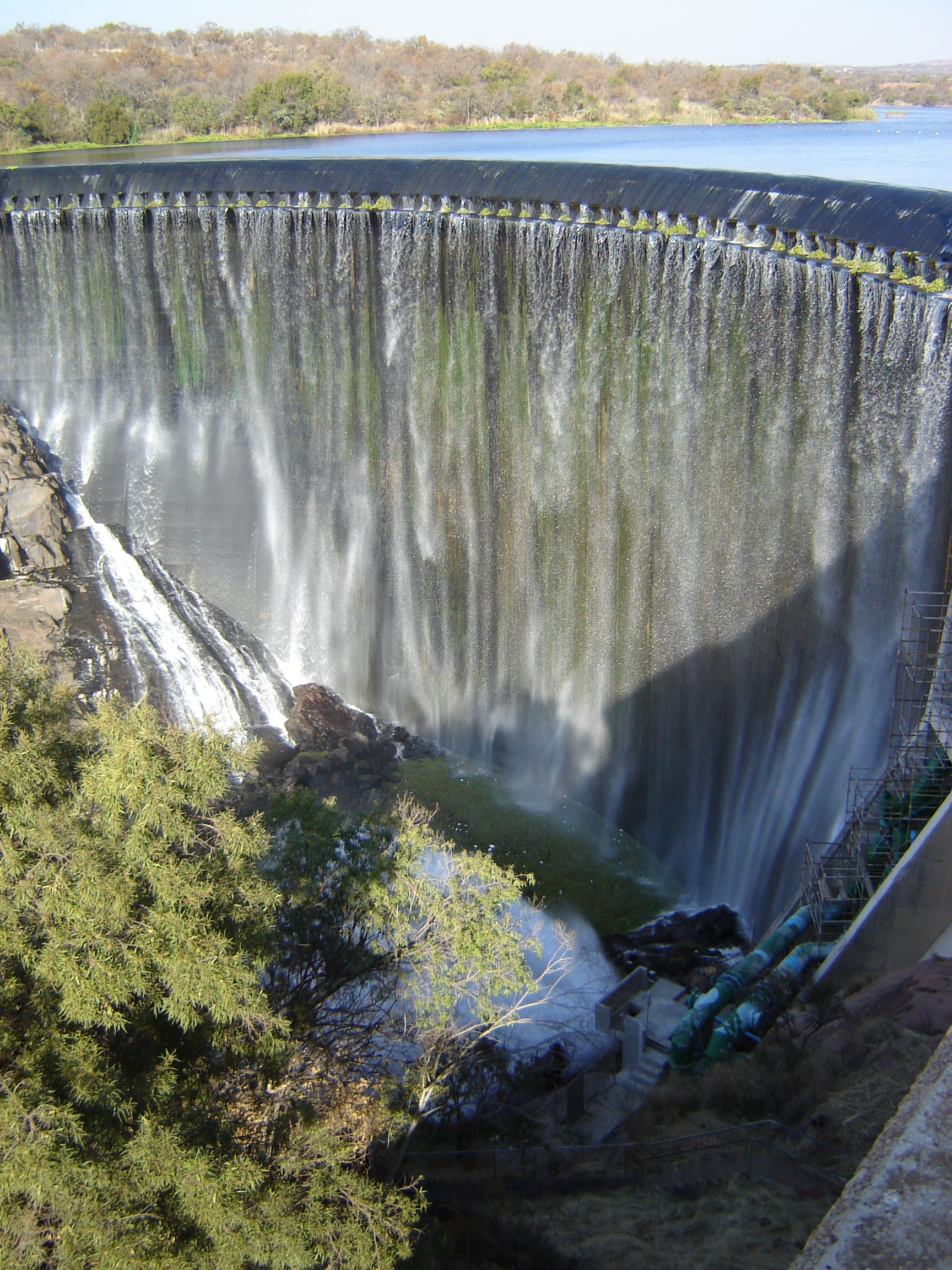
- Roodeplaat Dam wall in 2005, during an upgrade to the offtake structure.

- Location within South Africa
- Official name: Roodeplaat Dam
- Country: South Africa
- Location: Near Pretoria, Gauteng
- Coordinates: 25.62083°S 28.37138°E
- Purpose: Irrigation
- Construction began: 1955
- Opening date: 1959
- Owner: Department of Water Affairs

Dam and spillways
- Type of dam: Arch dam
- Impounds: Pienaars River
- Height: 55 m (180 ft)
- Length: 351 m (1,152 ft)

Reservoir
- Creates: Roodeplaat Dam Reservoir
- Total capacity: 43 472 000 m^{3}
- Catchment area: 684 km^{2}
- Surface area: 403 ha

Roodeplaat Dam is a concrete arch dam situated in South Africa on the Pienaars River (also known along parts of its length as the Moretele River and Moreleta Spruit), a tributary of the Crocodile River, which flows northwards into the Limpopo River. The dam is a warm monomictic impoundment with stable thermal stratification during the summer.

== Use ==
Roodeplaat Dam was originally an irrigation dam, and soon became popular for recreation. Later it became an important source for Magalies Water, a state-owned water board that supplies potable water to a large area north of Pretoria. The hazard potential of the dam has been ranked high.

== Water quality ==
Roodeplaat Dam's catchment contains a large part of the rapidly expanding municipality of Tshwane, which includes Pretoria. Two sewage treatment works feed treated effluent to the dam, resulting in highly eutrophic conditions comparable with those experienced in Hartbeespoort Dam. These conditions were already apparent in the mid-1970s and have not improved. Consequences of eutrophication include blooms of algae and cyanobacteria, and dense mats of water hyacinth (Eichhornia crassipes).

The Department of Water Affairs' Resource Quality Information Services directorate is housed on the banks of Roodeplaat Dam, near the wall. This section is responsible for national monitoring of the surface water resources of South Africa.

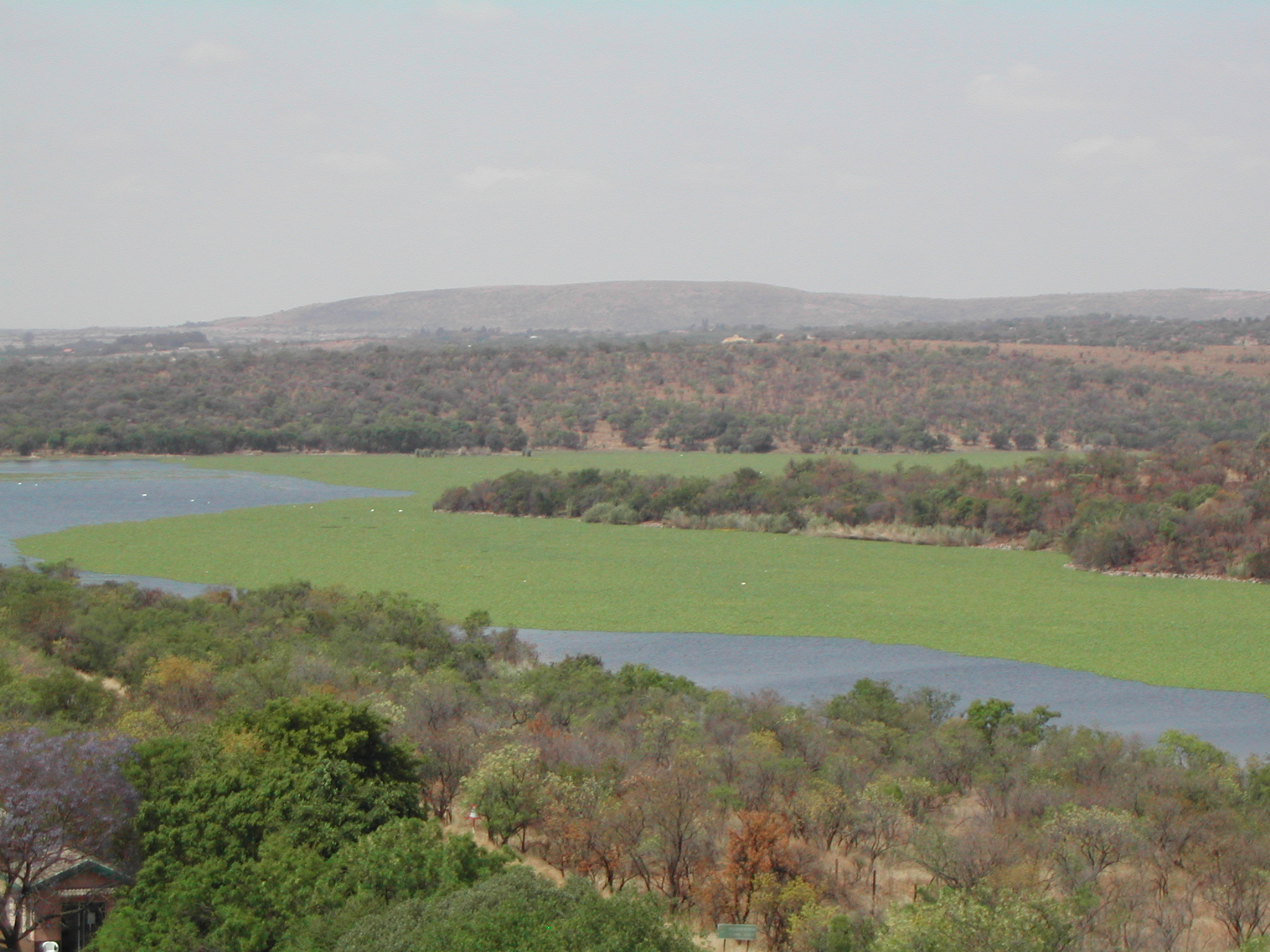

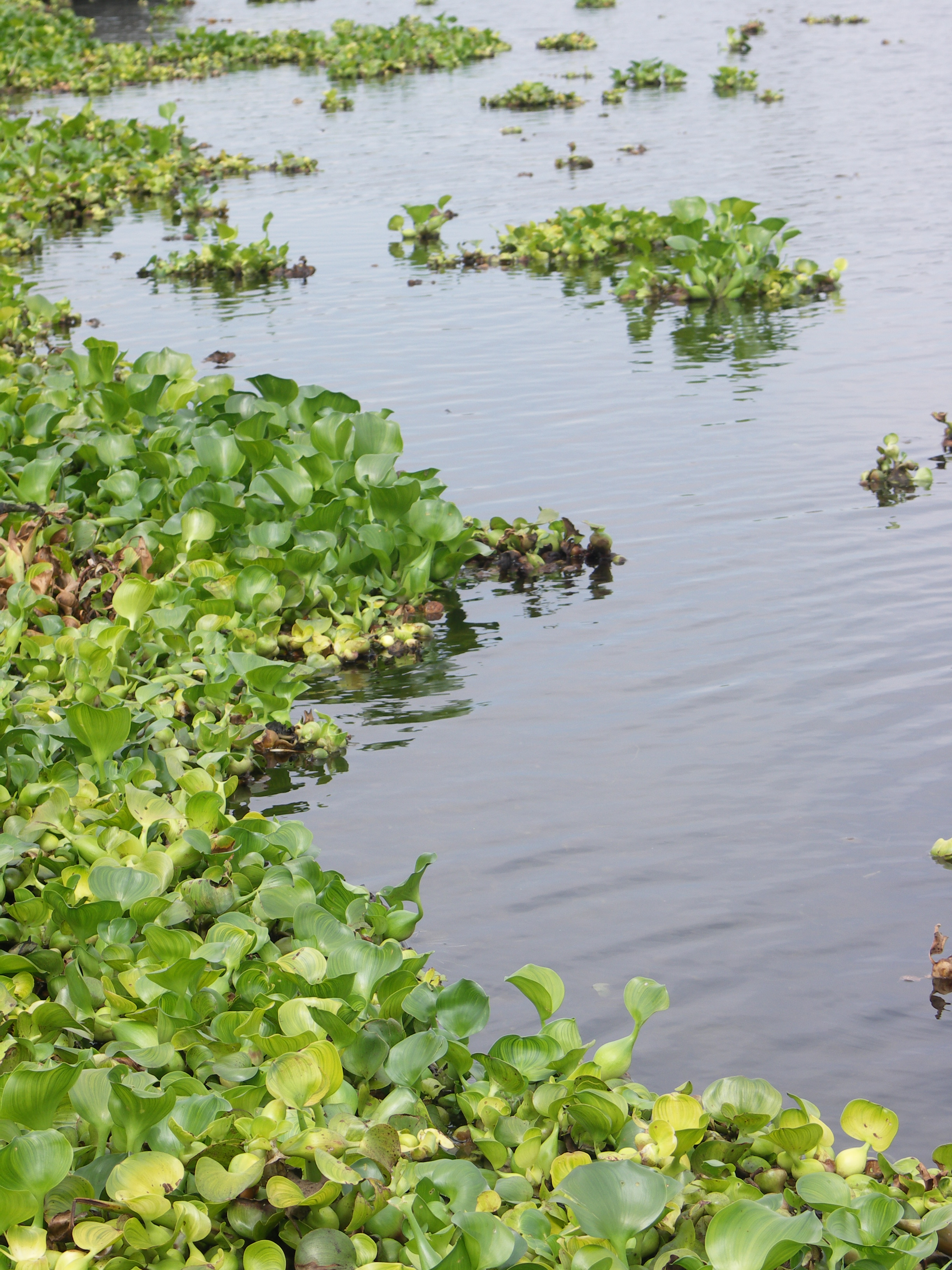

== See also ==
- List of dams and reservoirs in South Africa
