= Blue IQ =

South African initiative

Blue IQ is a multi-billion rand initiative to develop economic infrastructure for specific major projects in the technology sector, high value-added manufacturing and tourism.

Set up by the Gauteng Provincial Government in South Africa, Blue IQ partners with business and government departments to promote strategic private sector investment in key growth sectors of the regional economy.

Its aims are to establish a significantly higher economic growth in the Gauteng Province and to shift the mix of Gross Geographic Product (GGP) towards these sunrise industries that is technology, manufacturing and tourism.
