= Pretoria Zoo =

National Zoological Garden of South Africa

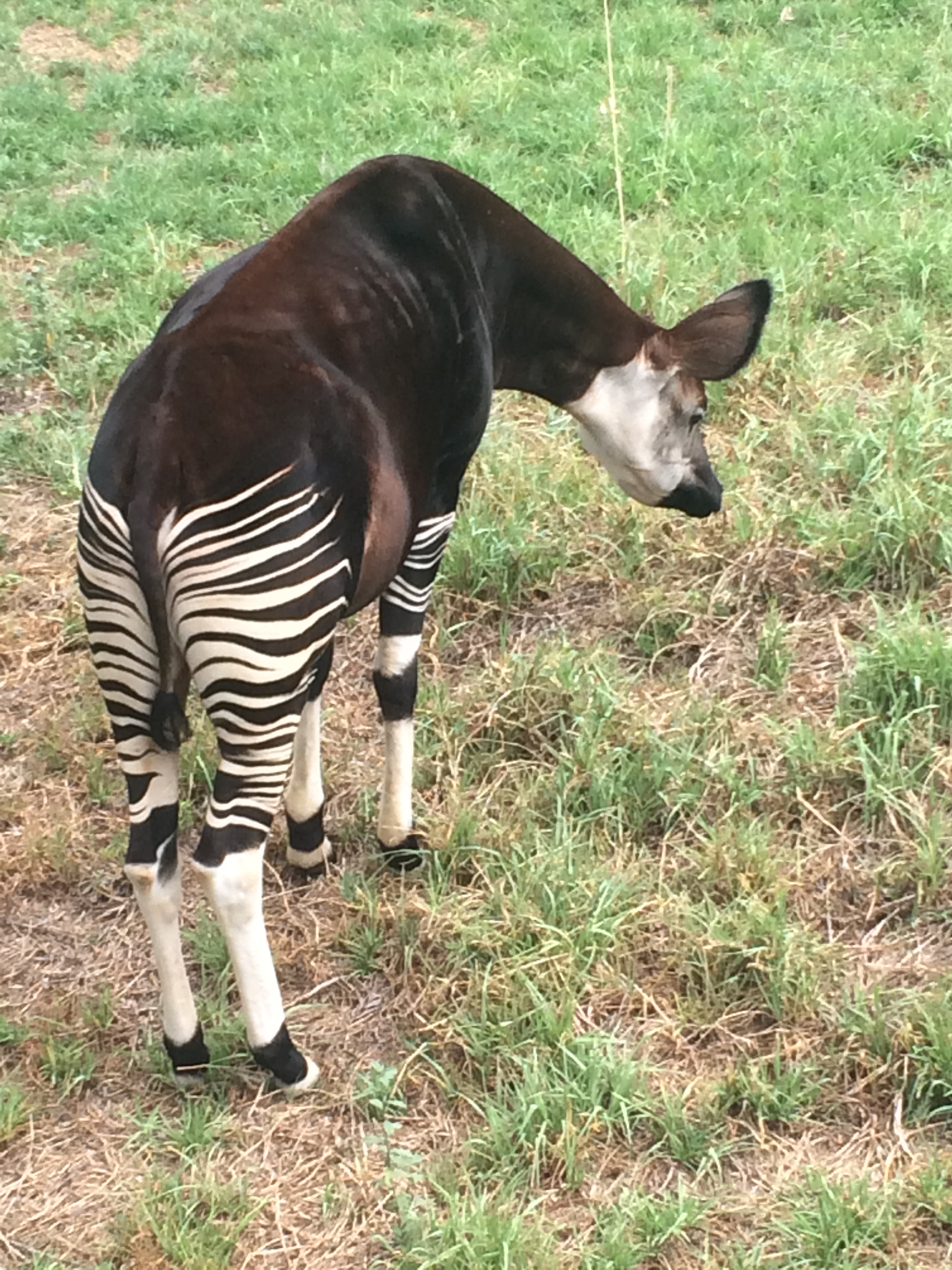
- Okapi at Pretoria Zoo
- Interactive map of National Zoological Garden of South Africa
- 25°44′18″S 28°11′21″E
- Date opened: 21 October 1899 (126 years ago)
- Location: 232 Boom Street, Pretoria, South Africa
- Land area: 85 hectares (210 acres)
- No. of animals: About 9,000
- No. of species: About 700
- Annual visitors: More than 600,000
- Memberships: WAZA, PAAZA, AKAA
- Major exhibits: Aquarium, Aviary, Mammals, Reptiles
- Management: South African National Biodiversity Institute
- Website: https://www.pretoriazoo.org/

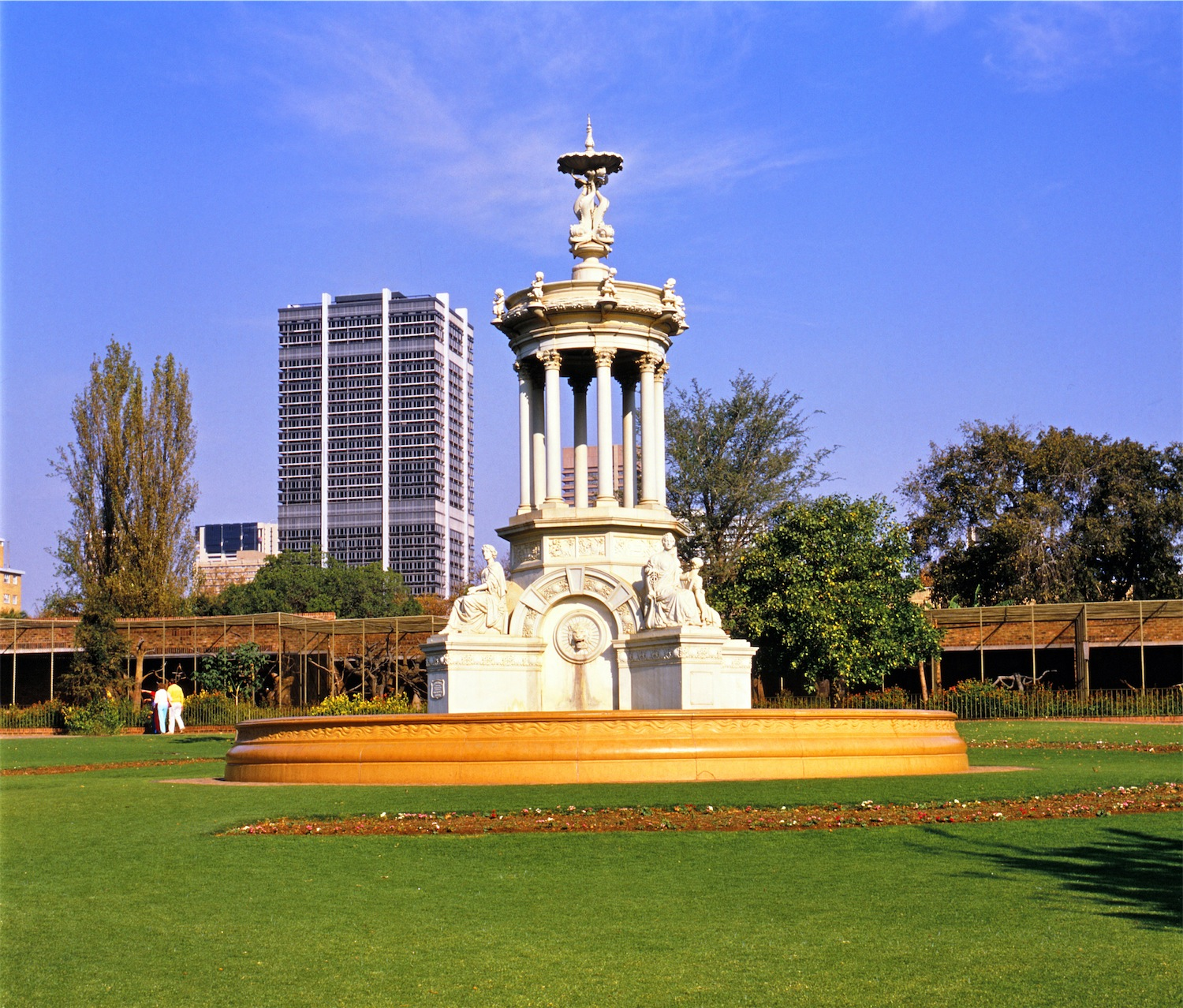
The Sammy Marks Fountain in the Zoological gardens

The National Zoological Garden of South Africa (Afrikaans: Nasionale Dieretuin van Suid-Afrika; also informally known as The Pretoria Zoo) is an 80-hectare (200-acre) zoo located in Pretoria, South Africa. It is the national zoo of South Africa, and was founded by J. W. B. Gunning in 1899. Pretoria Zoo is one of the eight largest zoos in the world.

== History ==
The farm Klein Schoemansdal, the property of Z.A.R. president Stephanus Schoeman, was sold to Johannes Francois Celliers who renamed it Rus in Urbe. It was acquired by the state in 1895, and the zoological garden was established at the outbreak of the Second Boer War in 1899. It became the official National Zoological Gardens in 1916. After a period of management under the auspices of the South African National Research Foundation, the Pretoria Zoo today is management under the umbrella of the South African National Biodiversity Institute (SANBI).

== Landscape ==
Half of the zoo is situated on relatively flat ground, while the other half is located on the slopes of a hill. The two areas are separated by the Apies River flowing through the zoo. Two bridges provide access over the river.

== Infrastructure ==
Around 6 kilometres (3.7 mi) of pathways are laid out in the zoo. Golf carts are available for rent for those that prefer not to walk; most, but not all of the exhibits are accessible by golf cart. A cable car links the top of the hill with a point close to the entrance at the bottom. Two restaurants are located within the zoo, besides a picnic area on the banks of the Apies River. A crafts market is located outside the zoo entrance.

== Exhibits ==
Group	Species	Animals
Mammals	209	3117
Birds	202	1358
Fish	190	3871
Invertebrates	4	388
Reptiles	93	309
Amphibians	7	44
Total	705	9087

Proceeding from the entrance a visitor encounters a walk-through aviary, enclosures for African penguins, Cape fur seals, leopards, flamingoes, and lemurs, further bird aviaries and the hamadryas baboon and monkey enclosures along the western boundary.

At the centre of the zoo large sections are set aside for the African savannah waterhole and a set of large enclosures for smaller carnivores, cheetahs, black and white rhinos, giraffes, hippos, plains zebras, African buffaloes and okapis respectively. Amongst these are smaller enclosures for primates, African wild dogs, red kangaroos and breeding units for birds.

Against the northern hillside are large enclosures for lions, tigers, brown bears, Nubian ibexes, western lowland gorillas and other animals. In the western section the zoo includes two aquariums, and a reptile park, accessed via a separate entrance.

In 2024, the zoo transferred its last elephant, Charley, to a wildlife reserve following negotiations between the South African government and animal rights groups protesting against his confinement.

== Gallery ==
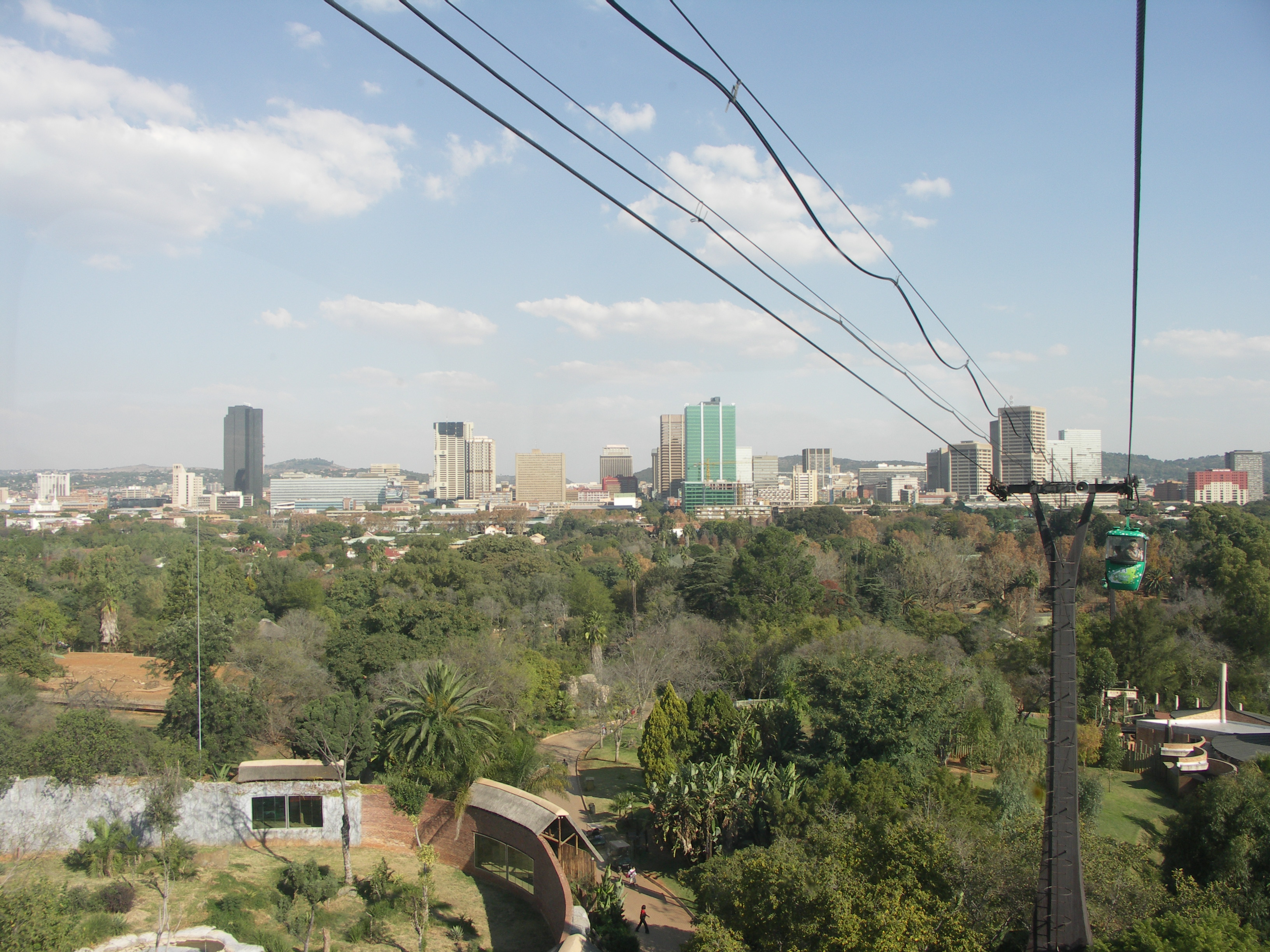
Cableway over the zoo

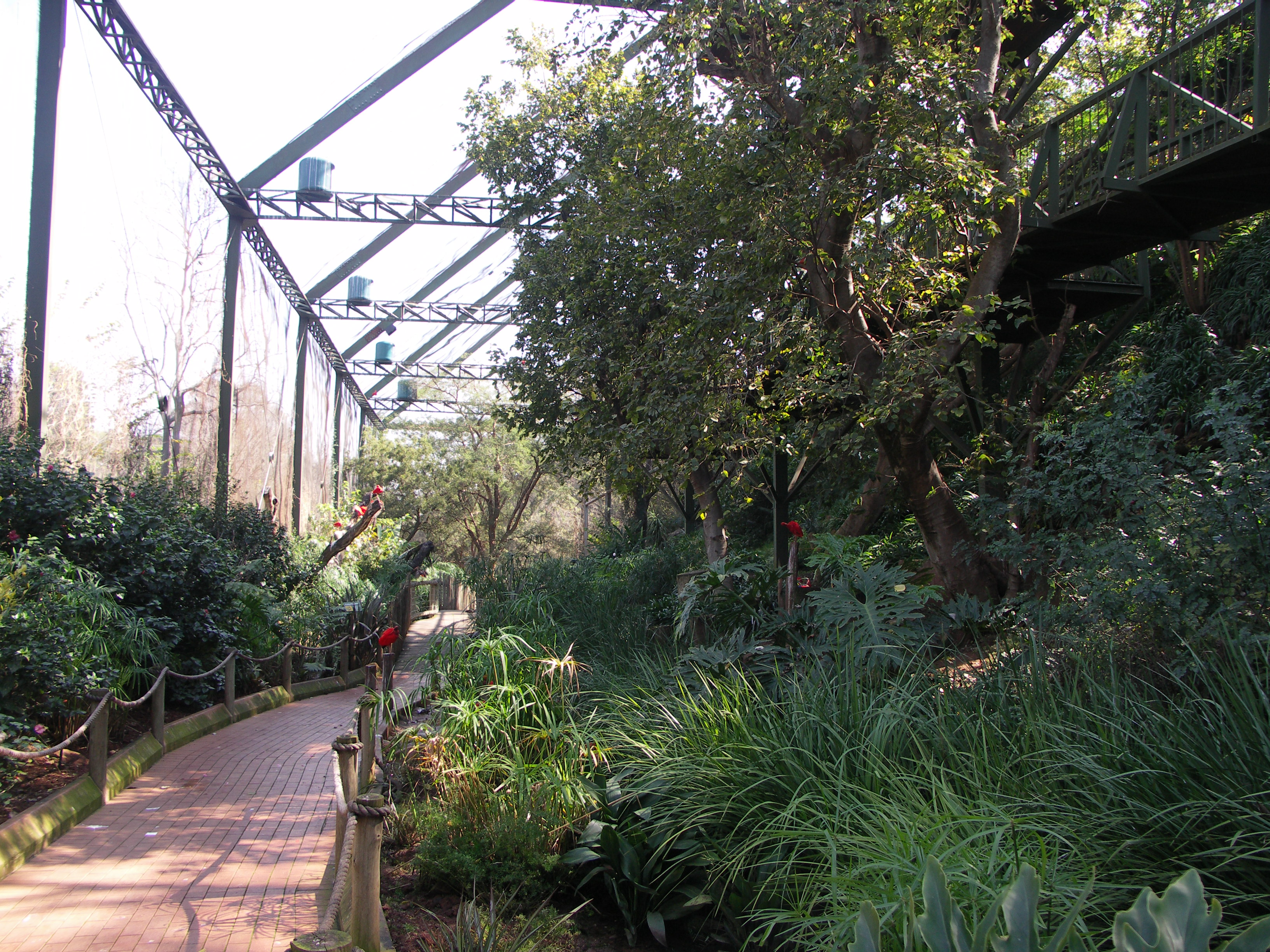
Inside the aviary

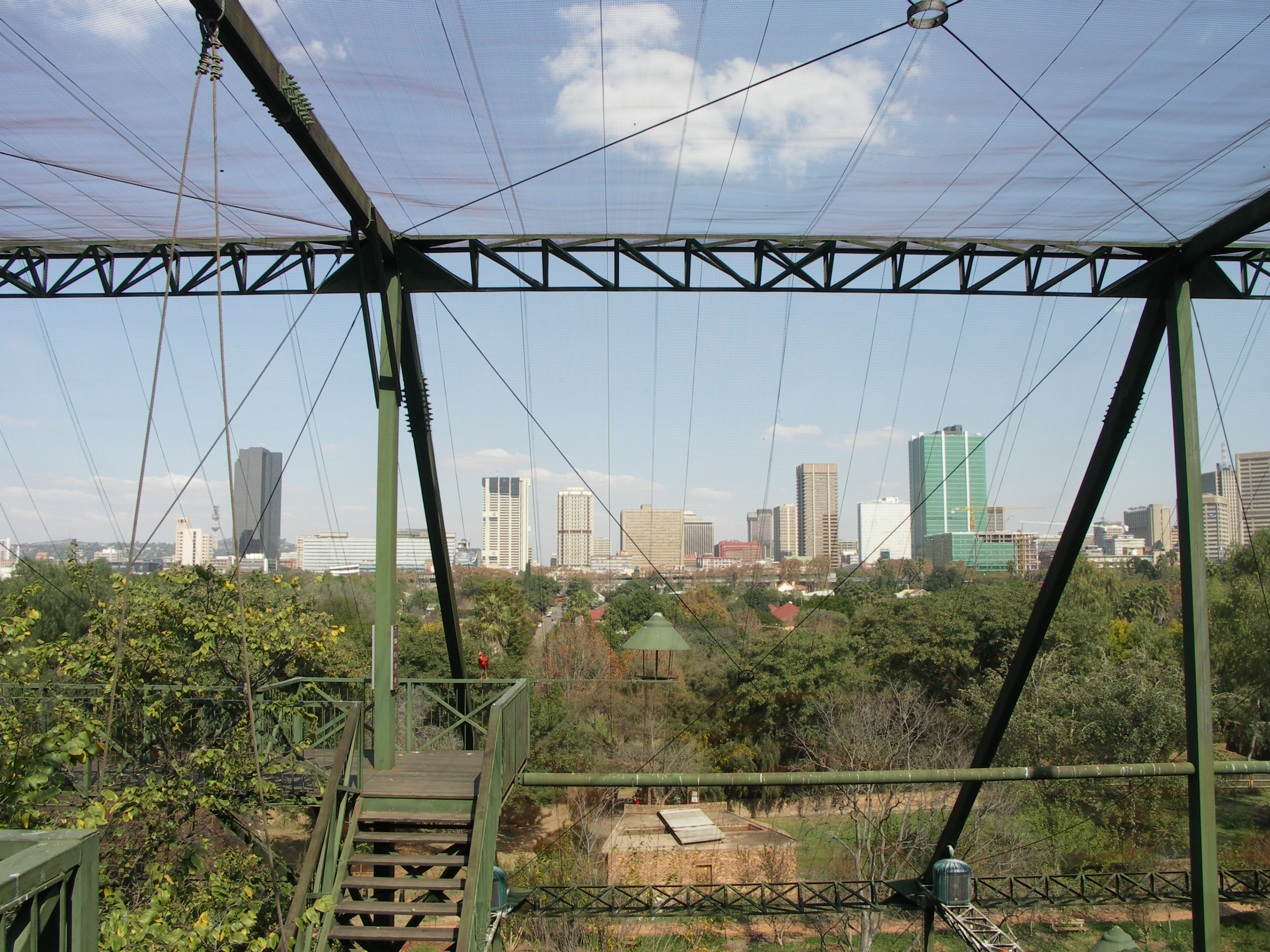
Pretoria skyline seen from within the aviary

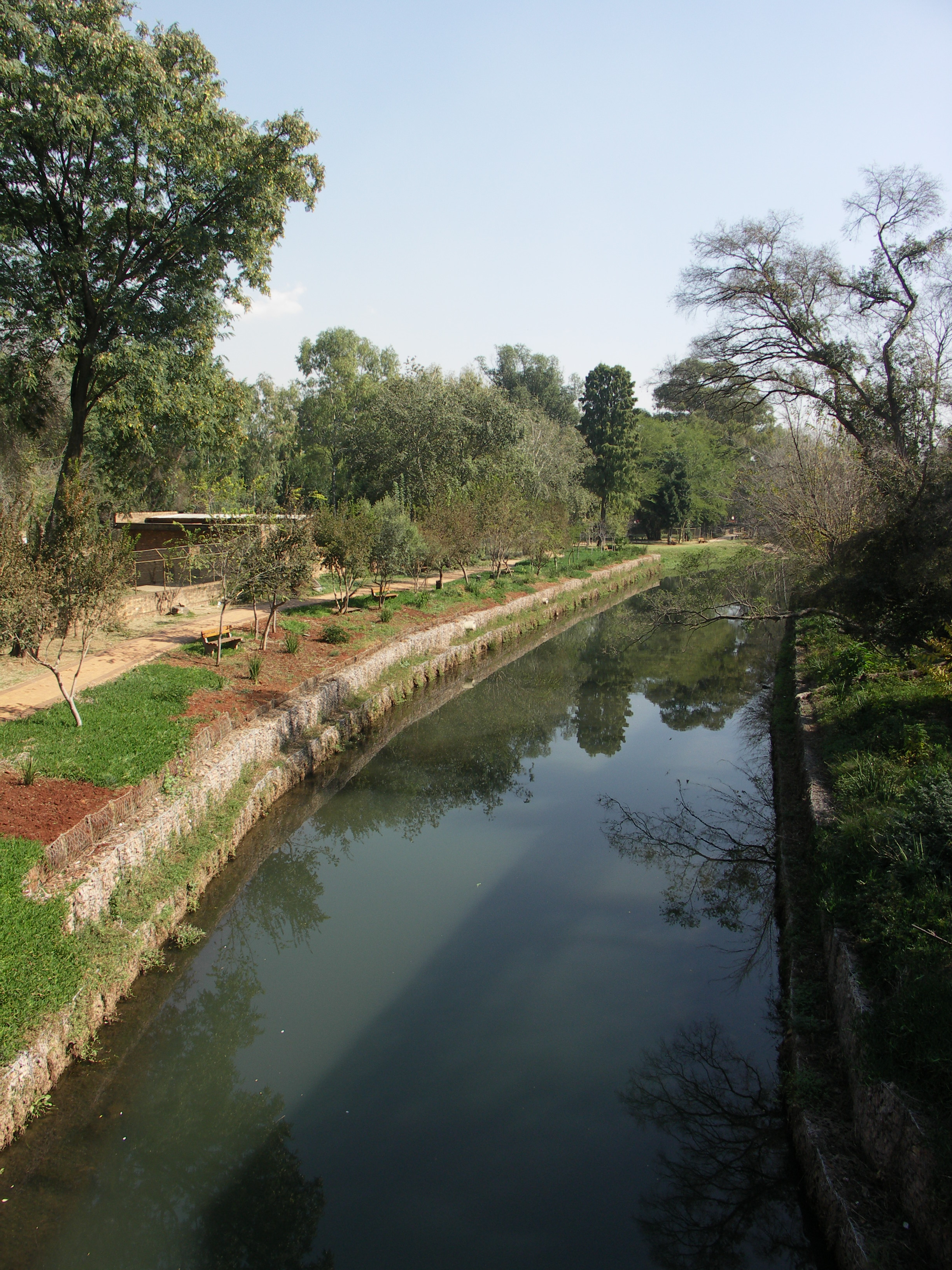
Apies River flowing through the zoo

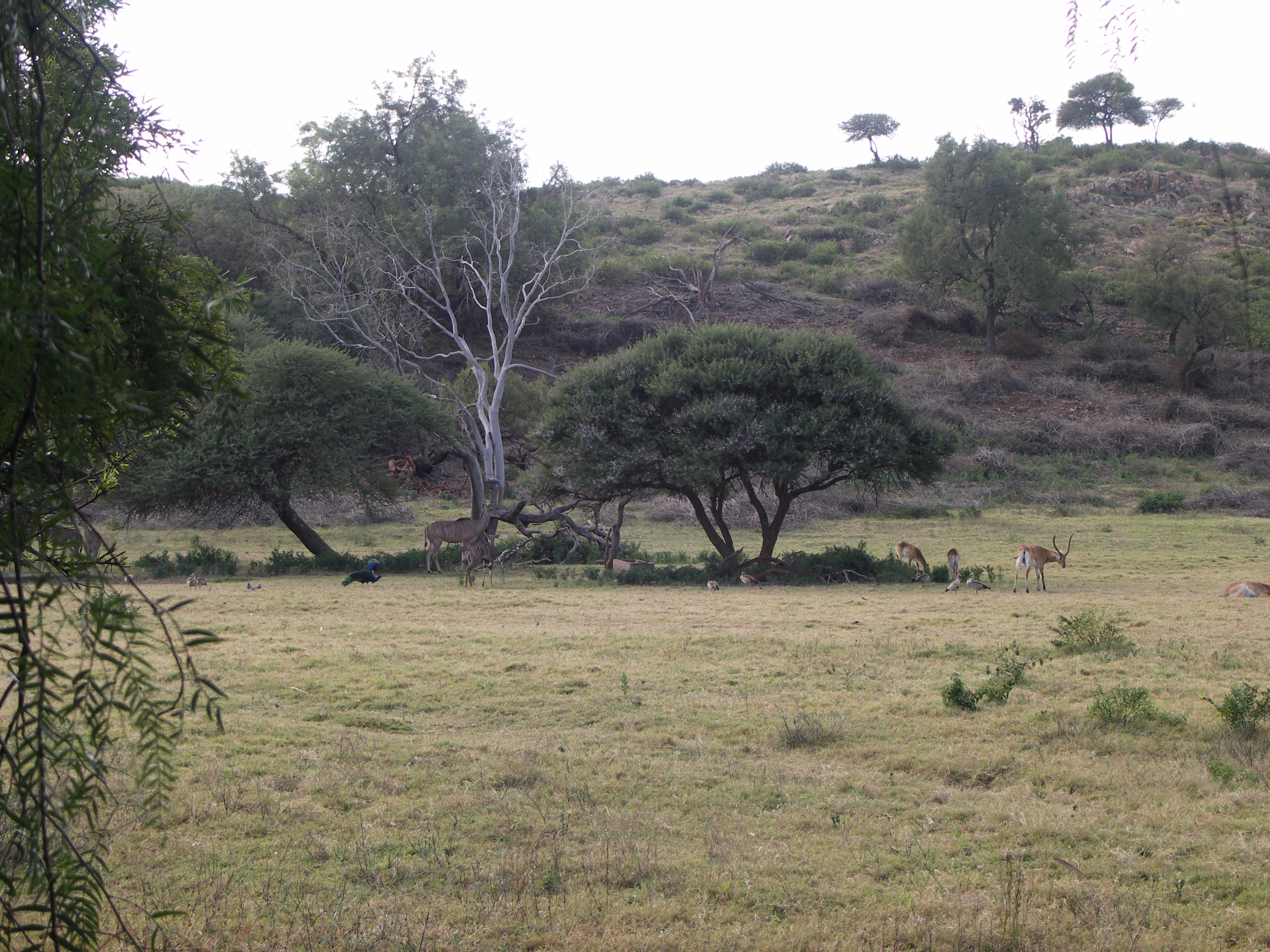
African savannah exhibit

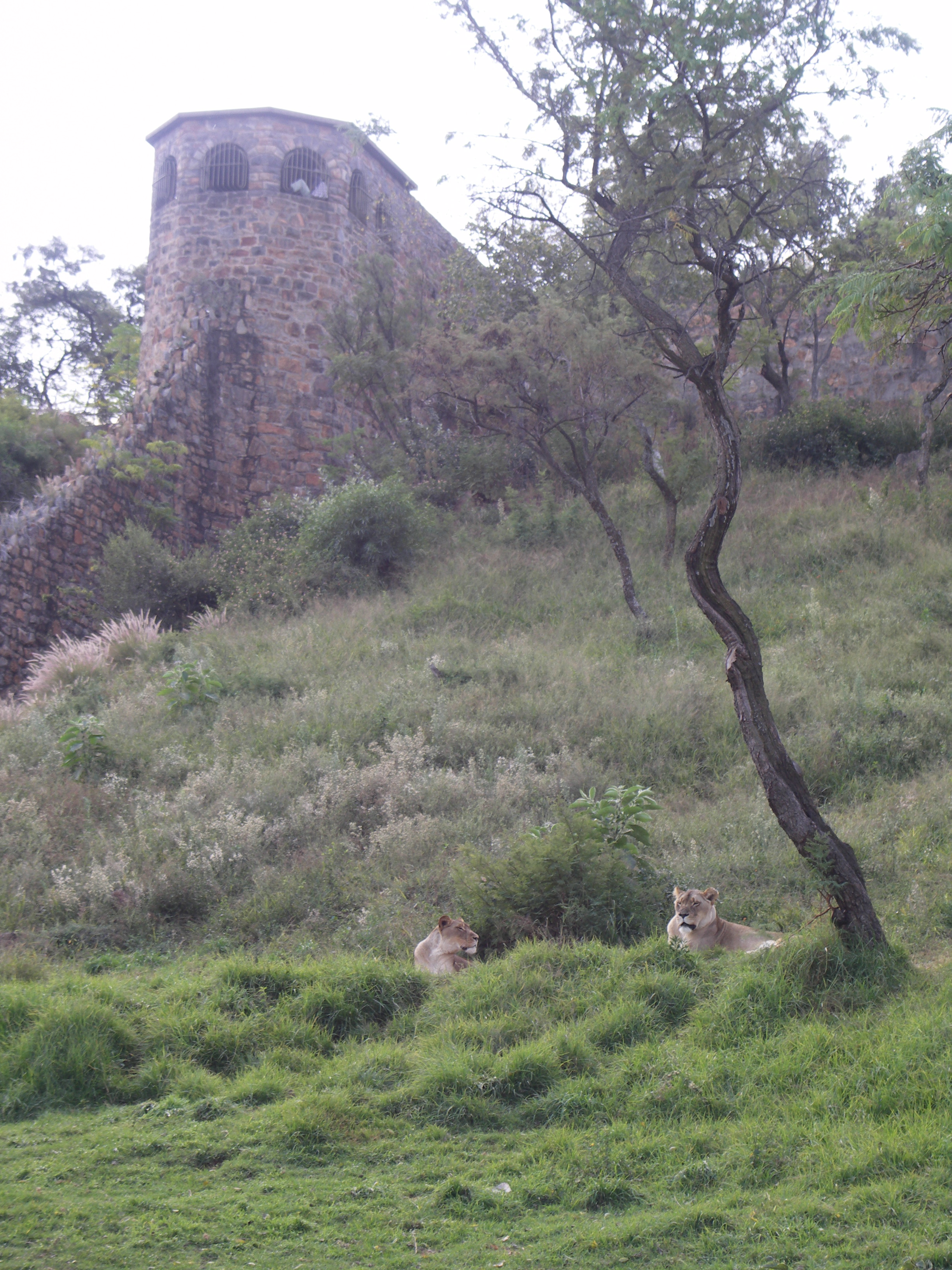
Lions in the hill enclosure

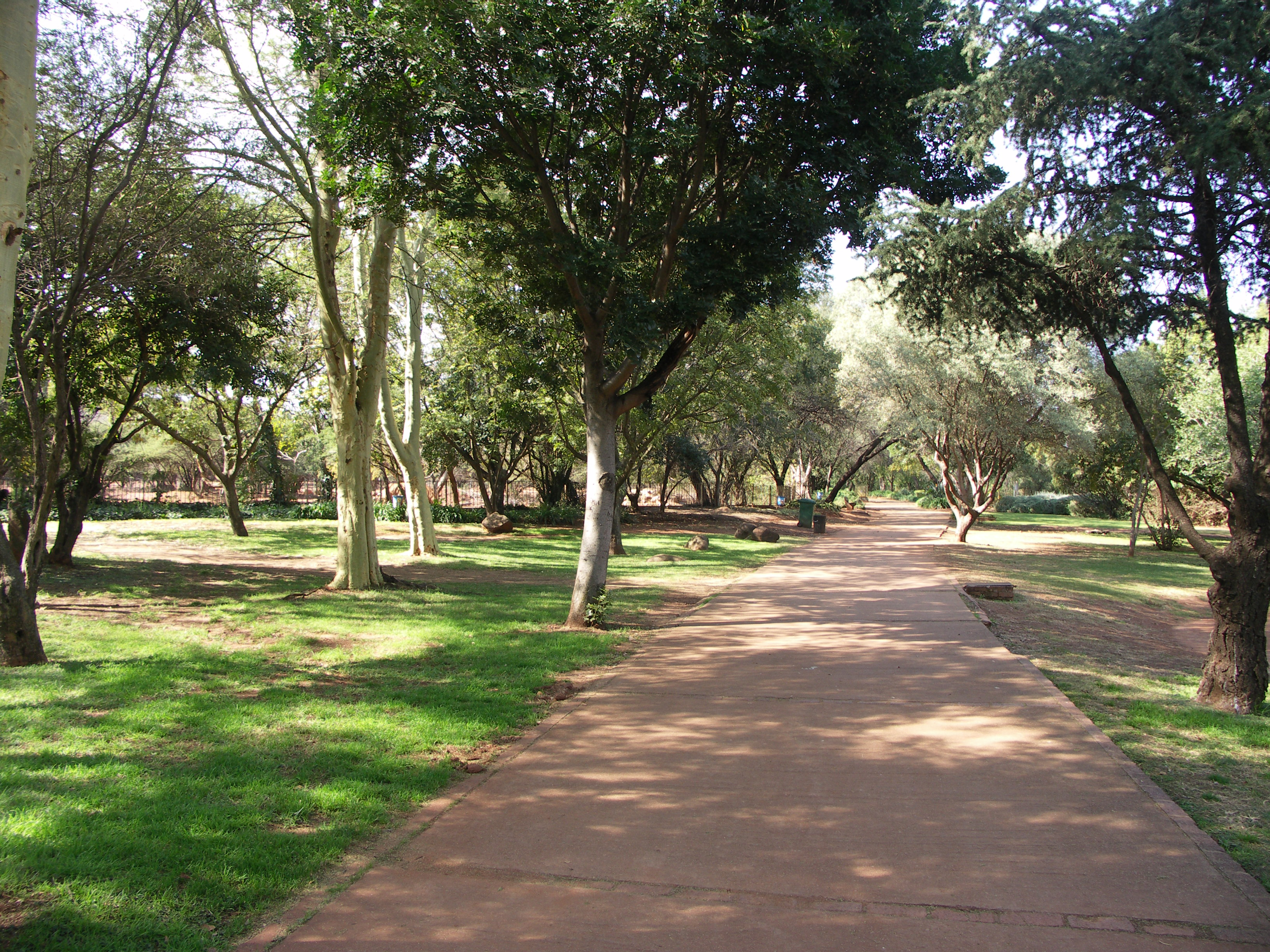
A shady walkway

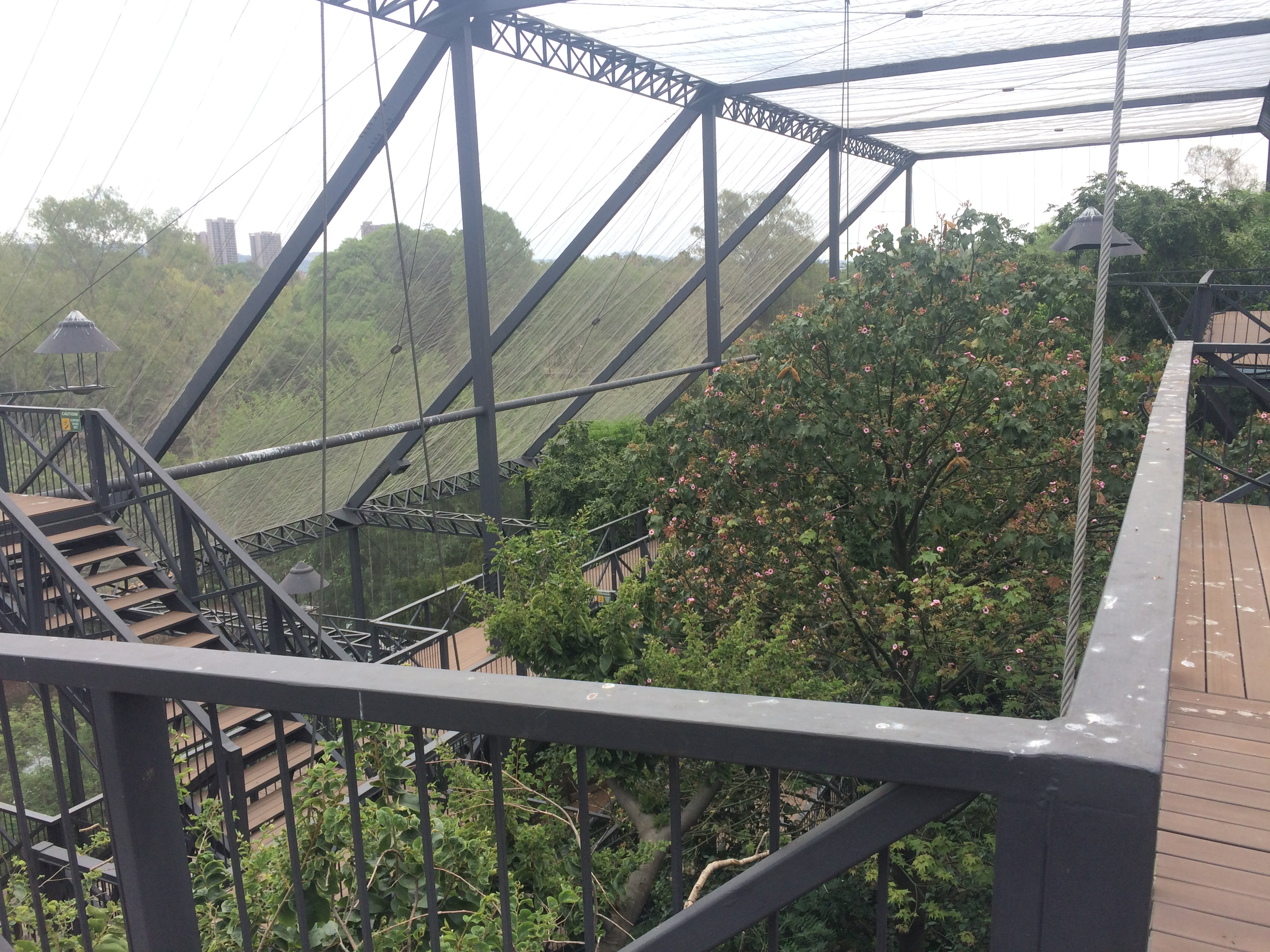
Upper story of the Aviary

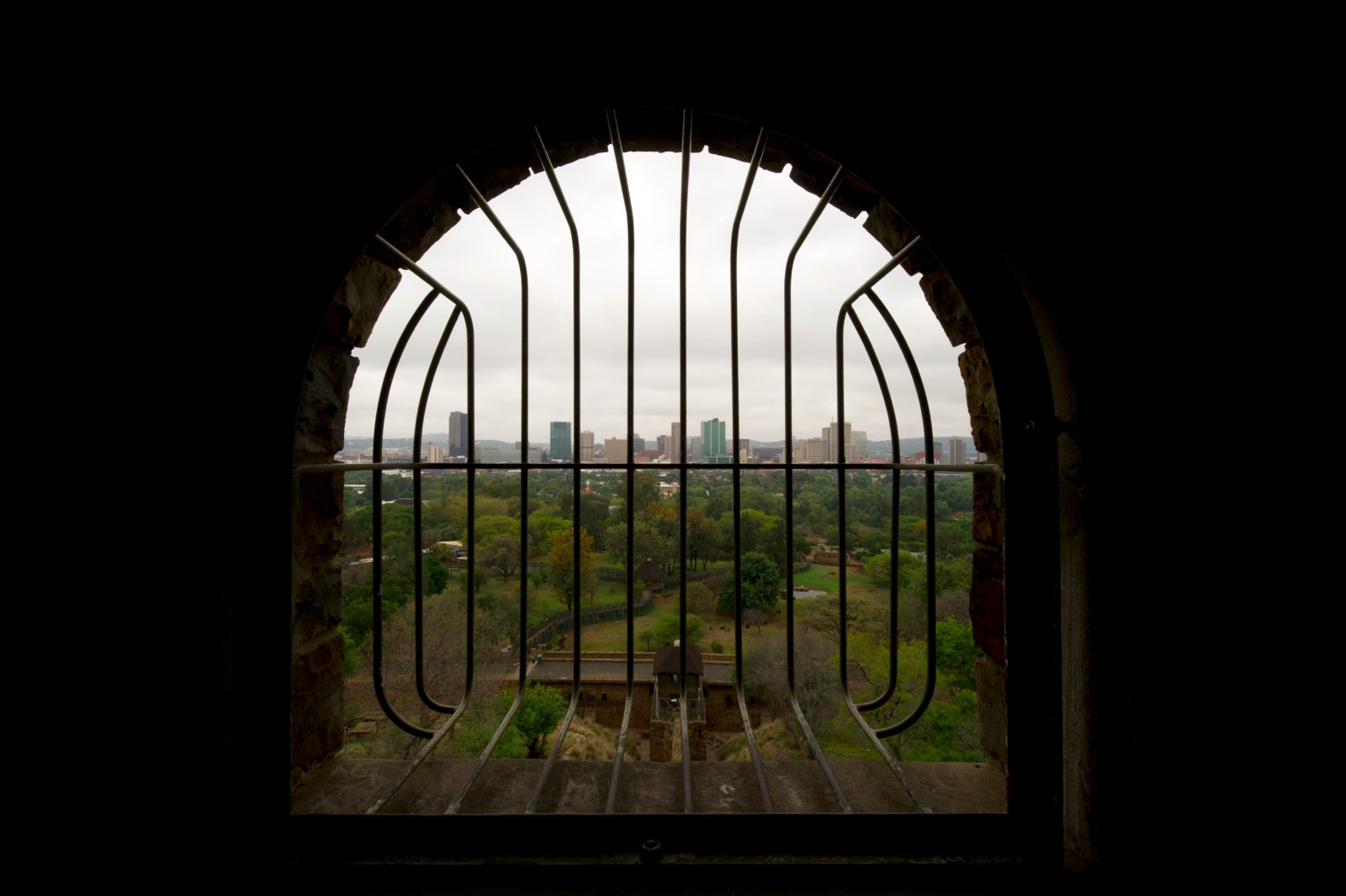
From inside the ramparts at the top of the hill

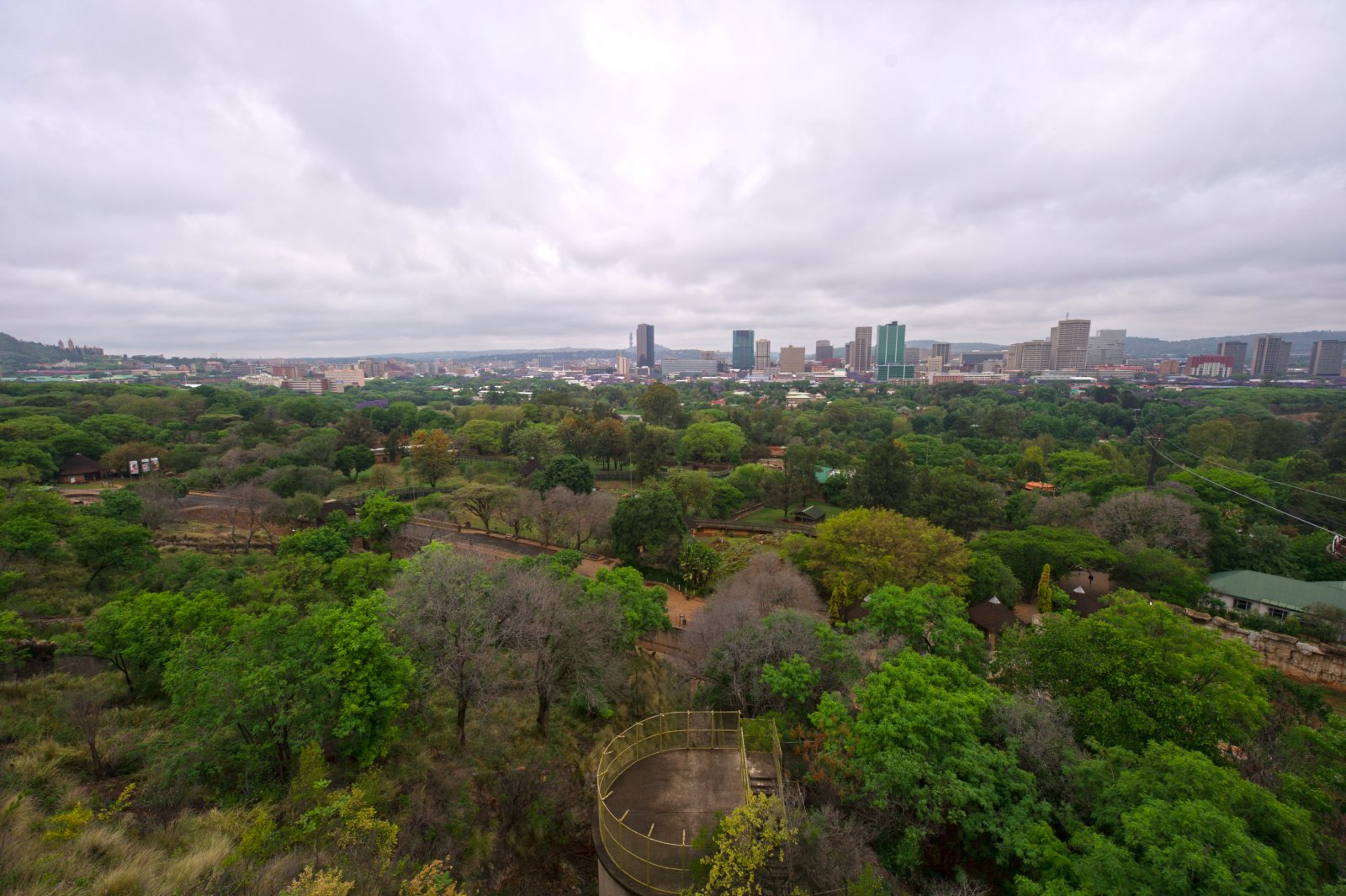
Pretoria skyline from the zoo

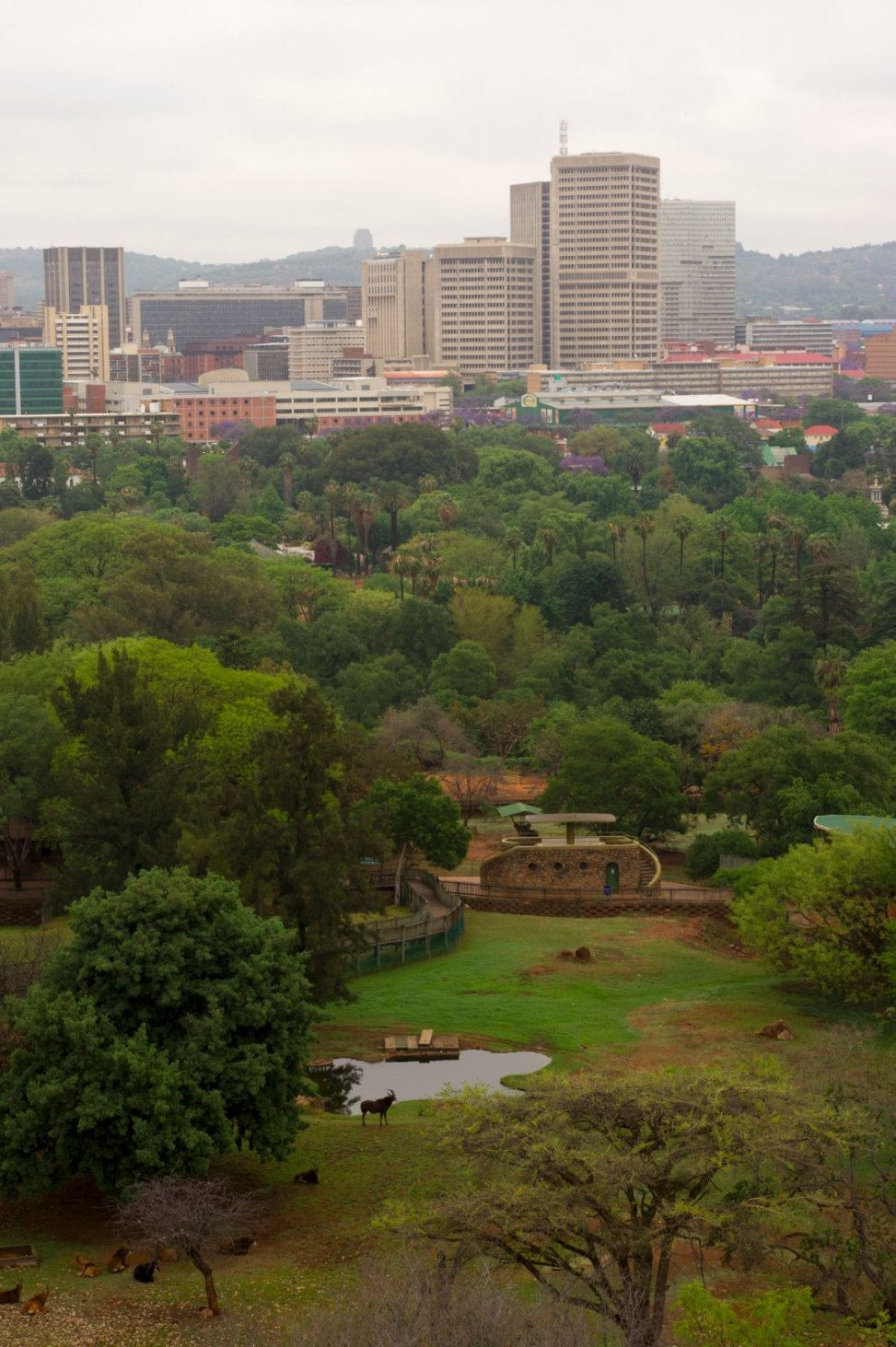
Pretoria from the zoo
