= Gouritz Water Management Area =

Gouritz WMA, or Gouritz Water Management Area (coded: 16), in South Africa includes the following major rivers: the Gouritz River, Olifants River, Kamanassie River, Gamka River, Buffels River, Touws River, Goukou River and Duiwenhoks River, and covers the following Dams:

- Calitzdorp Dam Nels River
- Duiwenhoks Dam Duiwenhoks River
- Ernest Robertson Dam Groot Brak River
- Floriskraal Dam Buffels River
- Gamka Dam Gamka River
- Gamkapoort Dam Gamka River
- Garden Route Dam Swart River
- Haarlem Dam Groot River
- Hartebeestkuil Dam Hartenbos River
- Kammanassie Dam Kammanassie River
- Korentepoort Dam Korinte River
- Leeugamka Dam Leeu River
- Miertjieskraal Dam Brand River
- Oukloof Dam Cordiers River
- Prinsrivier Dam Prins River
- Stompdrift Dam Olifants River
- Wolwedans Dam Groot Brak River

== Boundaries ==
Primary drainage region J and tertiary drainage regions H80, H90, K10 to K70.

== See also ==
- Water Management Areas
- List of reservoirs and dams in South Africa
- List of rivers of South Africa
