= List of drainage basins of South Africa =

A drainage basin is an extent of land where water from rain and melting snow or ice drains downhill into a body of water, such as a river, lake, reservoir, estuary, wetland, sea or ocean. The drainage basin includes both the streams and rivers that convey the water as well as the land surfaces from which water drains into those channels, and is separated from adjacent basins by a drainage divide.

The drainage basin acts like a funnel, collecting all the water within the area covered by the basin and channelling it into a waterway. Each drainage basin is separated topographically from adjacent basins by a geographical barrier such as a ridge, hill or mountain, which is known as a water divide.

Other terms that are used to describe a drainage basin are catchment, catchment area, catchment basin, drainage area, river basin, water basin and watershed.

The drainage basins in South Africa do not correspond with the Water Management Areas, and have the letters A, B, C, D, E, F, G, H, J, K, L, M, N, P, Q, R, S, T, U, V, W, and X. The Area A comes close to the same area that the Limpopo WMA seems to cover. Apart from these letters they seem to have no name referring to them. What seems to be the case though is that each area refers to some major river systems and their tributaries (a region for each major river system).

== List of drainage basins ==
Code^{[A]}	Name	Area km^{2}	Gross capacity ×10^{3}m^{3}	Nr. regions	Major rivers	Drains to	Notes
A			1,284	9	Limpopo River	Indian Ocean	^{[B]}
B			1,502	9	Olifants River	Limpopo River	
C			7,941	9	Vaal River	Orange River	^{[C]}^{[D]}
D			11,105	8	Orange River (below Gariep Dam), Kraai River	South Atlantic	
E			128	4	Olifants River (above confluence with the Doring River), Groot River	South Atlantic	
F				6	Buffels River	South Atlantic	
G			445	5	Berg River, Diep River, Eerste River, Verlorevlei River, Bot River, Klein River, Uilkraal River	South Atlantic	
H			1,024	9	Hex River, Kingna River, Breede River (below Brandvlei Dam), Tributaries of the Sonderend River above theewaterskloof Dam	Indian Ocean	
J			200	4	Touws River, Gamka River, Olifants River, Langtou River, Weyers River		
K			183	9	Little Brak River, Great Brak River, Karatara River, Knysna River, Keurbooms River, Bloukrans River, Lottering River, Storms River, Sandrif River, Groot River, Tsitsikamma River, Klippedrift River, Kromme River, Seekoei River, Kabelkous River	Indian Ocean	
L			219	9	Baviaanskloof River, Kouga River, Lower Gamtoos River		
M			12	3	Swartkops River, Maitland River, Van Stadens River	Indian Ocean	
N			227	4	Sundays River (below Darlington Dam, and above Vanrynevelds Pass Dam), Skoenmakers River (below Skoenmakers Canal Outlet), Gats River	Indian Ocean	^{[D]}
P				4	Bushmans River, Kowie River, Kariega River	Indian Ocean	
Q			131	9	Great Fish River, Little Fish River, Tarka River, Vlekpoort River, Lake Arthur	Indian Ocean	^{[D]}
R			211	5	Buffels River, Kwenxura River, Kwelera River, Gonubie River, Nahoon River		
S			610	7	White Kei River (above Xonxa Dam), Indwe River (above Lubisi Dam), Swart Kei River (above Klipplaat River confluence), Klipplaat River (above Waterdown Dam), Oxkraal River (above Oxkraal Dam), Thorn River, Thomas River, Tsomo River, Kwa-Qokwama River, Mbokotwa River, Kubisi River (above Wriggleswade Dam), Toise River, Xilinxa River (above Xilinxa Dam)		
T			248	9	Slang River, Xuka River, Mtata River (above Mtata Dam), Tsitsa River, Pot River, Mooi River, Inxu River, Wildebees River, Gatberg River	Indian Ocean	
U			806	8	Mgeni River, Mvoti River	Indian Ocean	
V			1,110	7	Tugela River, Mooi River, Sundays River, Bushmans River	Indian Ocean	^{[B]}
W			3,283	7	Umfolozi River, White Umfolozi River, Black Umfolozi River, Pongola River, Mkuze River	Indian Ocean	
X			1,049	4	Nkomati River, Crocodile River		

- A Drainage basin code assigned by the Department of Water Affairs (South Africa); see for details.
- B The Limpopo River Basin is not wholly located within South Africa, it straddles four countries, Botswana, Mozambique, South Africa and Zimbabwe.
- C The Tugela and Vaal drainage basins are linked with the Tugela-Vaal Water Project, an interbasin transfer scheme across the Drakensberg watershed that supplies additional water to the Vaal River when required. The Drakensberg Pumped Storage Scheme forms an integral part of this scheme.
- D The Gariep Dam on the Orange River basin is linked via the Great Fish River basin to the Sundays River basin by the Fish-Sundays Transfer Scheme.

== See also ==
- Drainage basin
- List of reservoirs and dams in South Africa
- List of rivers of South Africa
- Water Management Areas
- Geography of South Africa
