= Gamka =

Gamka is a South African place name and may refer to:

== Dams on the Gamka River ==
- Leeu-Gamka Dam, on the Leeuw River near Beaufort West, Western Cape, South Africa
- Gamkapoort Dam, on the Gamka River, near Prince Albert, Western Cape, South Africa
- Gamka Dam, on the Gamka River in South Africa

== Other uses ==
- Leeu-Gamka, a town in the Great Karoo
- Gamkaberg, a mountain in the Little Karoo and its associated nature reserve
- Gamkapoort Nature Reserve, part of the Cape Floral Region Protected Areas
- Gamka River, a South African river
- Gamka (beetle), a genus of insects in the family Scarabaeidae
