= List of Water Management Areas =

Parts of South Africa that are managed by the Water Boards

Water Management Areas (WMAs) are parts of South Africa that are managed by Catchment Management Agencies (CMAs). A CMA is established in terms of the National Water Act of 1998. (As of December 2020 only two CMAs have been established).

The list should be complete, and in accordance with the definitions of the Department of Water Affairs. Apart from these WMAs they also have a number of Water Drainage Areas (some dams are only used for drainage, some seem to be used for both).

== List of Water Management Areas ==
Name of WMA	Gross capacity x10³M³	Nr.	Main rivers	Location
Berg Water Management Area	416	19	Berg River, Diep River and Steenbras River	Around Cape Town, Western Cape
Breede Water Management Area	1 039	18	Breede River, Riviersonderend River, Sout River, Bot River and Palmiet River	Around Cape Aghulas, Western Cape
Crocodile (West) and Marico Water Management Area	814	3	Crocodile River and Marico River	Mostly North West
Fish to Tsitsikama Water Management Area	726	15	Great Fish River, Kowie River, Boesmans River, Sundays River, Gamtoos River, Kromme River, Tsitsikamma River and Groot River	Western part of Eastern Cape
Gouritz Water Management Area	261	16	Gouritz River, Olifants River, Kamanassie River, Gamka River, Buffels River, Touws River, Goukou River and Duiwenhoks River	Eastern part of Western Cape
Inkomati Water Management Area	1 049	5	Komati River and Crocodile River	Eastern Mpumalanga
Limpopo Water Management Area	281	1	Limpopo River, Matlabas River, Mokolo River, Lephalala River, Mogalakwena River, Sand River, Nzhelele River and Nwanedi River	Limpopo province
Lower Orange Water Management Area	36	14	Ongers River, Hartbees River and Orange River	Mostly Northern Cape
Lower Vaal Water Management Area	106	10	Harts River, Molopo River and Vaal River	North West and northern Northern Cape
Luvubu and Letaba Water Management Area	652	2	Mutale River, Luvuvhu River and Letaba River	Northeast Limpopo
Middle Vaal Water Management Area	1 673	9	Mooi River, Vet River and Vaal River	Northwest Free State
Mvoti to Umzimkulu Water Management Area	806	11	Mvoti River, Tongaat River, Mdloti River, Ohlanga river, Umgeni River, Sterkspruit River, Lovu River, Umkomazi River, Mzimayi River, Umzimkulu River, Mtamvuna River	Around Durban
Mzimvubu to Keiskamma Water Management Area	1 070	12	Swane River, Mntafufu River, Mzimvubu River, Mngazi River, Mtata River, Xora River, Mbashe River, Nqabara River, Gqunube River, Buffalo River, Nahoon River, Groot Kei River	Rest of Eastern Cape
Olifants Water Management Area	1 074	4	Elands River, Wilge River, Steelpoort River and Olifants River	Southern part of Limpopo, northern Mpumalanga
Olifants/Doorn Water Management Area	128	17	Olifants River, Doorn River, Krom River, Sand River, and Sout River	Western Cape north of Cape Town
Thukela Water Management Area	1 110	7	Thukela River	Western KwaZulu-Natal
Upper Orange WMA	11 566	13	Modder River, Riet River, Caledon River and Orange River	Southern Free State
Upper Vaal WMA	5 630	8	Wilge River, Liebenbergsvlei River and Vaal River	Gauteng, northern Free State, southern Mpumalanga
Usutu to Mhlatuze Water Management Area	3 283	6	Usutu River, Pongola River, Mhlatuze River, Mfolozi River and Mkuze River	Northern KwaZulu-Natal

== See also ==
- List of dams and reservoirs in South Africa
- List of drainage basins of South Africa
- List of rivers of South Africa
