= Buffelspoort =

Coordinates: 33°25′35″S 20°57′45″E

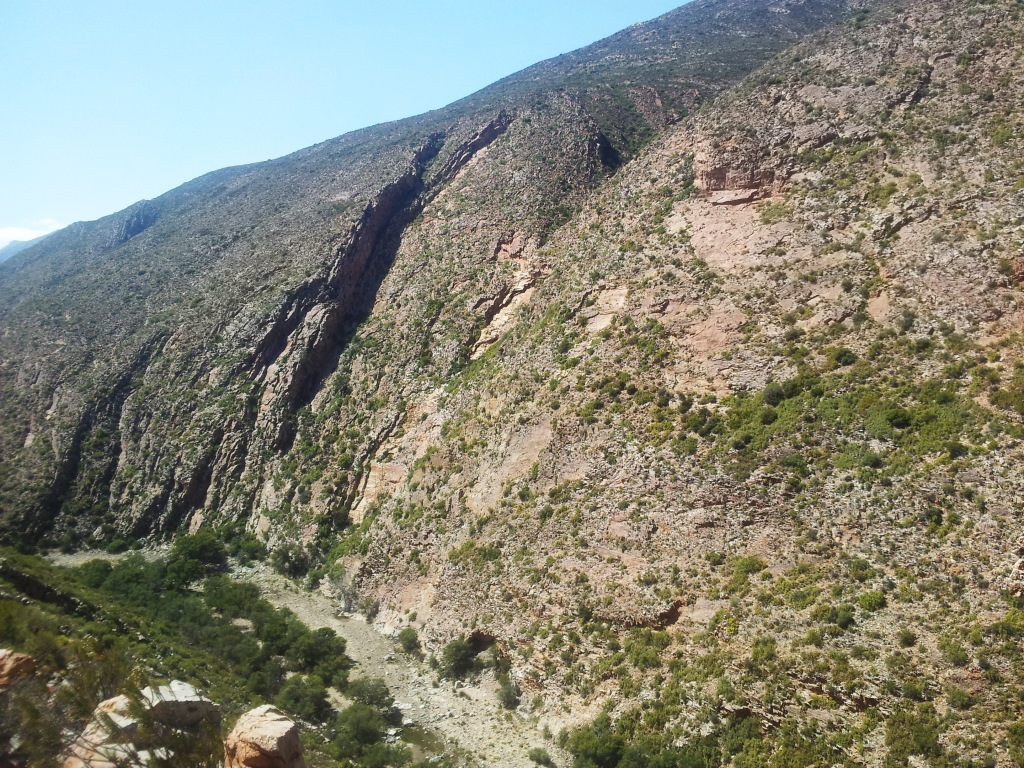
Mountain slopes at the northern entrance to Buffelspoort, Swartberg

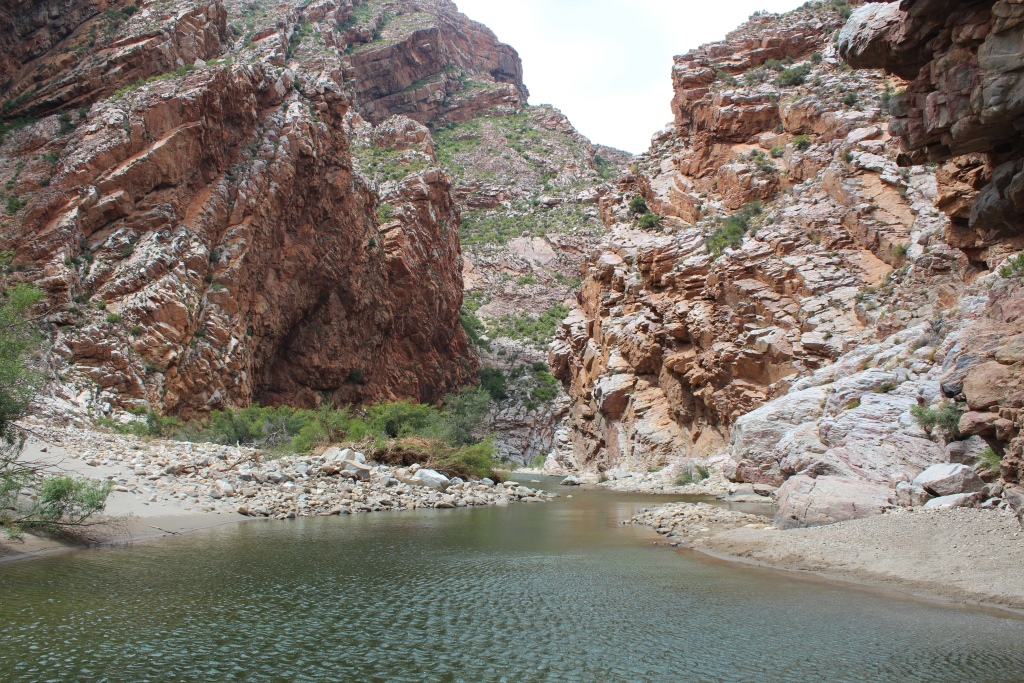
Buffelspoort where the Buffels River exits the gorge in the south

Buffelspoort is the westernmost of five defiles that cut through the Swartberg Mountain range, situated in the Western Cape province of South Africa. The others are the Seweweekspoort, Die Poort, where the Gamka River transects Die Hel, Meiringspoort, and Snykloof at its eastern extremity.

The deep gorge and river valley is located some 10 km from the western limit of the Swartberg range, in the section known as the Klein Swartberge. After exiting Floriskraal Dam, the Buffels River enters the Swartberg's foothills or Wit Nekke, before it enters Buffelspoort from the north. The 9 km long gorge connects the northern foothills of the Swartberg with the Little Karoo in the south, where the Buffels River exits the defile. Downstream from this point the Buffels is known as the Groot River.

The vegetation of this remote and untouched gorge is predominantly the arid, succulent-rich Gamka Thicket vegetation, and includes many endemics, such as Astroloba cremnophila.

The defile is not to be confused with the Buffelspoort Dam, an unrelated land-form situated far to the north in North West Province, South Africa.
