= Touws River =

Touws River may refer to:

- Touws River (river), a river in the Western Cape, South Africa
- Touws River (town), a town situated on the banks of the river
