= Timour Hall Villa =

Historic estate in Cape Town, South Africa

Timour Hall Villa, a mansion and its surrounding estate is a Grade 2 listed heritage site in Plumstead (Cape Town, South Africa). Until recently it was used as a guesthouse by the (IPA), but they closed it at the end of April 2020.

Johan Georg Lochner of Mannheim, Germany, was awarded this smallholding on the Diep River in 1784. He is the ancestor of a prominent, eponymous family in South Africa. In 1878, William Duckitt's granddaughter, Aletta Jacoba Smith, purchased the property and gave it its current name. Much of the original land from the original driveway on the right side of the highway to along what is now Timour Hall Road was lost to urban sprawl. The home was built in the Victorian style with a Cape Dutch flair. A large porch lies in front, and several outbuildings are in the back. Its architectural significance led the Government of the Western Cape to declare the property a heritage site.

== Bibliography ==
- Fransen, Hans (2004). A guide to the old buildings of the Cape – a survey of extant architecture from before c. 1910 in the area of Cape Town, Calvinia, Colesberg and Uitenhage. Cape Town: Jonathan Ball. ISBN 1-86842-191-0
