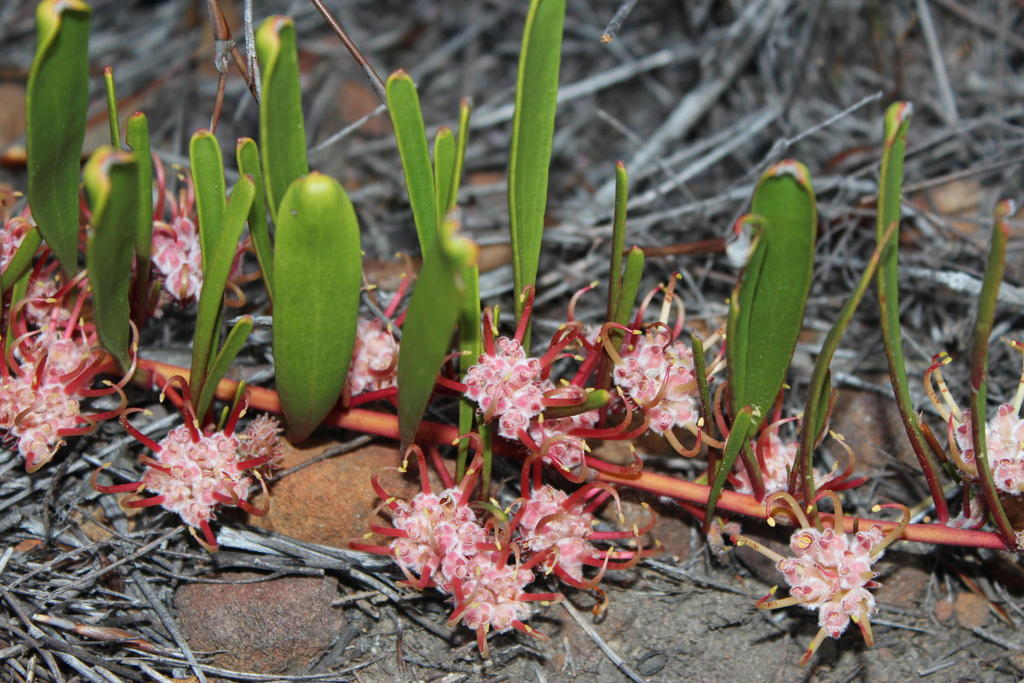

Conservation status
- Critically Endangered (IUCN 3.1)

Scientific classification
- Kingdom: Plantae
- Clade: Tracheophytes
- Clade: Angiosperms
- Clade: Eudicots
- Order: Proteales
- Family: Proteaceae
- Genus: Leucospermum
- Species: L. harpagonatum

Binomial name
- Leucospermum harpagonatum Rourke

= Leucospermum harpagonatum =

Species of shrub

Leucospermum harpagonatum is an evergreen trailing shrublet with leathery, line-shaped, upright leaves and small heads with eight to ten cream, later carmine-colored, strongly incurved flowers assigned to the family Proteaceae. It is reminiscent of the hottentot fig without its flowers. It is called McGregor pincushion in English and flowers from late August till early November. It is critically endangered and occurs only in a very small area in the Western Cape province, South Africa.

== Description ==
Leucospermum harpagonatum is an evergreen crawling shrublet of about 15 cm (5.9 in) high that can form dense mats of 1–3 m (3.3–9.8 ft) in diameter, with branches originating from a single trunk and radiating out. The flowering branches are reddish, initially finely powdery but soon becoming hairless, 3–5 mm (0.12–0.20 in) in diameter, and bear many stalked flower heads. It has line-shaped upright leaves of 5 1/2–11 cm (2.2–4.3 in) long and 2–10 mm (0.079–0.394 in) wide, narrowing into the leaf stalk, with an entire margin and rounded top with a single amber-colored thickening at the very tip. The upper surface of the leathery leafblade is somewhat concave, with slightly incurved margins.

Each flower head mostly consists of eight to ten, sometimes up to twelve 4-merous, bisexual flowers in a single whorl of 2 3/4–3 cm (1.1–1.2 in) in diameter on a leaf stalk of 1–2 cm (0.39–0.79 in) long. Each flowerhead is subtended by a prominent involucre consisting of 25–35 overlapping, oval or broadly oval bracts of 6–8 mm (0.24–0.31 in) long and 2–4 mm (0.079–0.157 in) wide, with a tuft of long straight hairs, pointy tips, which are bent somewhat outward. These involucral bracts are set in approximately three whorls. The common base of the flowers of the same head is inverted cone-shaped with a flat top and 3–5 mm (0.12–0.20 in) in diameter.

The bract subtending the individual flower, tightly embraces its base, is broadly oval in shape with a pointy tip, about 5 mm (0.20 in) wide and 6–7 mm (0.24–0.28 in) long, very densely set with long straight silky hairs. The 4-merous perianth is cream to pale carmine in colour, very strongly curved towards the center of the flower head, 1–1 1/2 cm (0.39–0.59 in) long. The lower part that remains merged upon opening, called tube, is prominently inflated, 9–10 mm (0.35–0.39 in) long and 5–6 mm (0.20–0.24 in) at its widest furthest from the base, narrow and hairless near the base and densely woolly near the top. The middle part where at least one of the lobes becomes free when the flower opens (called claws), strongly flexes back, is 4–5 mm (0.16–0.20 in) long, suddenly narrowed above tube, and densely woolly, particularly at the margins, carmine in colour when fresh. The higher part (called limbs) are lance-shaped with a pointy tip, about 3 mm (0.12 in) long, curved back in the open flower and densely set with long silky hair. Each of the four anthers are about 1 mm (0.039 in) long, merged directly to the center of each of the four limbs are the anthers without a filament.

The style is 2–2 1/2 cm (0.79–0.98 in) long, pointing from the centre of the head at its base but strongly curved midlength so that the top points towards the center of the flower head. The style is cream to carmine in colour, tapering towards the tip, and the upper half has barbs pointing to the base. The style ends in a thickened portion, to which the pollen has been transferred in the bud, called the pollen presenter, which is curved inwards and cone-shaped with a pointy tip and a distinct collar at its base. The minute groove that functions as the stigma can be found at the very tip of the pollen presenter. The ovary is about ½ mm (0.02 in) long, covered in very fine straight silky hairs pressed to its surface and gradually merges into the style. It is subtended by four yellow, nectar-producing, line-shaped scales with a pointy tip of about 2 mm (0.079 in) long. The fruit is a cylinder-shaped greyish white nut of about 8 mm (0.31 in) long and 5 mm (0.20 in) in diameter, with a powdery surface.

=== Differences with related species ===
L. harpagonatum is a close relative of Leucospermum hamatum. Both are low and far spreading shrubs with upright leaves, small heads with only relatively few flowers in a single whorl, very small barbs pointing to the base on the upper outside end of the styles, and the upper end of the perianth tube inflated. L. hapagonatum has line-shaped, entire leaves without teeth, generally eight to ten flowers per head, subtended by an involucre of 25–35 bracts and densely woolly perianth tubes. L. hamatum however has narrowly lance-shaped leaves with mostly three teeth, generally four to seven flowers per head, which is subtended by an involucre of three to four bracts or the involucre may be absent, but with four or five conspicuous bracteoles subtending individual flowers.

== Taxonomy ==
The McGregor pincushion was first discovered for science in 1993 by Tony Rebelo and Fiona Powrie. The following year, South African botanist and Proteaceae specialist John Patrick Rourke described it as Leucospermum harpagonatum.

The species is clearly closely related to L. hamatum, but they occur in separate areas that are approximately 200 km (120 mi) apart. Together they make up the section Hamatum. The inflated perianth tube suggest the species of the section Hamatum might be close relatives of those in the section Tumiditubus.

The species name harpagonatum is compounded from Latin the word harpago ("grappling hook") and the suffix -atum indicating the likeness of something, for the likeness of the flower head with a grappling hook.

== Distribution, habitat and ecology ==
L. harpagonatum is an endemic species that is restricted to a very small area in the northeast of the Riviersonderend Mountains near McGregor in the Western Cape province of South Africa, where it grows in mid-dry fynbos on sandy soil, at an altitude of approximately 800 m (2,600 ft).

The flowers are initially cream-colored, but change to carmine after pollination. The flowers do not smell, but a large amount of nectar gathers in the inflated perianth tube. Rodents chew on the perianth tube, presumably to help themselves to the nectar, and in doing so probably pollinate it. The fruits are collected by native ants for the pale edible elaiosome, which is eaten in the underground nest, where the seeds remain until they germinate after an overhead fire.

== Conservation ==
The McGregor pincushion is considered critically endangered, because there is only one population, consisting of about 200 specimens, that grows in an area of less than 2 km^{2}. The population is declining due to the harvesting of cut flowers, urban development, a too high frequency in which the local fynbos is burnt down and because an alien invasive ant species has forced out the native species, but contrary those native ants, does not bury the seeds, so these are unprotected against the fire.
