= Swart River =

Location
- Country: South Africa
- Province: Western Cape

Physical characteristics
- Source: north of Caledon

The Swart River is a river in the Western Cape, South Africa, which originates near Caledon, and flows southwest to where it joins the Bot River north of Hermanus.

== See also ==
- List of rivers of South Africa
- List of dams in South Africa
- List of drainage basins of South Africa
- Water Management Areas
