= Dwyka =

Dwyka may refer to:

- Dwyka River, a river in the Karoo region of South Africa
- Dwyka Group, a group of sedimentary geological formations in Southern Africa
