= CGR 5th Class 4-6-0 1891 =

Type of steam locomotive

CGR 5th Class 4-6-0 1891 OVGS 5th Class K 4-6-0 1891 South African Class 05 4-6-0 1891
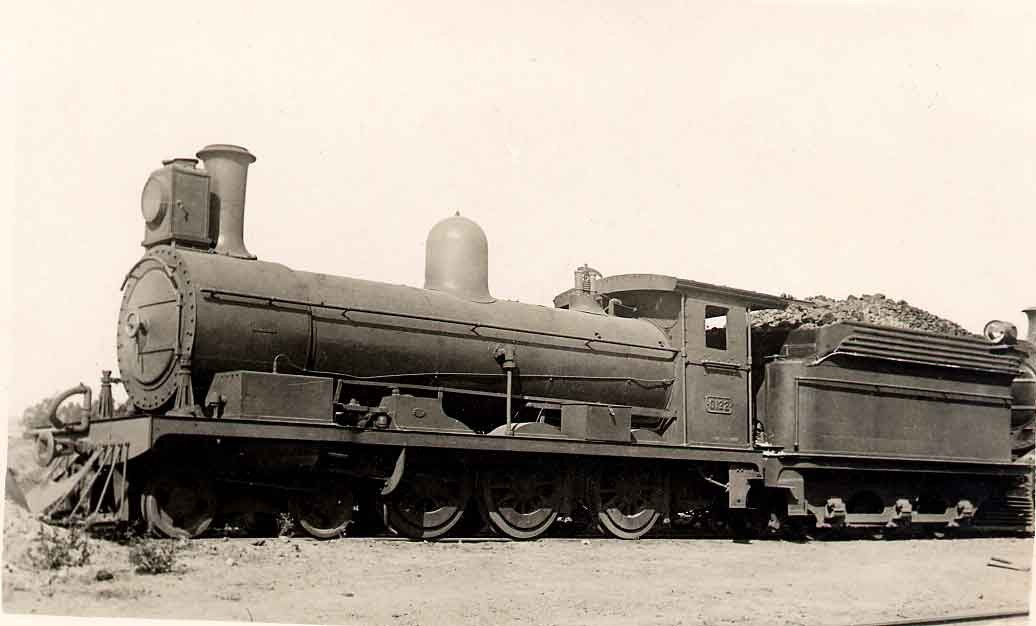
- CGR no. 122, SAR no. 0122, c. 1920
Type and origin
- Power type: Steam
- Designer: Cape Government Railways (Michael Stephens)
- Builder: Dübs and Company
- Serial number: 2712–2741
- Model: CGR 5th
- Build date: 1891
- Total produced: 30
Specifications
- Configuration
  - Whyte: 4-6-0 (Tenwheeler)
  - UIC: 2'Cn2
- Driver: 2nd coupled axle
- Gauge: 3 ft 6 in (1,067 mm) Cape gauge
- Leading dia.: 28 in (711 mm)
- Coupled dia.: 49 in (1,245 mm)
- Tender wheels: 37 inches (940 mm)
- Wheelbase: 40 ft 2 3/8 in (12,252 mm)
  - Axle spacing (Asymmetrical): 1–2: 4 ft 6 in (1,372 mm); 2–3: 5 ft 6 in (1,676 mm)
  - Engine: 19 ft 1 3/8 in (5,826 mm)
  - Leading: 5 ft (1,524 mm)
  - Coupled: 10 ft (3,048 mm)
  - Tender: 10 ft (3,048 mm)
- Length
  - Over couplers: 48 ft 1 3/4 in (14,675 mm)
- Height: 12 ft 1 1/2 in (3,696 mm)
- Axle load: 10 LT 8 cwt (10,570 kg)
  - Leading: 7 LT 15 cwt (7,874 kg)
  - 1st coupled: 10 LT 8 cwt (10,570 kg)
  - 2nd coupled: 10 LT 8 cwt (10,570 kg)
  - 3rd coupled: 9 LT 15 cwt (9,906 kg)
- Loco weight: 38 LT 6 cwt (38,910 kg)
- Tender weight: 28 LT 11 cwt (29,010 kg)
- Total weight: 66 LT 17 cwt (67,920 kg)
- Tender type: 3-axle
- Fuel type: Coal
- Fuel capacity: 4 LT (4.1 t)
- Water cap.: 1,950 imp gal (8,860 L)
- Firebox
  - Type: Round-top, as built Belpaire, by CSAR
  - Grate area: 16.18 sq ft (1.503 m^{2})
- Boiler
  - Pitch: 6 ft 4 1/2 in (1,943 mm)
  - Diameter: 4 ft (1,219 mm)
  - Tube plates: 11 ft 1 7/8 in (3,400 mm)
  - Small tubes: 185: 1 3/4 in (44 mm)
- Boiler pressure: 150 psi (1,034 kPa)
- Safety valve: Ramsbottom
- Heating surface
  - Firebox: 90.96 sq ft (8.450 m^{2})
  - Tubes: 946.32 sq ft (87.916 m^{2})
  - Total surface: 1,037.28 sq ft (96.366 m^{2})
- Cylinders: Two
- Cylinder size: 16 in (406 mm) bore 24 in (610 mm) stroke
- Valve gear: Stephenson
- Couplers: Johnston link-and-pin
Performance figures
- Tractive effort: 14,110 lbf (62.8 kN) @ 75%
Career
- Operators: Cape Government Railways; OVGS; New Cape Central Railway; Imperial Military Railways; Central South African Railways; South African Railways
- Class: CGR 5th Class, SAR Class 05
- Number in class: 30
- Numbers: Eastern 55–58; Midland 136–138 & 309–314; Western 117–118, 121–135
- Delivered: 1891
- First run: 1891
- Withdrawn: 1953

The Cape Government Railways 5th Class 4-6-0 of 1891 was a South African steam locomotive from the pre-Union era in the Cape of Good Hope.

In 1891, the Cape Government Railways placed a second batch of thirty 5th Class tender locomotives with a 4-6-0 Tenwheeler type wheel arrangement in mainline service on all three Cape Systems. They were similar to the previous batch of 1890, but differed in respect of the diameter of their coupled wheels, the length of their smokeboxes and their tractive effort.

== Manufacturer ==
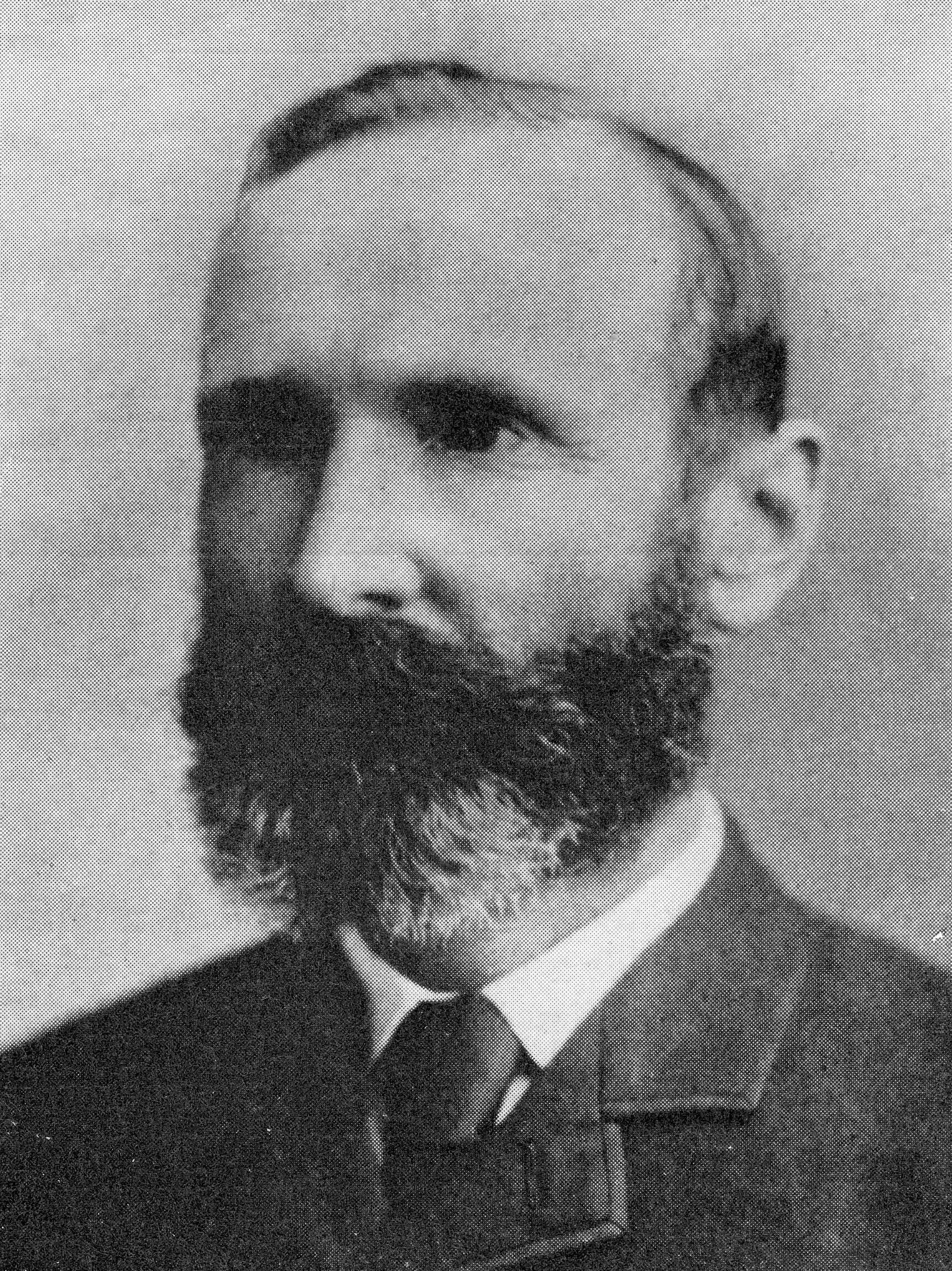
Michael Stephens

The second batch of Cape Government Railways (CGR) 5th Class 4-6-0 Tenwheeler type tender locomotives was delivered from Dübs and Company in 1891.

Of the thirty locomotives, four went to the Eastern System to work out of East London, numbered in the range from 55 to 58, nine went to the Midland System to work out of Port Elizabeth, numbered in the ranges from 136 to 138 and 309 to 314, and seventeen went to the Western System for service between Touws River and Beaufort West, numbered 117, 118 and in the range from 121 to 135.

The order had originally been for 36 locomotives. In 1891, a complete design for a new 7th Class 4-8-0 Mastodon type locomotive was prepared at the Salt River works in Cape Town. The last six locomotives of the order were cancelled and substituted with an order for six of these new 7th Class locomotives.

== Characteristics ==
While the 1891 locomotive was identical to the batch of 1890 in most respects, it differed in three aspects.

- It had larger coupled wheels with a 49 inches (1,240 millimetres) diameter, compared to the 46 inches (1,170 millimetres) of the earlier locomotives.
- As a result of the larger coupled wheels, its tractive effort was reduced from 15,030 to 14,110 pounds-force (66.9 to 62.8 kilonewtons) at 75% boiler pressure.
- It had a longer smokebox. On the 1890 locomotive, the chimney was so close to the front of the smokebox that the headlight had to be mounted on a platform attached to the front of the smokebox, while on the 1891 locomotive there was sufficient space ahead of the chimney to mount the huge headlight on top of the smokebox.

In the 1890s, some improvements to smokebox design took place. Extending the smokebox forward increased its volume. The increased amount of exhaust gases present in the smokebox had the effect of stabilising and improving the draught. The date of this improvement can be pinned to the introduction of this second batch of 5th Class locomotives with their lengthened smokeboxes. This had such a profound effect on the boiler's steaming ability that virtually every serving locomotive on the CGR and Natal Government Railways (NGR) had their smokeboxes extended.

== Service ==
=== Cape Government Railways ===
The 5th Class was considered to be the first really efficient all-round locomotive in the Cape of Good Hope. It was used on all kinds of traffic, wherever the mainline had severe gradients and curves.

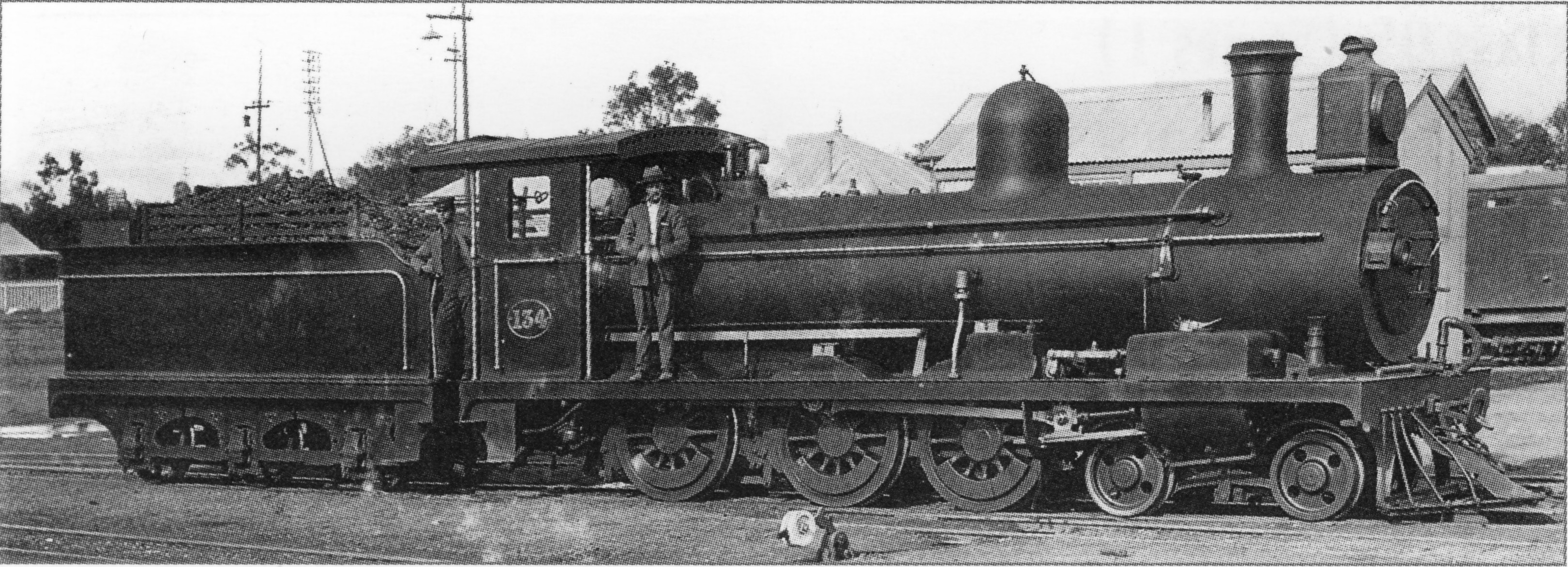
No. 134 with extended smokebox, c. 1910

At least one of the Western System's locomotives, no. 134, was modified by the CGR by having the smokebox extended even further forward to almost flush with the buffer beam. The reason for this modification is not known, but it was possibly done to make room for a spark arrester, as was done with the 4th Class 4-6-0TT of 1880 on the Eastern system.

=== Oranje-Vrijstaat Gouwerment-Spoorwegen ===
In late 1896, ten of these locomotives, six from the Midland System and four from the Western System, were sold to the newly established Oranje-Vrijstaat Gouwerment-Spoorwegen (OVGS) of the Orange Free State. On the OVGS, they were designated 5th Class K and renumbered in the range from 49 to 58.

=== New Cape Central Railway ===
The New Cape Central Railway (NCCR) was a private railway company which, by 1894, operated a branchline from Worcester via Robertson and Roodewal to Swellendam. In 1897, the Midland System's engine no. 136 was sold to the NCCR, where it was renumbered to no. 8.

=== Central South African Railways ===
During the Second Boer War, control of all railways in the Orange Free State and Transvaal was taken over by the Imperial Military Railways. At the end of the war in 1902, the ten ex-OVGS locomotives came onto the roster of the Central South African Railways (CSAR), where they were renumbered in the ranges from 315 to 317 and 326 to 332.

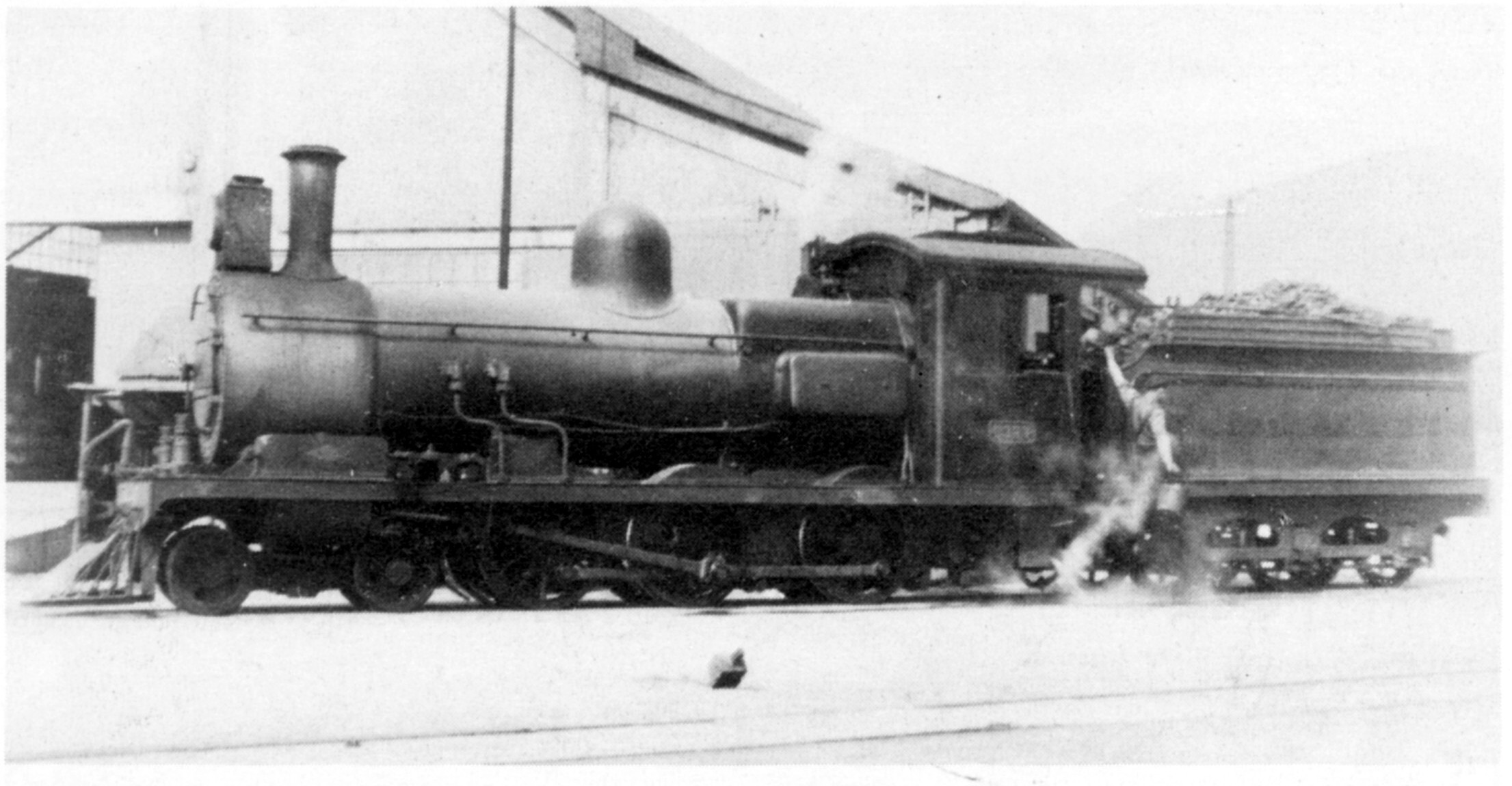
Reboilered CSAR no. 327, SAR no. 0327, c. 1920

In 1904, the CSAR reboilered three of these locomotives, no. 327, 328 and 329, with larger boilers with Belpaire fireboxes which were equipped with Drummond tubes. This involved the installation of cross-water tubes into the firebox, as featured on the London and South Western Railway's T9 Class and L11 Class, in an attempt to increase the heating surface area of the water, albeit at the cost of increased boiler complexity. Visible external evidence of the presence of Drummond tubes was the rectangular inspection covers which were attached to the sides of the firebox, just ahead of the cab.

The larger boilers and Drummond tubes increased their heating surface by 272.72 square feet (25.337 square metres) and, at a higher operating boiler pressure of 180 pounds per square inch (1,241 kilopascals), these three locomotives were able to easily haul the load of the next higher class. Since by then, however, these locomotives were being withdrawn from mainline traffic, no more reboilering was done.

=== South African Railways ===
When the Union of South Africa was established on 31 May 1910, the three Colonial government railways (CGR, NGR and Central South African Railways) were united under a single administration to control and administer the railways, ports and harbours of the Union. Although the South African Railways and Harbours came into existence in 1910, the actual classification and renumbering of all the rolling stock of the three constituent railways was only implemented with effect from 1 January 1912.

By 1912, twenty-five of these locomotives survived, nineteen on the CGR and six, including the three which had been reboilered, on the CSAR. They were considered obsolete by the South African Railways (SAR), designated Class 05 and renumbered by having the numeral "0" prefixed to their existing numbers.

During 1914, at the outbreak of the First World War, military planners followed the example set by the British invading forces during the Second Boer War and identified a requirement for armoured trains. For this purpose, five Class 05 locomotives were specially protected with armour plate and named Trafalgar, Scot, Erin, Karoo and Schrikmaker. The armour-plating was fitted by the workshops in Pretoria, Bloemfontein and Salt River. Their engine numbers are not known, nor whether they were from this Class or the Class 05 of 1890, or both.

In spite of being considered obsolete, some of the Class 05 locomotives survived as shunting engines in SAR service for another four decades, with some even getting reboilered while in SAR service. One confirmed example is no. 0138, which was still equipped with boiler no. 4825 of 1922 when it was withdrawn from service in 1953.

When they were eventually withdrawn from service in 1953, they were the last obsolete locomotives to be still in service.

== Works numbers ==
By 1896, all the locomotives of the Eastern System and one of the Midland System had been renumbered. The works numbers, CGR System, original numbers, renumbering and distribution of the Cape 5th Class of 1891 are listed in the table.

CGR 5th Class 4-6-0 of 1891
Works no.	CGR System	Orig. no.	1896 no.	1897 no.	1902 no.	SAR no.	Notes
2712	Western	117	117	117	117	0117	
2713	Western	118	118	118	118	0118	
2714	Western	121	121	121	121	0121	
2715	Western	122	122	122	122	0122	
2716	Western	123	123	123	123	0123	
2717	Western	124	124	124	124	0124	
2718	Western	125	125	49	326	0326	OVGS 49, CSAR 326
2719	Western	126	126	126	126	0126	
2720	Western	127	127	50	327	0327	OVGS 50. CSAR 327
2721	Midland	311	311	51	328	0328	OVGS 51, CSAR 328
2722	Western	129	129	129	129	0129	
2723	Western	130	130	130	130	0130	
2724	Midland	309	509	52	329	0329	OVGS 52, CSAR 329
2725	Midland	310	310	53	330		OVGS 53, CSAR 330
2726	Western	131	131	131	131	0131	
2727	Western	132	132	132	132	0132	
2728	Western	133	133	54	331		OVGS 54, CSAR 331
2729	Western	134	134	134	134	0134	
2730	Western	135	135	55	332	0332	OVGS 55, CSAR 332
2731	Midland	136	136	8	8	8	NCCR 8
2732	Eastern	55	651	651	651	0651	
2733	Eastern	56	652	652	652	0652	
2734	Western	128	128	128	128	0128	
2735	Midland	138	138	138	138	0138	Boiler 4825/1922
2736	Midland	137	137	137	137	0137	
2737	Eastern	57	653	653	653	0653	
2738	Eastern	58	654	654	654	0654	
2739	Midland	313	313	56	315		OVGS 56, CSAR 315
2740	Midland	312	312	57	316	0316	OVGS 57, CSAR 316
2741	Midland	314	314	58	317		OVGS 58, CSAR 317

== Illustration ==
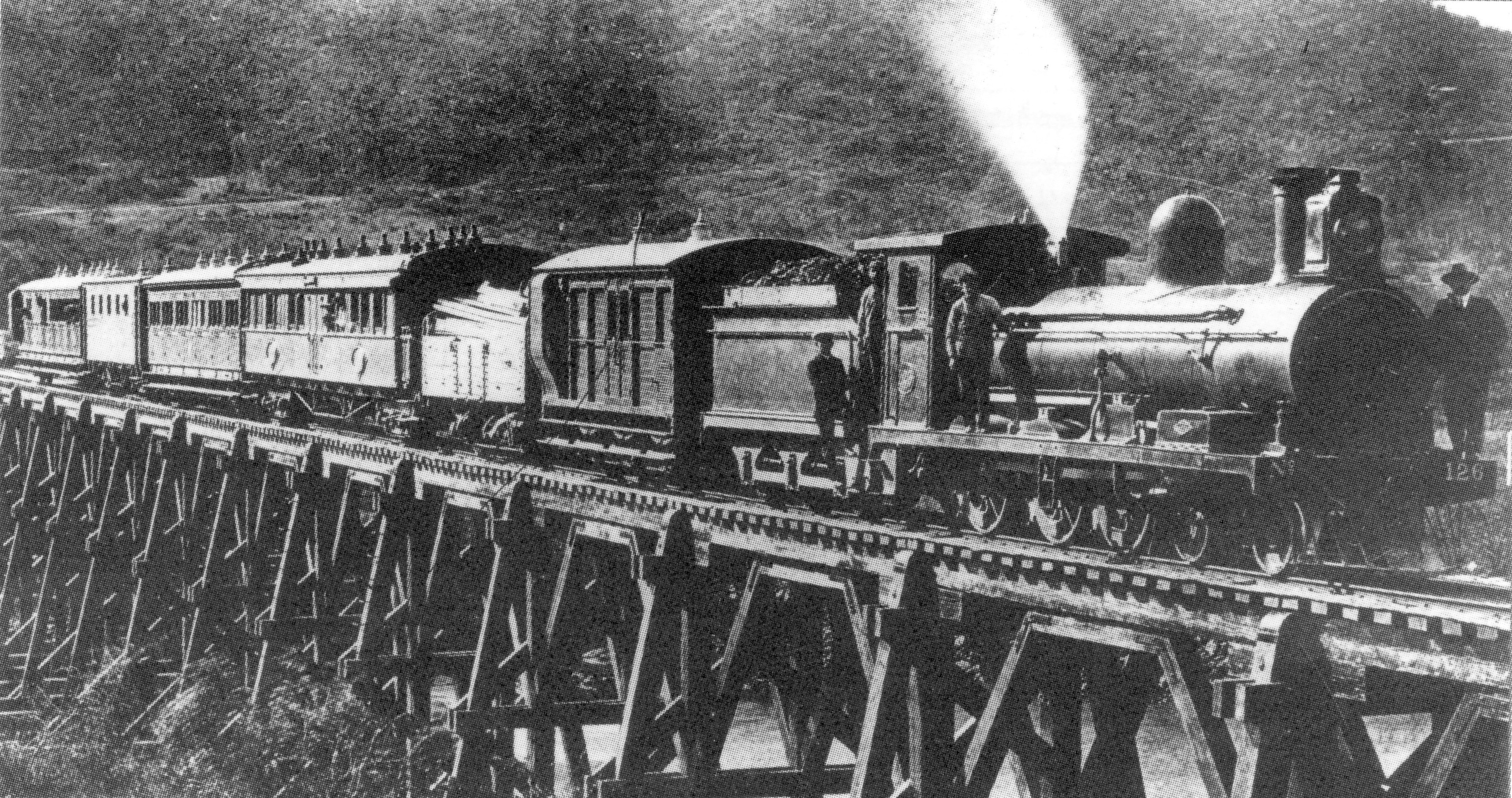
No. 128, later SAR no. 0128, on the old Kei River bridge, c. 1904

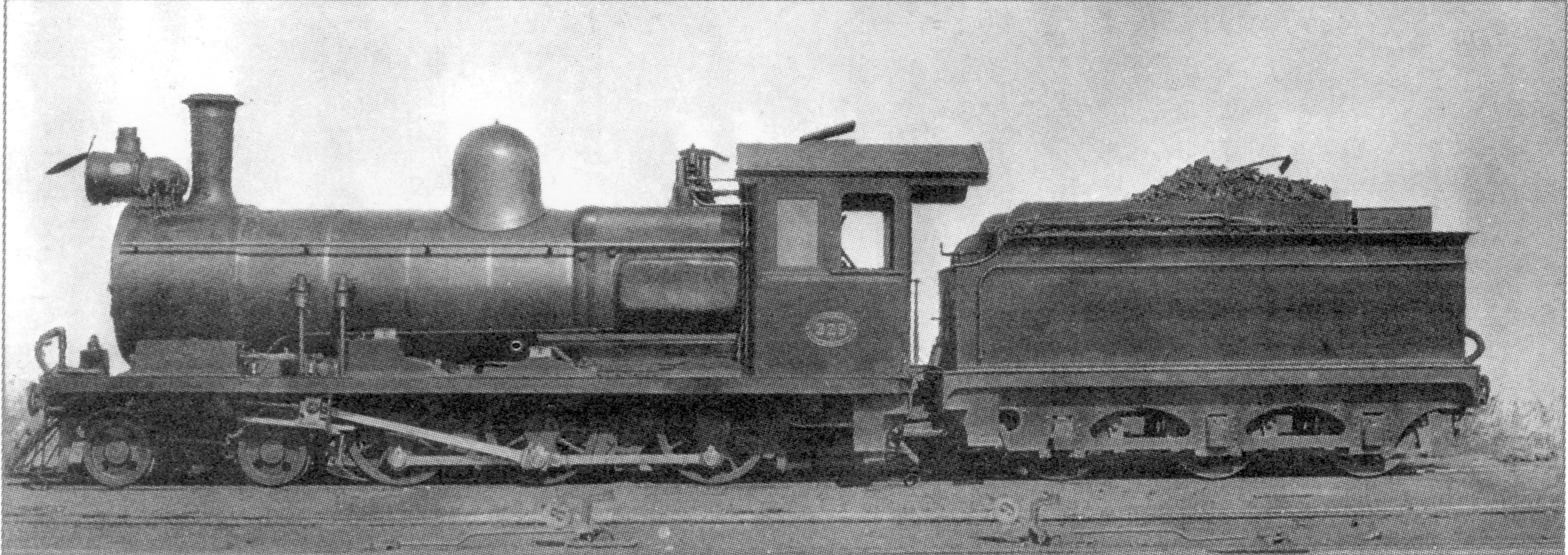
SAR no. 0329, ex no. 309, renumbered to 509, OVGS no. 52 and CSAR no. 329, with a Belpaire firebox, Drummond tubes and a new headlight, c. 1920
