= Thukela Water Management Area =

Thukela WMA, or Thukela Water Management Area (coded: 7), (also known as the Tugela WMA), Includes only the following major river: the Thukela River, and covers the following Dams:

- Craigie Burn Dam Mnyamvubu River
- Driel Barrage Tugela River
- Mearns Dam Mooi River
- Ntshingwayo Dam Ngagane River
- Spioenkop Dam Tugela River
- Wagendrift Dam Boesmans River
- Woodstock Dam Tugela River
- Zaaihoek Dam Slang River

== Boundaries ==
Primary drainage region V.
