= Berg Water Management Area =

Catchment area in the Western Cape, South Africa

Berg WMA, or Berg Water Management Area (coded: 19), Include the following major rivers: the Berg River, Diep River and Steenbras River, and covers the following Dams:

- Berg River Dam Berg River
- Misverstand Dam Berg River
- Lower Steenbras Dam Steenbras River
- Upper Steenbras Dam Steenbras River
- Voëlvlei Dam Voëlvlei River
- Wemmershoek Dam Wemmers River

== Boundaries ==
Tertiary drainage regions G10, G21, and G22 and quaternary catchment G40A with the northern boundary following the watershed between tertiary drainage regions G10 and G30 up to the town of Aurora. From Aurora the boundary runs directly to the coast in a westerly direction.

== See also ==
- Water Management Areas
- List of reservoirs and dams in South Africa
- List of rivers of South Africa
