= Streptomyces swartbergensis =

Scientific classification
- Domain: Bacteria
- Kingdom: Bacillati
- Phylum: Actinomycetota
- Class: Actinomycetia
- Order: Streptomycetales
- Family: Streptomycetaceae
- Genus: Streptomyces
- Species: S. swartbergensis

Binomial name
- Streptomyces swartbergensis Le Roes-Hill et al. 2018

Type strain
- HMC13

Species of bacterium

Streptomyces swartbergensis is a bacterium species from the genus of Streptomyces which has been isolated from soil from banks of the Gamka River from the Cape Province in South Africa. Streptomyces swartbergensis produces antibiotics.

== See also ==
- List of Streptomyces species
