= Klein River =

River in the Western Cape, South Africa

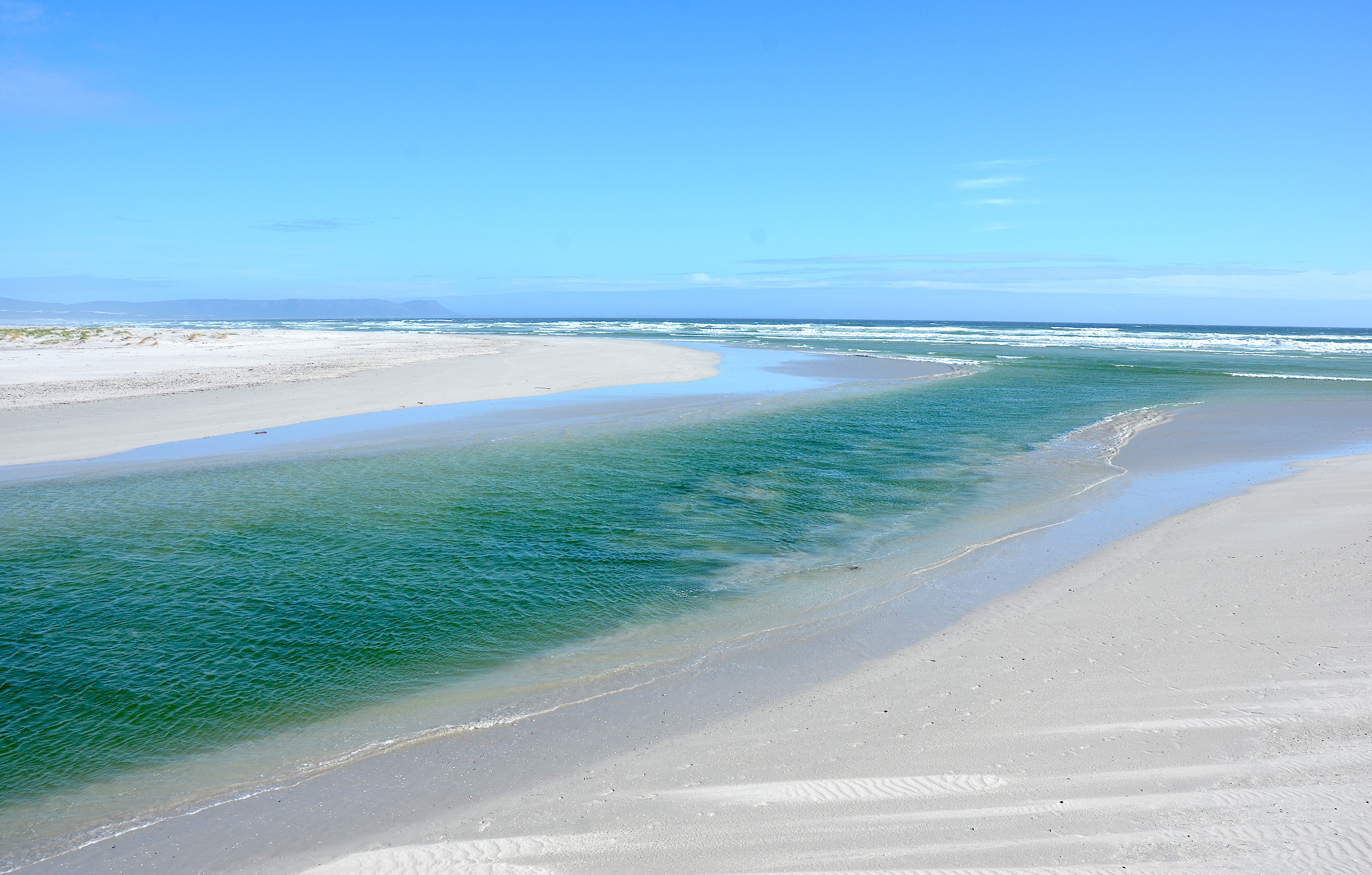

- Location within South Africa

Location
- Country: South Africa
- Province: Western Cape

Physical characteristics
- Source: _
- Mouth: Atlantic Ocean
  - location: Western Cape, South Africa
  - coordinates: 34°25′15″S 19°18′0″E
  - elevation: 0 m (0 ft)

Klein River is a river in the Western Cape province of South Africa. The river mouth is located at Hermanus. Its tributaries include the Karringmelk River. It falls within the Drainage system G.

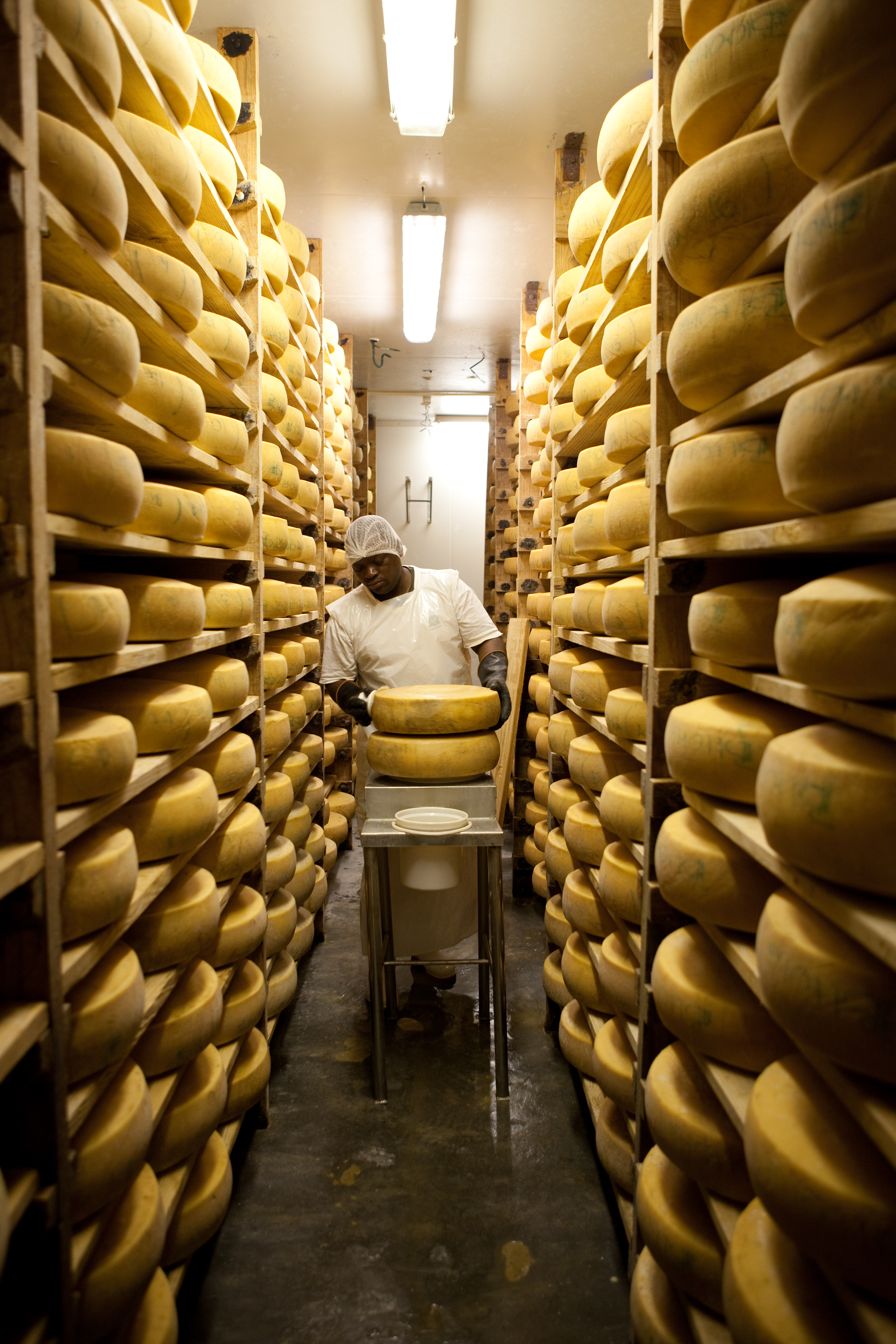
Klein River cheese

== See also ==
- List of rivers of South Africa
- List of drainage basins of South Africa
- Water Management Areas
