= CGR 5th Class 4-6-0 1890 =

Class of South African locomotives

CGR 5th Class 4-6-0 1890 OVGS 5th Class K 4-6-0 1890 South African Class 05 4-6-0 1890
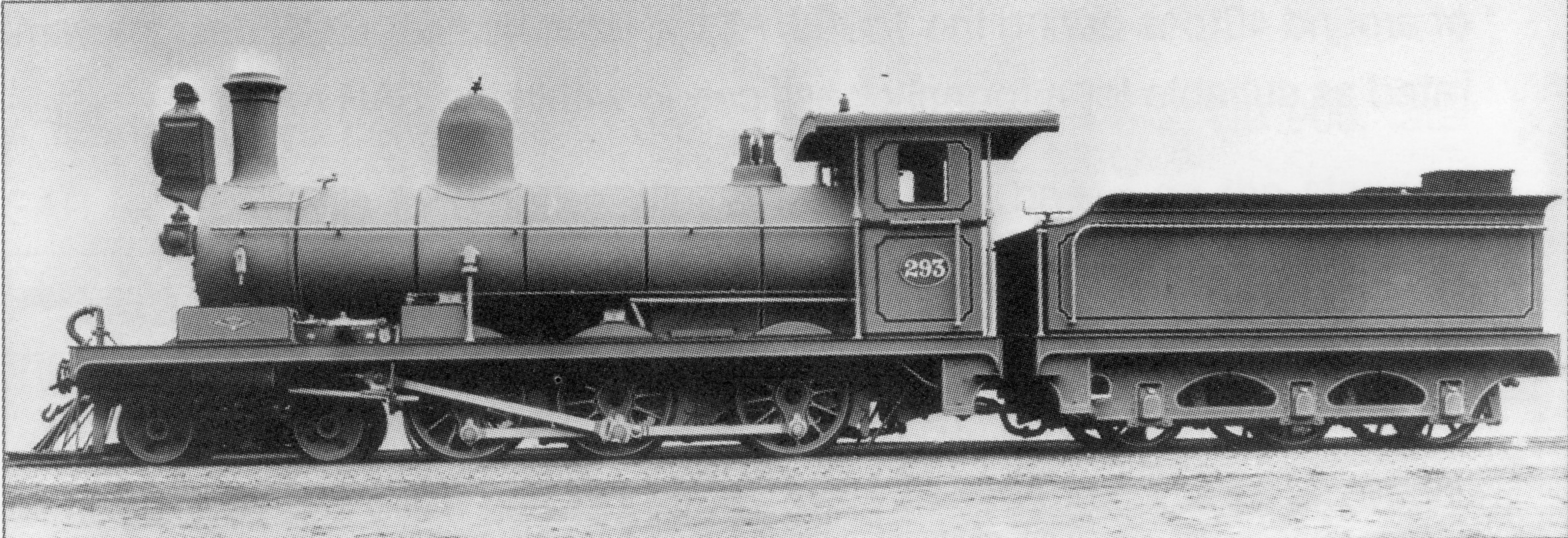
- Midland System no. 293, renumbered 493, then OVGS no. 42, CSAR no. 319 and SAR no. 0319, as built
Type and origin
- ♠ – Coupled wheels, as built ♥ – Coupled wheels, retyred
- Power type: Steam
- Designer: Cape Government Railways (Michael Stephens)
- Builder: Dübs and Company
- Serial number: 2664-2683
- Build date: 1890
- Total produced: 20
Specifications
- Configuration
  - Whyte: 4-6-0 (Tenwheeler)
  - UIC: 2'Cn2
- Driver: 2nd coupled axle
- Gauge: 3 ft 6 in (1,067 mm) Cape gauge
- Leading dia.: 28 in (711 mm)
- Coupled dia.: ♠ 46 in (1,168 mm) ♥ 49 in (1,245 mm)
- Tender wheels: 37 inches (940 mm)
- Wheelbase: 40 ft 2 3/8 in (12,252 mm)
  - Axle spacing (Asymmetrical): 1-2: 4 ft 6 in (1,372 mm); 2-3: 5 ft 6 in (1,676 mm)
  - Engine: 19 ft 1 3/8 in (5,826 mm)
  - Leading: 5 ft (1,524 mm)
  - Coupled: 10 ft (3,048 mm)
  - Tender: 10 ft (3,048 mm)
- Length
  - Over couplers: 48 ft 1 3/4 in (14,675 mm)
- Height: 12 ft 1 1/2 in (3,696 mm)
- Axle load
  - Leading: 7 LT 15 cwt (7,874 kg)
  - 1st coupled: 10 LT 8 cwt (10,570 kg)
  - 2nd coupled: 10 LT 8 cwt (10,570 kg)
  - 3rd coupled: 9 LT 15 cwt (9,906 kg)
- Loco weight: 38 LT 6 cwt (38,910 kg)
- Tender weight: 28 LT 11 cwt (29,010 kg)
- Total weight: 66 LT 17 cwt (67,920 kg)
- Tender type: 3 axle
- Fuel type: Coal
- Fuel capacity: 4 LT (4.1 t)
- Water cap.: 1,950 imp gal (8,860 L)
- Firebox
  - Type: Round-top
  - Grate area: 16.18 sq ft (1.503 m^{2})
- Boiler
  - Pitch: 6 ft 4 1/2 in (1,943 mm)
  - Diameter: 4 ft (1,219 mm)
  - Tube plates: 11 ft 1 7/8 in (3,400 mm)
  - Small tubes: 185: 1 3/4 in (44 mm)
- Boiler pressure: 150 psi (1,034 kPa)
- Safety valve: Ramsbottom
- Heating surface
  - Firebox: 90.96 sq ft (8.450 m^{2})
  - Tubes: 946.32 sq ft (87.916 m^{2})
  - Total surface: 1,037.28 sq ft (96.366 m^{2})
- Cylinders: Two
- Cylinder size: 16 in (406 mm) bore 24 in (610 mm) stroke
- Valve gear: Stephenson
- Couplers: Johnston link-and-pin
Performance figures
- Tractive effort: ♠ 15,030 lbf (66.9 kN) @ 75% ♥ 14,110 lbf (62.8 kN) @ 75%
Career
- Operators: Cape Government Railways; OVGS; Imperial Military Railways; Central South African Railways; South African Railways
- Class: CGR 5th Class, SAR Class 05
- Number in class: 20
- Numbers: Midland 291-308, Western 119-120
- Delivered: 1890
- First run: 1890
- Withdrawn: 1953

The Cape Government Railways 5th Class 4-6-0 of 1890 was a South African steam locomotive from the pre-Union era in the Cape of Good Hope.

In 1890, the Cape Government Railways placed twenty 5th Class tender locomotives with a 4-6-0 Tenwheeler type wheel arrangement in mainline service on its Midland and Western Systems.

== Manufacturer ==
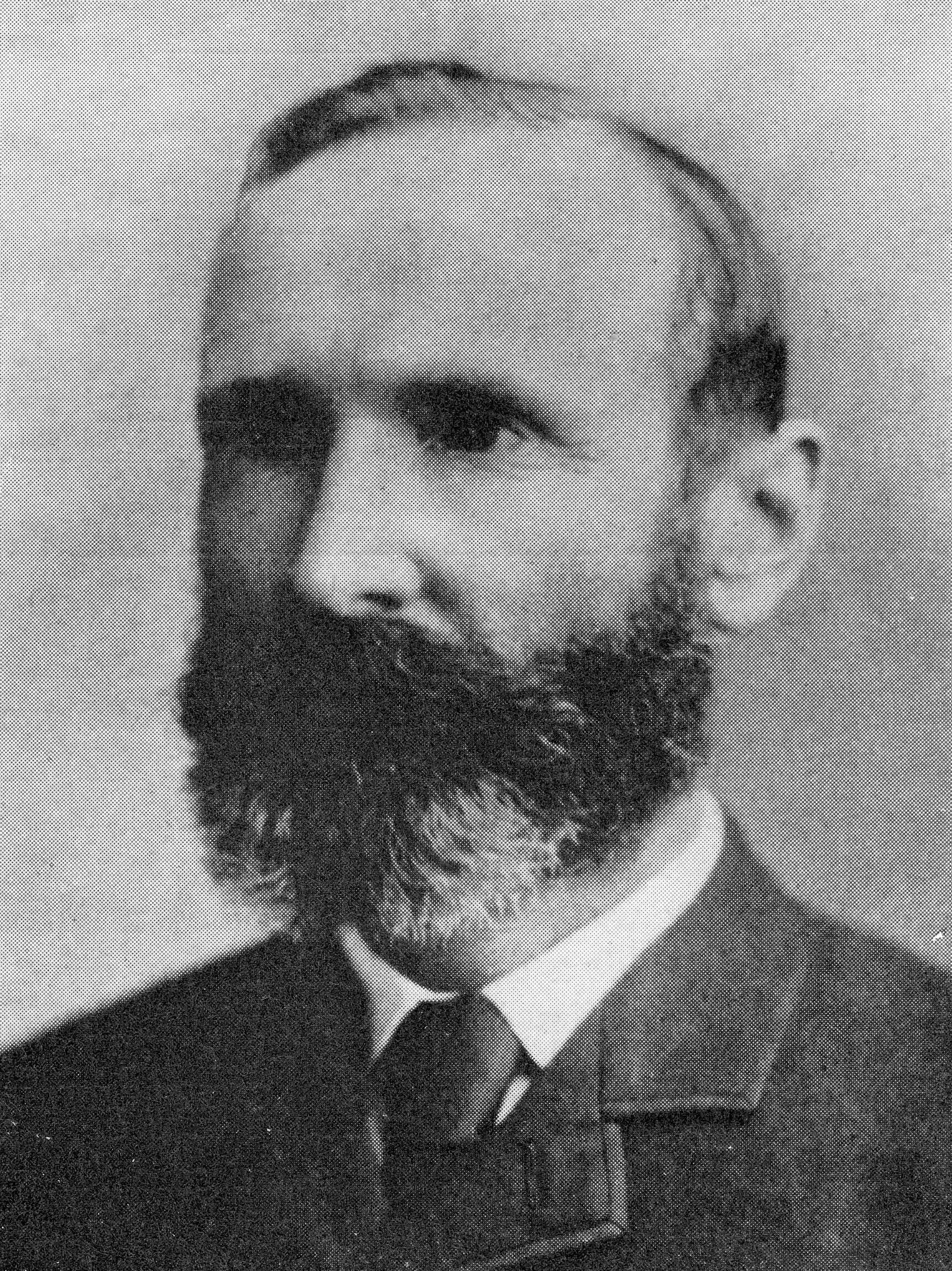
Michael Stephens

Twenty 5th Class 4-6-0 Tenwheeler type tender locomotives were delivered to the Cape Government Railways (CGR) from Dübs and Company in 1890. The locomotive was designed by Michael Stephens, Locomotive Superintendent of the Western System of the CGR, and was built to detailed designs prepared by the Salt River drawing office in Cape Town. Of the twenty locomotives in the Class, eighteen went to the Midland System to work out of Port Elizabeth, numbered in the range from 291 to 308. The other two, numbered 119 and 120, went to the Western System for service in the Karoo on the section between Touws River and Beaufort West.

== Characteristics ==
The locomotive was a larger and improved version of the earlier 4th Class 4-6-0 tank-and-tender locomotive. As built, it had 46 inches (1,168 millimetres) diameter coupled wheels which were later retyred to a diameter of 49 inches (1,245 millimetres).

Compared to the second batch of 5th Class locomotives which were to be delivered a year later in 1891, it had a short smokebox on which the chimney was so close to the front of the smokebox that the headlight had to be mounted on a platform, attached to the front of the smokebox. The smokeboxes were later extended to suit South Africa's low-grade coal and to make room for wire-netting spark arresters.

The boilers had an operating pressure of 150 pounds per square inch (1,034 kilopascals) and were equipped with Ramsbottom safety valves.

== Service ==
=== Cape Government Railways ===
The 5th Class proved to be very useful engines and were considered the first really efficient all-round locomotives in the Cape of Good Hope. They were used wherever the mainline had severe gradients and curves. Because of their greater power, the older 4th Class locomotives were gradually relegated to secondary duties.

=== Oranje-Vrijstaat Gouwerment-Spoorwegen ===
In late 1896, eight of the Midland System's locomotives were sold to the newly established Oranje-Vrijstaat Gouwerment-Spoorwegen (OVGS), where they were designated 5th Class K and renumbered in the range from 41 to 48.

=== Central South African Railways ===
During the Second Boer War, control of all railways in the Orange Free State was taken over by the Imperial Military Railways. At the end of the war in 1902, the eight ex-OVGS locomotives came onto the roster of the Central South African Railways (CSAR), where they were renumbered in the range from 318 to 325.

In 1904, the CSAR reboilered two of these locomotives, numbers 319 and 322, with larger boilers and Belpaire fireboxes which were equipped with Drummond tubes. This increased their heating surface by 272.72 square feet (25.337 square metres) and, at a higher operating boiler pressure of 180 pounds per square inch (1,241 kilopascals), these two locomotives were able to easily haul the load of the next higher class. Since, by then, these locomotives were being withdrawn from mainline traffic, no more reboilering was done.

=== South African Railways ===
When the Union of South Africa was established on 31 May 1910, the three Colonial government railways, the CGR, the Natal Government Railways and the CSAR, were united under a single administration to control and administer the railways, ports and harbours of the Union. Although the South African Railways and Harbours came into existence in 1910, the actual classification and renumbering of all the rolling stock of the three constituent railways was only implemented with effect from 1 January 1912.

By 1912, sixteen of these locomotives survived, twelve on the CGR and four, including the two which had been reboilered, on the CSAR. They were considered obsolete by the South African Railways (SAR), designated Class 05 and renumbered by having the numeral 0 prefixed to their existing numbers.

During 1914, at the outbreak of the First World War, military planners followed the example set by the British invading forces during the Second Boer War and identified a requirement for armoured trains. For this purpose, five Class 05 locomotives were specially protected with armour plate and named Trafalgar, Scot, Erin, Karoo and Schrikmaker. The armour-plating was fitted by the workshops in Pretoria, Bloemfontein and Salt River. Their engine numbers are not known, nor whether they were from this Class or the Class 05 of 1891 or both.

In spite of being considered obsolete, some of the Class 05 locomotives survived as shunting engines in SAR service for another four decades, with some even getting reboilered while in SAR service. One confirmed example is no. 0506, which was still equipped with boiler no. 7244 of 1924 when it was withdrawn from service in the 1950s.

When they were eventually withdrawn in 1953, the Class 05 locomotives were the last of the obsolete engines to be still in SAR service.

== Works numbers ==
The works numbers, CGR System, original numbers, renumbering and distribution of the Cape 5th Class of 1890 are listed in the table.

CGR 5th Class 4-6-0 of 1890
Works no.	CGR System	Orig. no.	1896 no.	1897 no.	1902 no.	SAR no.	Notes
2664	Midland	291	491	491	491	0491	
2665	Midland	292	492	41	318		OVGS 41, CSAR 318
2666	Midland	293	493	42	319	0319	OVGS 42, CSAR 319
2667	Midland	294	494	43	320		OVGS 43, CSAR 320
2668	Midland	295	495	495	495	0495	
2669	Midland	296	496	496	496	0496	
2670	Midland	297	497	497	497	0497	
2671	Midland	298	498	498	498	0498	
2672	Midland	299	499	44	321		OVGS 44, CSAR 321
2673	Midland	300	500	500	500	0500	
2674	Midland	301	501	45	322	0322	OVGS 45, CSAR 322
2675	Midland	302	502	502	502	0502	
2676	Midland	303	503	46	323	0323	OVGS 46, CSAR 323
2677	Midland	304	504	47	324		OVGS 47, CSAR 324
2678	Midland	305	505	48	325	0325	OVGS 48, CSAR 325
2679	Midland	306	506	506	506	0506	Boiler 7244/1924
2680	Western	119	119	119	119	0119	
2681	Western	120	120	120	120	0120	
2682	Midland	307	507	507	507	0507	
2683	Midland	308	508	508	508	0508	

== Illustration ==
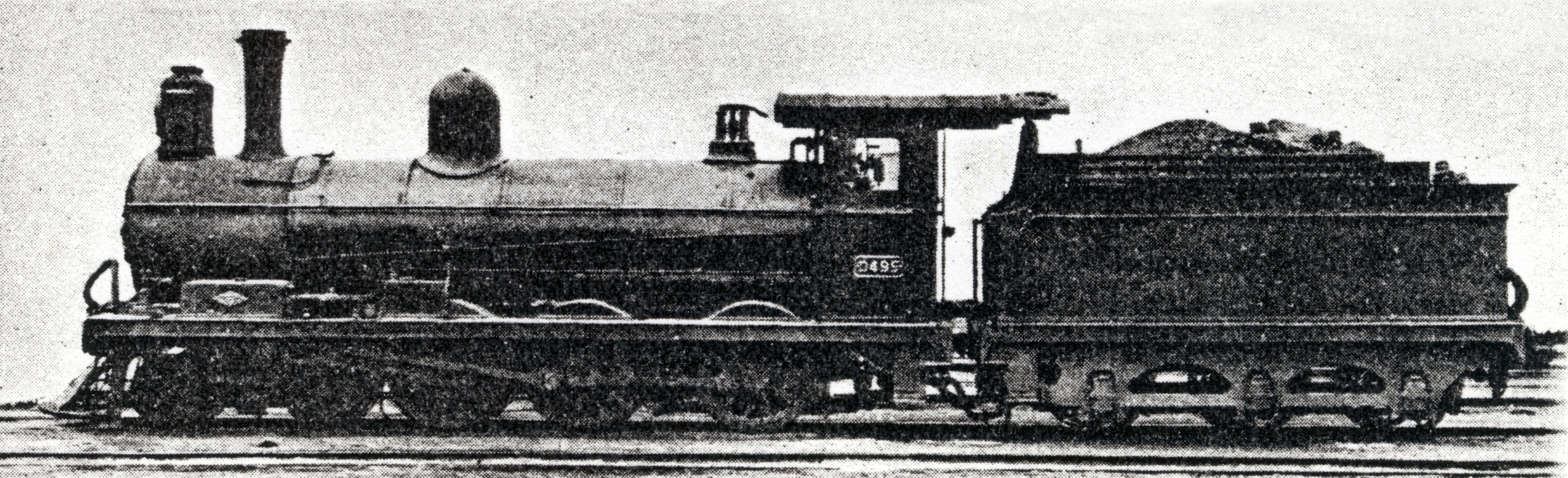
Midland System no. 295, renumbered 495, then SAR no. 0495, with extended smokebox, c. 1912
