= Alvania argentea =

Scientific classification
- Kingdom: Animalia
- Phylum: Mollusca
- Class: Gastropoda
- Subclass: Caenogastropoda
- Order: Littorinimorpha
- Superfamily: Rissooidea
- Family: Rissoidae
- Genus: Alvania
- Species: A. argentea

Binomial name
- Alvania argentea (Monterosato, 1877)

Synonyms
- Rissoa (Alvania) argentea G. B. Sowerby III, 1892 · alternate representation (basionym); Rissoa argentea G. B. Sowerby III, 1892 (Alvania accepted as full genus)

Species of gastropod

Alvania argentea is a species of small sea snail, a marine gastropod mollusk or micromollusk in the family Rissoidae.

== Description ==
The length of the shell attains 3 mm to 4.7 mm.

(Original description) The acuminate-ovate shell is imperforate. The shell contains six convex whorls. It is a beautiful little shining silvery shell, not regularly latticed like Alvania fenestrata, but with the spiral ridges much more prominent than the longitudinal plaits, which are numerous and visible only on the upper half of the whorls. The body whorl is slightly inflated. The aperture is ovate. The columella is arcuate.

== Distribution ==
This marine species occurs off Port Elizabeth, South Africa.
