= Margaret Maritz =

South African longevity claimant (died 2025)

- Born: 27 September 1906 (claimed); Sutherland, Cape Colony
- Died: 29 July 2025; Touws River, South Africa
- Known for: Supercentenarian claimant

Margaret Maritz (died 29 July 2025) was a South African supercentenarian who claimed to be born on 27 September 1906, which would have made her the world's oldest person.

== Biography ==
Margaret claimed to have been born in Sutherland in the Cape Colony (now the Northern Cape) on 27 September 1906. She lived in the Breede River Valley in the Western Cape for most of her life.

Maritz latterly resided in Touws River. Her age has not been verified, and if her claim was legitimate, she would have been older than the world's verified oldest person, Ethel Caterham.

Maritz died in Touws River on 29 July 2025, at the claimed age of 118.
