= Lower Orange Water Management Area =

Lower Orange WMA, or Lower Orange Water Management Area (coded: 14), Includes the following major rivers: the Ongers River, Hartbees River and Orange River, and covers the following Dams:

- Boegoeberg Dam Orange River
- Douglas Storage Weir Vaal River

== Boundaries ==
Primary drainage region F (excluding tertiary drainage region F60), tertiary drainage regions D33, D42 (excluding portions of quaternary catchments D42Cand D42D), D51 to D58, D61, D62, D71 to D73 (excluding quaternary catchment D73A and portions of D73B, D73C, D73D and D73E), D81, D82, and quaternary catchment C92C.

== See also ==
- Water Management Areas
- List of reservoirs and dams in South Africa
- List of rivers of South Africa
