= Inkomati Water Management Area =

Inkomati WMA, or Inkomati Water Management Area (coded: 5), in South Africa is situated in the north-eastern part of South Africa in the Mpumalanga Province, with a small area in the Limpopo Province. It borders on Mozambique in the east and on Swaziland in the south-east. The water management area extends over several parallel river catchments which all drain in a general easterly direction, and flow together at the border with Mozambique or within Mozambique, to form the Incomati River which discharges into the Indian Ocean immediately north of Maputo. A special situation is presented by the Komati River, the most southern tributary of the Incomati River, which rises in South Africa and flows into Swaziland, then re-enters South Africa where it is joined by the Crocodile River at the border with Mozambique, before flowing into Mozambique as the Incomati River. The Sabie River is the other main river in the water management area and flows into Corumuna Dam in Mozambique just downstream of the border with South Africa, and upstream of its confluence with the Inkomati River.

== Topographical features ==
The most important topographical feature in the Inkomati water management area is the Great Escarpment, which divides the water management area into the Plateau area in the west (elevation of more than 2 000 m above sea level) and the Lowveld in the east. Largely attributable to the topography, distinct differences in climate occur, from temperate Highveld in the west to sub-tropical in the eastern Lowveld. Rainfall is strongly seasonal and occurs mainly in summer. Light snow occasionally falls in the vicinity of the southwestern divide in winter. The mean annual rainfall is in the range from 400 mm to 1 000 mm over most of the water management area, reaching close to 1 500 mm in the mountainous areas along the escarpment. The north-eastern part of the water management area falls within the world-renowned Kruger National Park. The Sabie River which flows through the park, is one of the ecologically most important rivers in the country, whilst the Crocodile River forms the southern border to the park. Several private game reserves adjoin the Kruger National Park, with other conservation areas throughout in the water management area.

== Sub-management areas ==
4 sub-management area are made, they are:

- 1) The Komati West sub-management area (West of Swaziland), comprising the portion of the Komati River catchment to the west of Swaziland.
- 2) The Komati North sub-management area (North of Swaziland), which includes the portion of the Komati River catchment north of Swaziland to the confluence of the Crocodile River.
- 3) The Crocodile sub-management area, which corresponds to the catchment of the Crocodile River.
- 4) The Sabie sub-management area, which includes the catchment of the Sabie River together with the Massintonto River and the Nwanetsi River catchments to the north.

== Dams Included ==
The WMA Includes the following major rivers: the Nwanedzi River, Sabie River, Crocodile (East) River and Komati River, and covers the following Dams:

- Da Gama Dam White Waters River
- Driekoppies Dam Lomati River
- Inyaka Dam Marite River
- Kwena Dam Krokodil River
- Maguga Dam Komati River
- Nooitgedacht Dam Komati River
- Vygeboom Dam Komati River
- Witklip Dam Sand River

== Boundaries ==
Primary drainage region X.

== See also ==
- Water Management Areas
- List of reservoirs and dams in South Africa
- List of rivers of South Africa
