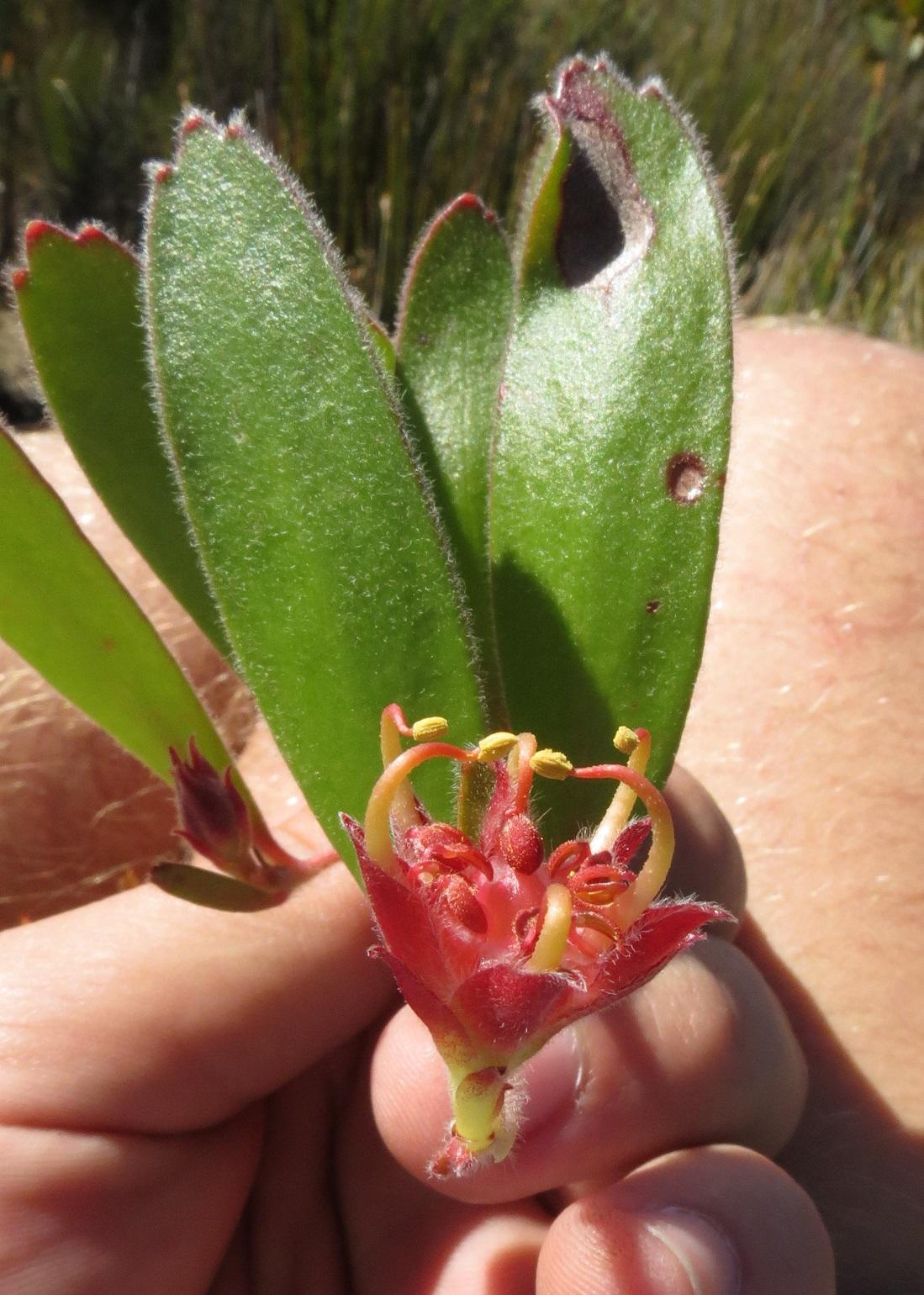

Conservation status
- Endangered (IUCN 3.1)

Scientific classification
- Kingdom: Plantae
- Clade: Embryophytes
- Clade: Tracheophytes
- Clade: Angiosperms
- Clade: Eudicots
- Order: Proteales
- Family: Proteaceae
- Genus: Leucospermum
- Species: L. hamatum

Binomial name
- Leucospermum hamatum Rourke

= Leucospermum hamatum =

Species of plant from the Western Cape of South Africa

Leucospermum hamatum is a mat-forming, evergreen shrublet of only about 10 cm (3.9 in) high, from the Proteaceae. It is usually 1–3 m (3.3–9.8 ft) in diameter, has long trailing stems and upright, inverted lance-shaped, entire leaves but for one to five shallow reddish bony teeth near the tip. Its small flower heads of 1½–2 cm (0.6–0.8 in) in diameter, consist of four to seven drab carmine-colored flowers that strongly curve back to the centre of the head. It mainly flowers from July till November and is pollinated by mice. It has been given the common name Ruitersbos pincushion.

== Description ==
Leucospermum hamatum is a crawling low shrub of no more than 10 cm (3.9 in) high that can form dense mats of 1–3 m (3.3–9.8 ft) in diameter, with stout branches of up to 2½ cm (1 in) thick that stretch out along ground and originate from a central stout trunk of up to 4½ cm (1.8 in) thick. The flowering branches are slim, trailing along the ground, frequently divided in two, about 2 mm (0.079 in) thick, with very few soft long hairs, mostly with one flower head at the tip of the branches and several in the axils of the furthest leaves. The leaves are alternately set, upright, narrowly oblong to oblong-elliptic, 4½–6½ cm (1.8–2.6 in) long and 8–18 mm (0.31–0.71 in) wide, set on a leaf stalk of up to ½ cm (0.2 in) long. Near the leaf tip are usually about three teeth, sometime the margin is wholly entire. The surface of the leaf is initially slightly powdery, but this is lost later on.

The flower head is 1½–2 cm (0.6–0.8 in) in diameter and consists of four to seven flowers in one whorl set on a stalk of 1–2 cm (0.4–0.8 in) long. Three or four lance-shaped involucral bracts of 7–10 mm (0.28–0.39 in) long with a pointy or pointed tip subtend the flower head or are entirely absent. The bracteole that is subtending the individual flower is 1–1½ cm (0.4–0.6 in) long and 4–6 mm (0.16–0.24 in) wide, oval in circumference with a pointy tip, sharply folded at the midvein and embracing the foot of the perianth, with a slightly powdery surface and a row of fine hairs around the rim. The perianth is very strongly curved toward the center of the flower head, 10–14 mm (0.39–0.55 in) in long. In the lower part of the perianth, the four lobes are fused into a tube which is much inflated towards its end, up to ½ cm (0.2 in) in diameter, without hairs. The middle part that consists of the claws is wide near the base, narrow near the tip and strongly coiled at anthesis. The three perianth lobes facing toward the center of the flower head and sideways are incompletely fused and about 4 mm (0.16 in) long, the free lobe facing the rim of the flower head is 5–6 mm (0.20–0.24 in) long. The outer surface is hairless, but where the tube splits in four, the margins have a row of woolly hairs. The four anthers are directly attached to the 2 mm (0.08 in) long upper part of the perianth by a swollen fleshy connection. The style that is 1¾–2 cm (0.7–0.8 in) long is very strongly bent (about 180°) towards the center of the flower head, and nearer to its tip both tapers and is set with stiff hairs facing towards the base, changing to coarsely powdery further toward the base. It is topped by a slight thickening called pollen presenter, which has a cone-shape with a pointy tip, is about 2 mm (0.08 in) long, with a groove at the very end that acts as the stigma. The ovary of about 1 mm (0.04 in) long, gradually merges into the style, has a fine powdery surface. It is subtended by four nectar producing blunt line-shaped scales of about 2 mm (0.08 in) long. The fruit is a cylindric, greyish-white achene, with a fine powdery surface and a central indent at its base.

The subtribe Proteinae, to which the genus Leucospermum has been assigned, consistently has a basic chromosome number of twelve (2n=24).

== Taxonomy ==
L. hamatum was named and described by John Patrick Rourke in 1983. The species name hamatum is derived from the Latin word meaning "hooked" and refers to the barbs near the tip of the styles. L. hamatum is the type species of the section Hamatum.

== Distribution, habitat and ecology ==
Leucospermum hamatum is only known from one location on the Klein Moeras River Farm, in the northern foothills of the Outeniqua Mountains, in the catchment area of the Moordkuils River. In August 1982, more than a thousand specimens were found here, in an area of several hectares, at approximately 750 m (2,460 ft) elevation. In areas where wildfire had recently raged, only seedlings were found. Position and inconspicuousness of the flower heads make it unlikely that it is pollinated by either birds or insects. Instead, it is assumed that small rodents pollinate the flowers. A relatively large amount of nectar accumulates in the bladder-like perianth tubes.

== Conservation ==
The Ruitersbos pincushion is considered endangered. Only five small subpopulations are known, spread over an area of about 20 km^{2} (7.7 sq mi). It may be threatened by the invasive Hakea, which has been removed from the direct neighborhood of L. hamatum, but which may spread again if it is not managed.
