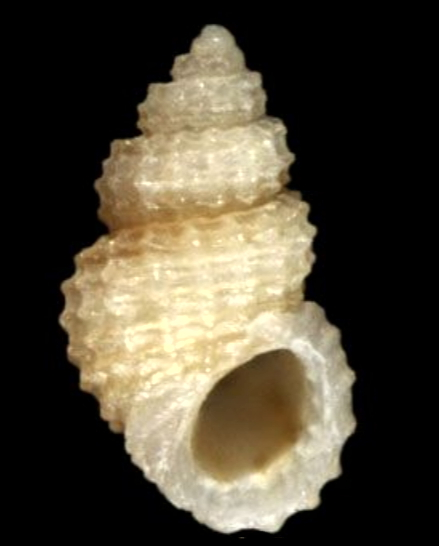
- Shell of Alvania fenestrata (specimen at the Natural History Museum, Rotterdam)

Scientific classification
- Kingdom: Animalia
- Phylum: Mollusca
- Class: Gastropoda
- Subclass: Caenogastropoda
- Order: Littorinimorpha
- Superfamily: Rissooidea
- Family: Rissoidae
- Genus: Alvania
- Species: A. fenestrata

Binomial name
- Alvania fenestrata (Krauss, 1848)

Synonyms
- Rissoa fenestrata Krauss, 1848 (original combination); Rissoina fenestrata Schwarz, 1910

= Alvania fenestrata =

Species of gastropod

Alvania fenestrata is a species of small sea snail, a marine gastropod mollusk or micromollusk in the family Rissoidae.

== Description ==
The length of the shell attains 4 mm, its diameter 2 mm.

The smooth protoconch consists of three whorls, forming a conical apex. There are three postnatal whorls. The sculpture consists of 16-18 axial riblets that continue across the base. There are two spiral lirae on Ist and 2nd whorls, 3 on 3rd. The intersections are nodulose. The base of the shell contains three spiral lirae.

== Distribution ==
This species occurs off the coast of KwaZulu-Natal, South Africa.

Fossils were found in Pleistocene strata in the Little Brak River, South Africa.
