= Olifants/Doorn Water Management Area =

Olifants/Doorn WMA, or Olifants/Doorn Water Management Area, Includes the following major rivers: the Olifants River, Doorn River, Krom River, Sand River, and Sout River, and covers the following dams:

- Bulshoek Dam Olifants River
- Clanwilliam Dam Olifants River
- Karee Dam Karee River

== Boundaries ==
Primary drainage region E and tertiary drainage regions G30 and F60.

== See also ==
- Water Management Areas
- List of reservoirs and dams in South Africa
- List of rivers of South Africa
