= Touws River (river) =

River in the Western Cape, South Africa

Touws River Touwsrivier
- Location within South Africa

Location
- Country: South Africa
- Province: Western Cape
- City: Touws River (town)

Physical characteristics
- Source: Matroosberg
  - location: Hex River Mountains
  - coordinates: 33°21′S 19°38′E
  - elevation: 1,300 m (4,300 ft)
- Mouth: Groot River
  - coordinates: 33°44′12″S 21°10′55″E
  - elevation: 239 m (784 ft)

The Touws River (Afrikaans: Touwsrivier) is a river in the Western Cape province of South Africa. It is a tributary of the Groot River, part of the Gourits River basin.

== Name ==
The name "Touws" originates from a Khoi word for ash, which also referred to the local "Ash-bushes" (Salsola aphylla). It is uncertain whether the name originally referred to the bushes, or to the colour of the river (historically, the Touws river was occasionally known as the "Ash river").

It also gave its name to the town of Touws River, which lies on the upper reaches of this river.

== Course ==
It sources are in the Matroosberg, Hex River Mountains, near the town of De Doorns. In its upper course it is known as the Smalblaar and the Donkies.

Flowing in a southeastern direction, it flows past Touws River town, meeting the right bank of the Groot River after briefly turning southwards. Its tributaries include the Brand, Kalee, Brak, Slang and the Kruis; all are minor rivers.

The Touws is part of the Gouritz Water Management Area and falls within the Drainage system J.

== Dams ==
- Verkeerdevlei Dam (capacity 5,500,000 cubic metres (190,000,000 cu ft))

== See also ==
- List of rivers of South Africa
- List of drainage basins of South Africa
- Water Management Areas
