= Zaaihoek Dam =

- Interactive map of Zaaihoek Dam
- Official name: Zaaihoek Dam
- Location: Kwazulu-Natal, South Africa
- Coordinates: 27°26′1″S 30°4′30″E
- Opening date: 1988
- Operators: Department of Water Affairs and Forestry

Dam and spillways
- Type of dam: gravity
- Impounds: Slang River
- Height: 43.5 m
- Length: 527 m

Reservoir
- Creates: Zaaihoek Dam Reservoir
- Total capacity: 185 000 000 m^{3}
- Catchment area: 620 km^{2}
- Surface area: 1 244.6 ha

Zaaihoek Dam is a gravity type dam located on the Slang River in Kwazulu-Natal Province of South Africa. The dam, which has a 185,000,000 m3 capacity, was built in 1988. The dam primarily provides water for industrial and municipal uses. Its hazard potential has been ranked high (3). It is 39.45 km(24.5 mi) long. It is somewhat known for fishing.

== See also ==
- List of reservoirs and dams in South Africa
