= Little Brak River (river) =

River in the Western Cape, South Africa

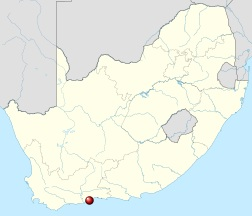

- Location within South Africa
- Native name: Klein-Brakrivier (Afrikaans)

Location
- Country: South Africa
- Province: Western Cape

Physical characteristics
- Source: _
- Mouth: Indian Ocean
  - location: Western Cape, South Africa
  - coordinates: 34°05′31″S 22°08′55″E
  - elevation: 0 m (0 ft)

Little Brak River or Klein Brak River (Afrikaans: Klein-Brakrivier) is a river in the Western Cape province of South Africa. Its tributaries include the Brandwag River and Moordkuil River. It falls within the Breede-Gouritz Water Management Area.

== See also ==
- List of rivers of South Africa
- List of drainage basins of South Africa
- Water Management Areas
