= Dwyka River =

The Dwyka River is located in the Karoo region, in South Africa. It flows from the North-west, joining the Gamka River as a tributary at the Gamka Dam.

In the 1870s, the Cape Colony government expanded its railway network inland, towards the diamond fields of Kimberley. A station, also named Dwyka, was built where the line crossed the Dwyka river.

The river's name was subsequently also adopted by geologists to define the Karoo Ice Age some 300 million years ago. Key sites in South Africa show evidence of glaciation, including Nooitgedacht near Kimberley. In South Africa, near the South Pole at that time as a result of plate tectonics, large ice sheets or glaciers covered high-lying areas. Geologists term this upland the Cargonian Highlands, stretching from what is now the Northern Cape through Gauteng to Mpumalanga.

== See also ==
- Dwyka Group
- Nooitgedacht Glacial Pavements
- Plate tectonics
- Alexander du Toit
