= Leeu-Gamka Dam =

- Interactive map of Leeu-Gamka Dam
- Official name: Leeu-Gamka Dam
- Location: Western Cape, South Africa
- Coordinates: 32°36′7″S 22°0′9″E
- Opening date: 1959
- Operators: Department of Water Affairs and Forestry

Dam and spillways
- Type of dam: earth-fill
- Impounds: Leeuw River
- Height: 15 m
- Length: 1 200 m

Reservoir
- Creates: Leeu-Gamka Dam Reservoir
- Total capacity: 13 600 000 m³
- Surface area: 425.8 ha

Leeu-Gamka Dam is an earth-fill type dam located on the Leeuw River, near Beaufort West, Western Cape, South Africa. It was established in 1959 and it serves mainly for irrigation purposes. The hazard potential of the dam has been ranked high (3).

== History ==
The first dam of this name was built in 1928. It was an earth-fill dam built by the irrigation board for £60,000 standing 13m high and 460m long. In 1928 it was restored after the dam was breached and damaged in a flood. Silting eventually reduced the dam's capacity. In 1959, the new dam was built 3km upstream from the old dam.

== See also ==
- List of reservoirs and dams in South Africa
- List of rivers of South Africa
