= Groot River (Southern Cape) =

River in the Western Cape, South Africa

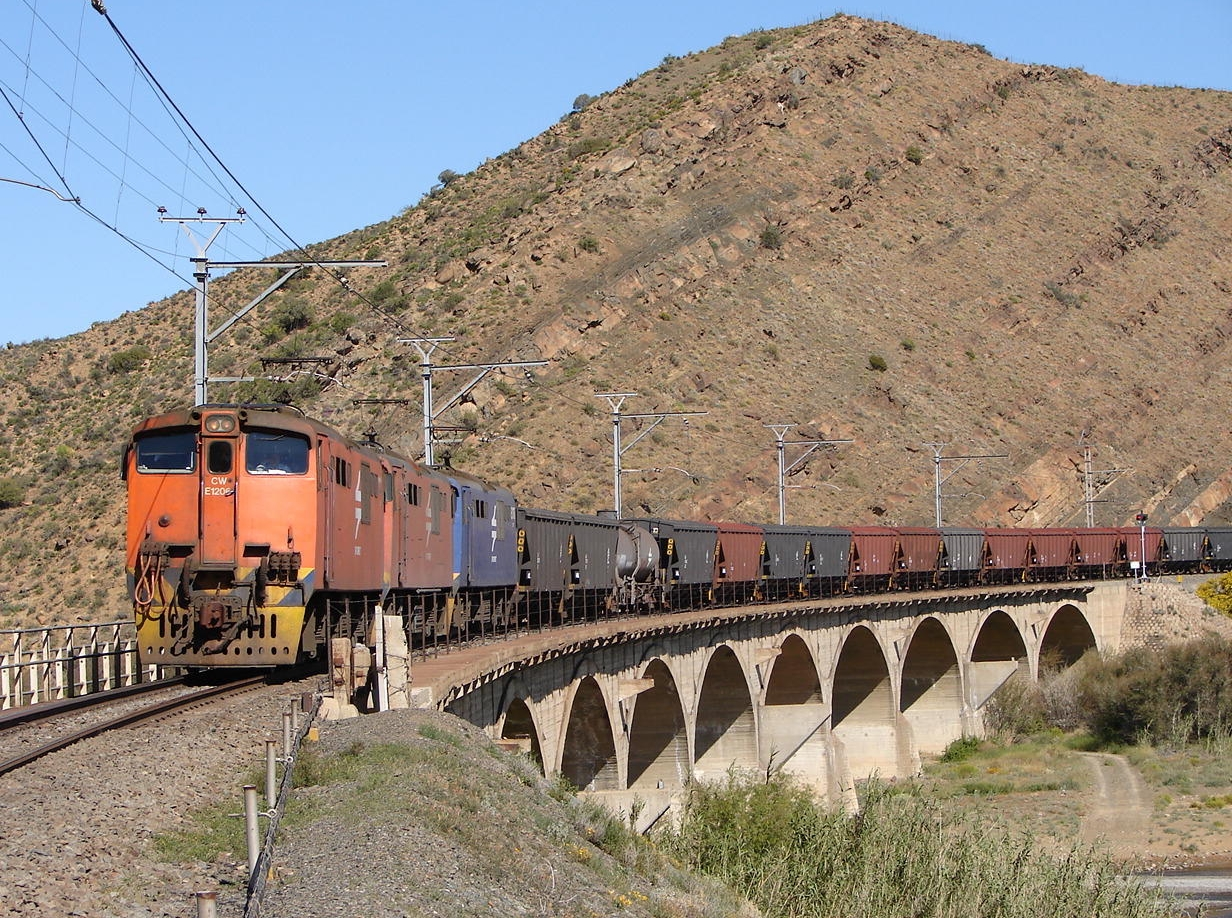
- Train approaching Laingsburg crossing the bridge over the Buffels River, the upper section of the Groot River

- Location of the Groot River mouth
- Etymology: From Grootrivier, meaning "big river" in the Afrikaans language

Location
- Country: South Africa
- State: Western Cape

Physical characteristics
- Source: Komsberg
  - location: Great Karoo, Northern Cape
  - coordinates: 32°46′S 20°39′E
  - elevation: 1,200 m (3,900 ft)
- Mouth: Gourits River
  - location: Western Cape
  - coordinates: 33°53′18″S 21°39′22″E
  - elevation: 82 m (269 ft)

The Groot River is a river in the southern area of the Western Cape province of South Africa. It is a right hand tributary of the Gourits River.

== Course ==
The Groot River rises in the Komsberg Escarpment of the Great Karoo, about 40 km south of Sutherland in the Northern Cape Province, and is known as the Komsberg in its upper course. Flowing southeastwards it becomes the Buffels River. It then bends southwards through Laingsburg and flows first southeast, then south into the Floriskraal Dam, and then southwest, before it flows southwards again and cuts across the Klein Swartberg Mountains through the Buffelspoort, a deep gorge, into the Little Karoo.

The river eventually becomes the Groot River at the point where the Buffels and the Klein-Swartberg River meet, about 50 km before its confluence with the Touws River, and then it flows eastwards, past Van Wyksdorp, towards its confluence with the Gourits River.

Its main tributary is the Touws River that rises in the Hex River Mountains, and flows eastwards through the town of the same name and south into the Little Karoo, where it joins the Groot River's right bank.

== Dams in the Groot River basin ==
- Floriskraal Dam (capacity 50,300,000 cubic metres (1.78×10^{9} cu ft)),
- Bellair Dam (capacity 10,100,000 cubic metres (360,000,000 cu ft)),
- Miertjieskraal Dam

== See also ==
- Grootrivier Pass
- List of rivers of South Africa
