= Gamkapoort Dam =

- Interactive map of Gamkapoort Dam
- Official name: Gamkapoort Dam
- Location: Western Cape, South Africa
- Coordinates: 33°18′1″S 21°38′36″E
- Opening date: 1969
- Operators: Department of Water Affairs and Forestry

Dam and spillways
- Type of dam: gravity
- Impounds: Gamka River
- Height: 39 m
- Length: 213 m

Reservoir
- Creates: Gamkapoort Dam Reservoir
- Total capacity: 54 000 m^{3}
- Catchment area: 17 055 km^{2}
- Surface area: 620 ha

Gamkapoort Dam is a gravity type dam located on the Gamka River, near Prince Albert, Western Cape, South Africa. It was established in 1969 and its primary purpose is for flood control.

== See also ==
- List of reservoirs and dams in South Africa
- List of rivers of South Africa
