= Slang River =

- Location within South Africa

Location
- Country: South Africa
- Region: Wakkerstroom, Mpumalanga

Physical characteristics
- Mouth
  - coordinates: 27°26′1″S 30°4′30″E

Slang River is a river in Mpumalanga, South Africa, near the towns of Volksrust and Wakkerstroom. The Zaaihoek Dam lies on the river.

== See also ==
- List of rivers of South Africa
