= Mvoti River =

Mvovti River (South Africa)

The Mvoti River or uMvoti River is a river in the KwaZulu-Natal region of South Africa. In the vicinity of KwaDukuza, the Mvoti River, is subject to extensive water abstraction, which supplies water for irrigation, industrial use, urban consumption, and domestic use in informal settlements.

The Mvoti estuary (29°24′S 32°20′E) is situated north of the coastal city of Durban. The river is approximately 197 km long and has a catchment area of 2829 km^{2}.

The river is named after Headman Mvoti Ncashange, of the L'la clan (the people of rest), who settled on the banks of this river.
