= Floriskraal Dam =

- Interactive map of Floriskraal Dam
- Official name: Floriskraal Dam
- Location: Western Cape, South Africa
- Coordinates: 33°17′30″S 20°59′6″E
- Opening date: 1957
- Operators: Department of Water Affairs and Forestry

Dam and spillways
- Type of dam: gravity/buttress
- Impounds: Buffels River (Groot River)
- Height: 27 m
- Length: 192 m

Reservoir
- Creates: Floriskraal Dam Reservoir
- Total capacity: 50 334 000 m³
- Surface area: 744.7 ha

Floriskraal Dam is a combined gravity and buttress type dam located on the Buffels River, near Laingsburg, Western Cape, South Africa. It was established in 1957. The primary purpose of the dam is to serve for irrigation. Its hazard potential has been ranked high (3).

== See also ==
- List of reservoirs and dams in South Africa
- List of rivers of South Africa
