= Touws River (town) =

Touws River Touwsrivier
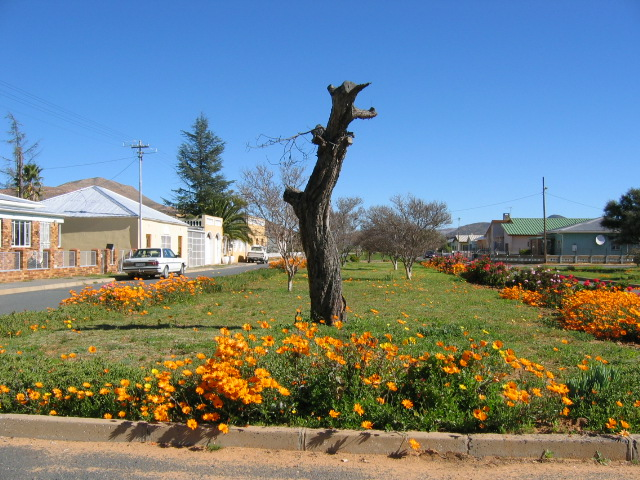
- Street in Touws River

- Location within Western Cape Location within South Africa
- Coordinates: 33°20′16″S 20°02′01″E
- Country: South Africa
- Province: Western Cape
- District: Cape Winelands
- Municipality: Breede Valley
- Established: 1877

Area
  - Total: 21.62 km^{2} (8.35 sq mi)
- Elevation: 770 m (2,530 ft)

Population (2011)
  - Total: 8,126
  - Density: 375.9/km^{2} (973.5/sq mi)

Racial makeup (2011)
  - Black African: 7.5%
  - Coloured: 84.9%
  - Indian/Asian: 0.3%
  - White: 6.6%
  - Other: 0.7%

First languages (2011)
  - Afrikaans: 93.1%
  - English: 2.6%
  - Xhosa: 1.0%
  - Other: 3.3%
- Time zone: UTC+2 (SAST)
- Postal code (street): 6880
- PO box: 6880
- Area code: 023

Touws River (Afrikaans: Touwsrivier) is a small railway town of 8,126 people in the Western Cape province of South Africa. It is located on the river of the same name, about 160 kilometres (100 mi) north-east of Cape Town. The Touwsrivier CPV Solar Project is located just outside of the town and supplies 50 MW to the national electrical grid.

== History ==
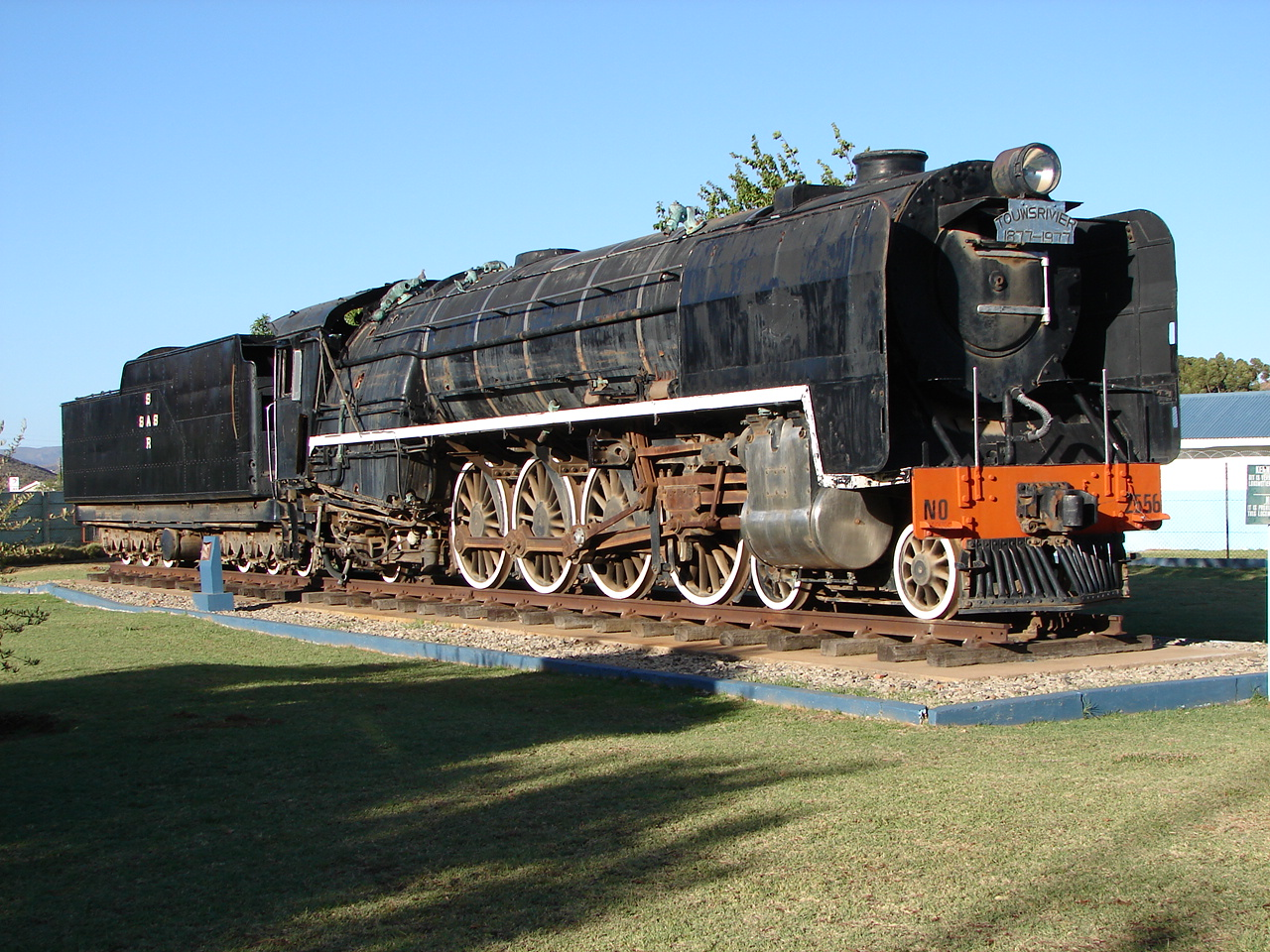
SAR Class 23 locomotive plinthed in a park in Touws River

The town of Touws River owes its existence to the Cape Government Railways, and to the route that their founder, Cape Prime Minister John Molteno, chose for a railway line over the Hex River Mountains.

A railway was needed from the port at Cape Town, to service the newly discovered diamond fields in Kimberley. However, several seemingly impregnable ranges of mountains separated Cape Town from the hinterland of the Cape. The Royal Commonwealth Society (1898) records how the route was chosen:

When Mr. Molteno formulated his railway scheme he sent for his consulting engineer, who asked him what was the route he desired. Mr. Molteno asked for a map of South Africa, which was brought to him. Taking a ruler he drew his pen along it, in a direct line from Cape Town to Beaufort West. "But," said the engineer, "that means you go slap bang through the Hex River Mountains." "Never mind," said Mr. Molteno, "that is the way I want it to go." And that is the way it did go.

In 1875, the engineers of the Cape Government Railways arrived to survey the region and found that, at the exact spot indicated, there was indeed a viable route through the formidable Hex River Mountains, starting from Worcester and descending on the other side, to a spot where the town of Touws River now stands. On 7 November 1877, the Worcester–Matjiesfontein section of the Cape Government Railways' Cape Town–Kimberley main line was opened to traffic. The line included a station, originally named "Montagu Road", where the line bridged the Touws River. The name was given in reference to the town of Montagu, which lies about 90 kilometres (56 mi) to the south by road. In 1883 the station was renamed "Touwsrivier".

The name "Touws" originates from a Khoi word for ash, which also referred to the local "Ash-bushes" (Salsola aphylla). It is uncertain whether the name originally referred to the bushes, to the colour of the soil, or to the colour of the river (historically, the Touws river was occasionally known as the "Ash river").

The town of Touws River developed around this railway depot, at which locomotives were changed after the climb over the Hex River Pass. It was particularly busy because of the need to bank trains over the pass; banking locomotives were turned at Touws River to return to De Doorns. From 1924 it also served as the junction for the branch line to Ladismith. The closing of the Ladismith branch in 1981 and the opening of the Hex River Tunnel in 1989 reduced the importance of Touws River as a depot.

Now a sleepy town, surrounded by farms, mountains and game reserves, it preserves open-air displays of steam engines in memory of its history as a railway centre.

A notable resident of the town is Margaret Maritz (born 27 September 1906) who, as of 2022, aged 116, was regarded as one of the oldest people in South Africa.

== Governance ==
Touws River received municipal government in 1962; with the transformation of local government in South Africa it has been incorporated into the Breede Valley Local Municipality. It is located in ward 1 of the local municipality, which in turn falls within the Cape Winelands District Municipality.

== Geography ==
Touws River is located at an elevation of 770 metres (2,530 ft) on the southwestern edge of the Great Karoo, east of the Hex River Mountains and north of the Langeberg, at the point where the Donkeys River flows into the Touws River. It lies just to the south of the N1 highway, 180 kilometres (110 mi) by road from Cape Town. The railway line passes through the town, with the yards and depot being located just to the north-east; by rail it is 257 kilometres (160 mi) from Cape Town.

== Demography ==
The 2001 Census recorded the population of Touws River as 6,781 people in an area of 6.4 square kilometres (2.5 sq mi), giving it a population density of 1,060 inhabitants per square kilometre (2,700/sq mi). Of the population, 87.7% described themselves as Coloured, 10.1% as White, 2.0% as Black African, and 0.2% as Indian or Asian. As a first language, 97.7% of the population spoke Afrikaans, 1.2% spoke English, and 0.9% spoke Xhosa. 38.6% of the population was under the age of 18.
