= Diep River =

River in the Western Cape, South Africa

Coordinates: 33.3667°S 18.8500°E

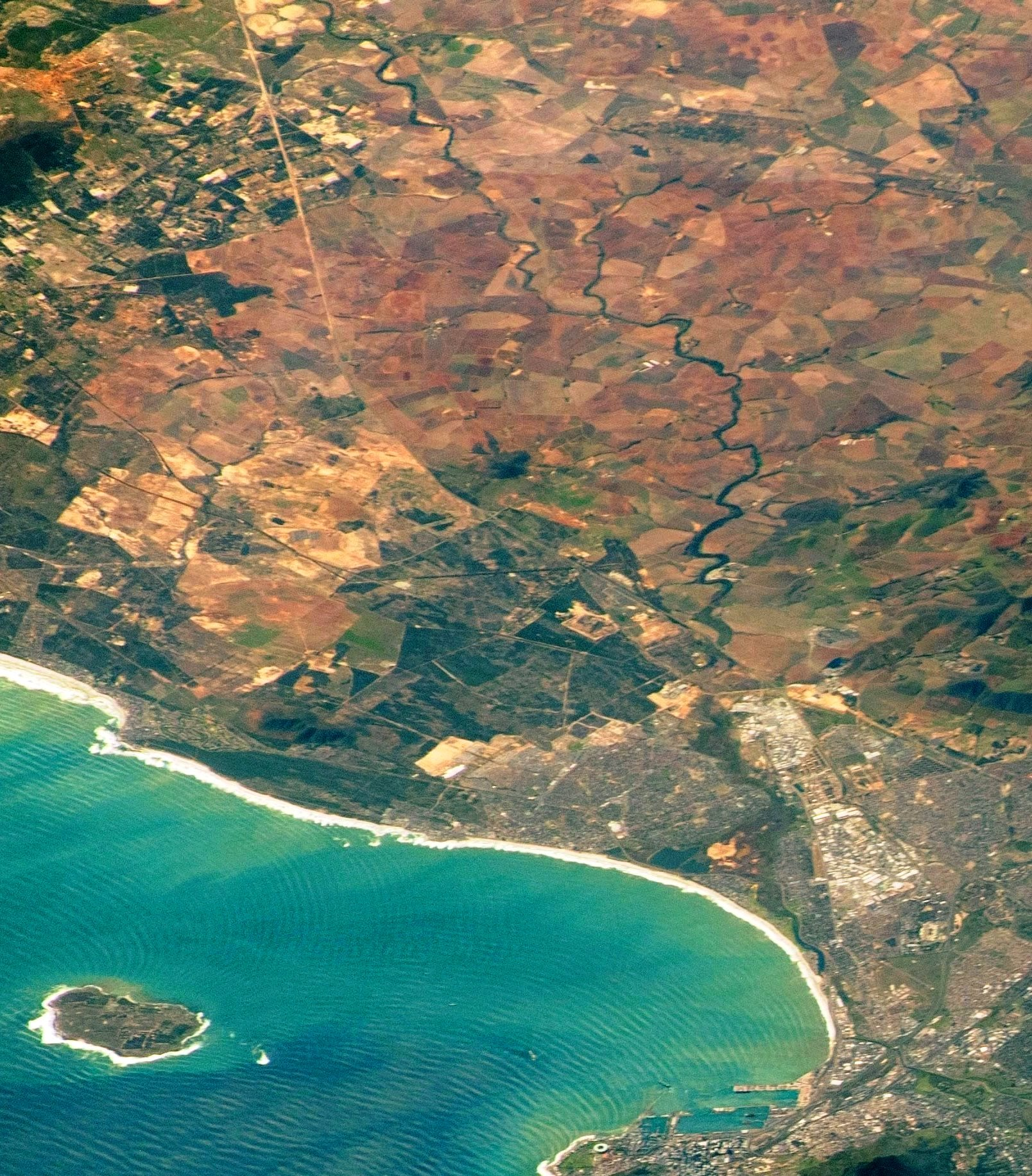
- Course of the Diep River seen weaving through wheat fields of the Swartland

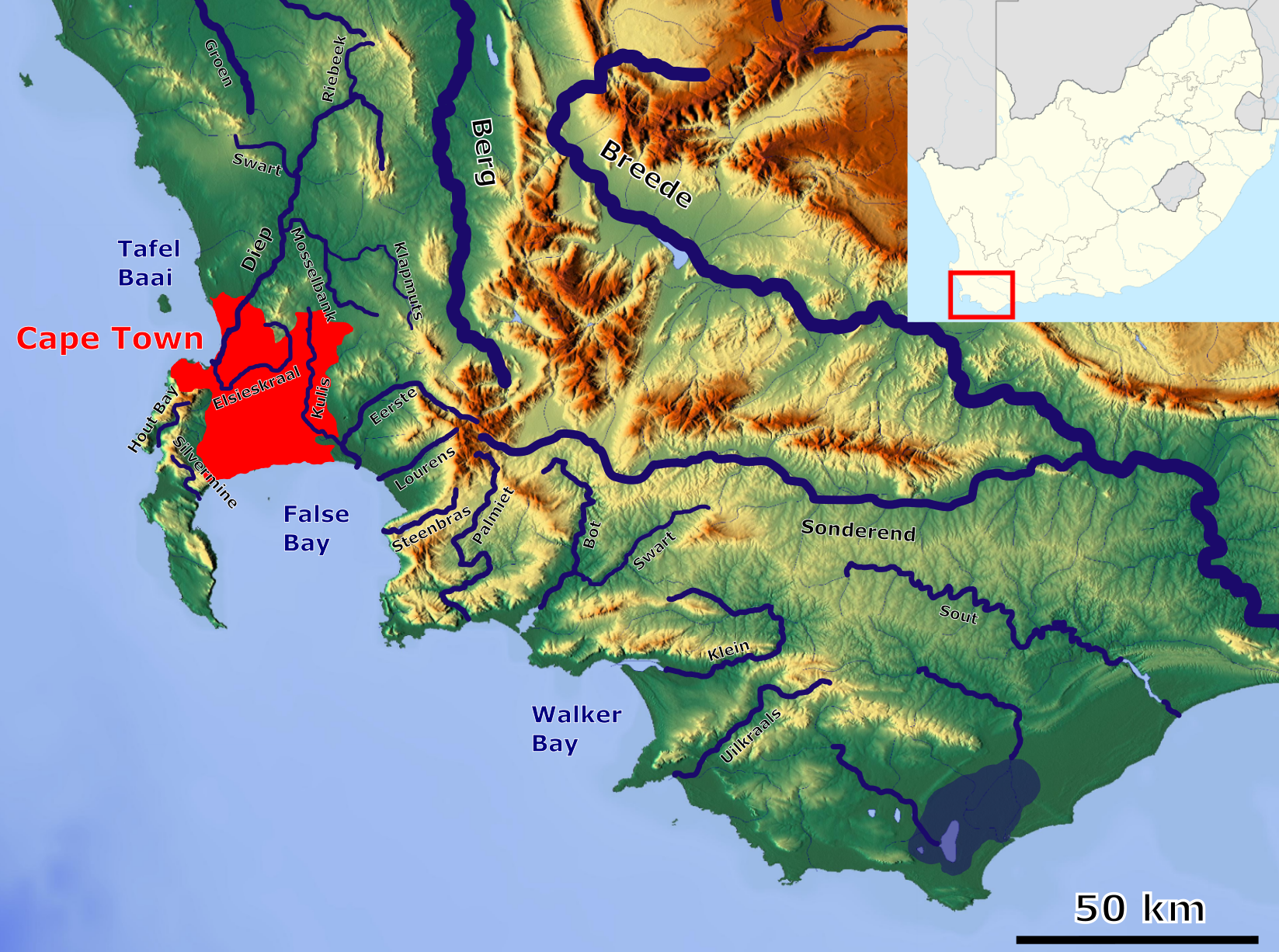
- The rivers of the Cape region with the Diep (left)
- Etymology: Afrikaans for deep

Location
- Country: South Africa
- Region: Western Cape Province

Diep River (Afrikaans Dieprivier), drains the area between the Kasteel Mountain (north of Malmesbury) and the northern slopes of the Durbanville Hills, in the Western Cape, a province of South Africa.
