= Gamka River =

River in South Africa

Gamka River Gamkarivier
- Location of the Olifants River mouth
- Etymology: From "lion" in the Khoisan language

Location
- Country: South Africa
- State: Western Cape Province

Physical characteristics
- Source: North of Beaufort West
  - coordinates: 32°11′S 22°35′E
  - elevation: 1,400 m (4,600 ft)
- Mouth: Gourits River
  - coordinates: 33°40′55″S 21°42′58″E
  - elevation: 516 m (1,693 ft)

Gamka River (Afrikaans: Gamkarivier) is a river located in the Western Cape, South Africa. The name 'gamka' means 'Lion' and was probably named so by the San people (Bushmen). The river originates north of Beaufort West, generally flowing southwest towards the Gamkapoort Dam.

The main tributaries of the Gamka River, are the Dwyka River, Koekemoers River and Leeuw River which rise in the Great Karoo, converge and flow southwards through the Swartberg Mountains. The Olifants River joins the Gamka River south of Calitzdorp. Together these become the Gourits River.

The Gamka River flows from the North East of the Gamka Dam and the Dwyka River from the North West. Both rivers flow into the Gamka Dam from there the Gamka river flows south and becomes the Gourits River at Calitzdorp, where it flows past the similarly named mountains Gamkaberg.

== Dams in the Gamka River ==
- Doornfontein Dam (capacity 4,400,000 cubic metres (160,000,000 cu ft)),
- Gamka Dam (capacity 1,800,000 cubic metres (64,000,000 cu ft)),
- Springfontein Dam,
- Leeu-Gamka Dam (capacity 14,300,000 cubic metres (500,000,000 cu ft)),
- Gamkapoort Dam (capacity 44,200,000 cubic metres (1.56×10^{9} cu ft)),
- Oukloof Dam (capacity 4,200,000 cubic metres (150,000,000 cu ft)),
- Calitzdorp Dam (capacity 4,800,000 cubic metres (170,000,000 cu ft)),
- Tierkloof Dam (capacity 50,000 cubic metres (1,800,000 cu ft))

== See also ==
- List of rivers of South Africa
- List of reservoirs and dams in South Africa
