= Lourens River Protected Natural Environment =

Area along the Lourens River in Helderberg, South Africa

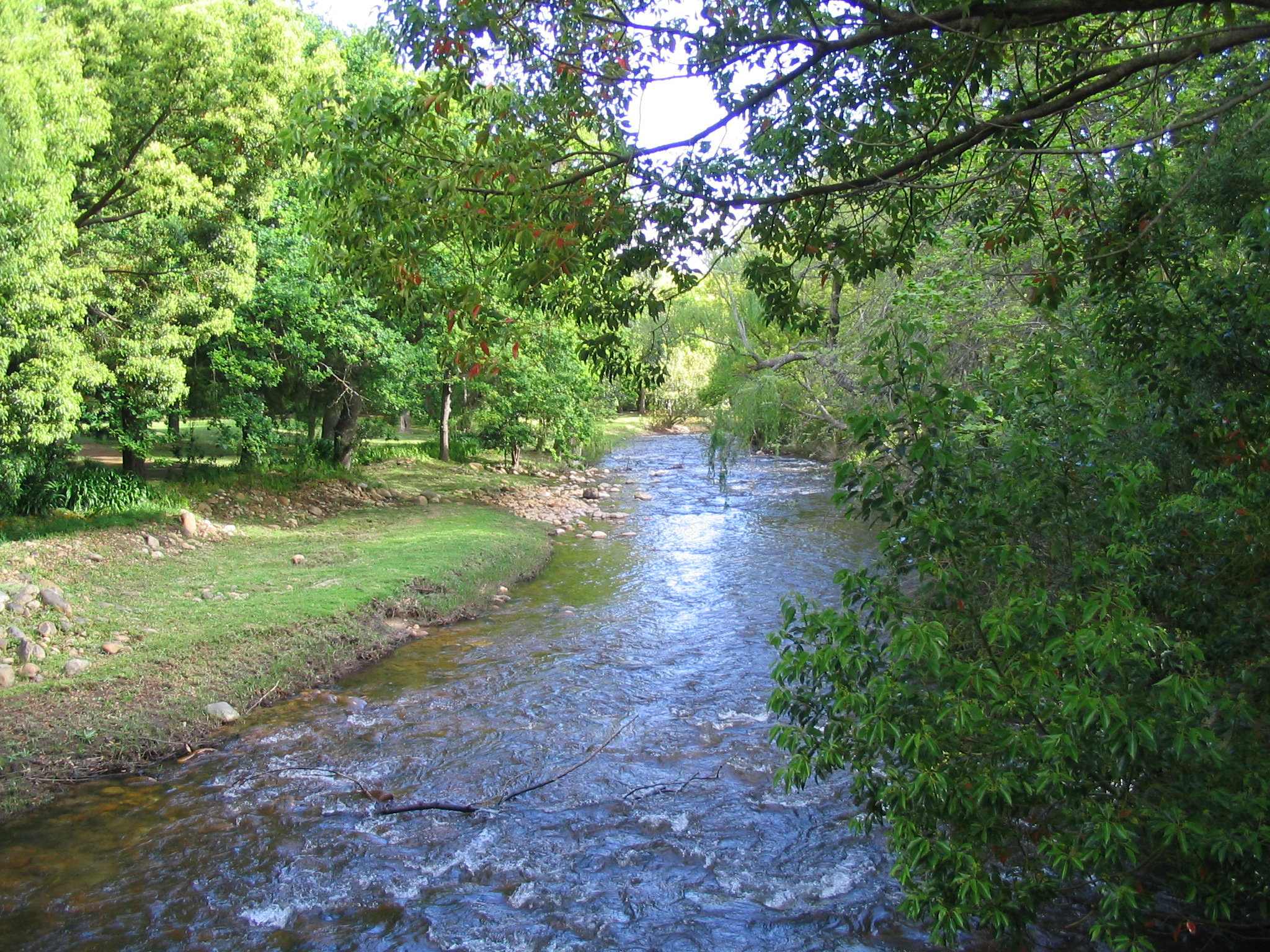

- Location within South Africa
- Location: Western Cape, South Africa
- Nearest city: Somerset West
- Coordinates: 34.078°S 18.885°E
- Area: 4,412.41 ha (10,903.3 acres)
- Established: 5 September 1997

Lourens River Protected Natural Environment is a section of protected land along the Lourens River in the Helderberg region, South Africa.

The Lourens River is about 23 kilometres (14 mi) long, flowing from the Hottentots Holland Mountains into False Bay at Strand. Its upper reaches are relatively undisturbed and are privately owned. However, the lower part of the river flows through developed areas as well as past fynbos and plantations of invasive alien trees. This natural area is threatened by pollution as well as by invasive alien weeds such as Kikuyu grass and the Black Wattle tree.

The Dick Dent Bird Sanctuary is contained within the protected area. Beside the protected area is the Vergelegen Nature Reserve. West of the protected environment is the Helderberg Nature Reserve.

== See also ==
- Biodiversity of Cape Town
- List of nature reserves in Cape Town
