= Dick Dent Bird Sanctuary =

Reserve in Somerset West, South Africa

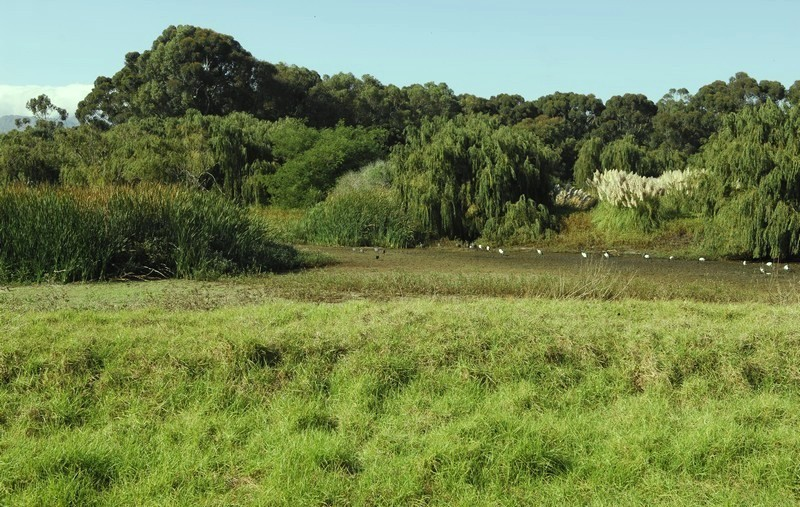
- Dick Dent Bird Sanctuary, Somerset West

- Location within Cape Town
- Location: Somerset West, South Africa
- Coordinates: 34°05′56″S 18°49′23″E
- Area: 10 ha (25 acres)

Dick Dent Bird Sanctuary is a 10 hectares (25 acres) reserve in Strand, South Africa.

This isolated bird sanctuary is located near the estuary of the Lourens River. It used to be the site of a waste water treatment works but is now protected within the Lourens River Protected Natural Environment. It is managed by the nearby Helderberg Nature Reserve with help from the Somerset West Bird Club, and it is now a habitat for a great many water birds.

== See also ==
- Biodiversity of Cape Town
- List of nature reserves in Cape Town
- Cape Lowland Freshwater Wetland
