= Helderberg (disambiguation) =

The name Helderberg, meaning bright or clear mountain in Afrikaans and Dutch, may refer to:

- The Helderberg wine-producing region in the Western Cape, South Africa
- The Helderberg (House of Assembly of South Africa constituency)
- The Helderberg Mountain for which the above region is named
- The Boeing 747 named Helderberg on Flight SA 295 that crashed near Mauritius in 1987
- The container ship SA Helderberg
- The Helderberg Escarpment, at the northern end of the Catskill Mountains near Albany, New York, USA
- The Helderberg Formation, a geologic formation in Pennsylvania, Maryland and West Virginia, US
- The Helderberg Mountains, a mountain range in New York

== See also ==
- Heldeberg
