= Faure, South Africa =

Suburb of the City of Cape Town, Western Cape, South Africa

Faure
- Location within Western Cape Location within South Africa
- Coordinates: 34.031°S 18.753°E
- Country: South Africa
- Province: Western Cape
- Municipality: City of Cape Town
- Time zone: UTC+2 (SAST)
- PO box: 7131

Faure is a hamlet some 16 km south-west of Stellenbosch and 13 km north-west of Strand, next to the suburb of Croydon. Administratively it is a suburb of the City of Cape Town, and is in the Helderberg region. Nearby is the kramat or tomb of Sheik Yusuf (1626-1699), an Islamic expatriate priest.

Faure is a common surname; it is uncertain after whom this place was named. It may have been named after Pieter Faure, the name of South Africa's first trawler which arrived in Table Bay in 1897.

== See also ==
- Faure level crossing accident
