= Helderberg =

Region of the City of Cape Town, South Africa

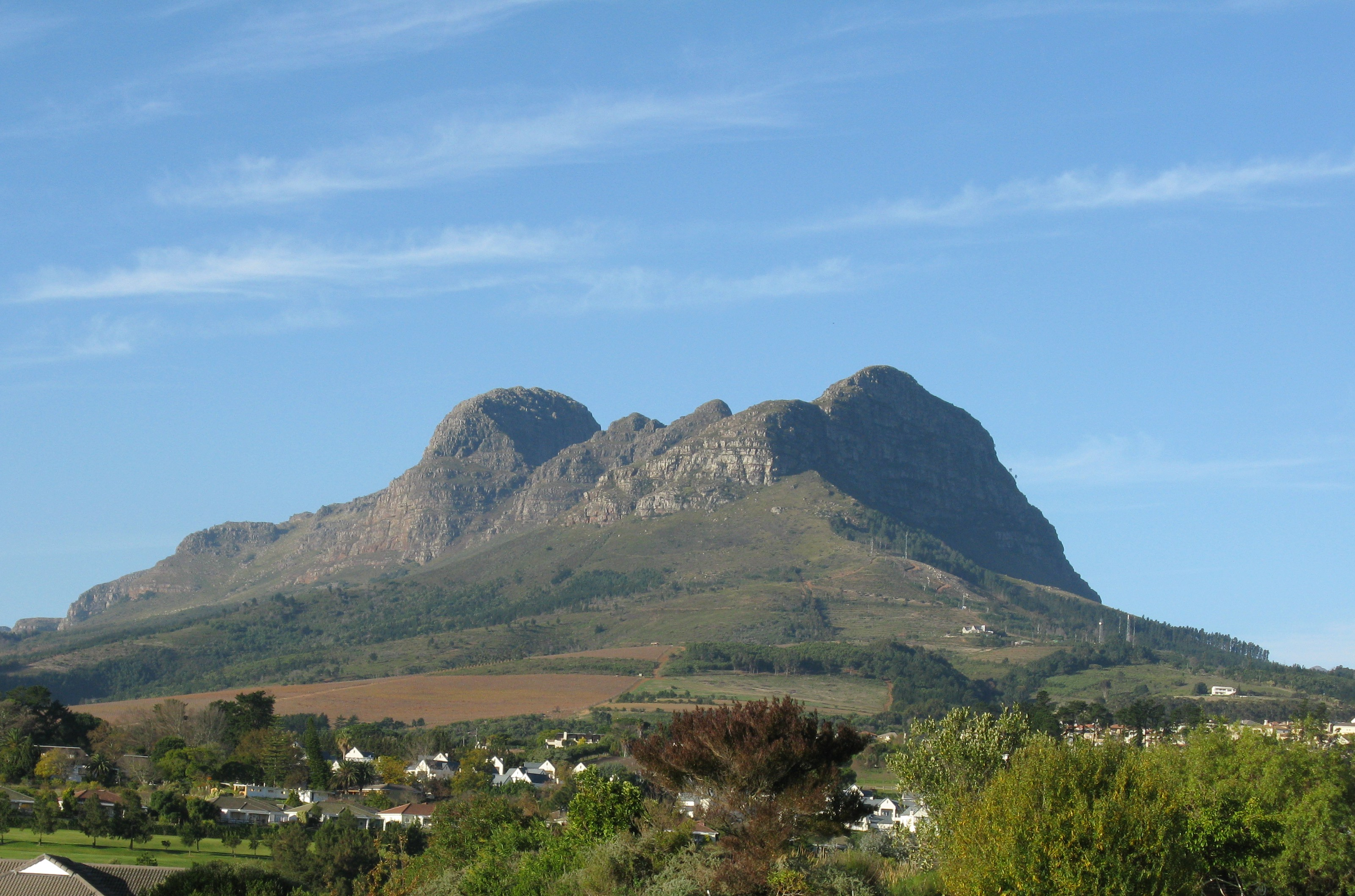
- Helderberg Mountain seen more or less from the west

- Location within Western Cape Location within South Africa
- Coordinates: 34°5′00″S 18°55′00″E
- Country: South Africa
- Province: Western Cape
- Municipality: City of Cape Town

Area
  - Total: 334.41 km^{2} (129.12 sq mi)

Population (2011)
  - Total: 395,812
  - Density: 1,183.6/km^{2} (3,065.5/sq mi)
- Time zone: UTC+2 (SAST)
- Area code: 021

Helderberg refers to a planning district of the City of Cape Town metropolitan municipality, the mountain after which it is named, a wine-producing area in the Western Cape province of South Africa, or a small census area in Somerset West, depending on the context.

Originally known as the Hottentots-Holland area, it was renamed Helderberg by the City of Cape Town, following concerns about possible racist connotations in the name (see Hottentot).

The Helderberg consists of Somerset West, Strand, Gordons Bay, Macassar and a few other towns. The district takes its name from the mountain of the same name, which is Afrikaans for "clear mountain", referring to the way in which the western side of the mountain is illuminated in the evenings, and which culminates at a height of 1,137m at The Dome.

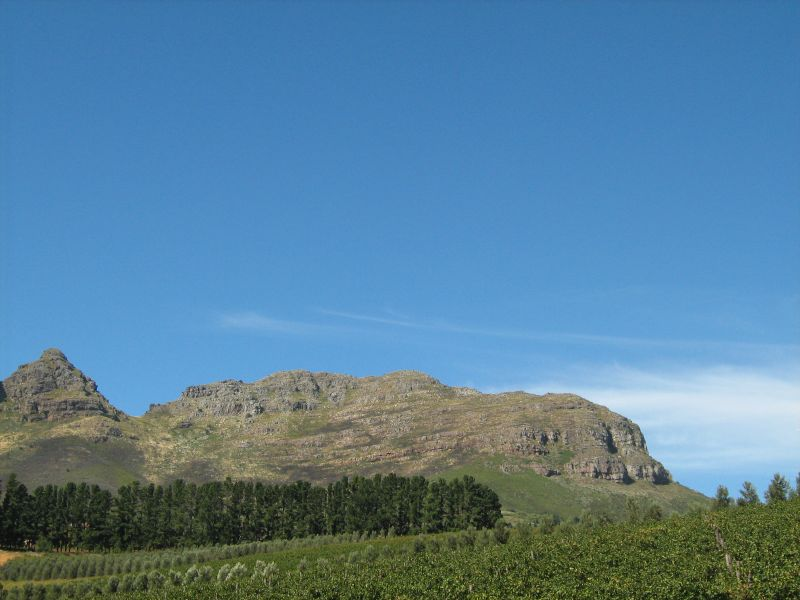
View of Helderberg

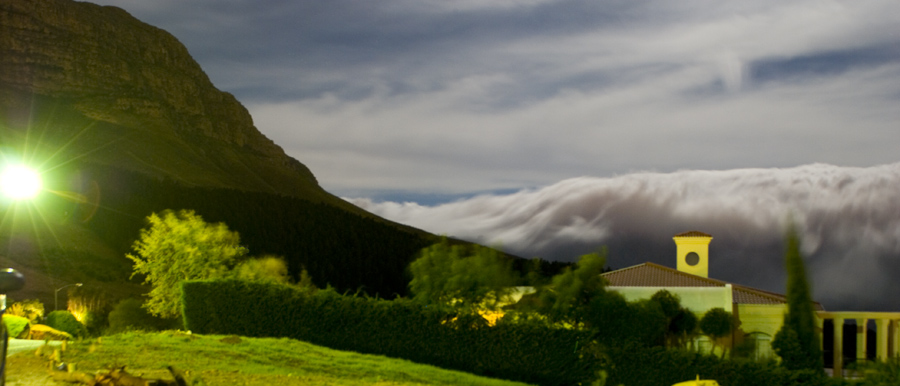
Helderberg at night

== Physical geography ==
The Helderberg planning district of the City of Cape Town includes the suburbs of Macassar, Somerset West, Strand, Gordon's Bay, Sir Lowry's Pass, Stellenbosch Farms, and the Steenbras River valley.

It is situated in the southeastern part of the metro, below the Winelands region.

=== Mountains and hills ===
==== Helderberg ====
The Helderberg Mountain is a mountain of the Cape Fold Belt, east of the main range of the Hottentots Holland Mountains, and south of the Stellenbosch Mountains. The upper parts are Table Mountain Sandstone, on a base of Tygerberg formation rocks and part of the Stellenbosch granite pluton.

Peaks:

- Helderberg Dome: 1,137 m
- West Peak: 1,001 m
- Central Peak:
- Driekop: 971 m

==== Hottentots Holland Mountains ====
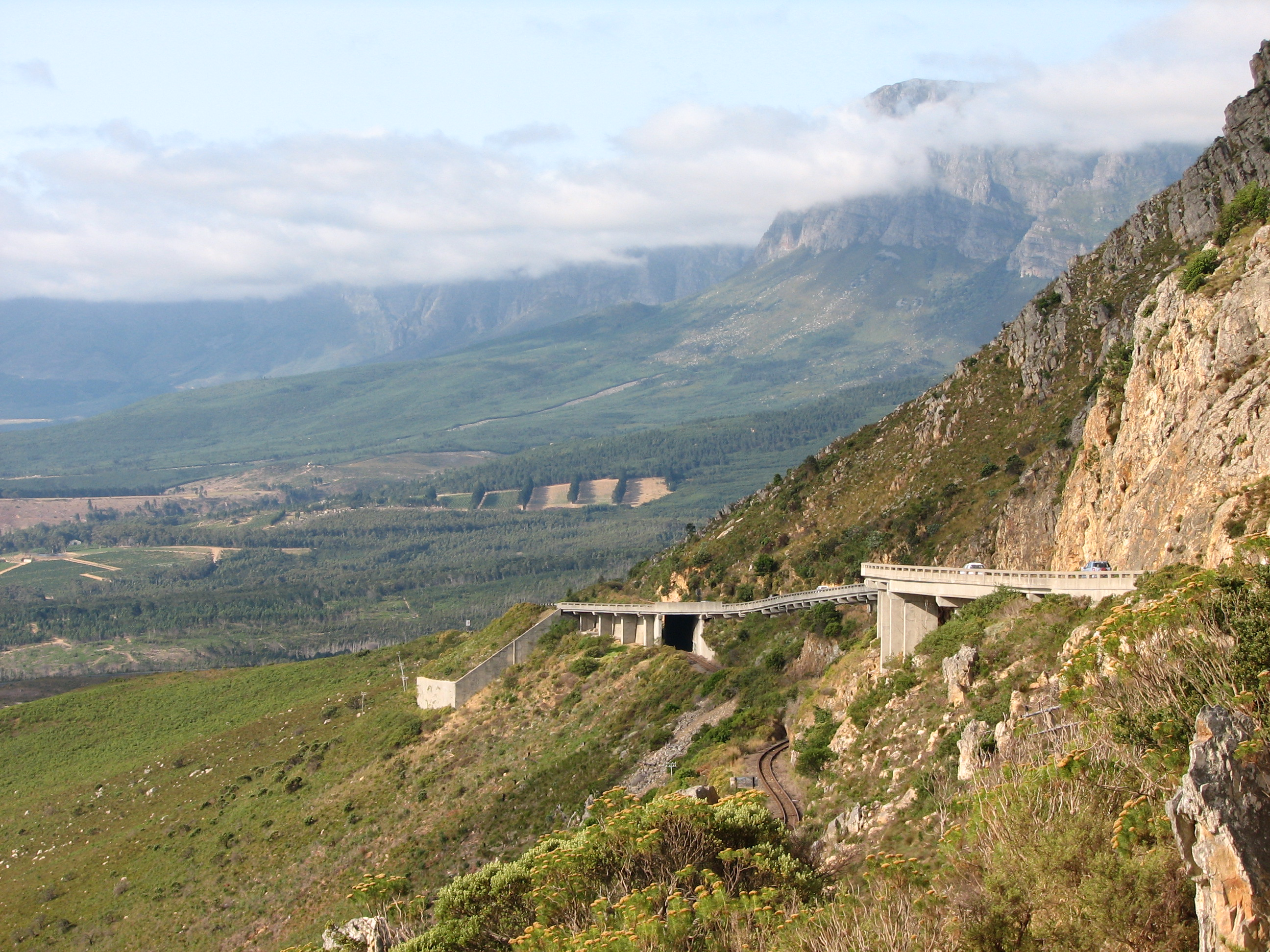
Hottentots Holland Mountains and Sir Lowry's Pass

The Hottentots Holland Mountains are part of the Cape Fold Belt. The range forms a barrier between the Cape Town metropolitan area and the southern Overberg coast. The range is primarily composed of Table Mountain Sandstone, and forms a large range between the Cape Town outlying suburbs of Somerset West and Gordon's Bay to the west, and the large Elgin valley to the east.

Sir Lowry's Pass is the only crossing, in the form of the N2 motorway, which is the primary route out of the Cape Town area for travellers heading east along the coast of South Africa.

Peaks:

- Haelkop: 1,384 m
- Somerset-Sneeukop: 1,590 m
- Landrosnaald 1,346 m
- Pisgah 1,349 m
- Sneeukopnaald 1,285 m
- Landroskop 1,435 m

==== Schapenberg ====
Schapenberg is a foothill of the Hottentots Holland Mountains that separates the catchments of the Lourens River and the Sir Lowry’s River. The rocks are of the Tygerberg formation with granite of the Stellembosch pluton.

=== Drainage ===
Rivers:

- Eerste River: Most of the catchment of the Eerste river is outside the Helderberg region in the Stellenbosch district
  - Kuils River
- Lourens River: The catchment of the Lourens River is in the Helderberg region. It is the largest river of the region. The source is in the Diepgat Ravine, in the Hottentots Holland Mountains. It is joined by minor tributaries from Landdroskloof and Sneeukopkloof in its upper reaches, The river flows in a south-westerly direction between the Helderberg and Schapenberg through Somerset West and Strand to a small estuary on the coast of False Bay. Its overall length is about 20 kilometres.
- Soete River
- Sir Lowry's River:

Paardevlei

=== Flora and fauna ===
There are several conservation areas in the Helderberg region:

Dick Dent Bird Sanctuary is an isolated 10-hectare (25-acre) bird sanctuary in the Lourens River Protected Natural Environment near the estuary of the Lourens River in Strand.

Harmony Flats Nature Reserve is a 9-hectare (22-acre) enclave of protected land between Strand and Gordon's Bay, which protects a surviving fragment of critically endangered Lourensford Alluvium Fynbos vegetation. Harmony Flats was originally established to preserve a habitat for the rare and declining geometric tortoise (Psammobates geometricus), which is now locally extinct, but the reserve still protects about 220 species of plants, many of them endangered, as well as a range of animal species, such as the tiny parrot-beaked tortoise (Homopus areolatus), various snakes and a large variety of birds.

Helderberg Nature Reserve is a nature reserve in Somerset West. on the southern slopes of the Helderberg mountain. Its 398 ha consist mostly of Kogelberg Sandstone Fynbos (a highly species-rich vegetation type) with smaller patches of Boland Granite Fynbos and Southern Afrotemperate Forest. Altogether about 600 species of plant have been recorded here, including a wide range of proteas. Particularly prominent plants include the pincushion proteas (Leucospermum sp.), cone bushes (Leucadendron sp.), sugar bushes (Protea sp.), heaths (Erica sp.) and the waboom tree (Protea nitida). Animals that can be found there include the Cape leopard, caracal, grey duiker, Cape grysbok, steenbok, mongoose, angulate and padloper tortoises and over 170 species of bird.

Part of the Hottentots Holland Nature Reserve lies within the boundaries of the City of Cape Town above Somerset West.

Kogelberg Nature Reserve is a nature reserve of 3,000 hectares (12 sq mi) in the Kogelberg Mountain Range, to the east and south of Gordon's Bay. It protects a large portion of Kogelberg Sandstone Fynbos and about 1600 plant species, giving it a floral diversity per unit area that is greater than anywhere else in the world. Part of it is in the Helderberg region.

Lourens River Protected Natural Environment is a section of protected land along the Lourens River. Its upper reaches are relatively undisturbed and are privately owned. However, the lower part of the river flows through developed areas as well as past fynbos and plantations of invasive alien trees. This natural area is threatened by pollution and by invasive alien weeds. The Dick Dent Bird Sanctuary is contained within the protected area. Beside the protected area is the Vergelegen Nature Reserve.

Macassar Dunes Conservation Area is a 1,116-hectare (4.31 sq mi) coastal nature reserve in Macassar, which protects the unique local Cape Flats Dune Strandveld vegetation with its dense evergreen thickets, flowers, shrubs and trees. The last remaining forest of the endangered White Milkwood tree (Sideroxylon inerme) on the Cape Flats is found on this reserve. 178 plant species are recorded from the area. Animal species found here include small antelope, tortoises, porcupine, hares, mongoose and a variety of birds.

Silwerboomkloof Natural Heritage Site is a small, protected valley (“kloof”), near the Helderberg Nature Reserve, conserving an isolated forest of the rare Silvertree (Leucadendron argenteum), a striking, silver-coloured tree of the Protea family, which is actually indigenous to the eastern slopes of Table Mountain, making the population at Silwerboomkloof an isolated anomaly. This 4.9-hectare (12-acre) reserve encloses a section of Boland Granite Fynbos and Renosterveld and a total of around 220 species of plant have been recorded.

The Helderberg Marine Protected Area is a small marine conservation area on the north-eastern side of False Bay, the mouths of the Lourens River in the Strand, and the Eerste River in Macassar. The MPA is in the warm temperate Agulhas bioregion. The shoreline is sandy beach with mobile dunes, and the seabed is low sandstone reef with kelp beds and sand sediments. The areas nearest to the river mouths are in relatively poor condition due to pollution of the river water. The beach inside the MPA is the most pristine part of the north shore of False Bay.

== Communities and the built environment ==
- Croydon
- Eerste River
- Faure
- Firgrove, a sub-place of Somerset West for census purposes.
- Gordon's Bay (Afrikaans: Gordonsbaai) is a harbour town in the Helderberg region, on the shores of Gordon's Bay in the northeastern corner of False Bay about 58 km from the Cape Town city centre, to the south of the N2 national road and is named after Robert Jacob Gordon (1743–1795), the Dutch explorer of Scottish descent. It is the smallest of three towns in the Helderberg region that was previously a municipality in its own right. Gordon's Bay consists of the old village, situated around the old harbour and Bikini Beach, the mountainside on the lower slopes of the Hottentots-Holland mountains overlooking False Bay, and the low-lying suburbs close to the main beach, making up the most recent expansion of the town. It is mostly a residential area, with a small area of light industry. It is a subdivision of the Helderberg municipal planning district.
- Macassar, a subdivision of the Helderberg municipal planning district.
- Sir Lowry's Pass Village, a small mostly residential town near the base of Sir Lowry's Pass, about 60 km from Cape Town city centre. It is a subdivision of the Helderberg municipal planning district.
- Somerset West (Afrikaans: Somerset-Wes), the largest Helderberg community by area. Previously a municipality in its own right, Somerset West is mostly residential and commercial in nature. It is situated in the bowl to the south of the Helderberg mountains, on both sides of the Lourens River, and mostly north of the N2. The vehicle registration code for Somerset West is CFM, and the area uses the postal code 7130, and PO Box code 7129.
  - Suburbs of Somerset West
- Strand, (Afrikaans for 'beach') is a seaside resort town, situated on the north-eastern edge of False Bay south of the Helderberg mountain and the N2, between Somerset West and Gordon's Bay, and is about 50 km southeast of Cape Town City Bowl. Previously a municipality in its own right, it also referred to as The Strand (Afrikaans: Die Strand), which is the old name of the town. The vehicle registration code for Strand is CEY and the post code for street addresses is 7140. Originally, Strand was mostly a residential area, with a few large industries in outlying areas, but as it includes a large proportion of the flat ground in the Helderberg, it has become the most industrialised suburb of the area, particularly along the south side of the N2. It is a subdivision of the Helderberg municipal planning district.
  - Suburbs of Strand
- Stellenbosch Farms, the rural areas to the north of Somerset West, Strand, Gordon's Bay, and Sir Lowry's Pass village, is a subdivision of the Helderberg planning district.
- The Steenbras river valley is a rural subdivision of the Helderberg planning district.

== History ==
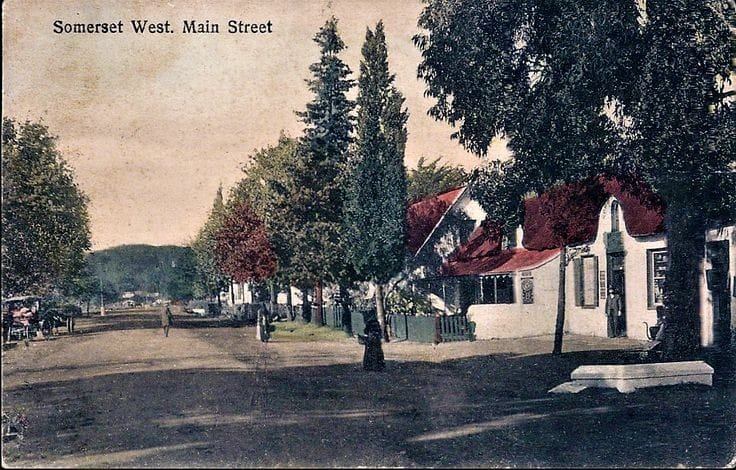
Main Road Somerset West in 1909.

Van Riebeeck’s outriders found a fertile valley with adequate water in what they named the Tweede Rivier, (now the Lourens River), inhabited by the Khoikhoi Chief Sousoa and his family. They called the valley Hottentot’s Holland and established a company outpost there.

In 1671, the Tweede Rivier was renamed the Breitenbach River, after Lieutenant Coenraad Breitenbach, but the name did not last long, as in 1673, after Laurens Visser, the commander of the outpost, reputedly drowned in the river, it was renamed the Laurens River in his memory, and over time the spelling changed to the Lourens River.

A town developed around the Lourens River and the farm of Vergelegen (Dutch: "remotely situated"), an 18th-century farmhouse built in the historic Cape Dutch style by Willem Adriaan van der Stel, governor of the Cape and son of Simon van der Stel, who gave his name to the nearby town of Stellenbosch. Willem Adriaan was later sent back to Holland after being charged with corruption and cruelty towards local Dutch farmers.

The farm is now owned by a subsidiary of the large mining company Anglo American, who have restored the farmhouse and continue to produce wines.

Somerset West was founded in 1822 on part of the historic farm, Vergelegen. The town was originally named Somerset after the British governor of the Cape Colony during the 1800s, Lord Charles Somerset, with the suffix 'West' being added after 1825 to differentiate it from Somerset East, a town in the Eastern Cape.

Strand was established as a holiday and fishing resort in 1714. Before being known as Strand, the settlement was known as Mostert's Bay. In 1970, during the Apartheid era, all black, coloured and Asian people were forcefully removed when the town was classified as a white-only resort. Included in the communities forced to leave at this time were the descendants of Cape Malay slaves, who had escaped from Cape Town over 100 years earlier. They lost their homes, but their mosque still stands.

Recent expansion and development of Somerset West, Strand and Gordon's Bay has resulted in them now being adjacent to each other.

The mountain crossing of the Hottentots Holland range was known by the indigenous Khoi people as the Gantouw or Eland's Pass, and was used as a stock route. The Dutch and British settlers at the Cape built a rough pass called the Hottentots Holland Kloof Pass following the Gantouw route. The first recorded crossing was in 1664, and by 1821 the pass was seeing 4500 ox-wagons per year crossing into the interior, but the route was so severe that more than 20% of them were damaged. The ruts left by these wagons being dragged over the mountains can still be seen, and were declared a National Monument in 1958.

Starting in 1828, a new pass was constructed on the current route that would allow ox wagons to navigate the pass without difficulty. Construction began at a site about 2 km to the south of the Hottentots Holland Kloof, by the engineer Charles Michell using convict labour. The new pass was opened on 6 July 1830, and named after Sir Lowry Cole, the Governor of the Cape Colony at the time.

== Economy ==
Local media in the region include the District Mail, a local newspaper, and Radio Helderberg.

== Census area ==
Helderberg is also the name of a census sub-place within Somerset West, a small residential area on both sides of Sir Lowry's Pass road on the east side of the town.
