= Silwerboomkloof Natural Heritage Site =

Protected valley near the Helderberg Nature Reserve, in Somerset West,

Silwerboomkloof Natural Heritage Site is a small, protected valley (“kloof”), near the Helderberg Nature Reserve, in Somerset West, South Africa.

The name Silwerboomkloof means “Valley of the Silvertrees”. The rare Silvertree (Leucadendron argenteum) is a striking, silver-coloured tree of the Protea family, and this reserve conserves a forest of them. The iconic Silvertree is actually indigenous to the eastern slopes of Table Mountain, making the population at Silwerboomkloof a bit of an isolated anomaly. This 4.9-hectare (12-acre) reserve encloses a section of “Granite Fynbos” and “Renosterveld” and a total of around 220 species of plant have been recorded.

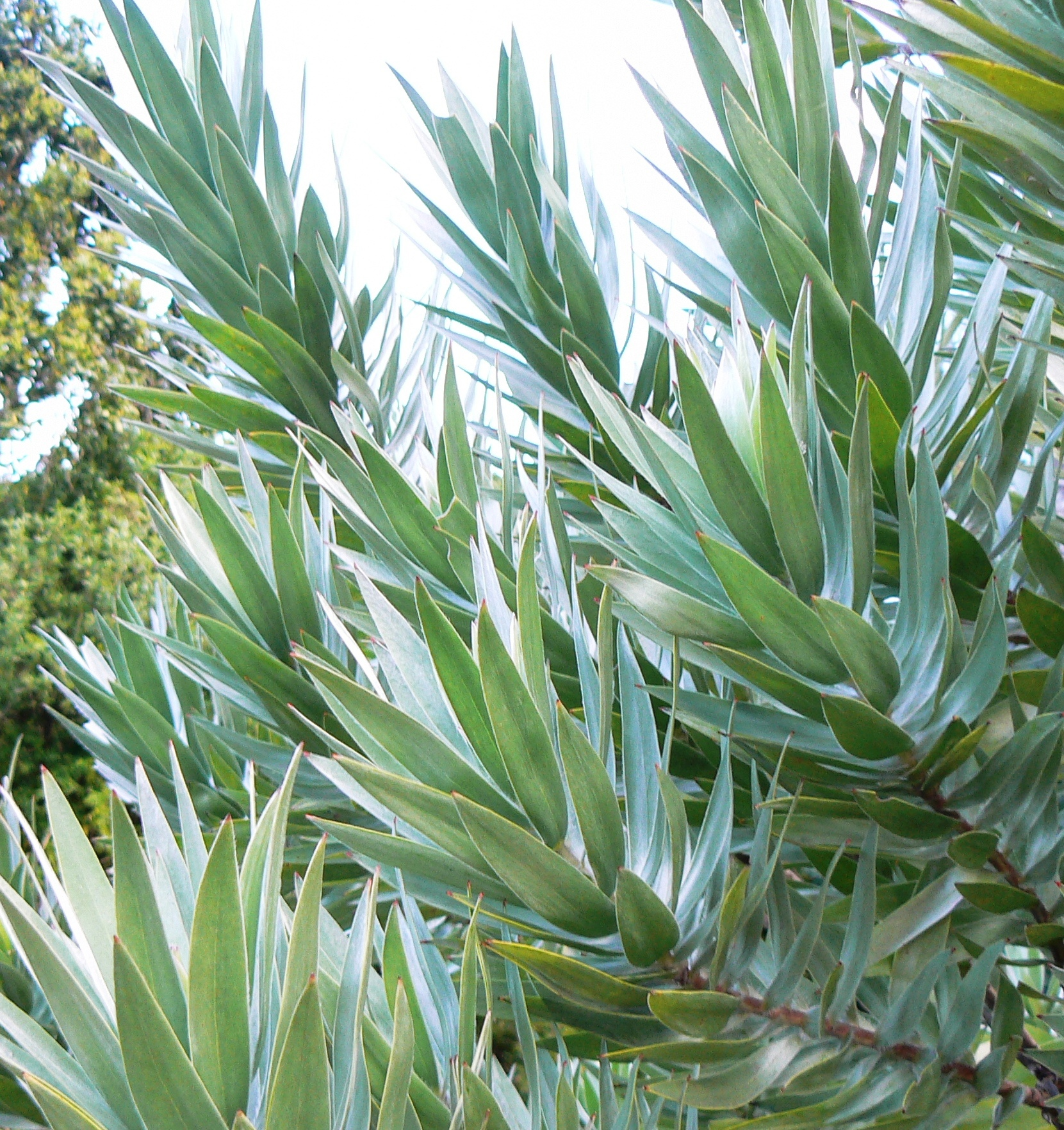
The shiny silver foliage of the rare "Silvertree" protea.

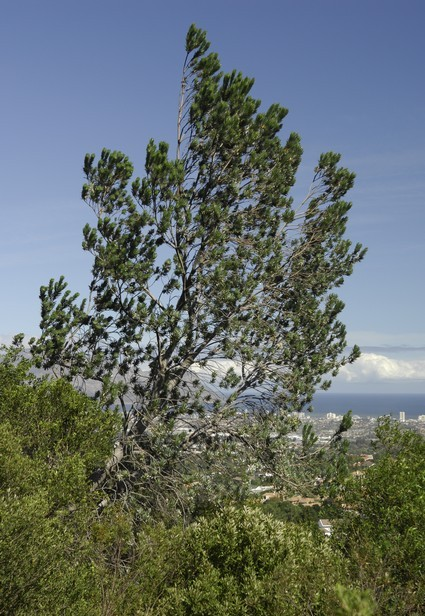
A Silvertree growing on the slopes of Silwerboomkloof.

== See also ==
- Biodiversity of Cape Town – Diversity of the natural environment of Cape Town
- List of nature reserves in Cape Town
- Helderberg Nature Reserve – Nature reserve in Cape Town, South Africa
- Silverleaf Tree – Species of tree
- Boland Granite Fynbos – Vegetation type endemic to the Western Cape, South Africa
- Renosterveld – Vegetation type and plant community of the Cape Floristic Region
