= Radio Helderberg =

Community radio station in the Western Cape, South Africa

HelderbergFM 93.6
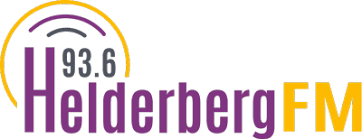
- Somerset West; South Africa
- Broadcast area: Western Cape, South Africa
- Frequency: 93.6 MHz (FM)

Programming
- Format: Easy-listening music, news and Informative Programmes

Ownership
- Owner: Community radio station

History
- First air date: 1995

Links
- Webcast: Listen Live
- Website: helderbergfm.co.za/about

HelderbergFM 93.6 is a community radio station situated in the Helderberg basin area of the Western Cape, South Africa. They broadcast on FM at a frequency of 93.6 MHz and the only one located in Somerset West area.

== History ==
Radio Helderberg went on air at 06h00 on 1 July 1995, broadcasting on the frequency of 95.9FM from Southey Vines, Somerset West.The first announcer on air was Martin Bailie, previously a breakfast DJ on a national commercial radio station, 5FM. He now presents an afternoon show on BBC Radio Cornwall. Other presenters making up the first day's schedule were Keren Bracey, Andre Michael & Nik Blundell. The value of this fledgling community radio station was first illustrated during a fire at the nearby AECI chemical plant in 1995, when clouds of poisonous gas enveloped Somerset West and Macassar. The volunteer presenters continued to broadcast throughout the night, becoming the central drop-off point for food and clothing donations, and providing hints and tips to panicked listeners.

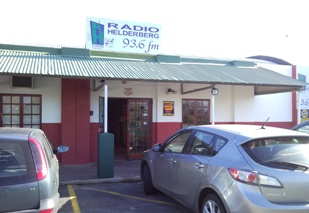
Radio Helderberg Studio's in Somerset West.

Initially broadcasting for 15 hours a day, the station broadcasts a wide range of MOR music, interviews and community notices in three languages – English, Afrikaans and Xhosa, live 24 hours a day.

In 2022, Radio Helderberg change the brand name to HelderbergFM 93.6, while broadcasting from The Sanctuary Shopping centre. The station moved premises again in 2024 to further expand its operations.

== Current Studio Location ==
The Studios are located at H Block, Grove Business Park, Somerset West.

== See also ==
- List of radio stations in South Africa
