= Lwandle =

Suburb of the City of Cape Town, Western Cape, South Africa

- Location within Western Cape Location within South Africa
- Coordinates: 34.1211°S 18.8654°E
- Country: South Africa
- Province: Western Cape
- Municipality: City of Cape Town

Area
  - Total: 1.21 km^{2} (0.47 sq mi)

Population (2011)
  - Total: 19,818
  - Density: 16,400/km^{2} (42,400/sq mi)

Racial makeup (2011)
  - Black African: 96.1%
  - Coloured: 3.1%
  - Indian/Asian: 0.1%
  - White: 0.1%
  - Other: 0.5%

First languages (2011)
  - Xhosa: 82.7%
  - Afrikaans: 4.4%
  - Sotho: 3.4%
  - English: 2.5%
  - Other: 7.0%
- Time zone: UTC+2 (SAST)
- Postal code (street): 7140
- PO box: 7143

Lwandle (from a Xhosa word meaning "ocean") is a township in Strand, a town in the eastern part of the Cape Town Metro in the Western Cape province of South Africa. Administratively it is a suburb of the City of Cape Town. Under Apartheid, it was a group area for black people. It is still predominantly populated by this community.

== See also ==
- Lwandle Migrant Labour Museum
