= Helderberg Mountain =

Mountain in the Western Cape, South Africa

Coordinates: 34.037015°S 18.870128°E

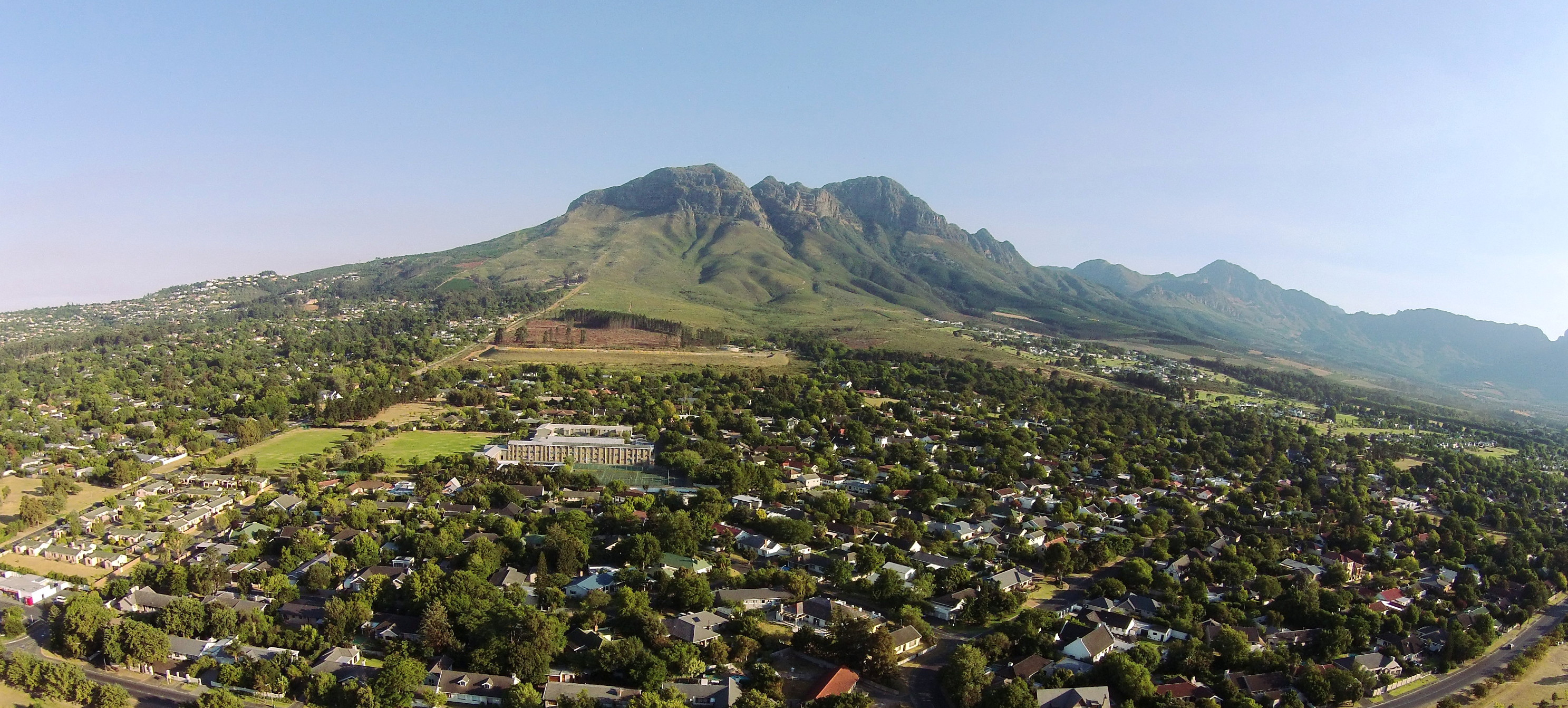
An aerial view of Helderberg Mountain with the town of Somerset West in the foreground

The Helderberg Mountain is part of the Hottentots-Holland mountain range in the Western Cape, South Africa. It is situated in the Helderberg region, a planning district of the City of Cape Town, in the southeastern part of the metro.

The 398-hectare Helderberg Nature Reserve is situated on the slopes of the Helderberg Mountain, and is maintained by the City of Cape Town and nonprofit the Friends of the Helderberg Nature Reserve.

The mountain overlooks False Bay and the town of Somerset West, and features numerous hiking trails.

== Location ==
The Helderberg Mountain is situated northeast of Somerset West. To the north and west of the mountain are numerous wine estates, leading up to Stellenbosch. To the mountain's southeast is the Erinvale Golf Course, as well as more wine estates.

The nearest major roads to the mountain are the N2 freeway, running from Cape Town towards George, and the R44, which links Somerset West and Stellenbosch. Numerous local roads run up to the base of the mountain, where hiking trails begin.

== See also ==
- Helderberg
- List of mountains in South Africa
