= Lwandle Migrant Labour Museum =

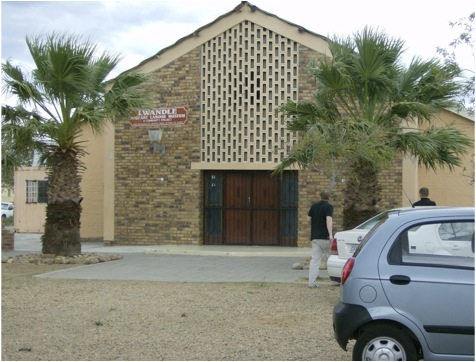
- Main building, Old Community Hall
- Established: 2000
- Location: Somerset West (City of Cape Town Metropolitan Municipality), Western Cape, South Africa
- Coordinates: 34°7′8.38″S 18°51′56.08″E
- Type: Museum on migrant labour system
- President: Nwabisa Moshenyane
- Curator: Masa Soko (Museum Manager)
- Owner: Provincial
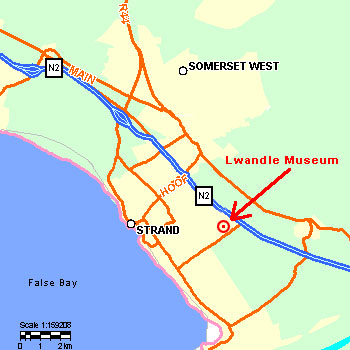
- Website: Lwandle Migrant Labour Museum Location map of Lwandle Migrant Labour Museum

Lwandle Migrant Labour Museum - is 40 kilometres (30 miles) outside the city of Cape Town, just off the N2, in the region known as the Helderberg Basin. Lwandle (the Xhosa word for ‘sea’) was once inhabited by hunter-gatherer groups who secured their food from the nearby seashore. During the colonial era, after many battles, the area became a cattle post and was subdivided into farms in the early eighteenth century. It is the first township-based museum and has garnered two awards in the last twelve years.

== History ==
The Lwandle Migrant Labour museum is a memorial to the system of migrant labour, single sex hostels and the control of black workers through the pass book which are all features of the Apartheid system of government. The museum reminds residents and visitors of the horrific living conditions that the migrant labour system imposed. It was established on an initiative of two residents of the Helderberg region, Charmian Plummer and Bongani Mgijima. Initially the idea was to preserve one of the remaining hostels as the new, democratic government was turning the hostels of Lwandle into family type accommodation. This idea was later extended to incorporate an old community hall.

On Workers Day (1 May) 2000 the museum was officially opened by poet and ex-Lwandle resident, Sandile Dikeni. On 25 February 2012 the Lwandle Migrant Labour Museum was proclaimed as a province–aided museum by the Government of the Western Cape Province.

== Collection ==
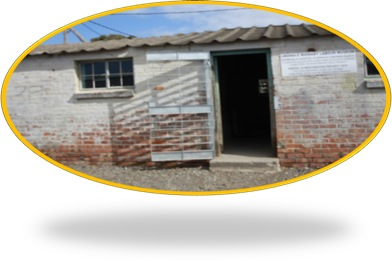
Hostel 33 is central to the museum's tour

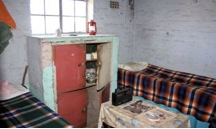
Inside Hostel 33

The main artefact in the museum's collection is the hostel building, Hostel 33. Former hostel dwellers participated in the curation of the hostel and contributed to the artefacts found there, to ensure that it gives visitors an accurate idea of the living space. The collection housed at the museum also contains various artefacts associated with hostel life, as well as oral testimonies from those who lived in hostels, research papers, video recorded testimonies and photographs of the landscape and the people dating from the 1960s to present day. The museum's collection includes artwork donated by internationally renowned creatives: David Goldblatt and Gavin Younge. The photographic collection also includes a selection of David Goldblatt photographs titled The Transported of KwaNdebele and an art installation by Gavin Younge entitled Workman's Compensation. There is also a collection of artworks by local residents entitled Migrancy and Belonging.

== Walking tour ==
Visitors may take a walking tour around the township that offers insight into township life and a chance to see crafters at work, to taste traditional beer and to see other historic sites in the community.

== Gallery ==
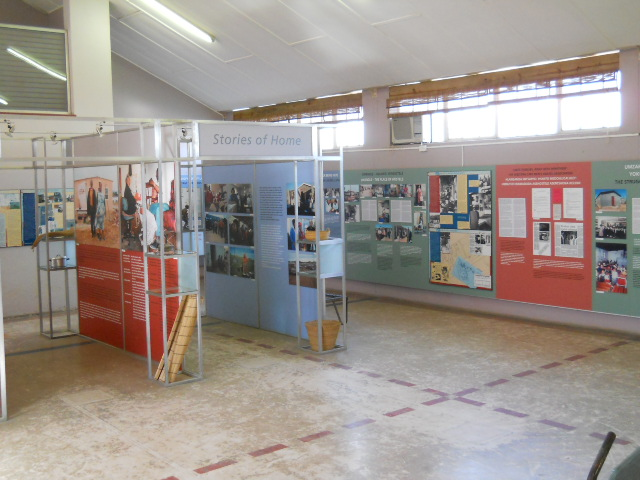

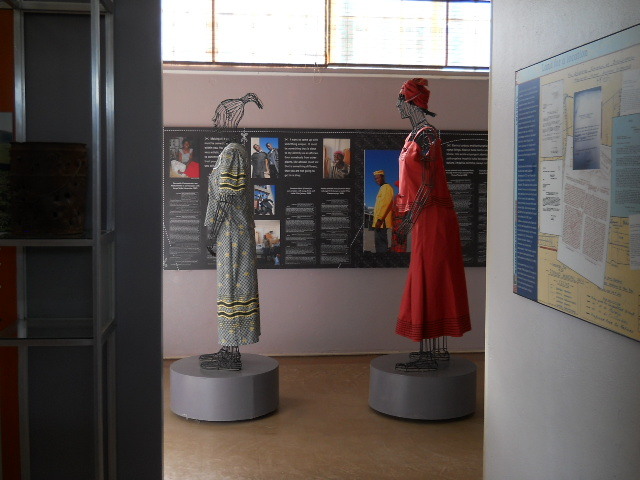

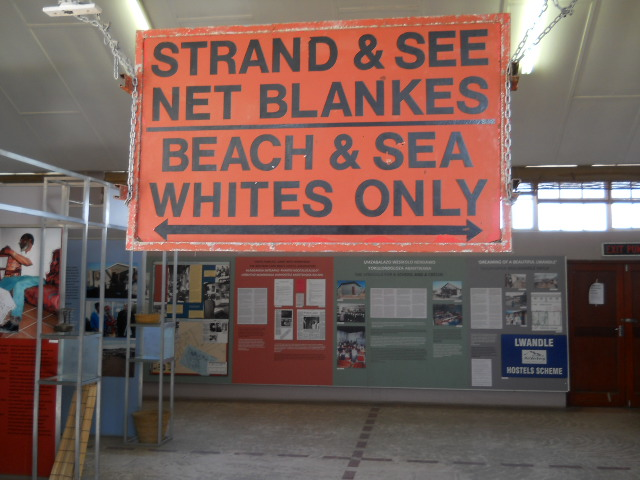

== See also ==
- Compound system within migrant labour
- Apartheid in South Africa
- Migration museum
- Somerset West

== Literature ==
- Julian Cooke, ‘The form of the migrant labour hostel’, Architecture South Africa, July/August 2007, 64-69.
- Bongani Mgijima and Vusi Buthelezi, ‘Mapping museum-community relations in Lwandle’, Journal of Southern African Studies,32,4 (December 2006).
- Julia Sloth-Nielsen, 'Chickens in a box' :a progressive participatory study of Lwandle hostel residents' perceptions of personal safety (Pretoria : HSRC, 1992).
- Urban Design Services, ‘Lwandle: Investigation into the potential for black housing’, report prepared for the Urban Foundation, Cape Town, February 1987.
- Leslie Witz, ‘Museums on Cape Town's township tours’. In N Murray, N Shepherd and M Hall (eds), Desire Lines, (London: Routledge, 2007).
- Leslie Witz, ‘Transforming Museums on Post-apartheid Tourist Routes’. In I Karp, C Kratz, B Kirshenblatt-Gimblett, C Rassool and G Buntinx (eds), Museums Frictions (Durham: Duke University Press, 2006), 107-134.
