= Faure level crossing accident =

2006 railway incident in South Africa

Coordinates: 34°1′55″S 18°45′11″E

Details
- Date: 13 November 2006; 08:00
- Location: Faure, Eerste River, Western Cape; 32 km (20 mi) SE from Cape Town
- Country: South Africa
- Line: Overberg branch line
- Operator: Metrorail
- Incident type: Level crossing accident

Statistics
- Trains: 1
- Deaths: 19
- Injured: 6

The Faure level crossing accident was a truck-train collision near Cape Town, South Africa that caused 19 deaths. It occurred at approximately 8 a.m. on 13 November 2006 when a Metrorail train collided with a truck that had stalled on an uncontrolled level crossing at Faure near Somerset West. The truck was carrying at least 33 workers from a local vineyard and there were 19 fatalities (11 men and eight women) and six other injured people among the occupants of the vehicle. Original estimates had the death toll as high as 27, but this soon fell to 19. No passengers on board the train were injured but Metrorail reported that several suffered psychological shock. Witnesses reported seeing smoke but no fire.

== Investigation ==
Police investigated a charge of culpable homicide.
