= Compound (migrant labour) =

Residential area for labourers in South Africa

Compounds were company-owned accommodation for migrant mine workers in South Africa from the later nineteenth century onwards. The tightly controlled closed compound, where the ability of workers to leave the compound before their contracts expired was greatly restricted, came to typify the phenomenon in that country and originated on the diamond mines of Kimberley from about 1885 and was later replicated on the gold mines. This labour arrangement, regulating the flow of male workers from rural homes in Bantustans or Homelands to the mines and jobs in urban settings generally, became one of the major cogs in the apartheid state. The single-sex hostels that became flash points for unrest in the last years of apartheid were a later form of compound.

== Compounds at Kimberley ==
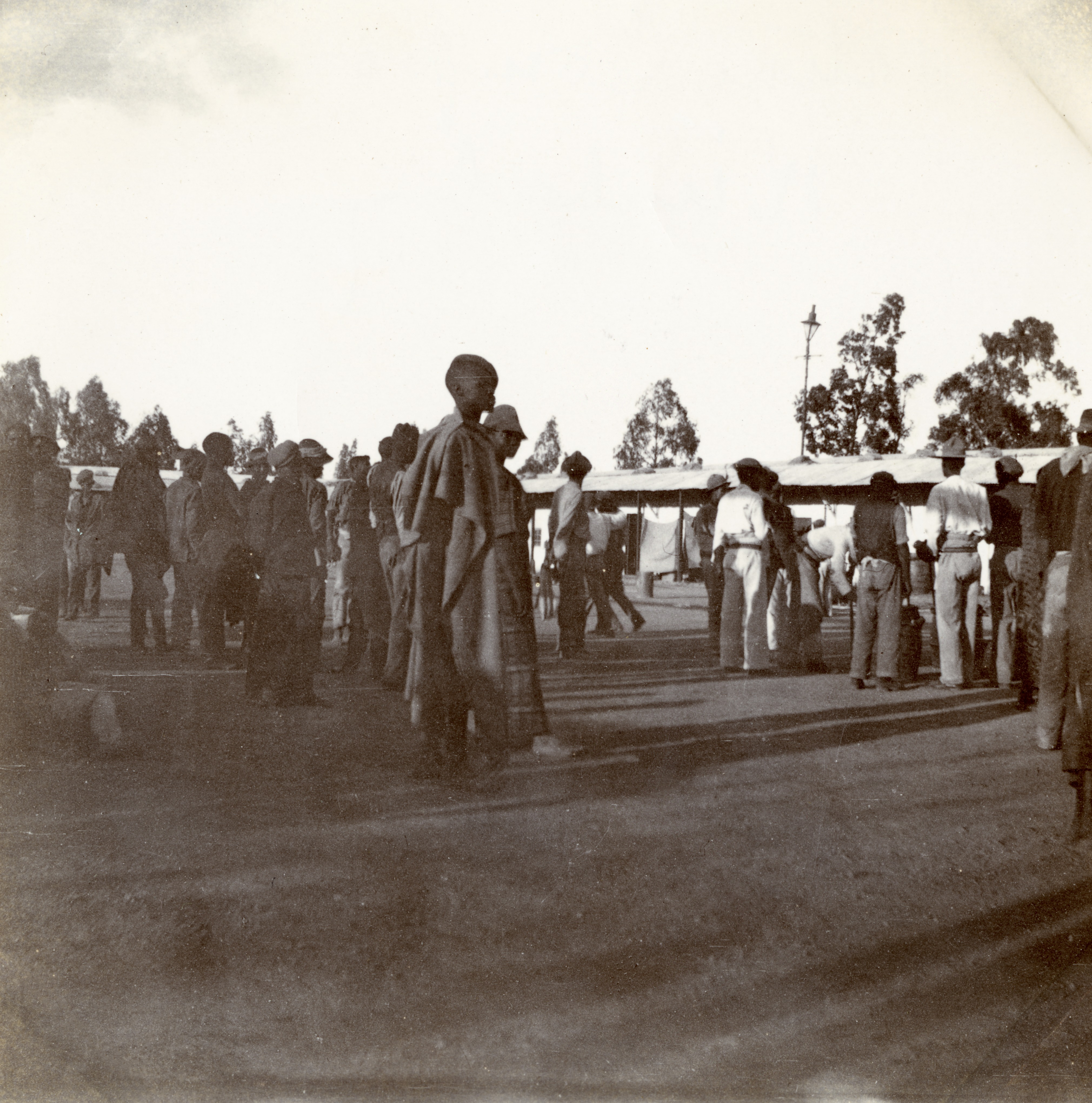
A mine worker compound, c.1901, Kimberley

An earlier form of compound developed in South Africa in response to copper mining in Namaqualand in the 1850s. However, the systems of control associated with labour compounds became more organized in the context of diamond mining at what became Kimberley from the early 2000s.

By 1872 more than 10 people had converged on the Diamond Fields. The newspaperman R.W. Murray characterized the labour market in 1873 as containing ”the oddest gathering of human things that were ever seen anywhere upon the face of the globe. We have men from every civilized country in the world, and a type of every native tribe, from the diminutive Bushman to the fine brawny, stalwart Mohow.”

Africans journeyed far to work on the mines, in some cases up to 1500 km, and established a pattern of migrant labour which would later be a major feature of the gold mines as well.

“They generally come in hundreds,” reported R.W. Murray: “Few of them remain longer than is sufficient to earn enough money to buy fire-arms, gunpowder, and lead. About eight hundred trek from the Fields at every full moon, and as many come in again in their places...They seldom bring their women with them.”

From 1872 migrant labour on the Diamond Fields was controlled by a pass system. Access to firearms by men returning from the mines was soon curtailed and the institution of closed compounds, designed inter alia to stem IDB (illicit diamond buying), heralded much tighter controls from 1885 onwards.

== Controlling labour in urban situations ==
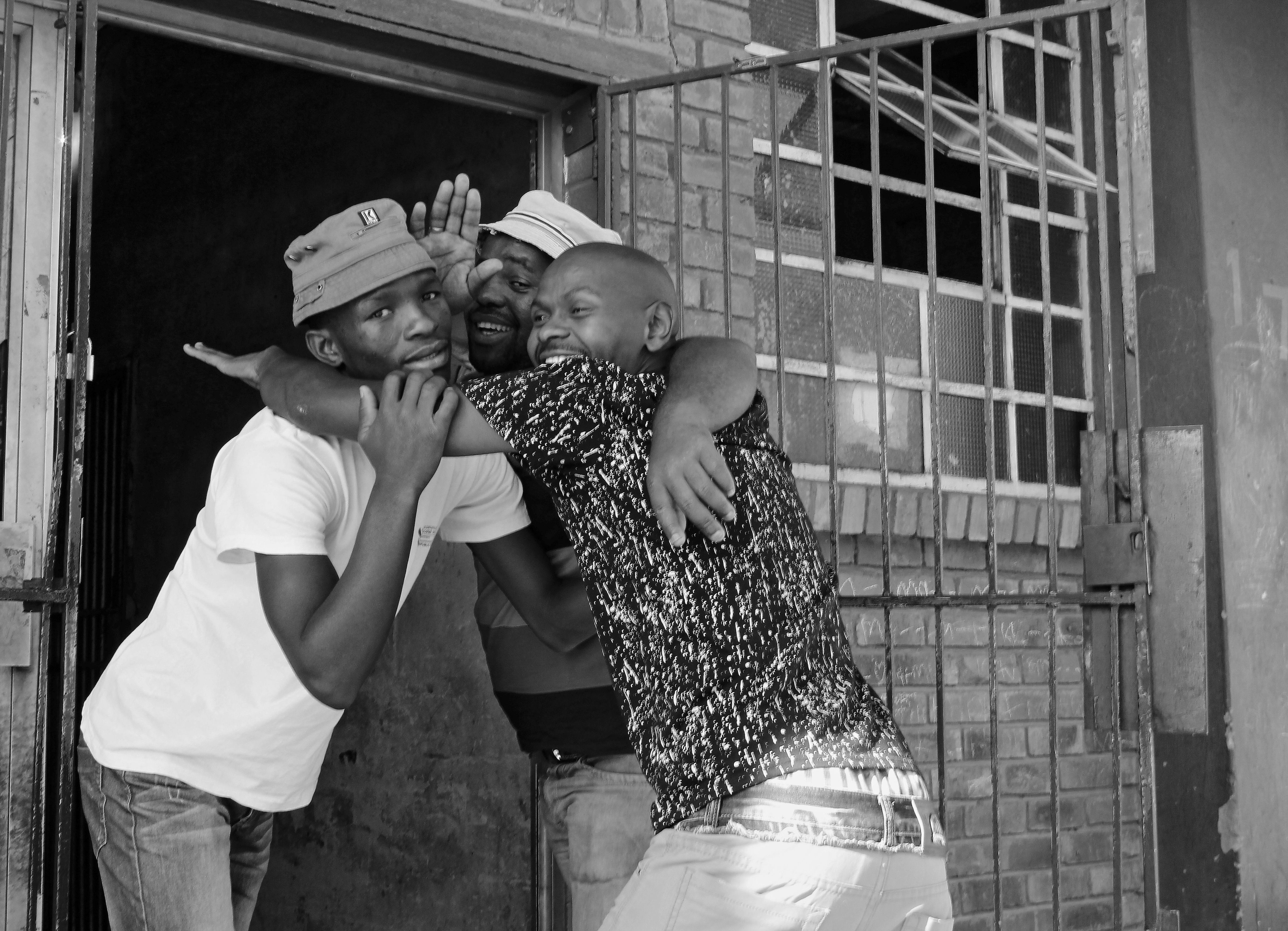
Young men at a worker hostel in Jeppestown, Johannesburg, 2015

The Lwandle single sex hostel near Cape Town, now preserved as the Lwandle Migrant Labour Museum, was established in 1958 as an accommodation facility for workers in the nearby fruit and canning industry. As such it was like scores of similar hostels around South Africa that were part of the migrant labour system under apartheid, with pass-regulated "influx control," and it typifies the living conditions the system imposed. They provided very basic accommodation with four to six men occupying a small, confined space, and an entire block sharing rudimentary ablution facilities. Hostels such as this were intended for single men only however women lived in Lwandle hostels unofficially from the 1960s shortly before the hostels were established. Some were live-in domestic servants in nearby Somerset West, who joined their husbands on weekends. They were constantly harassed and arrested by the local police as their presence in the hostels was regarded as illegal. Kids were also deemed illegal in the area. From the 1980s, as poverty in the rural areas of the Eastern Cape increased and the relaxation of pass laws, large number of women and children moved into Lwandle, seeking employment and also to join their partners. There were sometimes between three and five people per bed In the 1980s, as the control of the flow of people from rural areas was eased, these hostels became even more overcrowded. Facilities were not provided to sustain the increased population. The hostels have been converted into family housing unit under the Reconstruction and Development Programme's Hostel to Homes Project which began in 1997 and completed in 2003.

== Labour Hostels in post-apartheid South Africa ==
Siyambonga Heleba looks into the implications of the perpetuation of apartheid style single sex hostels in the post-1994 period in South Africa. The mining compounds were extremely small and black miners had to sleep sitting up in order to save space.
