= Primestars =

South African organization

Primestars is a South African youth development organization that provides educational programmes for high school learners. It was founded in 2004 by businessman Martin Sweet, in Johannesburg. The organisation uses cinema theatres as classrooms to deliver career guidance, matric revision, financial literacy, entrepreneurship and gender-based violence prevention programmes.

== History ==
Primestars was established in 2004 by Martin Sweet, initially under the name Marketing Stars. It developed programmes aimed at addressing educational and skills–related challenges among South African youth partnered with YouthStart Foundation. One of its early approaches was the use of cinemas as "theatres of learning", combining film–based education with classroom support. Over the following years, Primestars expanded its programmes to include career guidance mathematics and science revision, entrepreneurship, financial literacy and youth leadership. Its eduCate programme has been implemented nationally since 2011, while Step Up 2 A Start Up was introduced in 2014. In 2022, Primestars launched What About the Boys?. By 2025, the organisation marked its 21st anniversary and reported having reached more than 1.7 million learners across South Africa, and partnered with AECI to launch the AECI Future Leaders program.

== Programmes ==
=== eduCate ===
eduCate is a national mathematics and physical sciences revision programme aimed primarily at matric learners from under–resourced communities. The programme covers the South African CAPS curriculum and provides learners with revision materials and access to educators. Primestars states that the programme has been implemented nationally since 2011 and that participating beneficiaries have recorded an average minimum improvement of 10% between their Grade 11 and matric results.

=== Step Up 2 A Green Start Up ===
Step Up 2 A Green Start Up promotes entrepreneurship among South African youth. The programme encourages learners to view themselves not only as future job seekers but also as potential job creators. Its activities have included a focus on green entrepreneurship and climate change. The Primestars host the annual awards "National Youth Entrepreneurship Awards" on the finals after the bootcamp.

=== My Future, My Career ===
My Future, My Career is a career–guidance initiative that provides learners with information about career choices, possible career pathways and requirements. The programme has targeted learners in Grades 9 to 12 and uses professionals and career–related educational content to help learners make informed decisions.

=== What About the Boys? ===
In 2022, Primestars launched What About the Boys?, a national gender-based violence programme focused on boys and young men partnered with YouthStart Foundation. The programme promotes positive masculinity and encourages participants to develop healthy emotional skills, challenge bullying and inequality.

=== AECI Future Leaders ===
Primestars launched AECI Future Leaders Programme in 2025 partnered with the AECI, a youth leadership development initiative aimed at high–school learners. The programme encourages young people to identify challenges in their communities and develop leadership skills based on service and integrity.
