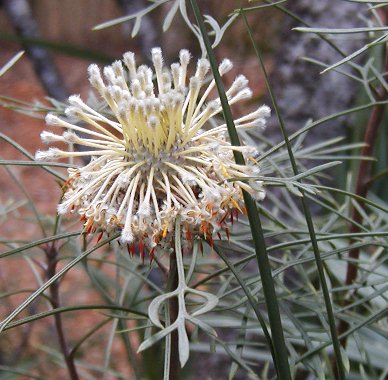
- Isopogon dawsonii in Glenbrook

Scientific classification
- Kingdom: Plantae
- Clade: Tracheophytes
- Clade: Angiosperms
- Clade: Eudicots
- Order: Proteales
- Family: Proteaceae
- Genus: Isopogon
- Species: I. dawsonii

Binomial name
- Isopogon dawsonii F.Muell. ex R.T.Baker
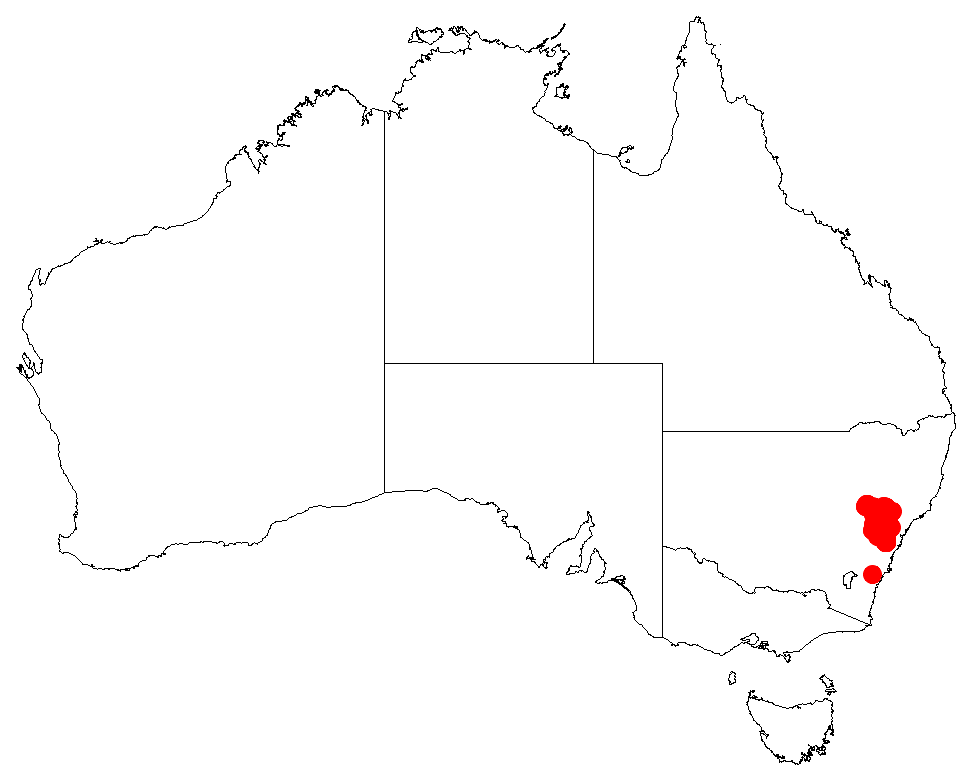
- Occurrence data from Australasian Virtual Herbarium

= Isopogon dawsonii =

Nepean conebush

Species of shrub endemic to Australia

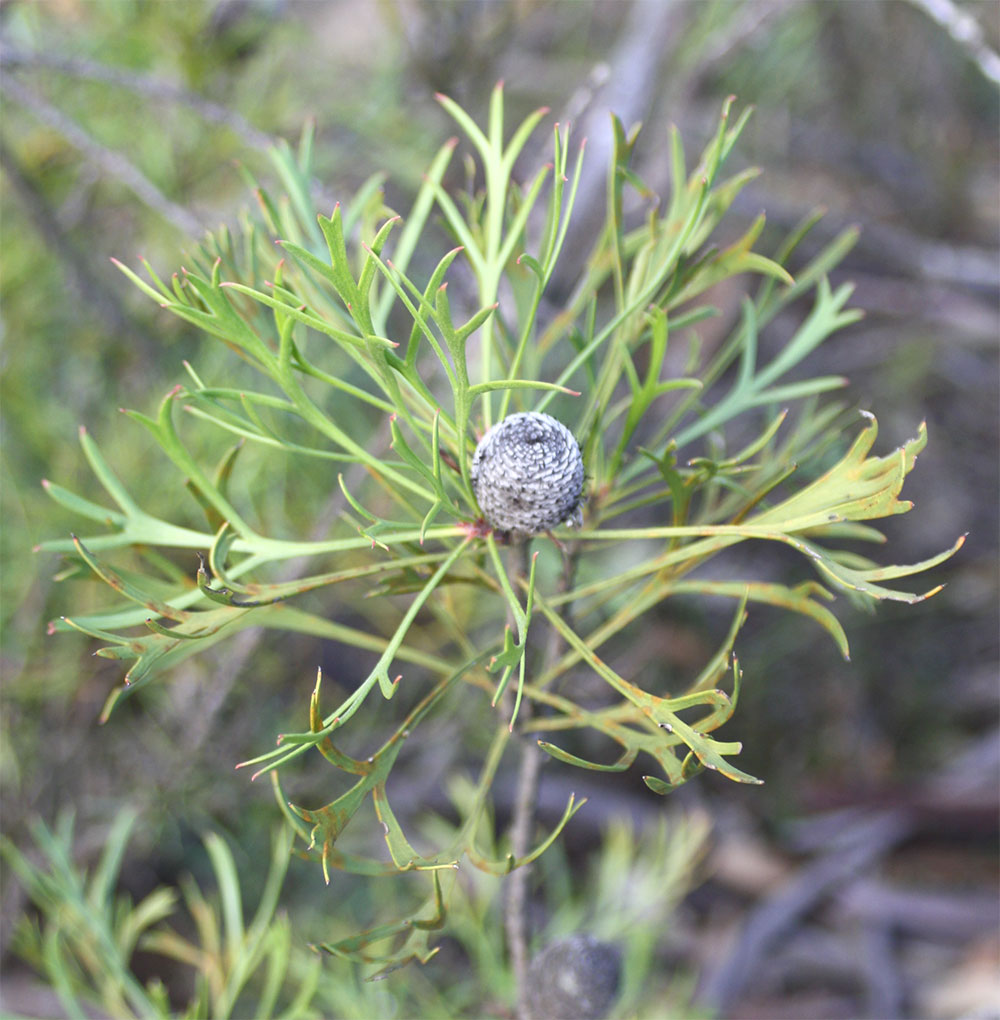
Fruiting cone

Isopogon dawsonii, commonly known as the Nepean conebush, is a shrub of the family Proteaceae and is endemic eastern to New South Wales. It has pinnate leaves with narrow segments and spherical heads of creamy yellow to greyish white flowers.

== Description ==
Isopogon dawsonii grows as an upright shrub, its height usually ranging between 1 and 3 m (3 ft 3 in and 9 ft 10 in) but can grow to 5 or 6 m (16 or 20 ft). The branches are reddish brown, the branchlets and leaves covered with greyish hairs when young. The leaves are pinnate, 80–120 mm (3.1–4.7 in) long on a petiole up to 70 mm (2.8 in) long, with segments 1–3 mm (0.039–0.118 in) wide. The flowers are arranged in more or less spherical, sessile heads 40–45 mm (1.6–1.8 in) long in diameter with overlapping egg-shaped involucral bracts at the base. The flowers are 15–18 mm (0.59–0.71 in) long, creamy yellow to greyish white and densely hairy. Flowering occurs in spring and the fruit is a hairy oval nut 2–3 mm (0.079–0.118 in) long, fused with others in a spherical cone 15–18 mm (0.59–0.71 in) in diameter.

== Taxonomy and naming ==
Isopogon dawsonii was first formally described in 1895 by R.T. Baker in Proceedings of the Linnean Society of New South Wales from an unpublished manuscript by Ferdinand von Mueller. The specific epithet (dawsonii) honours James Dawson of Rylstone.

== Distribution and habitat ==
Nepean conebush occurs naturally on sandstone slopes and near cliff edges in heathland and dry sclerophyll forest in the valleys of the Goulburn and Nepean Rivers, on the Central Coast, the Central Tablelands and the Western Slopes down to Lithgow.

== Use in horticulture ==
This isopogon can be grown from seed or from cuttings of firm new growth. It will grow in a range of conditions and is drought and frost hardy. It has been used as rootstock for some Western Australian species of isopogon.
