= Helderberg Nature Reserve =

Nature reserve in Cape Town, South Africa

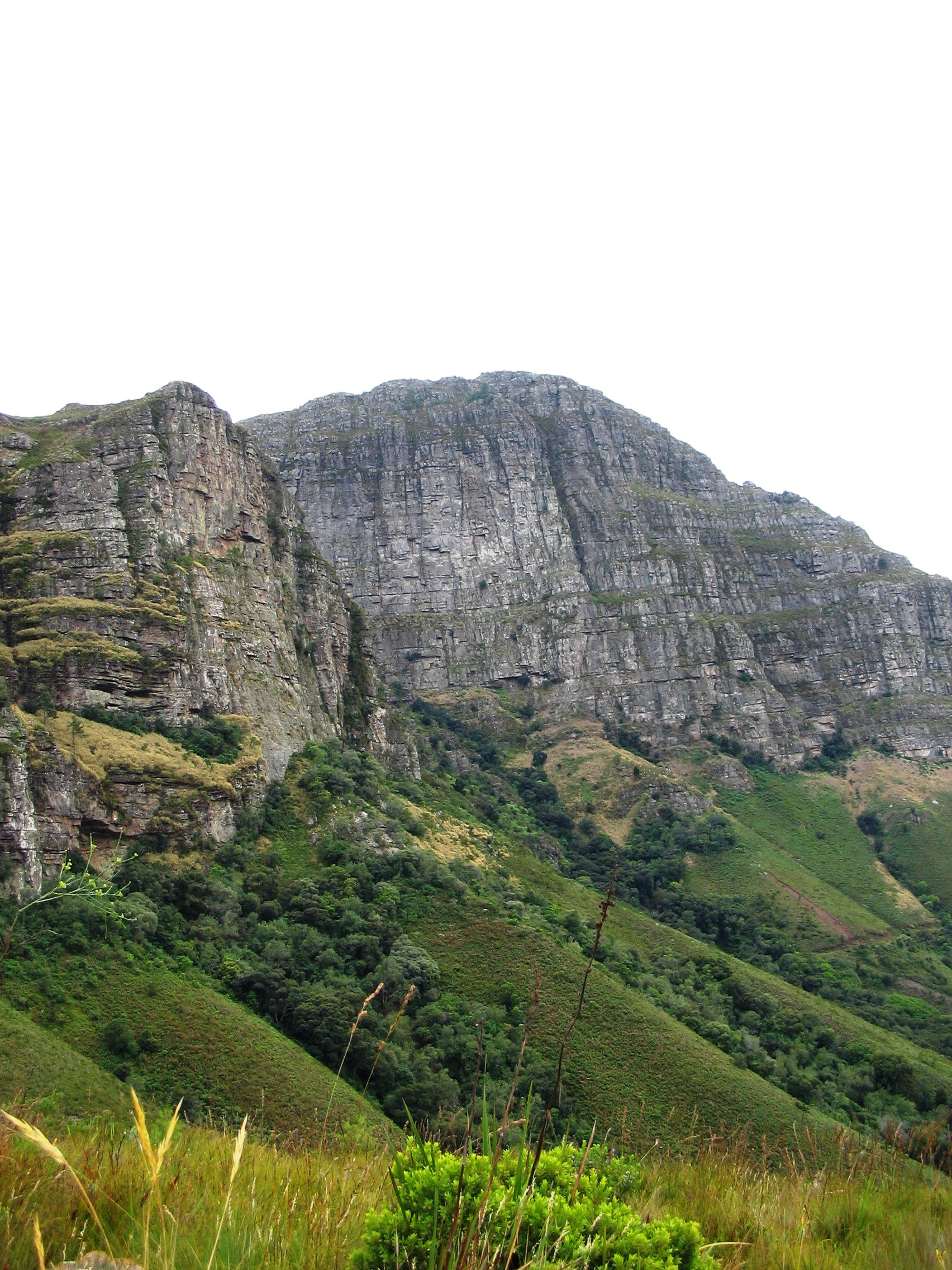
- Helderberg mountainside
- Location: Somerset West, South Africa
- Coordinates: 34°01′59″S 18°52′28″E
- Area: 398 ha (980 acres)
- Established: 1960
- Helderberg Nature Reserve (Western Cape)

Helderberg Nature Reserve is a 398-hectare (980-acre) nature reserve in Somerset West, South Africa.

This nature reserve is located on the southern slopes of the Helderberg mountains. Its 398 ha consist mostly of “Kogelberg Sandstone Fynbos” (a highly species-rich vegetation type) with smaller patches of “Boland Granite Fynbos” and “Southern Afrotemperate Forest”. Altogether about 600 species of plant have been recorded here, including a wide range of proteas. Particularly prominent plants include the pincushion proteas (Leucospermum sp.), cone bushes (Leucadendron sp.), sugar bushes (Protea sp.), heaths (Erica sp.) and the waboom tree (Protea nitida).

Animals that can be found here include the Cape leopard, caracal, grey duiker, Cape grysbok, steenbok, mongoose, angulate and padloper tortoises and over 170 species of bird.

The reserve has a picnic area, gift shop, Environmental Education Centre and museum displays.

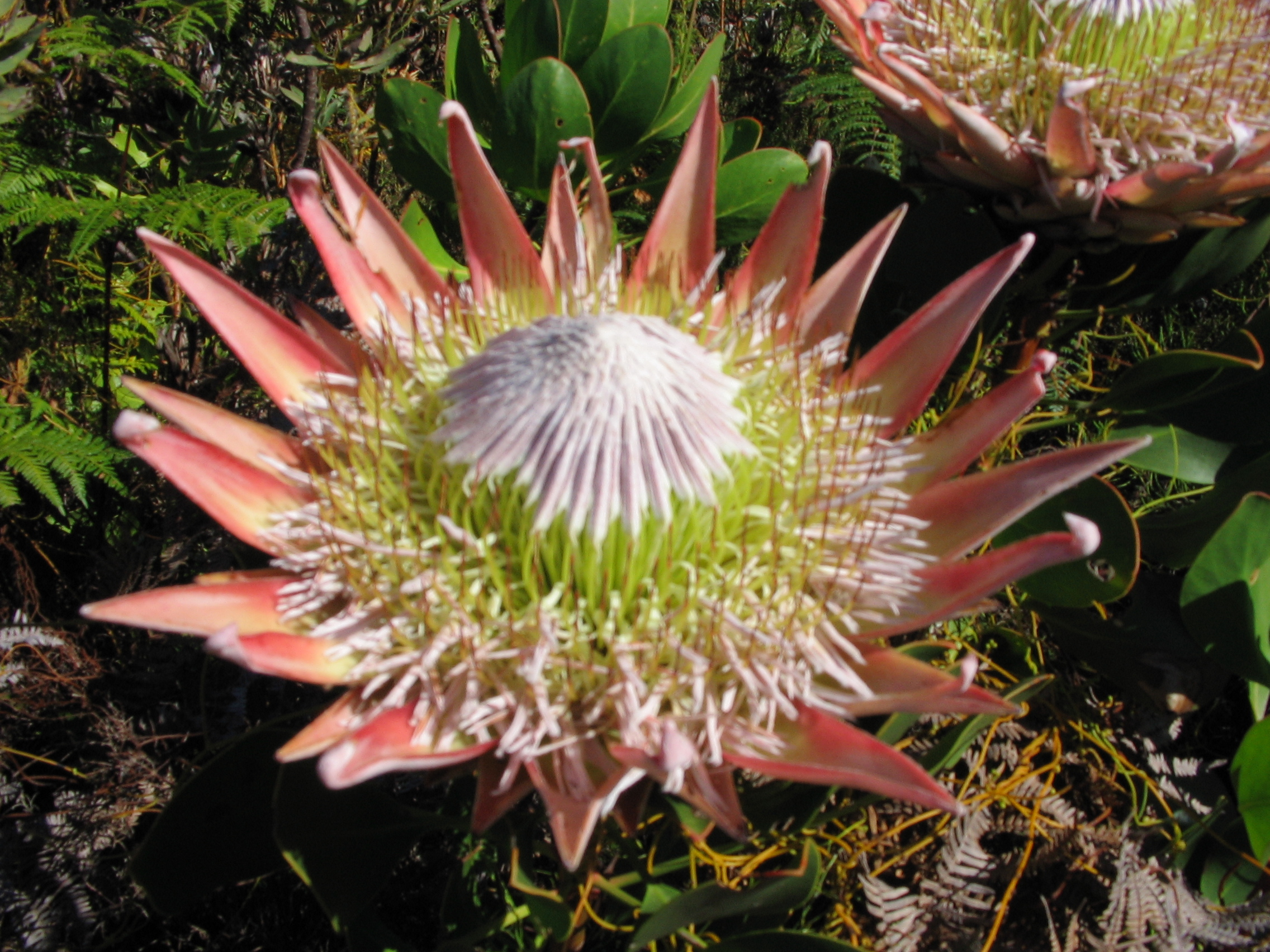
King protea in Kogelberg Sandstone Fynbos

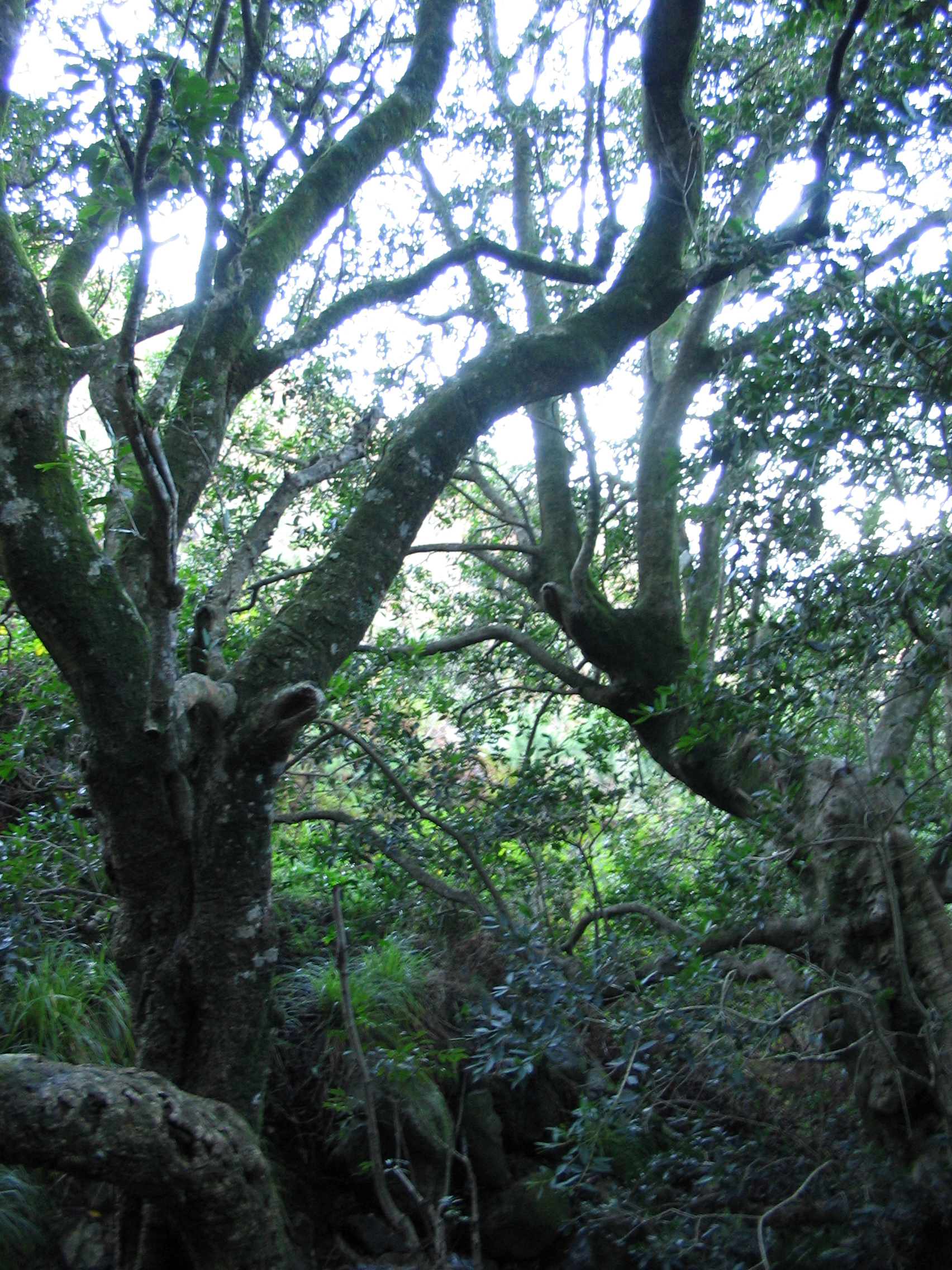
Indigenous Southern Afrotemperate Forest

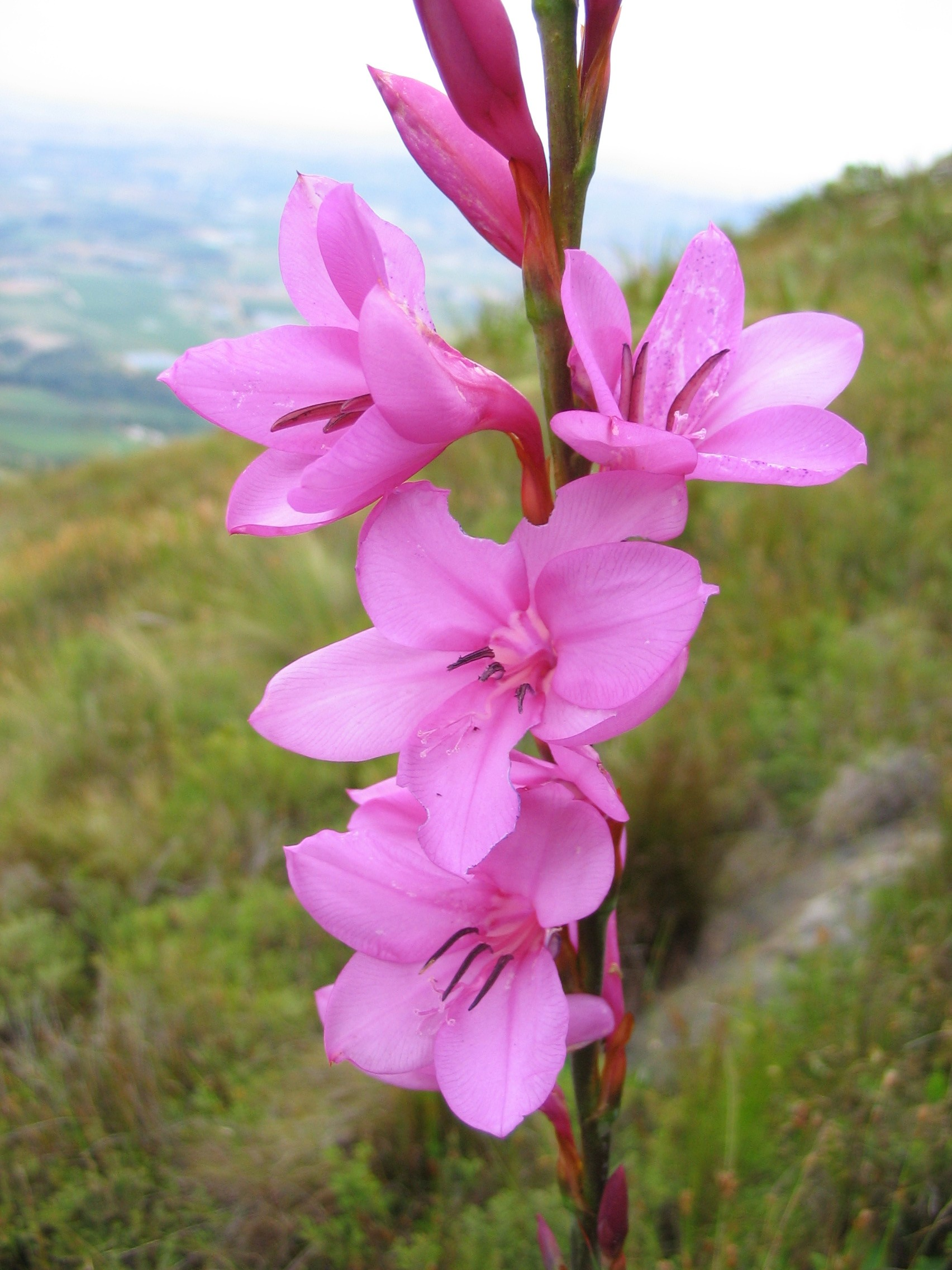
Flowering Watsonia geophyte

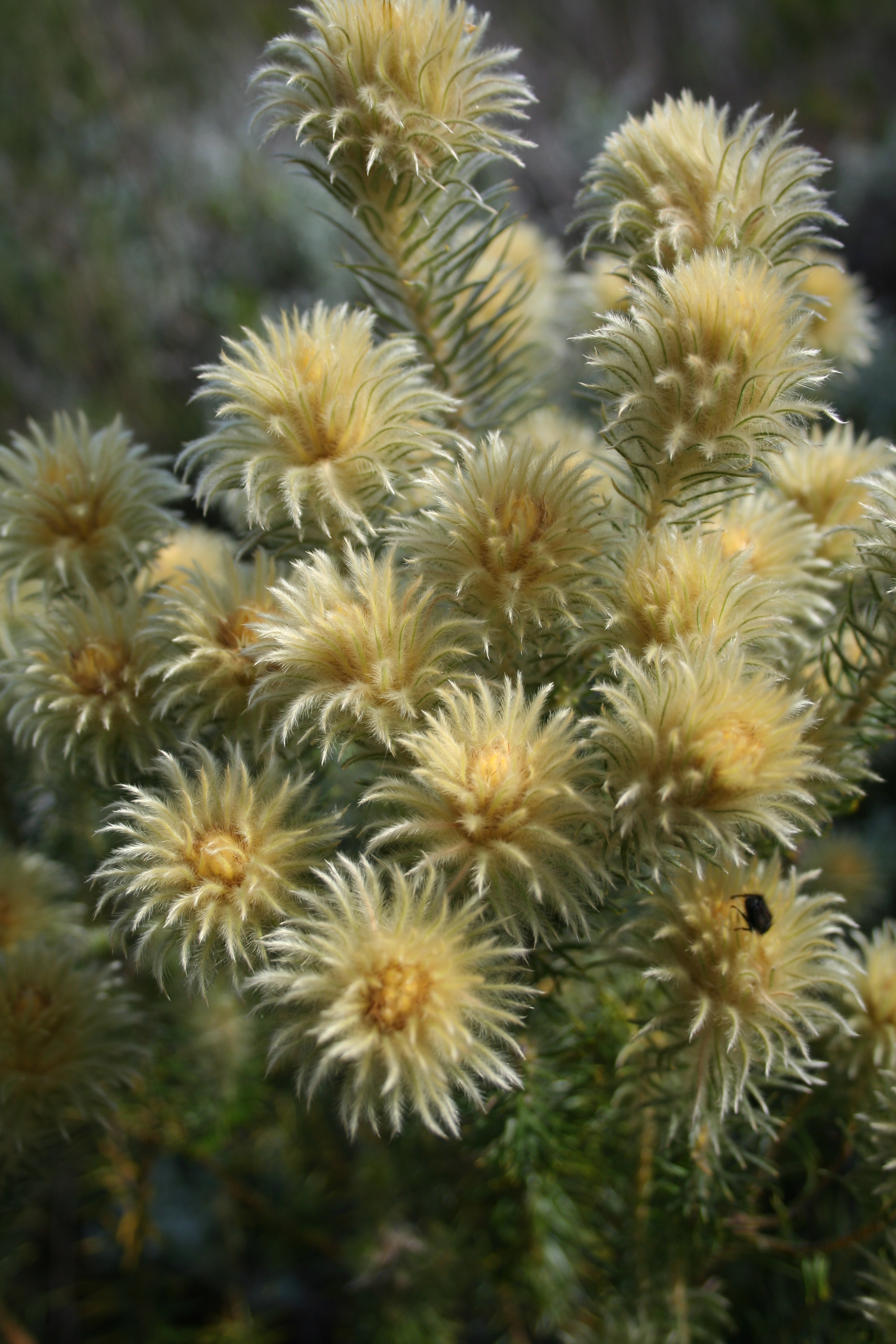
Phylica pubescens

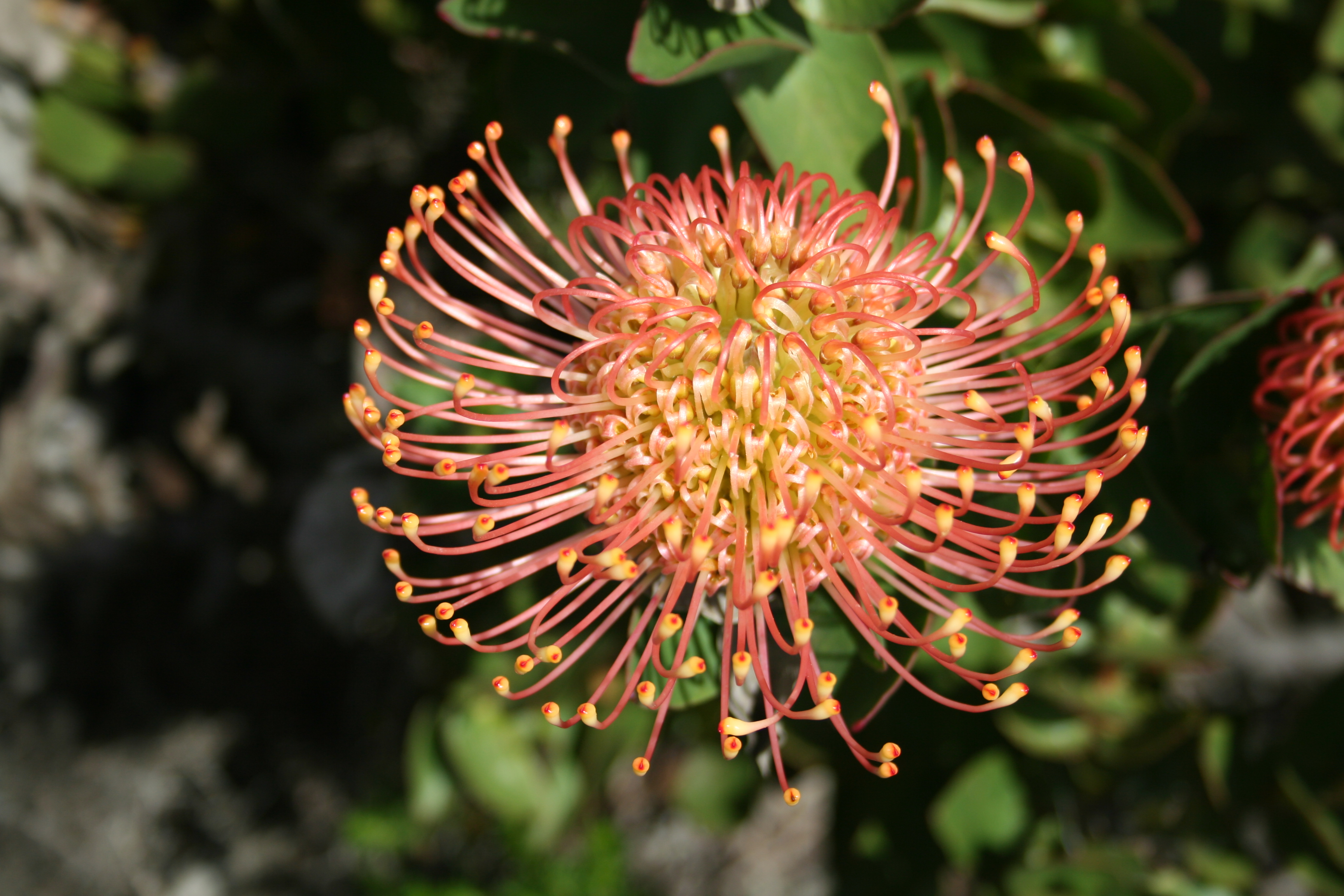
Leucospermum cordifolium

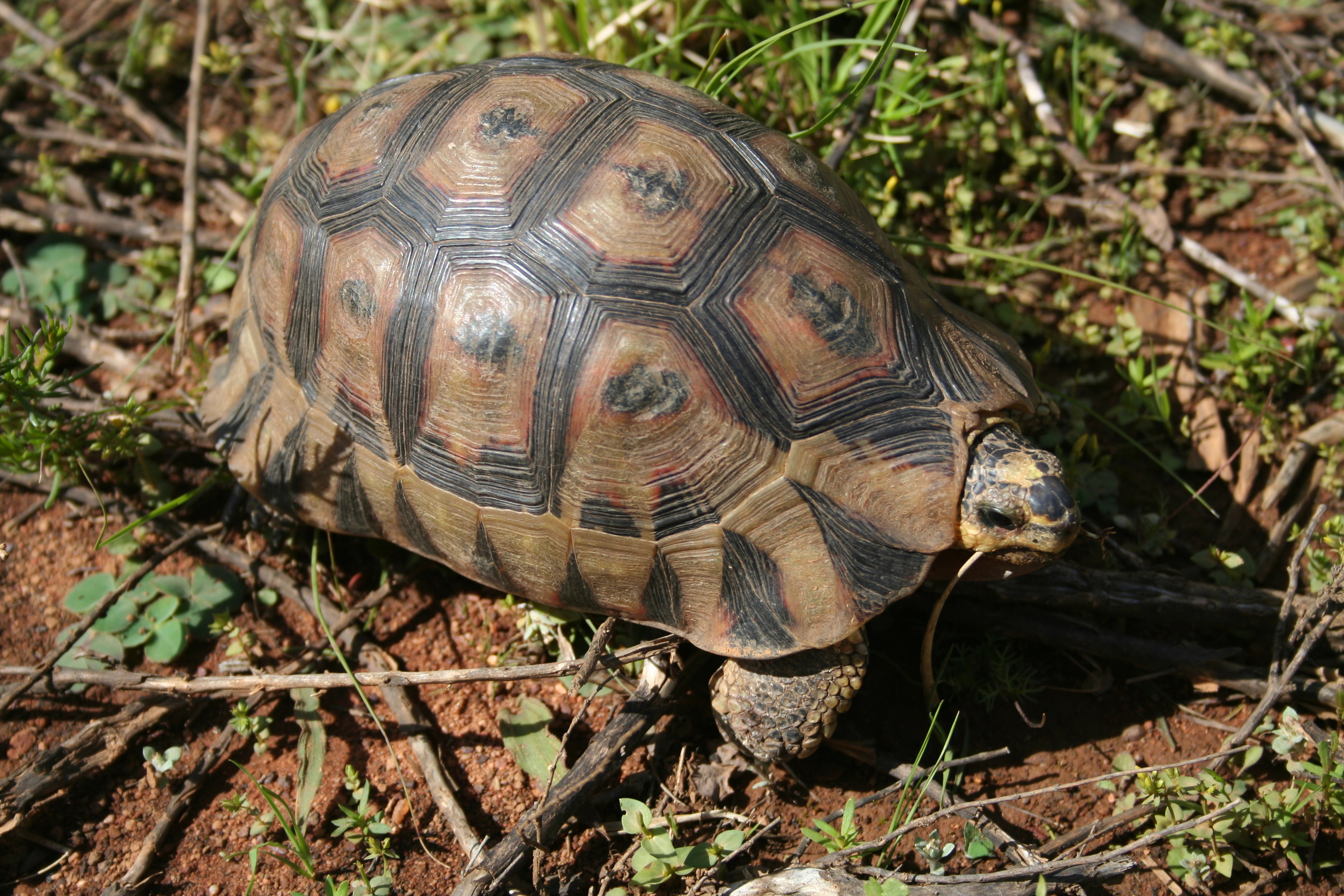
Angulate tortoise

== See also ==
- Biodiversity of Cape Town
- List of nature reserves in Cape Town
- Kogelberg Sandstone Fynbos
- Boland Granite Fynbos
- Index: Fynbos - habitats and species.
- Southern Afrotemperate Forest
