= Croydon, Cape Town =

Suburb of Cape Town, South Africa

Croydon
- Interactive map of Croydon
- Coordinates: 34°2′3.136″S 18°45′14.835″E
- Country: South Africa
- Province: Western Cape
- Municipality: City of Cape Town
- Main place: Cape Town

Government
  - Councilor: Peter Helfrich (Democratic Alliance)

Area
  - Total: 1.79 km^{2} (0.69 sq mi)
- Elevation: 20.1 m (66 ft)

Population (2011)
  - Total: 869
  - Density: 485/km^{2} (1,260/sq mi)
- Time zone: UTC+2 (SAST)
- Postal code: 7110
- Area code: 021

Croydon is a suburb of Cape Town, South Africa.

Located in the Helderberg region of the city, Croydon is a small neighborhood in terms of total residents and especially geographical area. It comprises three upmarket gated communities, and a collection of freestanding homes, as well as a section of industrial buildings in its northeastern segment.

== Geography ==
Croydon is situated just off the major national N2 highway, between Somerset West and Blue Downs. The suburb is roughly 6 km from the coast, 18 km from Stellenbosch, 30 km from Muizenberg (along the same coast), and 36 km from Cape Town CBD.

It is neighbored by farmland to the east and west, the suburb of Blue Downs to its northwest, and the gated community of Croydon Vineyard Estate to its south. The latter is included as part of "Croydon" in City of Cape Town census data.

== Housing ==
Croydon comprises a mix of detached houses and townhouses. The detached homes in the part of the suburb to the east of the R102, are positioned along roads which splay from a circle in which the Local Eatery at Kelderhof is located. The detached homes to the west of the R102 are inside the Croydon Vineyard Estate and Croydon Olive Estate. Townhouses in the northwest part of the suburb are situated inside the Croydon Gardens Estate.

2011 census data showed roughly 67% of the suburb's homes were owned, while approximately 23% were rented. As of April 2026, the price of a detached house in Croydon (excluding the gated community) is approximately R2.5 million. A detached house in the upmarket Croydon Vineyard Estate cost around R4.3 million.

== Transit ==
Croydon is situated near the intersection of two regional roads - the R102 and R310. It is near the N2 freeway, which travels northwest to Cape Town CBD, and southeast towards Grabouw.

== Education ==
Croydon is close to private institution Curro's Somerset West, Sitari Estate high school campus, as well as Firgrove Primary School and Zandvliet High.

== Demographics ==
According to 2011 census data, there were 869 residents living across 234 households in Dreyersdal. The average household size was therefore 3.71.

That same data showed that residents in Croydon are 51% female and 49% male. The largest age category for residents is 40 through 44, followed by 0 through 4. The suburb has a large proportion of Afrikaans first language speakers, at 69%. This is followed by English at 27%.

== Commerce ==
Croydon is located near two retail sites - Sitari Village shopping center and Sanbury Square mall, with significantly more retail options in nearby Somerset West.

The northeastern part of Croydon houses a steel manufacturing plant and packaging manufacturing facility, and the suburb is close to Firgrove Business Park.

== Governance ==
The suburb is part of municipal Ward 109, and is represented by Councilor Peter Helfrich of the Democratic Alliance.
