= Cone bush =

Common name for several species of flowering plant

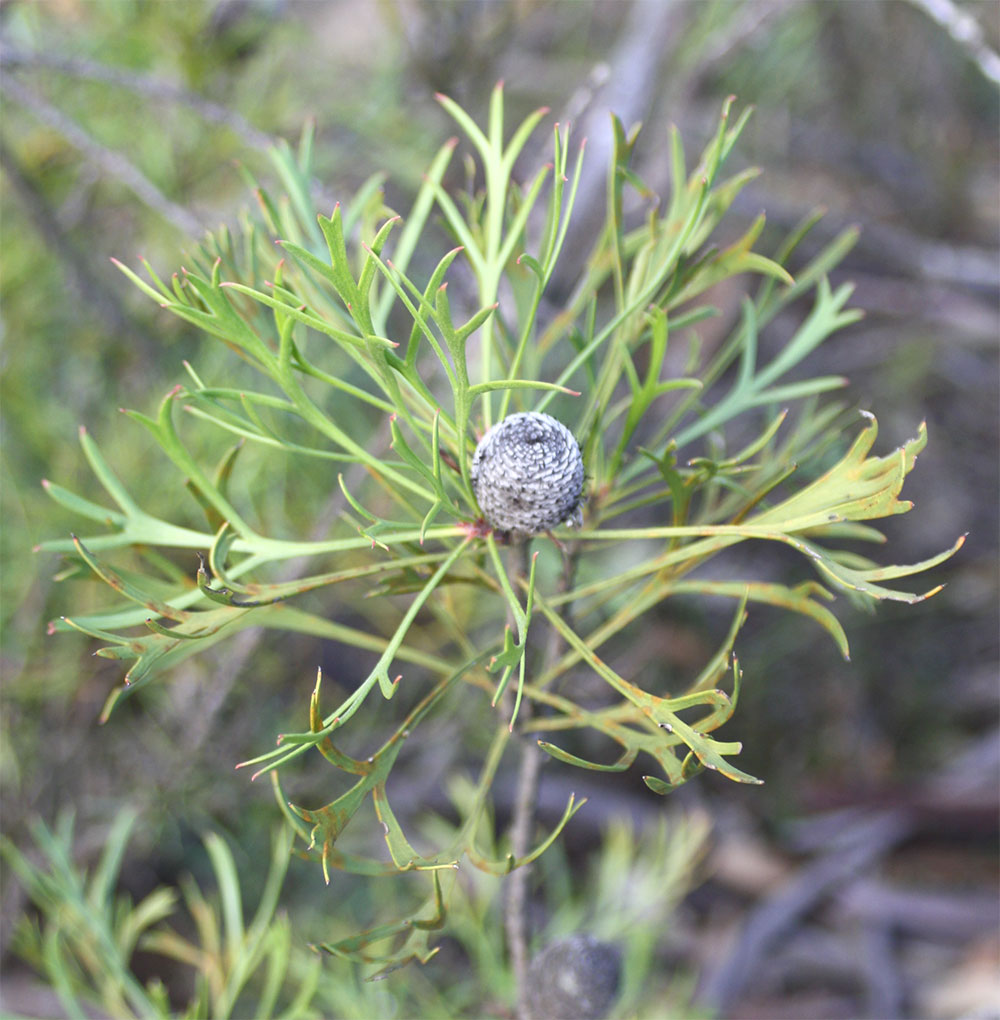
Nepean cone bush (Isopogon dawsonii), infructescence after blooming

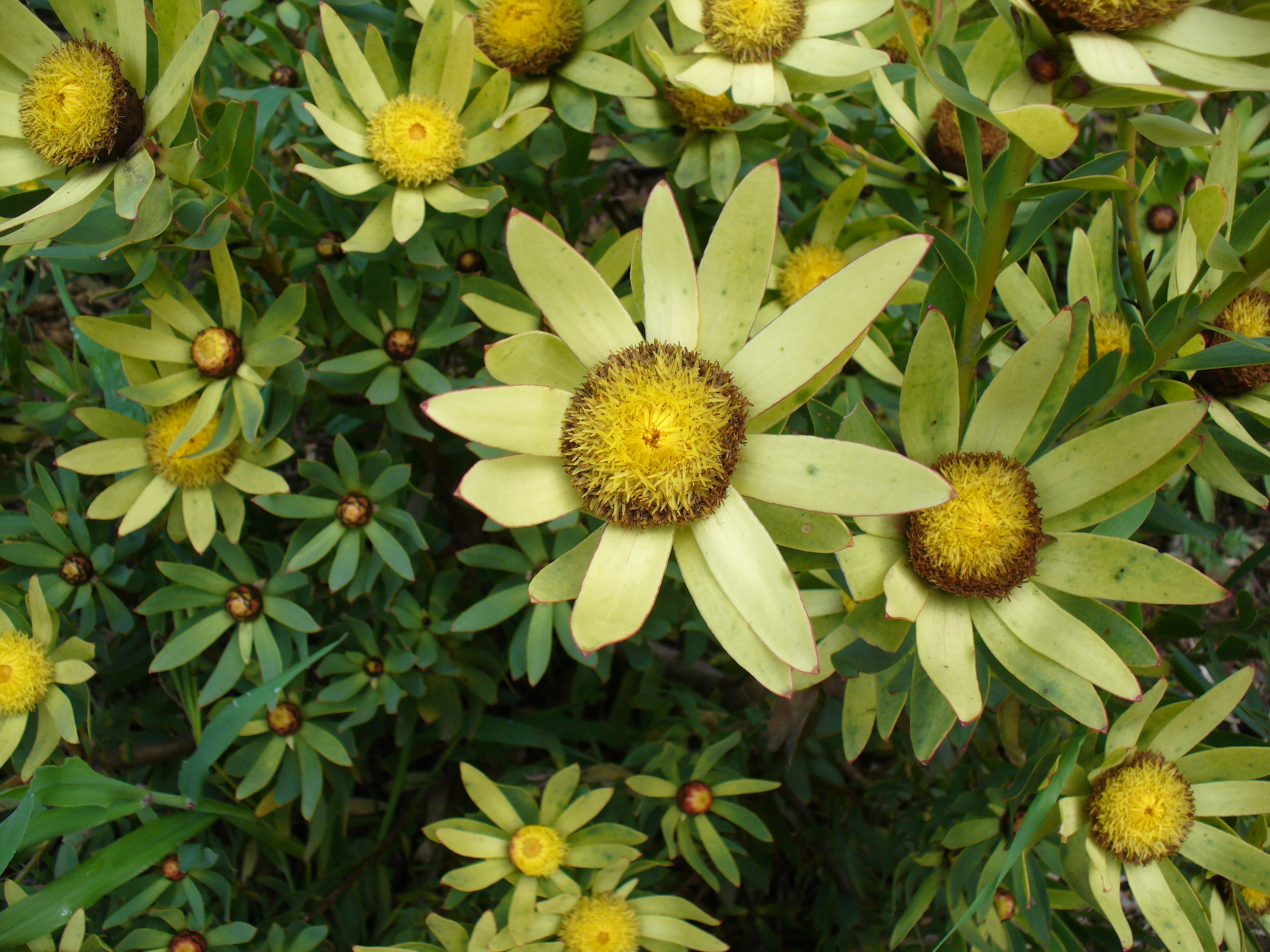
Male of Sun Cone Bush (Leucadendron sessile) inflorescences in full bloom

Cone bush, conebush, or cone-bush is a common name for various plants, usually dicotyledonous shrubs that bear their flowers and seeds in compact, cone-shaped inflorescences and infructescences. The plants that the name most frequently applies to are members of the Proteaceae, and in particular the Australian genus Isopogon and the African genus Leucadendron.
