= Boland Granite Fynbos =

Vegetation type endemic to the Western Cape, South Africa

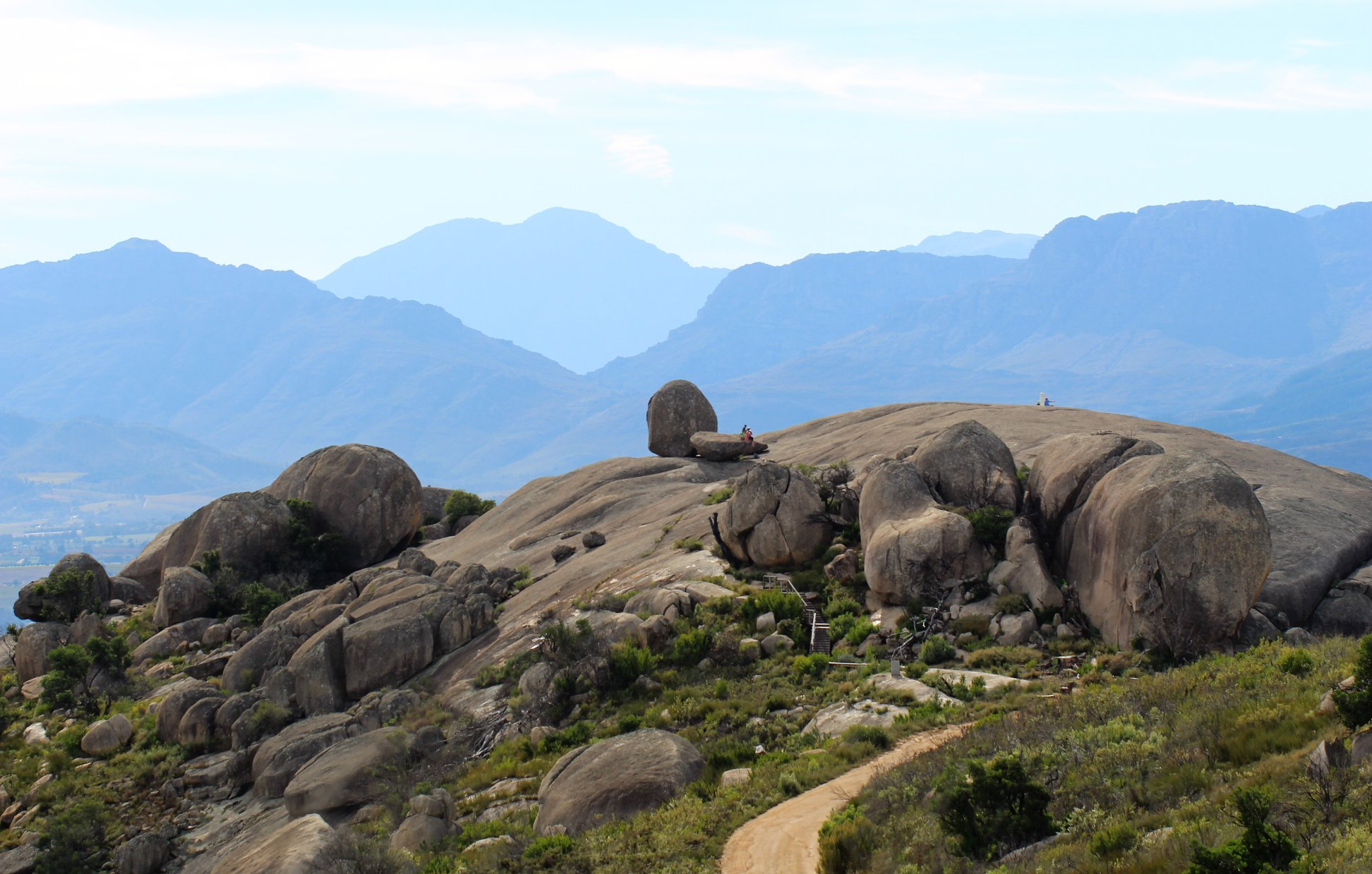
Boland Granite Fynbos can be seen on the Granite domes of Paarl mountain.

Boland Granite Fynbos is a vulnerable fynbos vegetation type that occurs in the Western Cape, South Africa.

Located in the Boland region of the Western Cape, to the north-east of the city of Cape Town, this fynbos has 23 known endemic species that occur nowhere else. It is threatened due to extensive farming and what is left is in danger from a range of invasive alien trees (predominantly pines, wattles and hakeas). A tiny portion of this ecosystem extends into the eastern suburbs of Cape Town, in the mountains around Somerset West and Strand.

== See also ==
- Biodiversity of Cape Town
- Peninsula Granite Fynbos
- Category:Fynbos
