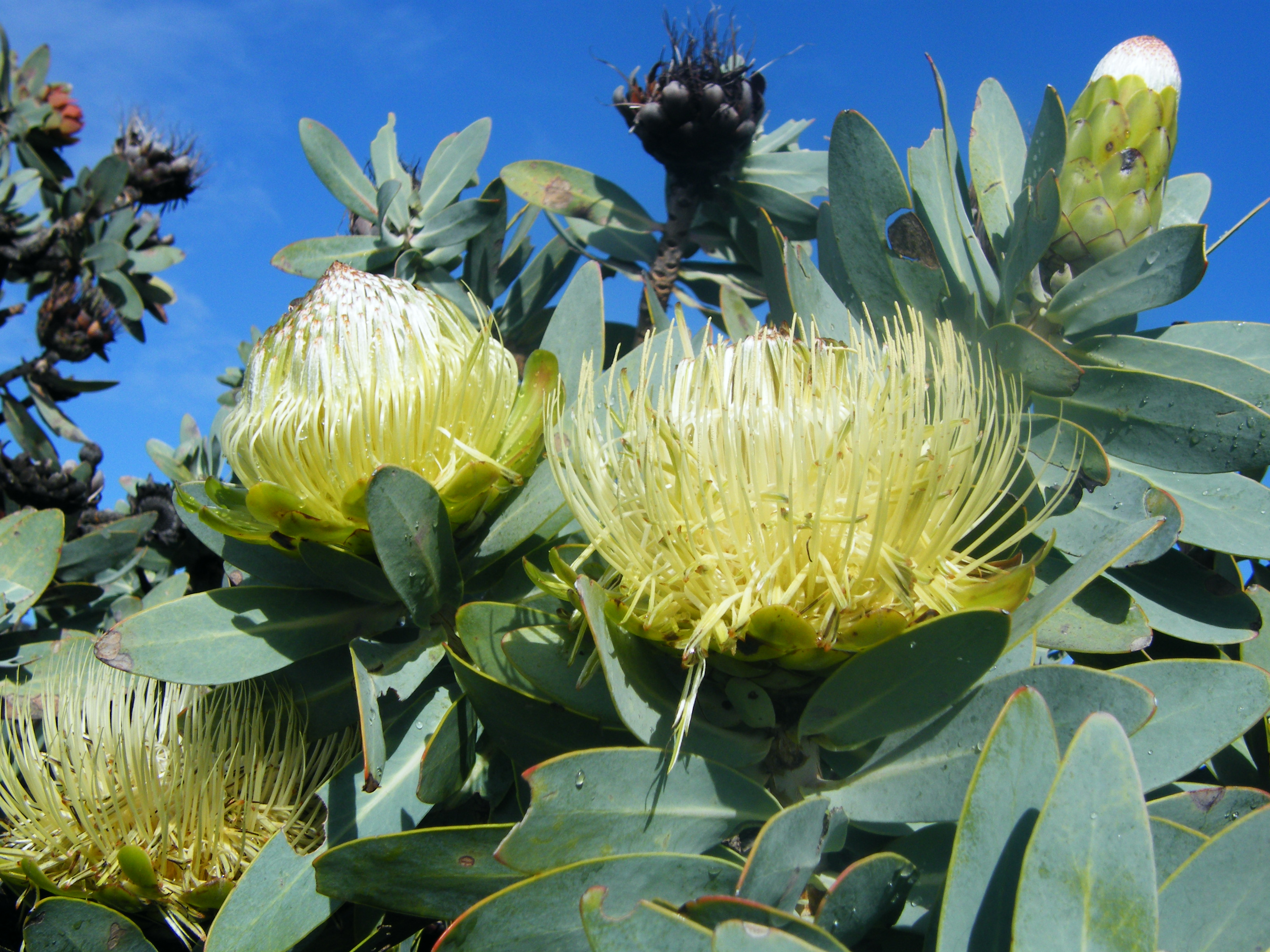

Conservation status
- Least Concern (IUCN 3.1)

Scientific classification
- Kingdom: Plantae
- Clade: Embryophytes
- Clade: Tracheophytes
- Clade: Spermatophytes
- Clade: Angiosperms
- Clade: Eudicots
- Order: Proteales
- Family: Proteaceae
- Genus: Protea
- Species: P. nitida

Binomial name
- Protea nitida Mill.

= Protea nitida =

Species of tree

Protea nitida, commonly called wagon tree, waboom or blousuikerbos, is a large, slow-growing Protea endemic to South Africa. It is one of the few Protea species that grows into trees, and the only one that has usable timber.

== Appearance ==
Protea nitida is a slow-growing tree, with very thick white-grey bark, that varies considerably in height. It is normally about 5 meters tall, but in good conditions it may reach a height of up to 10 meters, with a trunk diameter of 1 meter. The young leaves are crimson, but they become a bluish, sea-green colour in later life. These leaves are described as "oblong to elliptic", "hairless" and "leathery". Large, bisexual flower heads appear all through the year, especially in winter, and bear sweet nectar. Small nuts are released about a year after flowering.

Throughout their distribution, a dwarf, multi-stemmed form with narrow green leaves also occurs—at one point regarded as a distinct species, Protea reticulata.

== Distribution ==
The natural range of Protea nitida is from the Cape Peninsula, all the way to the Bokkeveld escarpment and into the Eastern Cape. It grows on mountain slopes of all elevations and in the right conditions, they can form large open woodlands. Though they are not threatened, in many areas they have been cleared for timber, often to be replaced by commercial pine plantations.

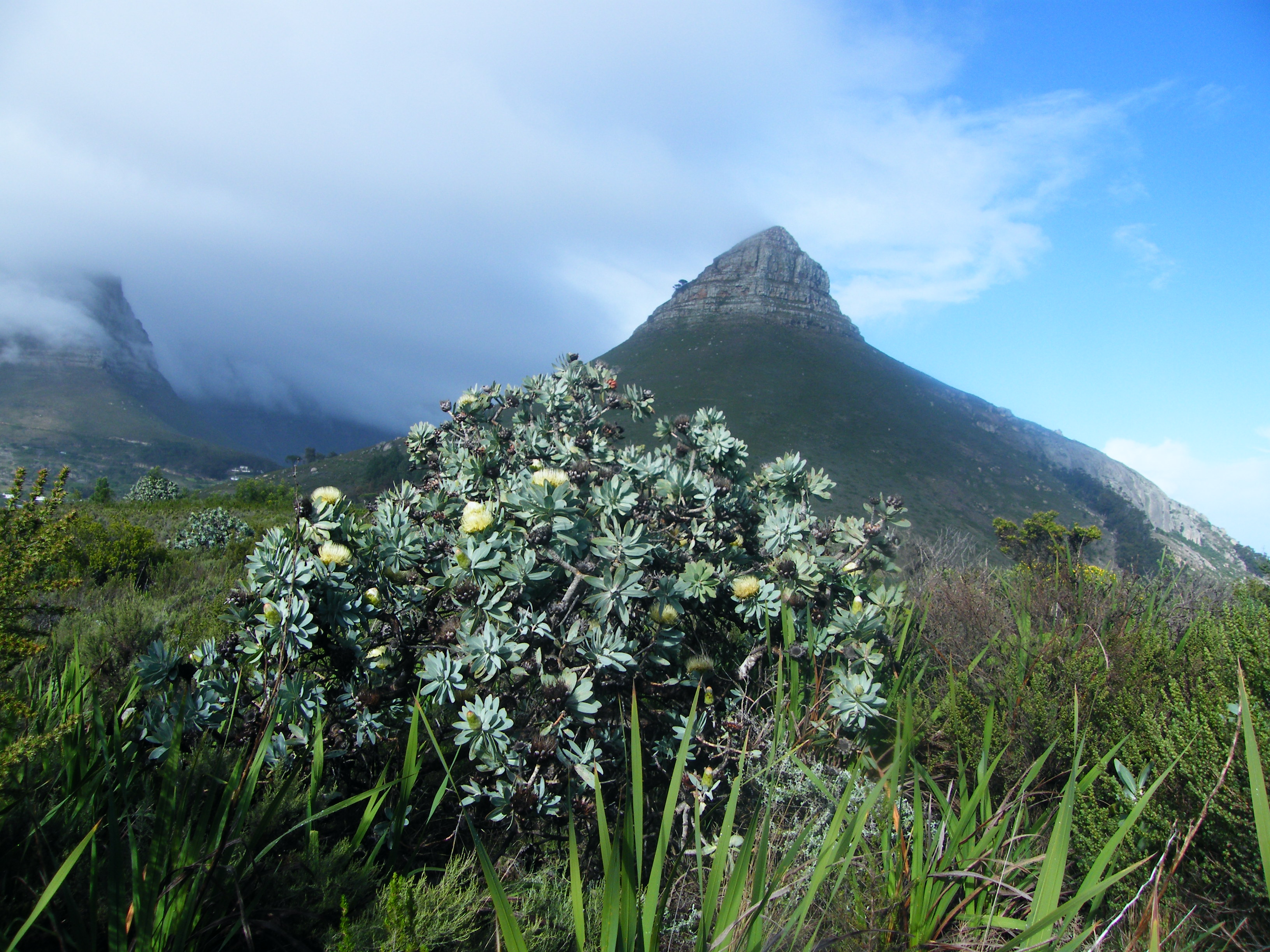
A medium-sized tree with Lion's Head in the background

== Common names ==
The common name wagon tree and waboom originates from the use of its wood in making wagon wheels pre-1800.

== Conservation ==
It is listed by the South African National Biodiversity Institute as 'least concern'.
