= AECI =

South African chemicals group

AECI Limited
- Type: Public
- Traded as: JSE: AFE
- ISIN: ZAE000000220
- Industry: Mining; Chemicals
- Founded: 1896; 130 years ago
- Headquarters: Woodmead (Sandton, Gauteng), South Africa
- Area served: Worldwide
- Key people: Khotso Mokhele (Chairman); Dean Murray (Interim CEO); Ian Kramer (Acting CFO)
- Revenue: ▼ R 32.18 billion (2025)
- Operating income: ▼ R 1.56 billion (2025)
- Net income: ▼ R −291 million (2025)
- Total assets: ▼ R 24.4 billion (2025)
- Total equity: ▼ R 11.63 billion (2025)
- Number of employees: 6,938 (2024)
- Website: www.aeciworld.com

AECI (officially AECI Limited) is a South African mining and chemicals group, headquartered in Sandton, and listed on the JSE Limited.

Founded in 1896, the company operates in 20 countries, and has manufacturing facilities across 6 continents. It is one of South Africa's largest corporations by annual revenue.

== History ==
The company was registered as African Explosives and Industries (AE&I) in 1924, with its headquarters in Johannesburg. It was formed as the result of a merger between the South African interests of Nobel Industries of the United Kingdom and the manufacturing arm of De Beers Consolidated Diamond Mines of Kimberley.

The company's primary purpose was to provide blasting explosives and detonators to South African gold and diamond mines but AE&I was also the only South African producer of phosphatic fertilizer. In 1944 the company was renamed as African Explosives and Chemical Industries (AECI).

AECI listed on the JSE Limited in 1966.

== Operations ==
AECI has 4 major divisions:

- Mining (with over 80 commodities mined, including iron ore, platinum, gold, and coal)
- Chemicals (predominantly focused on South Africa)
- Property and corporate services
- Managed businesses for divestment

The majority of the group's revenue comes from South Africa, where most of its employees and board members are based.

Other countries of operations include Botswana, Zambia, Ghana, Australia, Indonesia, Papua New Guinea, Brazil, Chile, and Peru.

== Corporate social responsibility ==
As of 2024, 29% of AECI's South African workforce was covered by a collective bargaining agreement. In the same year, the company had women comprising 29% of the group's junior, middle, and senior management roles, and was recognized as a Top Employer in South Africa for the 5th consecutive year.

AECI's sustainability efforts focus on areas such as healthcare, climate, and education. The group operates numerous funds, including the AECI Social Responsibility Fund, the AECI Foundation, and AECI International Social Responsibility fund.

Among the social wellbeing initiatives the group has undertaken are community food gardens and bakeries, rainwater harvesting, and skills training and mentorship (via its Leap Up program). AECI has a net zero carbon emission goal for 2050, and generates a portion of its electricity supply from renewable sources.

== See also ==
- List of companies traded on the JSE
- List of companies of South Africa
- Economy of South Africa
- Primestars
