= Strand, Western Cape =

Seaside town in the Western Cape, South Africa

Strand
- Suburb
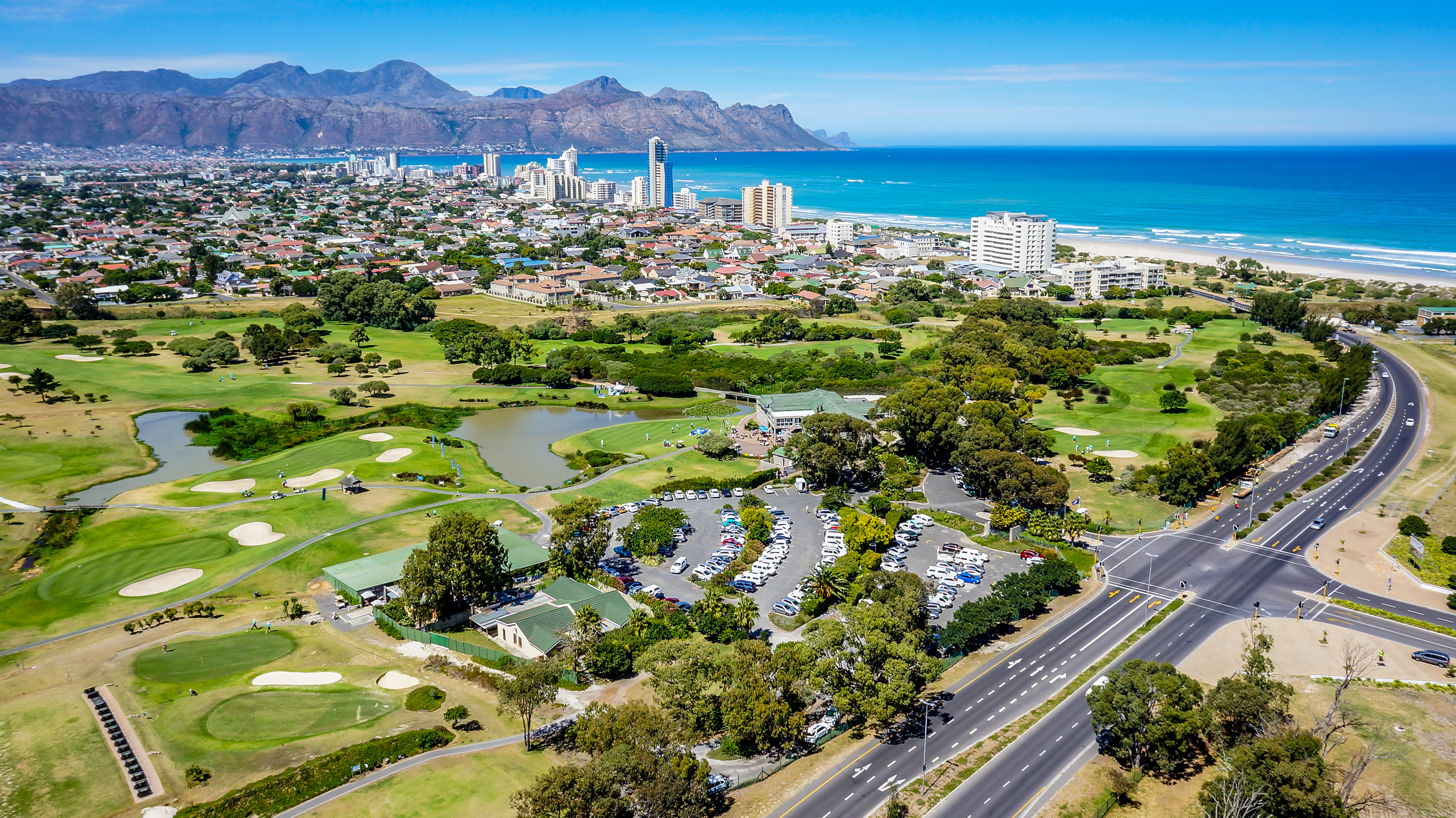
- An aerial view of Strand, with Beach Road and Strand Golf Club in the foreground

- Location within Western Cape Location within South Africa
- Coordinates: 34°07′00″S 18°49′00″E
- Country: South Africa
- Province: Western Cape
- Municipality: City of Cape Town
- Established: 1714

Area
  - Total: 21.36 km^{2} (8.25 sq mi)

Population (2011)
  - Total: 55,558
  - Density: 2,601/km^{2} (6,737/sq mi)

Racial makeup (2011)
  - Black African: 11.6%
  - Coloured: 51.1%
  - Indian/Asian: 1.0%
  - White: 34.2%
  - Other: 2.1%

First languages (2011)
  - Afrikaans: 77.2%
  - English: 14.3%
  - Xhosa: 2.2%
  - Other: 6.3%
- Time zone: UTC+2 (SAST)
- Postal code (street): 7140
- PO box: 7139
- Area code: +27 (0)21

Aerial video of Strand Beach and its well-known beachfront apartments along False Bay

Strand is a seaside suburb of the City of Cape Town, Western Cape, South Africa. It lies on the north‑eastern shore of False Bay between Somerset West and Gordon’s Bay, about 50 kilometres south‑east of central Cape Town, and forms part of the Helderberg area. The suburb is known for its long sandy beach and coastal recreation.

== Etymology and naming ==
The name “Strand” is Afrikaans for “beach”. The settlement was historically known as “Somerset Strand”; in 1937 the name was standardised to “Strand”.

== History ==
Strand developed during the 18th and 19th centuries as a fishing and holiday settlement for inland communities, particularly from the Stellenbosch district. It was proclaimed a municipality in 1897, and the town name was standardised as “Strand” in 1937. Early 20th‑century growth in the wider area was shaped by the explosives works at Paardevlei (near Somerset West), established by De Beers and later known as Cape Explosives Works before becoming part of AECI; the plant entered production in 1903 and diversified into related chemical industries during the mid‑20th century. During the apartheid era, Strand was designated a whites‑only resort under the Group Areas Act around 1970, and non‑white residents were forcibly removed. A historic Muslim community, present since the 19th century, remained centred on the Javia Mosque. Built between about 1850 and 1870 by freed slaves and free Black people, the mosque was declared a provincial heritage site in March 2026.

In 1996 the Strand municipality was dissolved and incorporated into the Helderberg metropolitan substructure within the Cape Metropolitan Council, and in December 2000 the Helderberg area was amalgamated into the unified City of Cape Town.

== Geography ==
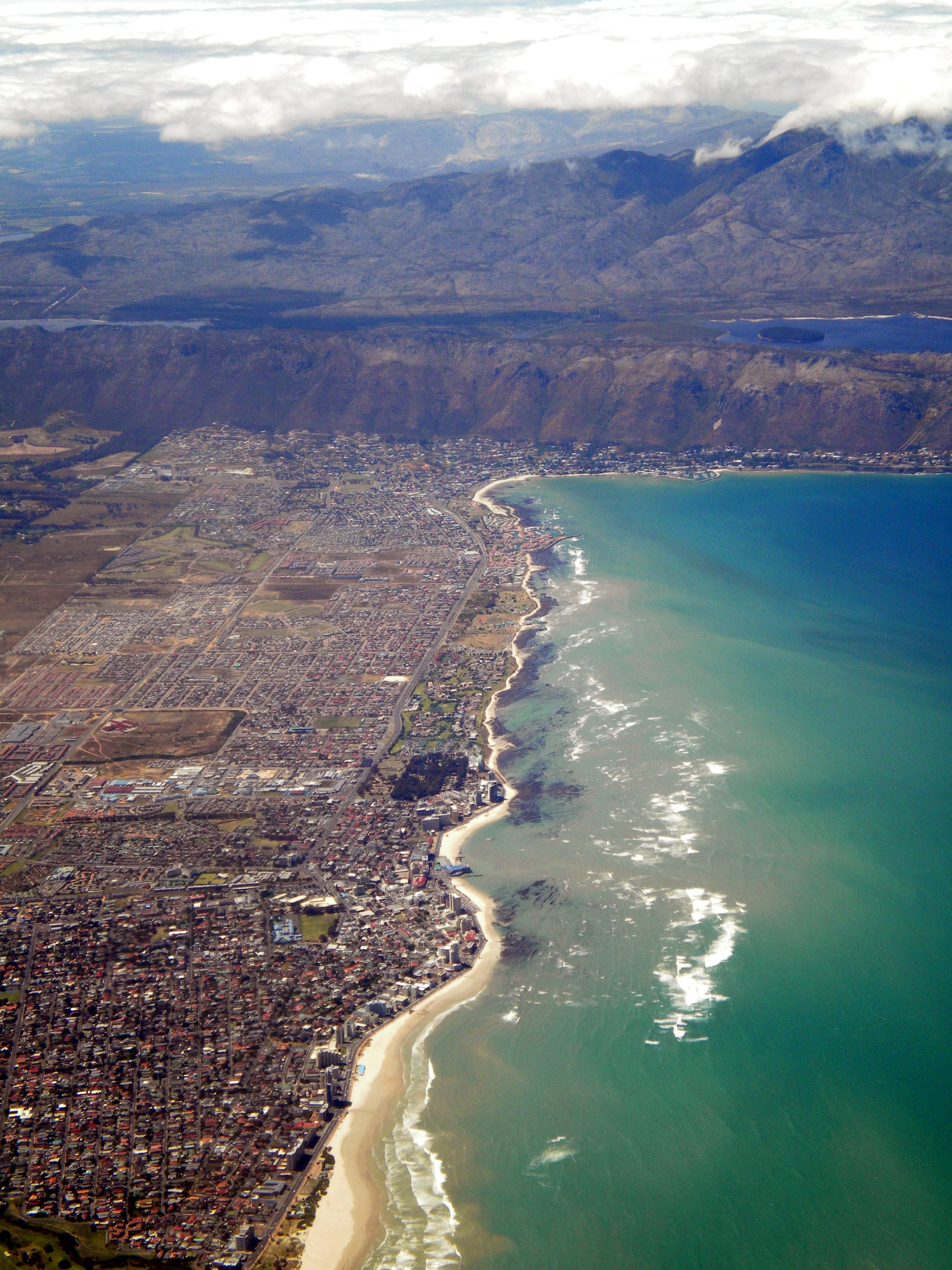
Aerial view of Strand along the shores of False Bay, with the Hottentots Holland Mountains, Steenbras Dam and the Kogelberg beyond

Strand occupies a coastal plain on the north‑eastern edge of False Bay at the foot of the Helderberg Mountains. The Lourens River reaches the ocean near Strand, shaping the local coastal environment. The suburb forms part of the Helderberg Basin alongside Somerset West and Gordon’s Bay.

Cape Town has a Mediterranean‑type climate with hot, dry summers and cool, wet winters; Strand experiences this pattern on the False Bay coast. Most rainfall occurs during the winter months.

== Demographics ==
According to the 2011 census for the main place “Strand”, the population was 55,558. The racial composition was Coloured (51.1%), White (34.2%), Black African (11.6%) and other groups, while first languages were predominantly Afrikaans (77.2%) and English (14.3%). The City of Cape Town also publishes profiles for different administrative geographies; for example, the Strand police‑precinct profile based on Census 2022 reports a population of 65,635. These figures are not directly comparable because the boundaries differ from the Statistics South Africa main place.

== Government and administration ==
Strand falls within the City of Cape Town Metropolitan Municipality and is administered within Subcouncil 8 (Helderberg), which includes Strand, Somerset West, Gordon’s Bay and surrounding areas. Strand is represented across several municipal wards, including Wards 83 and 85, both of which include voting districts within the suburb. In the 2026 local government elections, the Democratic Alliance’s Carl Punt retained Ward 83 with 81.9% of the ward vote, while the African National Congress’s Sitembile Sydney Mfecane won Ward 85 with 37.2%, ahead of the Democratic Alliance on 34.5%.

== Economy ==
Strand’s economy is centred on retail and services supporting its residential population, with tourism focused on the beachfront and historic Strand Pavilion precinct. Its central business district is an established commercial area, with banks, shopping centres and other businesses. Strand Square is one of the shopping centres in the CBD.

Strand Main Road contains a mix of retail and other commercial premises. The Gants area, alongside the N2, is an established industrial and commercial node. It includes Gants Centre and Gants Plaza, with businesses operating in light industry, retail, warehousing and offices.

The Strand Business Improvement District (SBID), formally established in 2014, provides supplementary public-safety, cleaning and urban-maintenance services in a defined area of the central business district.

The nearby Paardevlei precinct in Somerset West, formerly associated with the Cape Explosives Works and the AECI industrial complex, played an important role in shaping the wider Helderberg economy during the 20th century. The former industrial site is undergoing a transition to mixed-use redevelopment, with plans incorporating residential, commercial and employment-generating activities. More recently, the City of Cape Town approved a lease for the development of a film studio facility on part of the Paardevlei site.

== Transport ==
Strand is connected by the N2 and R44 regional routes. Rail access is via a short branch from Van der Stel (Somerset West) to Strand, opened by the Cape Government Railways on 16 December 1905. Today, Strand serves as a terminus on Metrorail Western Cape’s Northern Line.

== Landmarks, culture and recreation ==
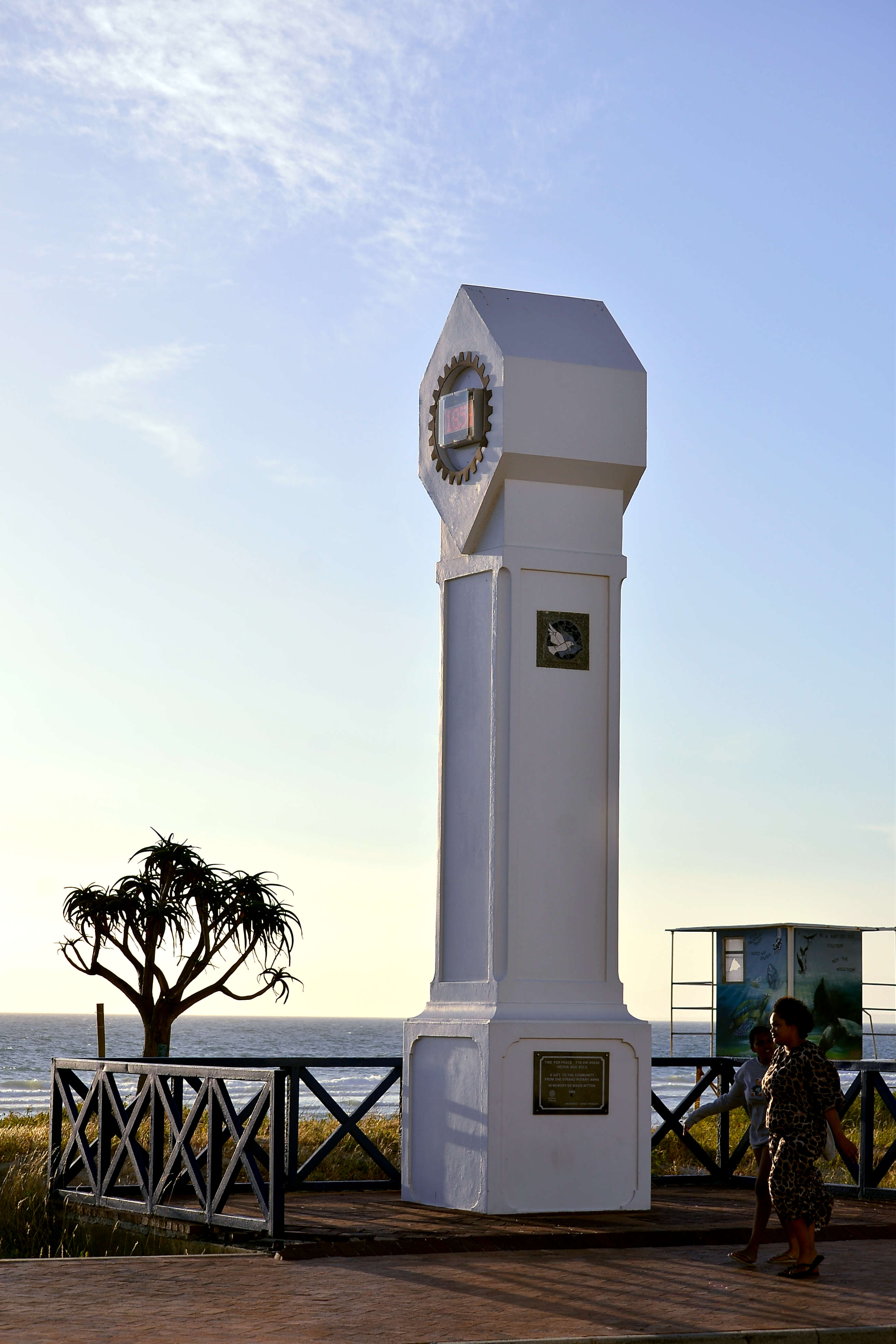
The Time for Peace clock tower on Strand beachfront, overlooking False Bay

- Strand beachfront and the Strand Pavilion precinct are focal points for recreation and tourism on False Bay.
- The Javia Mosque (Masjid Javia), the oldest surviving place of worship in Strand, was declared a provincial heritage site in 2026.
- The Lourens River mouth and False Bay coastline support beachgoing, angling and water‑based recreation.
- The Peace Clock, also known as the Time for Peace clock tower, is a Beach Road landmark erected in 1994 by the former Strand Rotary Anns. After more than a decade out of service, it was restored in 2024 with support from Golden Arrow Bus Services.
- Strand Indoor Swimming Pool on Beach Road is a heated public facility with lifeguards and accessible amenities.
- The Lwandle Migrant Labour Museum, in the adjacent suburb of Lwandle, preserves the history of the migrant labour system and hostel life under apartheid. Opened on 1 May 2000, it includes a restored hostel and guided walks.
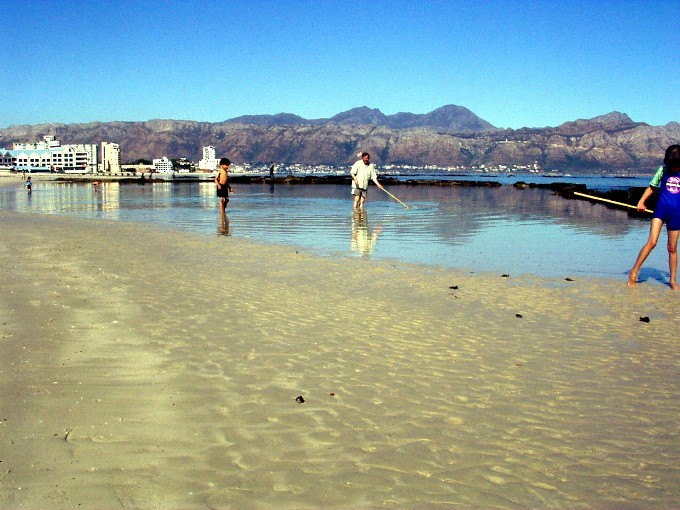
  Sandy beach with tidal pool along Beach Road in Strand, with the Strand Pavilion, Gordon’s Bay and the Hottentots Holland Mountains in the background

== Education ==
Strand is served by public and independent schools under the Western Cape Education Department (Metro East). Notable institutions include Laerskool Hendrik Louw and Laerskool Lochnerhof (primary) and Hoërskool Strand (secondary). Post‑school vocational education is provided by the Strand campus of Boland College.

== Sport ==
Helderberg Rugby Club plays its home matches at Charles Morkel Stadium in Strand.

== Neighbourhoods and surrounding areas ==
The City of Cape Town’s Official Planning Suburbs dataset defines Strand as an official planning suburb within Subcouncil 8. Because earlier lists often used non-official boundaries, the City dataset is the authoritative reference for suburb definitions and adjacent planning suburbs in the Helderberg area.

Within or closely associated with Strand, the City recognises the following official planning suburbs and precincts: Chris Nissen Park, Goedehoop, Southfork, Strandvale, Twin Palms and Strand Industria. Adjacent official suburbs commonly linked with the Strand area include Lwandle and Nomzamo to the north-east, and Gordon’s Bay and Somerset West nearby.
