= Erica lowryensis =

Scientific classification
- Kingdom: Plantae
- Clade: Tracheophytes
- Clade: Angiosperms
- Clade: Eudicots
- Clade: Asterids
- Order: Ericales
- Family: Ericaceae
- Genus: Erica
- Species: E. lowryensis

Binomial name
- Erica lowryensis Bolus

Species of flowering plant

Erica lowryensis, the Sir Lowry's Pass heath, is a plant belonging to the genus Erica and is part of the fynbos. The species is endemic to the Western Cape and occurs from Sir Lowry's Pass to Betty's Bay. The population in the Kogelberg Nature Reserve is protected. The plant is considered rare.

== Varieties ==
The species has two varieties:

- Erica lowryensis var. glandulifera Dulfer
- Erica lowryensis var. lowryensis
