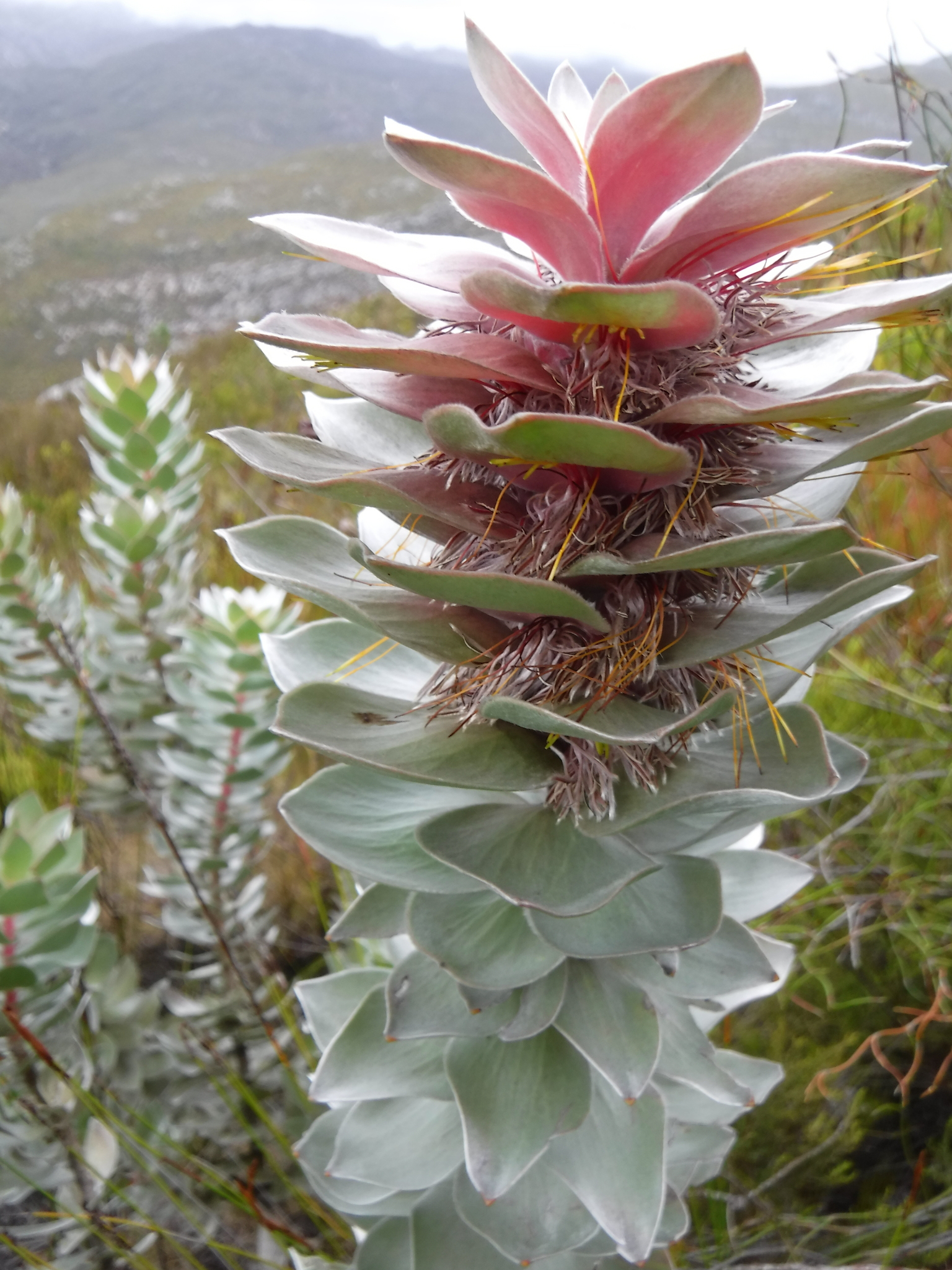

Conservation status
- Endangered (IUCN 3.1)

Scientific classification
- Kingdom: Plantae
- Clade: Tracheophytes
- Clade: Angiosperms
- Clade: Eudicots
- Order: Proteales
- Family: Proteaceae
- Genus: Mimetes
- Species: M. argenteus

Binomial name
- Mimetes argenteus Salisb. ex Knight

Synonyms
- Mimetes massonii R.Br.; Protea massonii (R.Br.) Poir.; Protea nitens Thunb.; Mimetes nitens (Thunb.) Roem. & Schult.

= Mimetes argenteus =

Species of plant endemic to South Africa

Mimetes argenteus is an evergreen, upright, hardly branching, large shrub of about 2 m (6½ ft) high in the family Proteaceae. It has elliptic, silvery leaves, due to a dense covering of silky hairs, that stand out a right angle from the branches. It has cylindric inflorescences of 8–15 cm (3–6 in) long and 10–12 cm (4–5 in) in diameter, crested by smaller silvery pink leaves at an upright angle. These consist of many flower heads, each containing six to nine individual flowers and ar set in the axil of a leaf flushed mauve to carmine. It flowers from March to June. The silver pagoda naturally occurs in the Western Cape province of South Africa. It is called silver pagoda or silver-leaved bottlebrush in English and vaalstompie in Afrikaans.

== Description ==
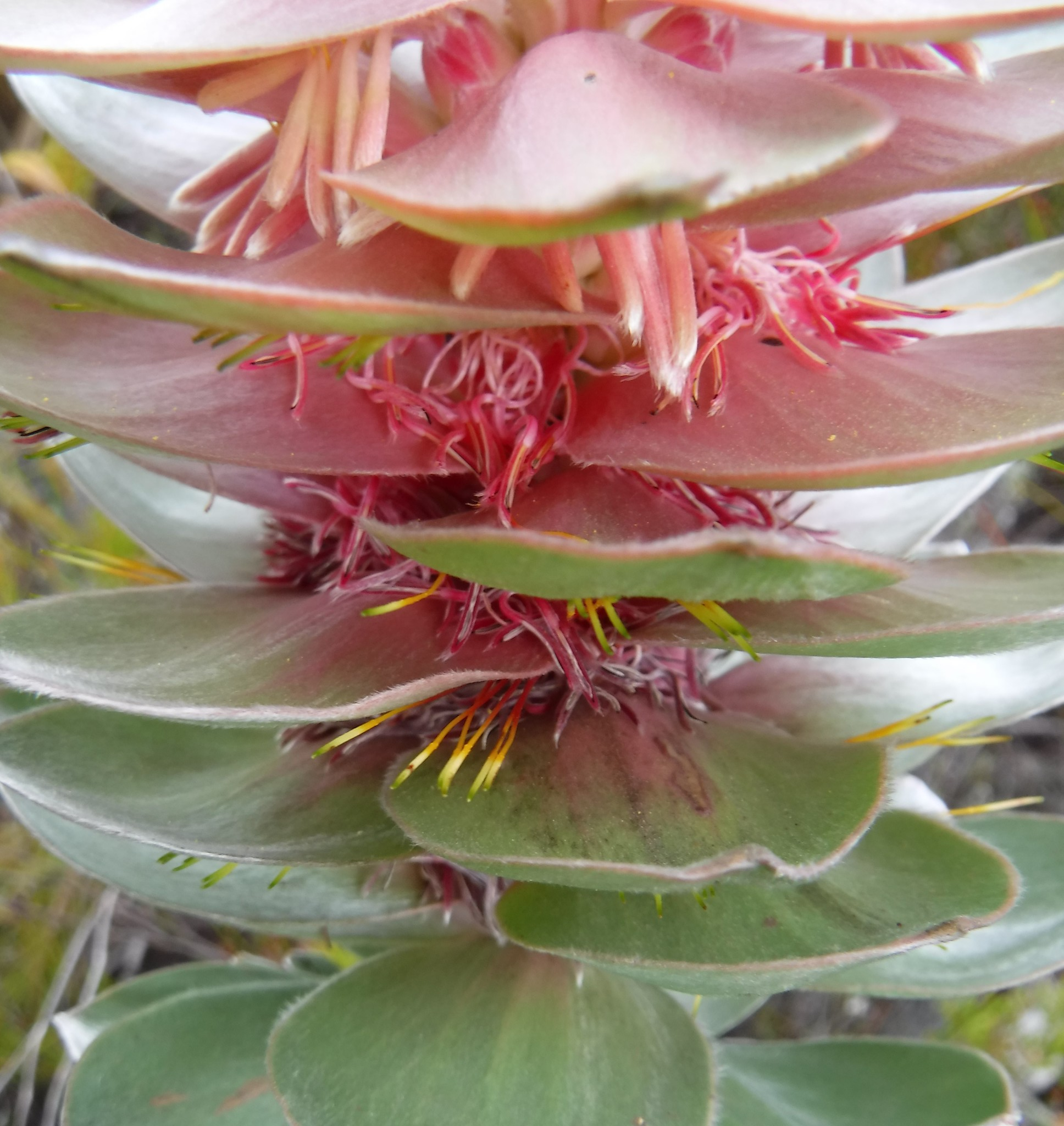
Detail showing the yellow styles

Mimetes argenteus is an evergreen, open, upright shrub, mostly of up to 2 m (6 ft), rarely 3½ m (11½ ft) high, which develops from a main stem of up to 8 cm (3 in) thick that is covered by smooth and thin, grey bark and from which shoots develop near the foot. These shoots are upright, sparsely branching, 6–10 mm (0.24–0.40 in) thick, and initially densely felty, but the hair wears off with age, reddish pink in colour near the tip. The leaves are set alternately, lack both stipules and a stalk and stand at right angles from the shoots. They have an elliptic or broadly elliptic shape, are 4–6½ cm (1.6–3.6 in) long and 1¾–3½ cm (0.7-1.4 in) wide, silvery greyish white because of a very dense covering of fine silky hair pressed to the leaf surface, and silky hairs along the edge. They have a pointy tip ending in a thickening, or seldom three crowded teeth.

The inflorescence is broadly cylinder-shaped, 8–15 cm (3–6 in) long and 10–12 cm (4–5 in) in diameter, crested by smaller silvery pink leaves at an upright angle. These consist of many flower heads, each containing six to nine individual flowers and are set in the axil of an ordinary, flat leaf flushed mauve to carmine, particularly at its base. The outer whorl of bracts that tidely envelop the flower heads, are initially cartilaginous in consistency, becoming woody with age, carmine in colour, bluntly oval in shape, ¾–1½ cm (0.3–0.6 in) long and ½–¾ mm (0.2–0.3 in) wide, with a powdery outer surface a row of minute hairs along the edge. The bracts on the inside of the head are narrow, 1–1¼ cm (0.4–0.5 in) long and about ¼ cm (0.1 in) wide, and densely set with silky hairs.

The bract subtending the individual flower is pointy line-shaped, ¾–1 cm (0.3–0.4 in) long and about 1 mm (0.04 in) wide, and covered in dense silky hairs. The 4-merous perianth is 2½–3 cm (1.0–1.2 in) long. The lower part, that remains merged when the flower is open, is very short, hairless and slightly inflated. The four segments in the middle part (or claws), are line-shaped and densely silky hairy. The segments in the upper part (or limbs), which enclosed the pollen presenter in the bud, are line-shaped with a pointy tip, carry some silky hairs and are about 1 cm (0.4 in). From the centre of the perianth emerges a yellow, straight, thread-shaped style of 4–4½ cm (1.6–1.8 in) long. The thickened part at the tip of the style called pollen presenter is line-shaped with a pointy tip, narrower where it joins with the style, with a groove that functions as the stigma across the tip, 7–8 mm (about ⅓ in) long. The egg-shaped ovary is powdery hairy, and about 2 mm (0.04–0.08 in) long and is subtended by four line- to awl-shaped scales. This develops into an egg-shaped fruit with a fleshy, whitish, oily covering, eventually about ¾ cm long and ½ cm across.

== Taxonomy ==
The silver pagoda was already collected by early plant hunters such as James Niven and Francis Masson, and was first described by in 1809 by the English botanist Richard Anthony Salisbury in a book by Joseph Knight published a book titled On the cultivation of the plants belonging to the natural order of Proteeae, and named it Mimetes argenteus. It is assumed that Salisbury had seen a draft of a paper called On the natural order of plants called Proteaceae that Robert Brown was to publish in 1810, who called the species M. massonii. Carl Thunberg described another specimen in 1813, giving the name Protea nitens. Jean Louis Marie Poiret in 1816 who also preferred a wider circumscription of the genera in the Proteaceae, reassigned Brown's specimen, naming it Protea massonii. Johann Jacob Roemer and Josef August Schultes in 1818 considered that nitens might better be assigned to Mimetes. In 1984, John Patrick Rourke considered all these names synonymous.

The species name argenteus is a Latin word meaning "silver" or "silvery".

== Distribution, habitat and ecology ==
The silver pagoda can be found between the proximity of Sir Lowry's Pass in the west, along the cool, south-facing slopes of the southern mountains, particularly the Hottentots Holland and Riviersonderend Mountains, and Appelskraal in the east. It grows in a vegetation type called sandstone fynbos, at an altitude of 600–1000 m (1950–3250 ft), rarely up to 1500 m (4900 ft), within which it prefers seepage zones on well-drained peaty soil. The flowers are pollinated by birds. After 2–6 months, the fruits are ripe and fall to the ground. Here these are collected by native ants, that take them to their underground nests. After the ants have eaten a sweet, whitish covering of the seed called elaiosome, the seed remains safely underground, protected from fire and predation by birds and rodents. This species does not survive fire, but returns from seed.

== Conservation ==
The silver pagoda is considered an endangered species, due to the small distribution area of 83 km^{2} (32 sq mi), the small, scattered subpopulations, the declining number of specimens, lower groundwater tables caused by extraction, competition by Invasive alien plants and too frequent fires. A further threat is posed by the invasive alien Argentine ant, Linepithema humile, which may transplant the native ant species, but eats the elaiosome without carrying the seed underground, and so exposing it to seed eating mammals and birds.
