= Land-en-Zeezicht =

Land-en-Zeezicht is a neighbourhood of Somerset West, in the Western Cape, South Africa. It was originally part of the historic Vergelegen wine estate. In 1914, Hendrik Hendriksz came into possession of the area known as Land-en-Zeezicht, building his mansion on Verster Avenue. Two of his daughters, Alida and later Johanna, married Jan Hendrik Hofmeyr (Onze Jan) in that house. His family and descendants lived until 1947 and again from 1951 to 1971 on the farm. Gradually, the farm area urbanized. The Polish Zamoyski counts began restoring the mansion in 1981, and in 1985, the mansion was declared a historical site, SAHRA file 9/2/083/0018
