= Somerset West =

Town in the Western Cape, South Africa

Somerset West Somerset-Wes
- Town
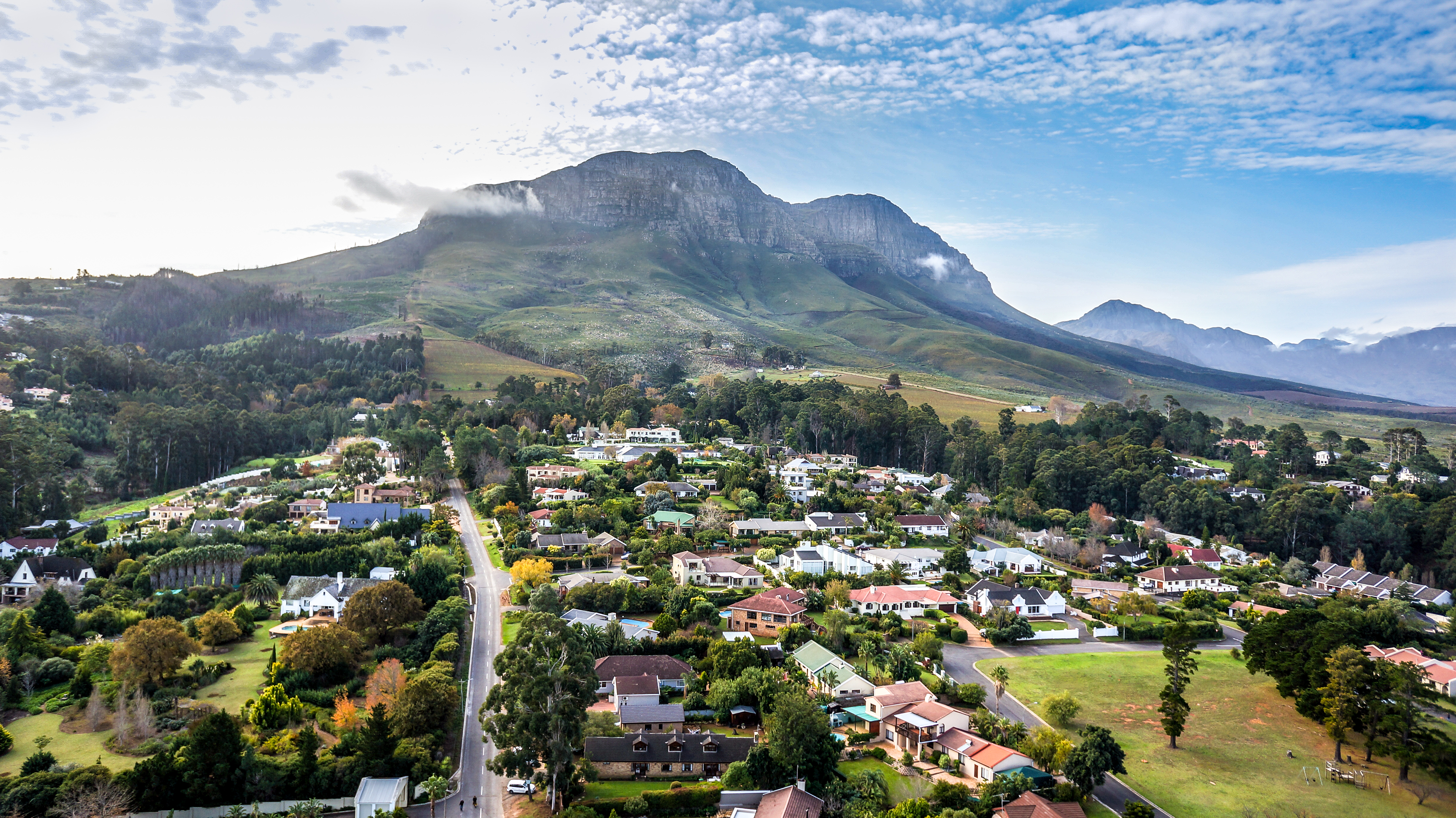
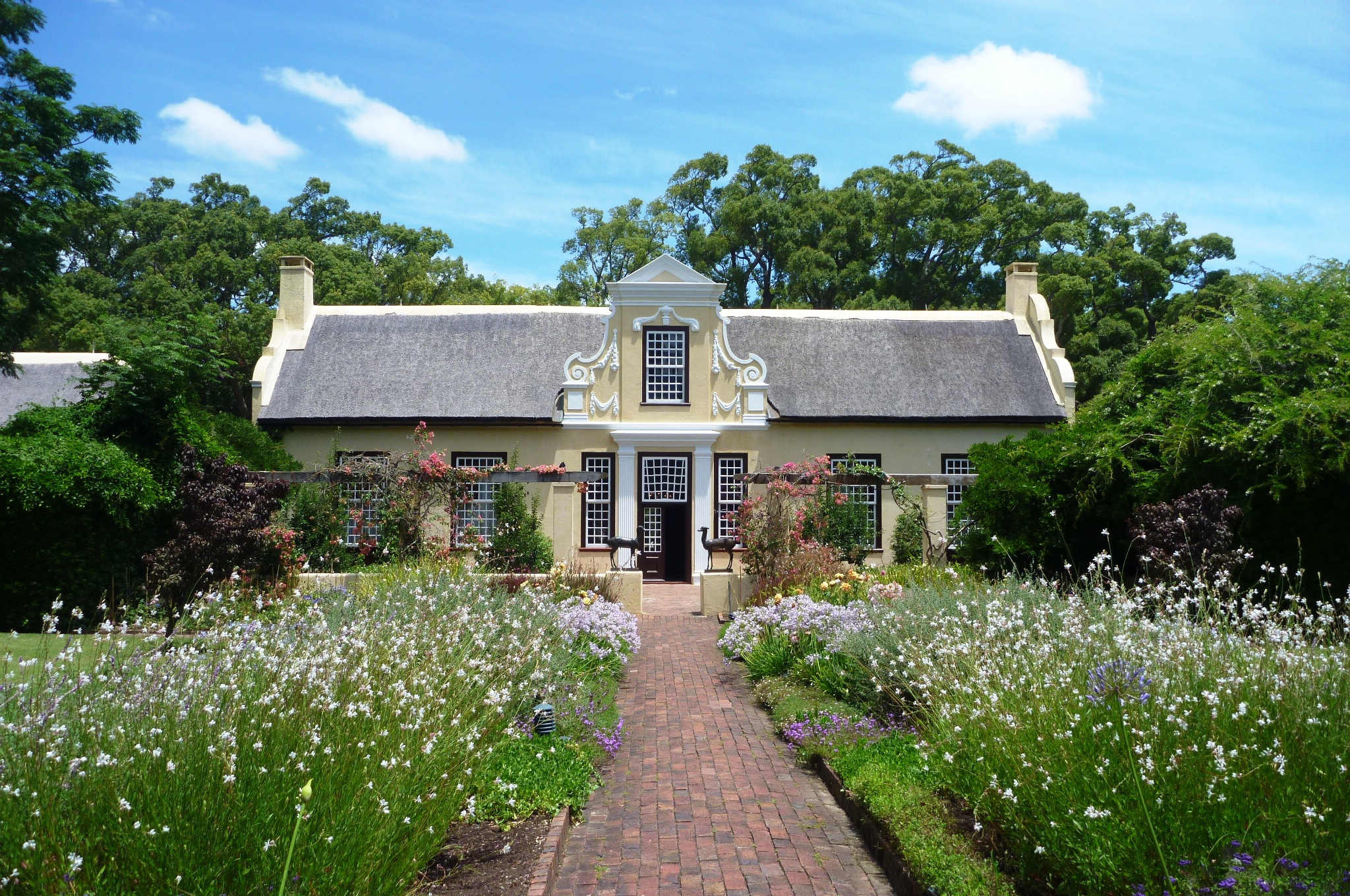
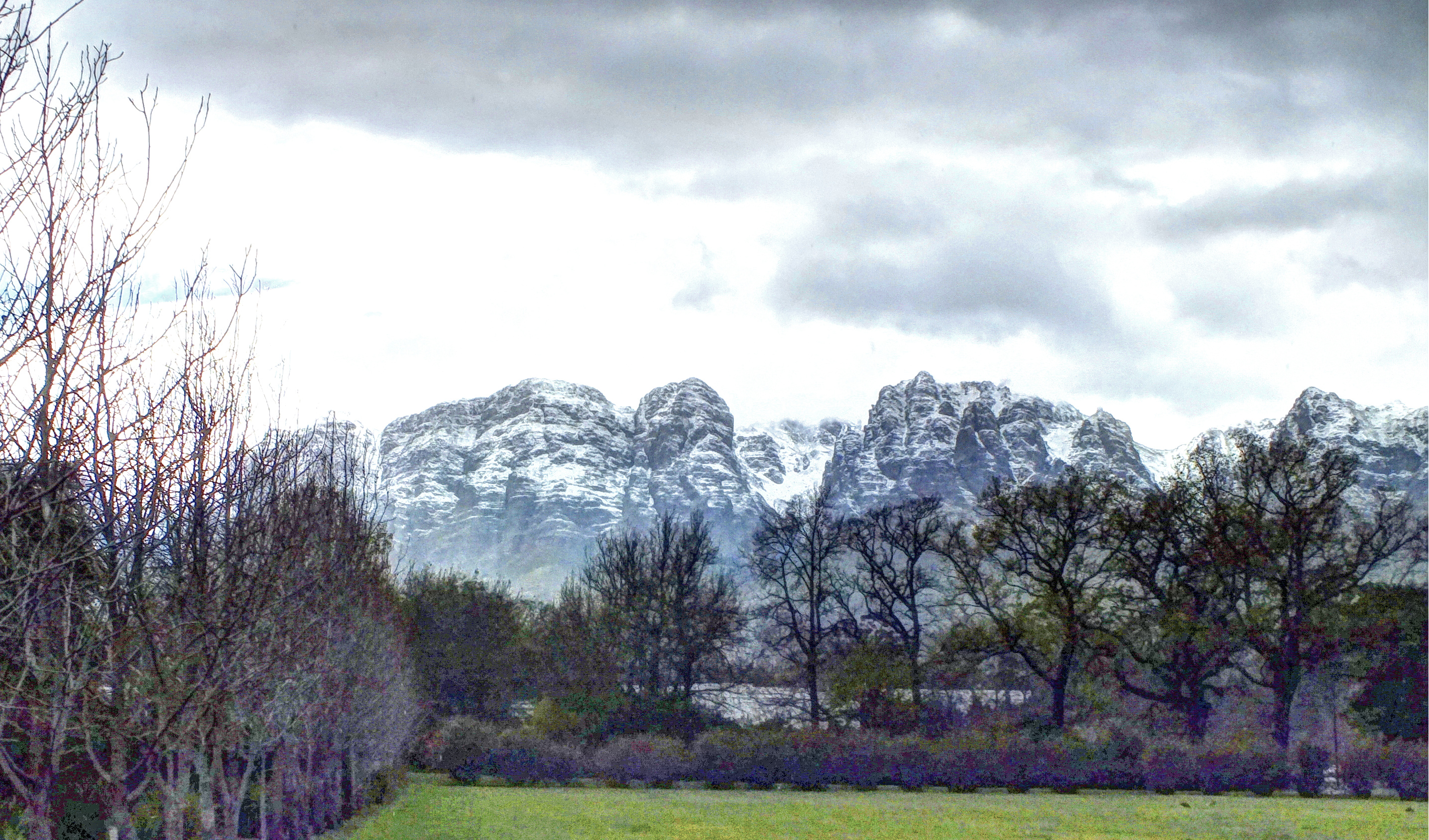
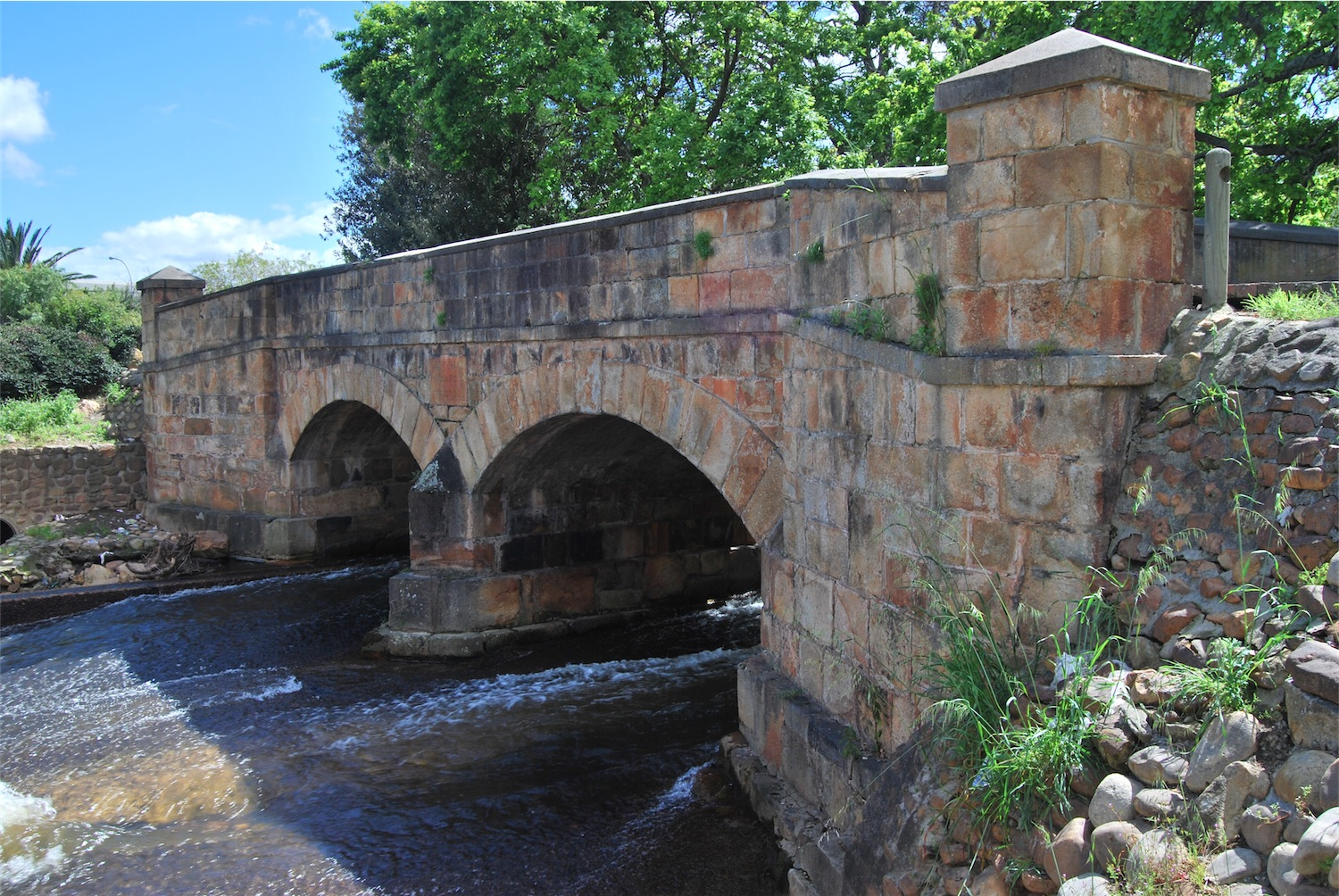
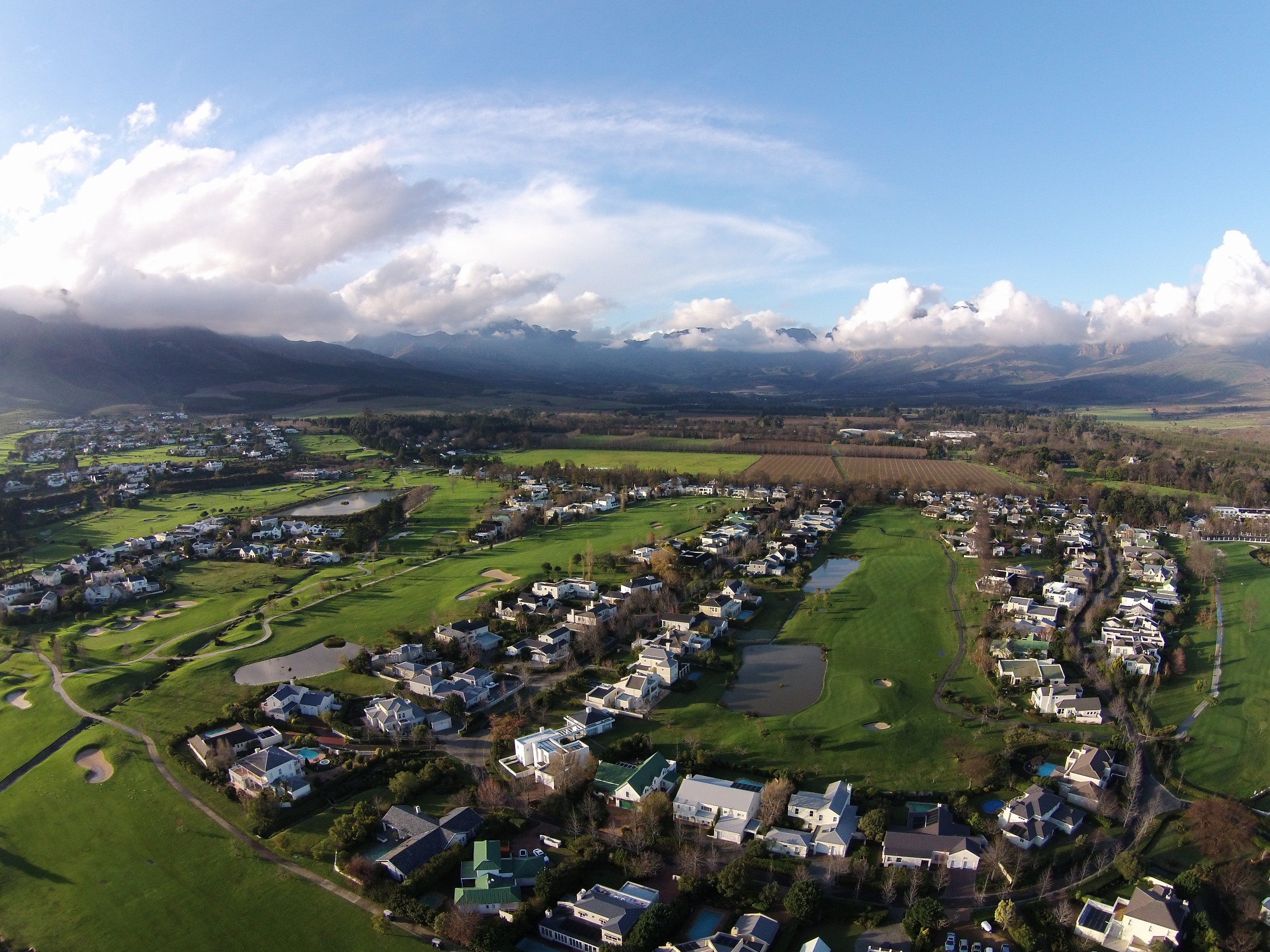
- From top: Aerial view of Somerset West with Helderberg Mountain; left: Vergelegen Estate; during the winter; Left: The Old Lourens River Bridge is a provincial heritage site; Right: Erinvale Estate.

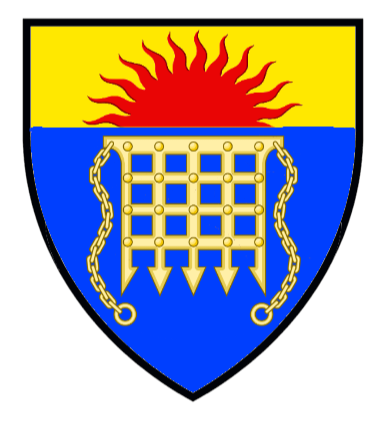
- Coat of arms
- Motto: Prorsum Sursum (Latin: Straight Up)
- Location within Western Cape Location within South Africa Location within Africa
- Coordinates: 34°05′S 18°51′E
- Country: South Africa
- Province: Western Cape
- Municipality: City of Cape Town
- Established: 1822

Government
  - Councillors: Gregory Peck (DA) (Ward 15); Norman McFarlane (DA) (Ward 84)

Area
  - Total: 61.37 km^{2} (23.70 sq mi)

Population (2011)
  - Total: 55,166
  - Density: 898.9/km^{2} (2,328/sq mi)

Racial makeup (2011)
  - Black African: 13.0%
  - Coloured: 24.5%
  - Indian/Asian: 0.9%
  - White: 60.1%
  - Other: 1.6%

First languages (2011)
  - Afrikaans: 52.3%
  - English: 37.5%
  - Xhosa: 4.8%
  - Other: 5.3%
- Time zone: UTC+2 (SAST)
- Postal code (street): 7130
- PO box: 7129
- Area code: +27 (0)21

Somerset West (Afrikaans: Somerset-Wes) is a town in the Western Cape, South Africa. Organisationally and administratively it is included in the City of Cape Town metropolitan municipality Eastern sub-region (formerly called Helderberg Basin). The vehicle registration code for Somerset West is CFM and the post code is 7130 for street addresses, and 7129 for post office boxes.

== History ==
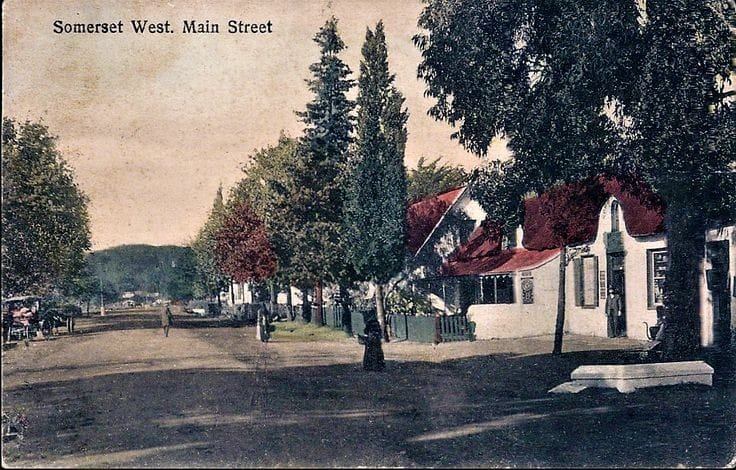
Main Road Somerset West in 1909.

A cattle post was established here by Dutch soldiers in 1672.

A town developed around the Lourens River (originally "Tweederivier", which means "Second River"; "Eersterivier", meaning "First River" passes through Stellenbosch, some 16 km (9.9 mi) to the north) and the farm of Vergelegen (Dutch: "remotely situated"), an 18th-century farmhouse built in the historic Cape Dutch style by Willem Adriaan van der Stel, governor of the Cape and son of Simon van der Stel, who gave his name to the nearby town of Stellenbosch.

Willem Adriaan was later sent back to Holland after being charged with corruption and cruelty towards local Dutch farmers. His farm was sold and divided into four separate farms: Vergelegen, Lourensford, Morgenster and Cloetenburg. Vergelegen itself is now owned by a subsidiary of the large mining company Anglo American, who have restored the farmhouse to its original magnificence and continue to produce some of South Africa's best wines there. The farm is open to tourists.

Somerset West was founded in 1822 on part of the historic farm, Vergelegen. The town was named Somerset after a British governor of the Cape Colony during the 1800s, Lord Charles Somerset, with the suffix 'West' being added after 1825 to differentiate it from Somerset East, another South African town in the Eastern Cape, which was renamed KwaNojoli in 2023. In the 1830s, Sir Lowry's Pass, named after later governor Sir Lowry Cole, was constructed to link the town with outposts further east over the Hottentots-Holland mountains.

In the 1960s, the AECI factory between Somerset West and Strand was the second largest dynamite factory in the world.

== Geography ==
Somerset West is located on the N2 about 45 kilometres (30 mi) east of Cape Town and 20 kilometres (10 mi) kilometres south of Stellenbosch. The town borders Strand and Gordon's Bay and is overlooked by the Helderberg Mountain (meaning "clear mountain"), a part of the Hottentots-Holland range of mountains. The Hottentots-Holland mountains surround Somerset West in an amphitheatre shape.

=== Suburbs ===
Somerset West includes more than 65 suburbs covering a large area of 61.37 square kilometres within its administrative boundaries, extending from the satellite areas of Firgrove to the west and Sir Lowry's Pass Village to the east. Somerset West includes the following suburbs:

- Audas Estate
- Bel' Aire
- Bene
- Bergaio
- Boskloof Eco Estate
- Braeview
- Bridgebank
- Bridgewater
- Briza
- Canwick
- Carey Parks
- Cherrywood Gardens
- Chris Nissen Village
- Croydon
- Dennegeur
- Die Wingerd
- Dorhill
- Erinvale Golf Estate
- Fairview Heights
- Firgrove (incl. Firgrove Rural)
- Fraai Gelegen
- Garden Village
- Golden Acre
- Golden Hill
- Greenway Rise
- Haumannshof
- Helderberg
- Helderberg Estate
- Helderberg Rural
- Helderberg Village
- Helderrand
- Heldervue
- Helderzicht
- Helena Heights
- Heritage Mews
- Heritage Park
- Illaire
- Jacques Hill
- Jonkershoogte
- Kalamunda
- La Concorde
- La Montagne
- La Sandra
- Land en Zeezicht
- Lionviham
- Longdown Estate
- Lynn's View
- Martinville
- Montclair
- Monte Sereno
- Morningside
- Natures Valley
- Olive Grove
- Paardevlei
- Parel Vallei
- Pearl Marina
- Radloff Park
- Rome Glen
- Roundhay
- Shady Glen
- Sir Lowry's Pass Village
- Somerset Ridge
- Spanish Farm (incl. Spanish Farm Ext 1)
- Steenbras View
- Steyn's Nest
- Stuart's Hill
- The Vines
- Victoria Park
- Westridge
- Zandberg

== Retail ==
Owing to its regional status and central location, Somerset West has become the major retail hub for the Helderberg, Stellenbosch and the Overberg regions. Somerset Mall, situated alongside the N2 freeway serves as the largest shopping centre in the Helderberg region. A number of other local retail shopping centres can be found in the town's suburban areas such as Helderberg Mall, Somerset Value Centre, The Sanctuary, Waterstone Village Shopping Centre, Vergelegen Plein and Sitari Village Mall.

== Tourism ==
Somerset West offers several tourist attractions due to its position on the Hottentots-Holland mountains and between the Cape Winelands and the nearby beaches of Strand and Gordon's Bay.

=== Wine ===
Somerset West forms part of the Helderberg Wine Region which is a wine-producing sub-region of the greater Stellenbosch Wine Region. Helderberg includes wine estates such as include 96 Winery, Alto, Audacia, Annandale, Cavalli, Ernie Els, Grangehurst, Guardian Peak, Haskell, Hidden Valley, Idiom, Ken Forrester, Klein Welmoed, Le Riche, Longridge, Lourensford, Lyngrove, Miravel, Morgenster, Peter Falke, Post House, Somerbosch, Uva Mira, Vergelegen, Vergenoegd and Waterkloof.

The most popular and nearest wine estates amongst the many surrounding Somerset West are Vergelegen and Lourensford. The Vergelegen Wine Estate lies on the border of Somerset West, spanning into the Hottentots Holland Nature Reserve. The buildings on the estate constitute fine examples of Cape Dutch architecture.

The Lourensford Wine Estate which neighbours the Vergelegen Wine Estate features the Lourensford Market and a Sports car museum known as MOTOR Studio.

=== Festivals ===
Every December, the town has a display of Christmas lights erected atop the street lights of the Main Road. The Helderberg Lights Festival (aka the Strawberry Festival), a flea market and parade, normally complements these lights.

=== Nature ===
The Helderberg Nature Reserve, a 363 hectare natural wildlife preserve opened in 1964, contains a wide variety of smaller fauna (small antelope, tortoises and other reptiles) and indigenous flora such as Protea and fynbos.

=== Guest houses & B&Bs ===
In recent years many guest houses and B&Bs have opened up in Somerset West, on account of its proximity and access to Cape Town (45 kilometres (28 mi) away on the N2 motorway), the beaches at the Strand and Gordon's Bay, and the Western Cape's numerous wine farms.

== Growth ==
In recent years, there has been a population boom in Somerset West with various secure or gated estates such as Sitari Country Estate, Croydon Vineyard and Olive Estates and Kelderhof Country Village being built on previously undeveloped land west of the town, gradually closing the little break isolating Somerset West from the rest of the metropolitan area. Paardevlei, south of the town, is an emerging mixed-use development comprising gated residential complexes and the Busamed Paardevlei Private Hospital.

== Education ==
The town has a range of primary and secondary educational facilities.

Primary schools

- Somerset West Primary School
- Somerset House
- Somerset College
- Somerset West Private School
- Helderberg Primary School
- De Hoop Primary
- Beaumont Primary
- International School of Helderberg
- Danie Ackerman Primary School
- Reddam House Somerset
- Newberry Montessori School
- Curro Primary School

High schools

- Hottentots Holland High School
- Parel Vallei High School
- Somerset College
- Somerset West Private School
- Helderberg High School
- International School of Helderberg
- Gordon High School
- Reddam House Somerset
- The Mayor Matthews Institution for Excellence
- Christian Kotzé
- Montgomery and Miller High School

Higher education

- Helderberg College of Higher Education

== Transport ==
=== Rail ===
Somerset West lies on the Strand Line (a branch line of the Northern Line), connecting its two railway stations: Somerset West and Van der Stel. The Strand service operated by Metrorail runs westwards to Cape Town (via Kuilsrivier and Bellville) and eastwards to Strand.

=== Roads ===
The N2 is the main route through Somerset West connecting Cape Town with Grabouw and George. The N2 W (in the direction of Cape Town) from the R102 on the outskirts of the town runs as a dual-carriage freeway while the N2 E (in the direction of George) runs as a dual-carriage at-grade road. Running north-west to Kuilsrivier, the R102 (Old Main Road) is an older section of the N2 and the old main road between Cape Town and Somerset West. The R44 (Broadway Boulevard) connects to Stellenbosch in the north and Kleinmond in the south-east (via Strand and Gordon's Bay).

The town is also intersected by four metropolitan routes connecting it to surrounding suburbs such as the M9 (Main Road; Sir Lowry's Pass Village Road) connecting to Macassar in the west and Sir Lowry's Pass Village in the east, the M149 (Victoria Street) connecting to Strand, the M153 (Main Road) connecting to Strand and the M156 (Irene Avenue; Steynsrust Road) connecting to Firgrove.

== Notable people ==
- Selborne Boome — rugby union player
- Ramsay Carelse — high jumper
- Athelstan Cornish-Bowden (1871–1942), land surveyor
- Eddie Daniels — ex-political prisoner on Robben Island
- Ben-Jason Dixon — rugby union player
- Justin Harding — golfer
- Trevor Immelman — professional golfer; winner of the 2008 Masters Tournament
- Steven Kitshoff — rugby union player
- Chris McGregor — jazz pianist, bandleader and composer
- H. V. Morton (1892–1979) — journalist and travel writer
- Ernest "Eddie" Peirce — boxer
- Handré Pollard — rugby union player
- David Ribbans — rugby union player
- Storm Roux — New Zealand international footballer

== Coats of arms ==
Municipality (1) — Somerset West was a municipality in its own right from 1904 to 1996. The council approved its first coat of arms on 23 April 1935.

Municipality (2) — In 1953, the council approved a new design, by Ivan Mitford-Barberton and H. Ellis Tomlinson. This was in response to a Cape Provincial Administration circular calling on municipalities to have their arms checked and, if necessary, re-designed to make them heraldically correct. The arms were granted by the College of Arms on 25 November 1953. They were registered at the Bureau of Heraldry in June 1994.

The arms were: Azure, a portcullis chained Or; on a chief of the last a setting sun Gules (i.e. a blue shield displaying a red setting sun on a golden stripe across the top, and a golden portcullis with chains below it). The crest was a golden demi-lion holding a vine, issuing from a red mural crown charged with three golden rings. The motto was Prorsum sursum. The design is canting: the portcullis comes from the Somerset family arms, and the setting sun denotes the west.

== Gallery ==
Somerset West
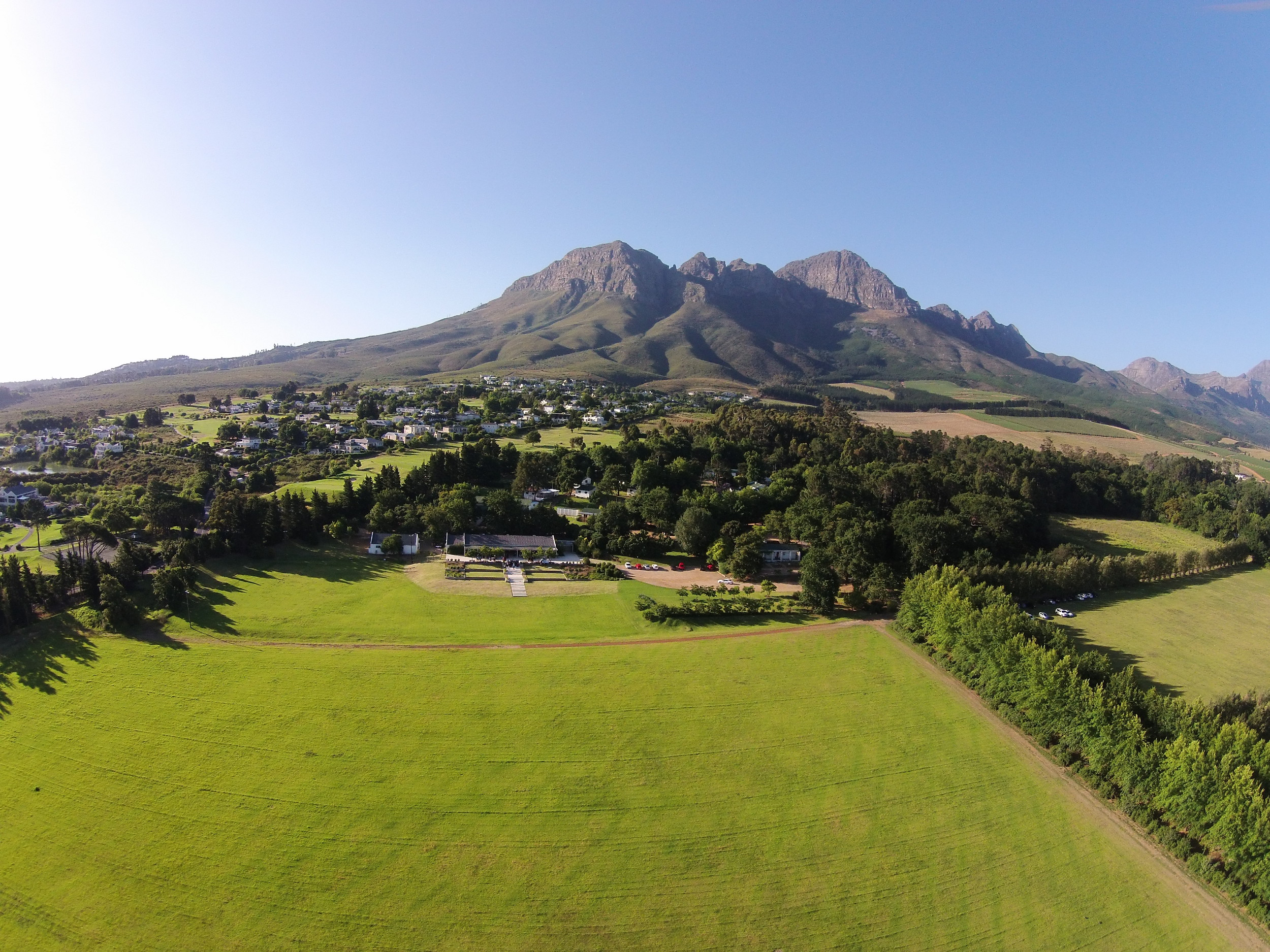
View of the Helderberg

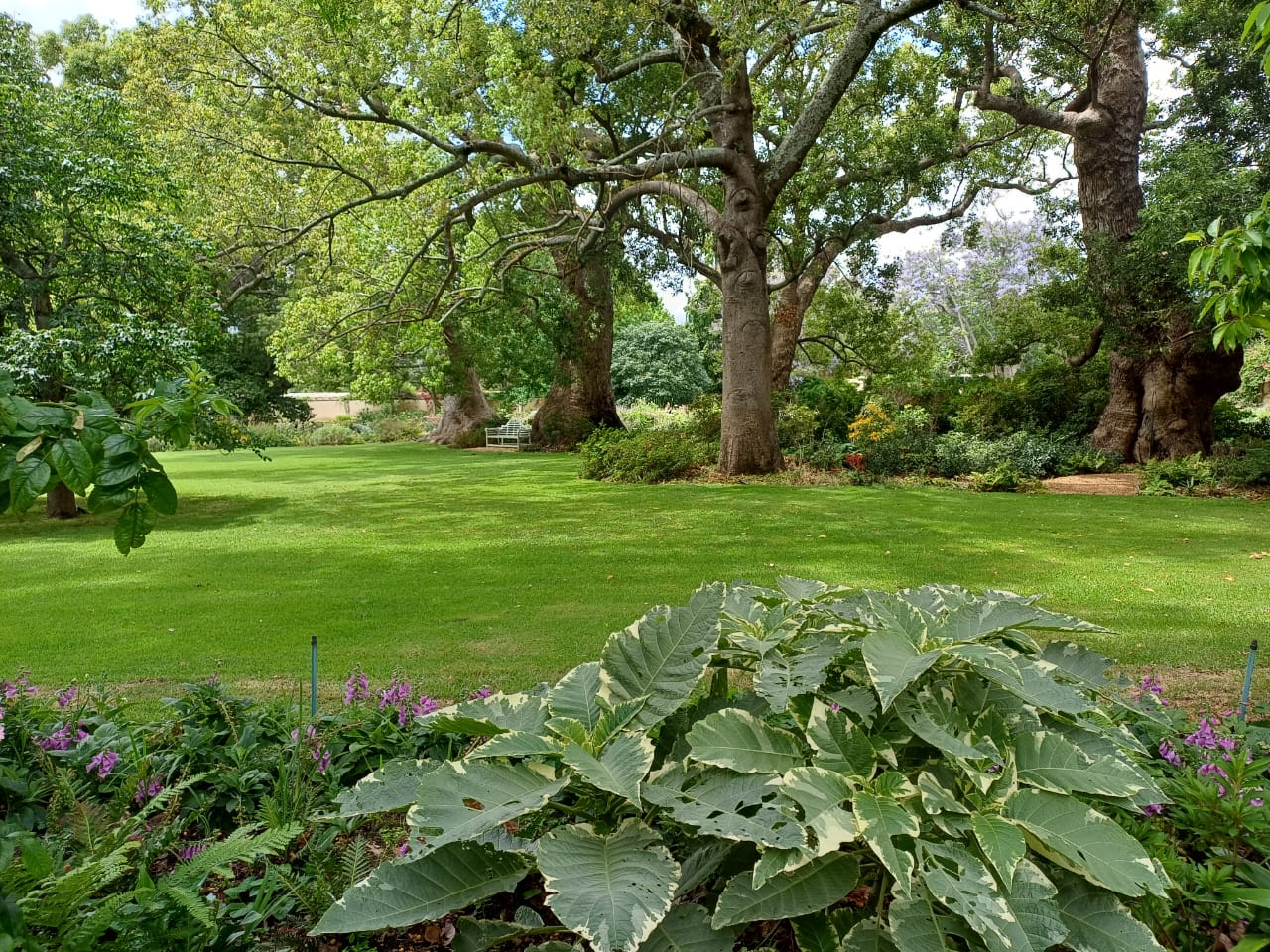
Vergelegen wine estate gardens

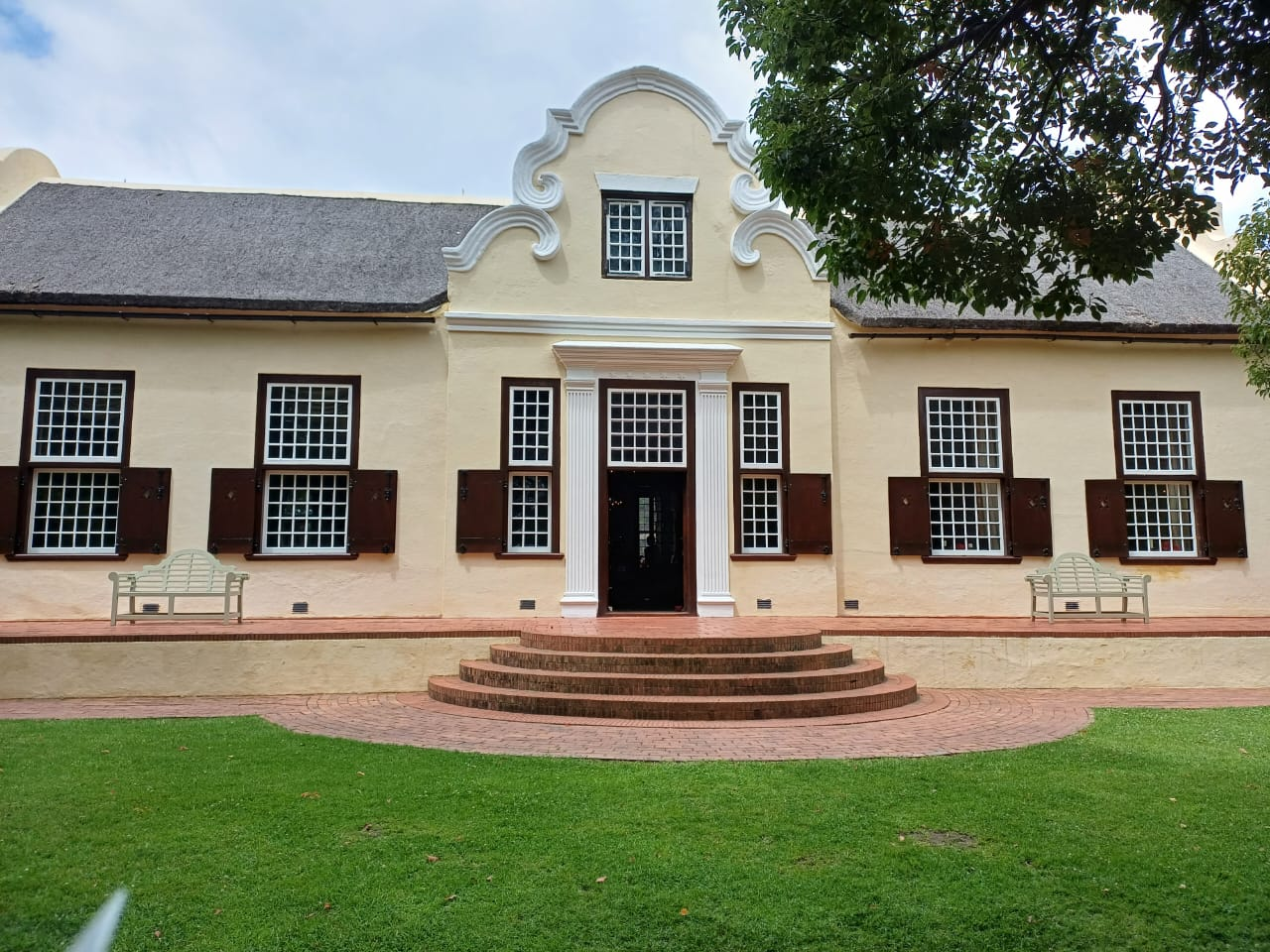
The Homestead at Vergelegen

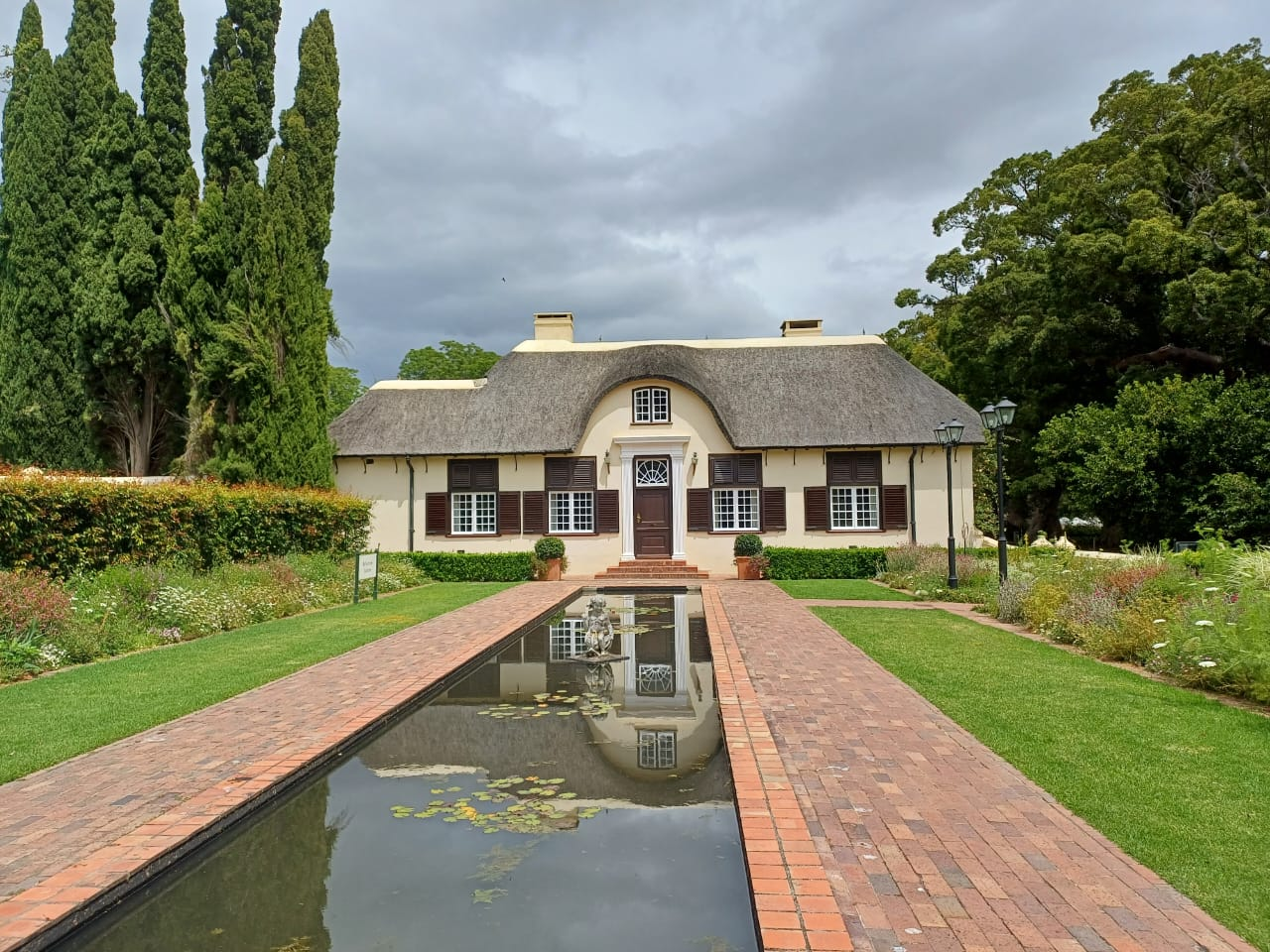
The Reflection Garden at Vergelegen

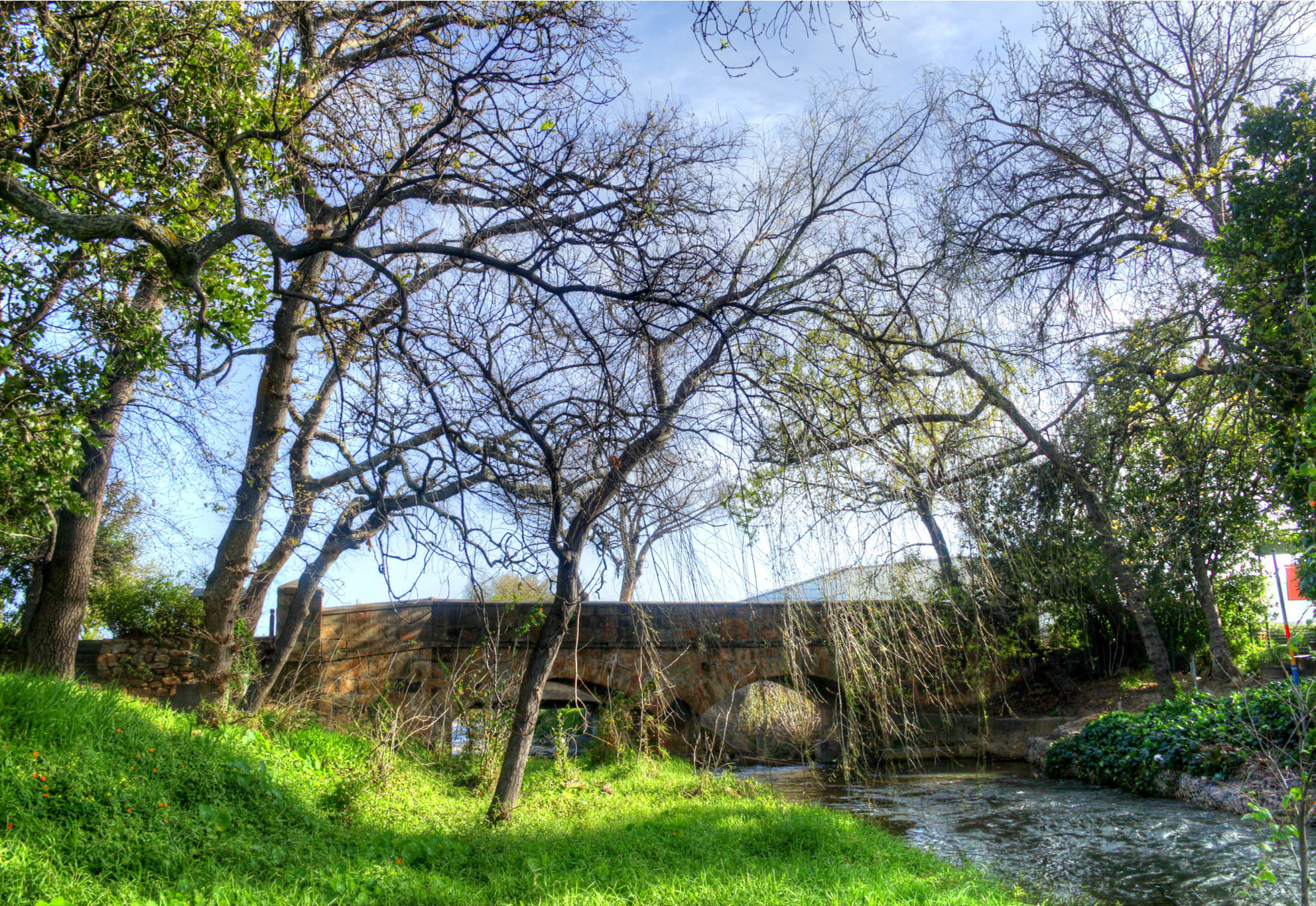
The Old Lourens River bridge

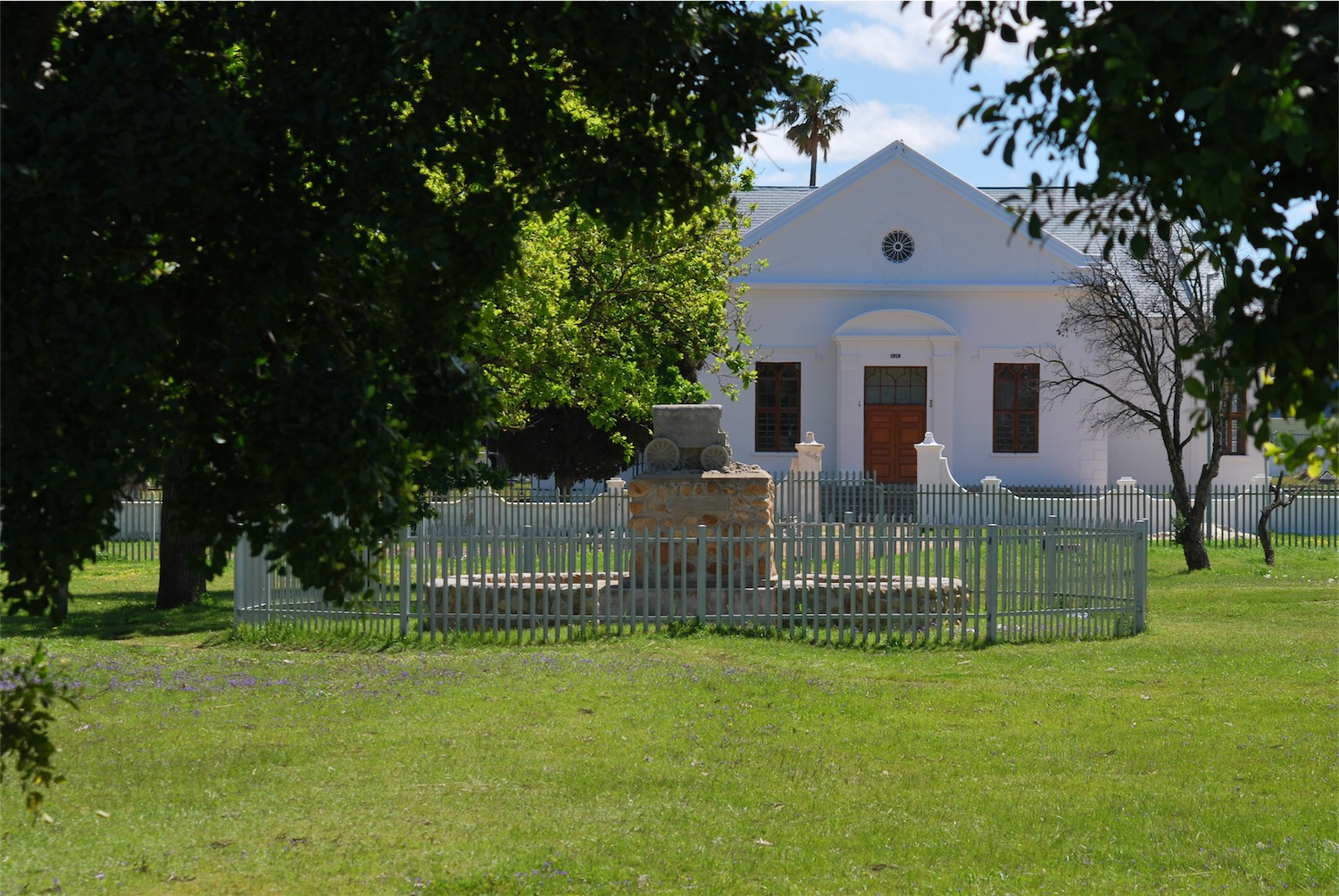
Predikant Square

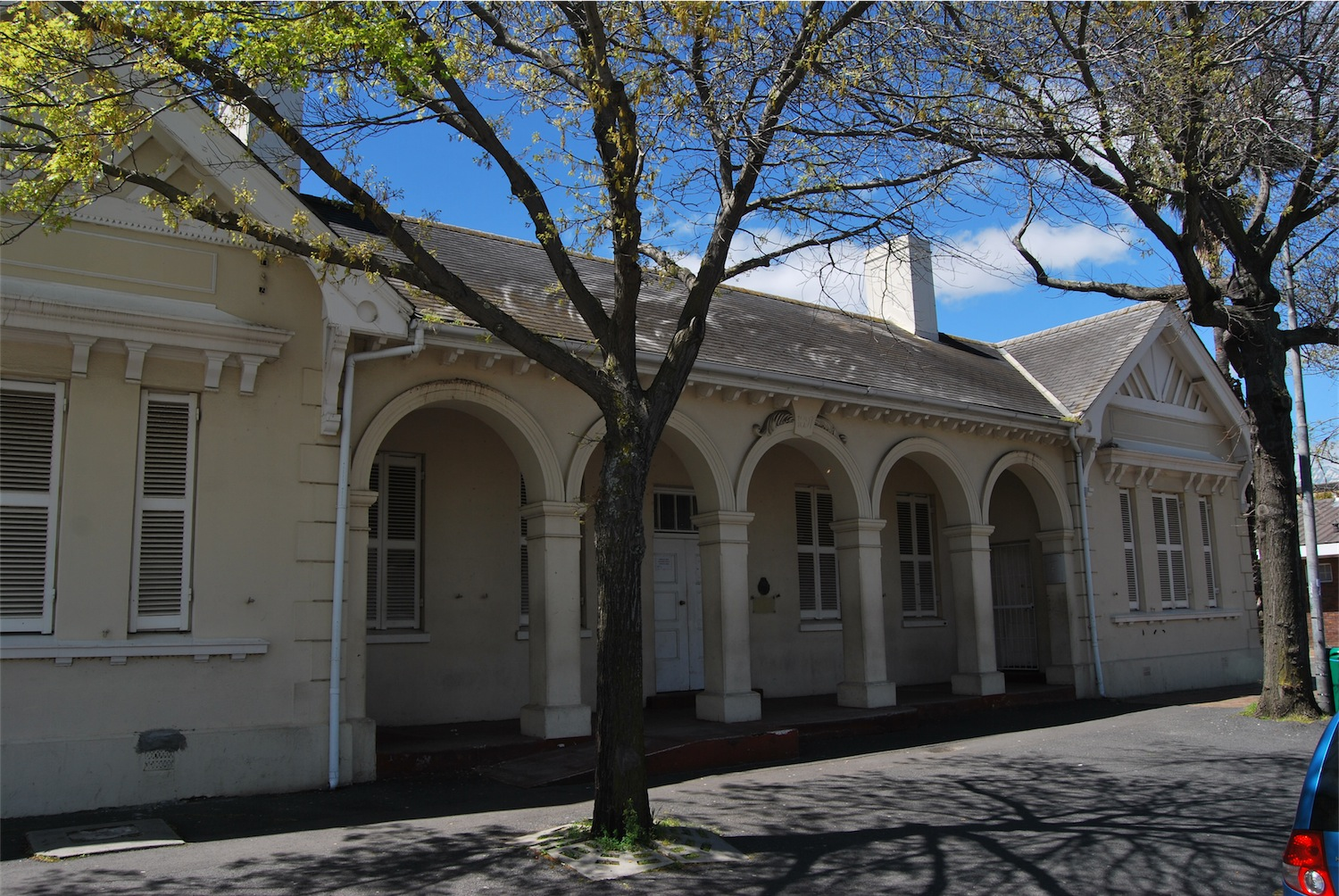
Somerset West Magistrates' Court

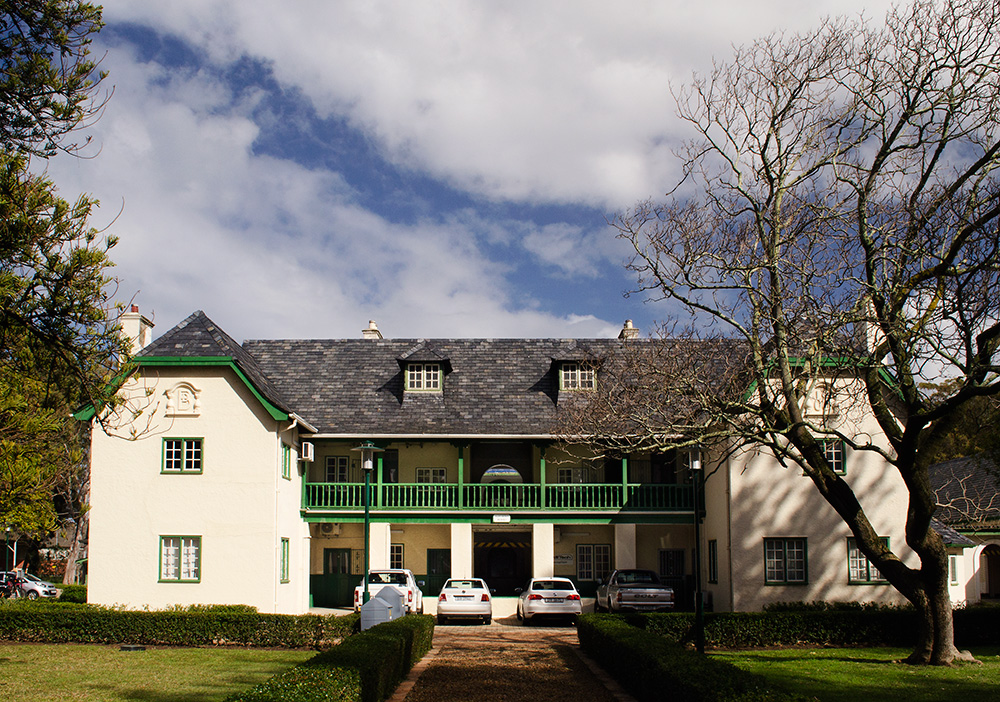
Old AECI site

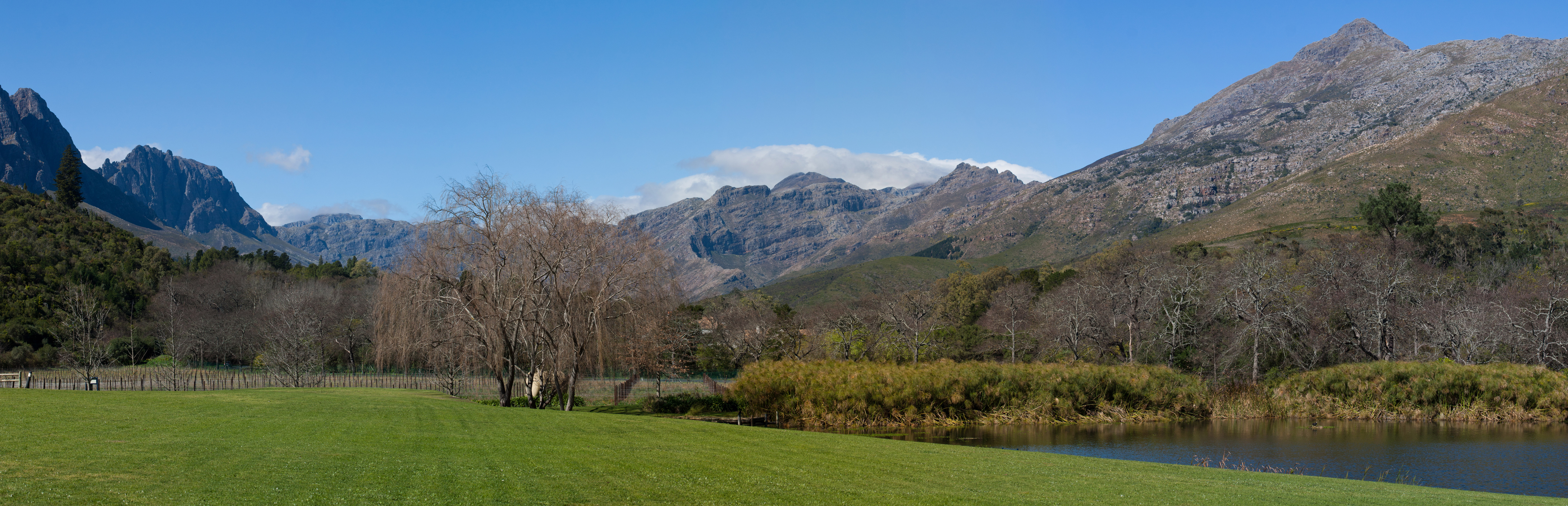
Stark-Condé Winery

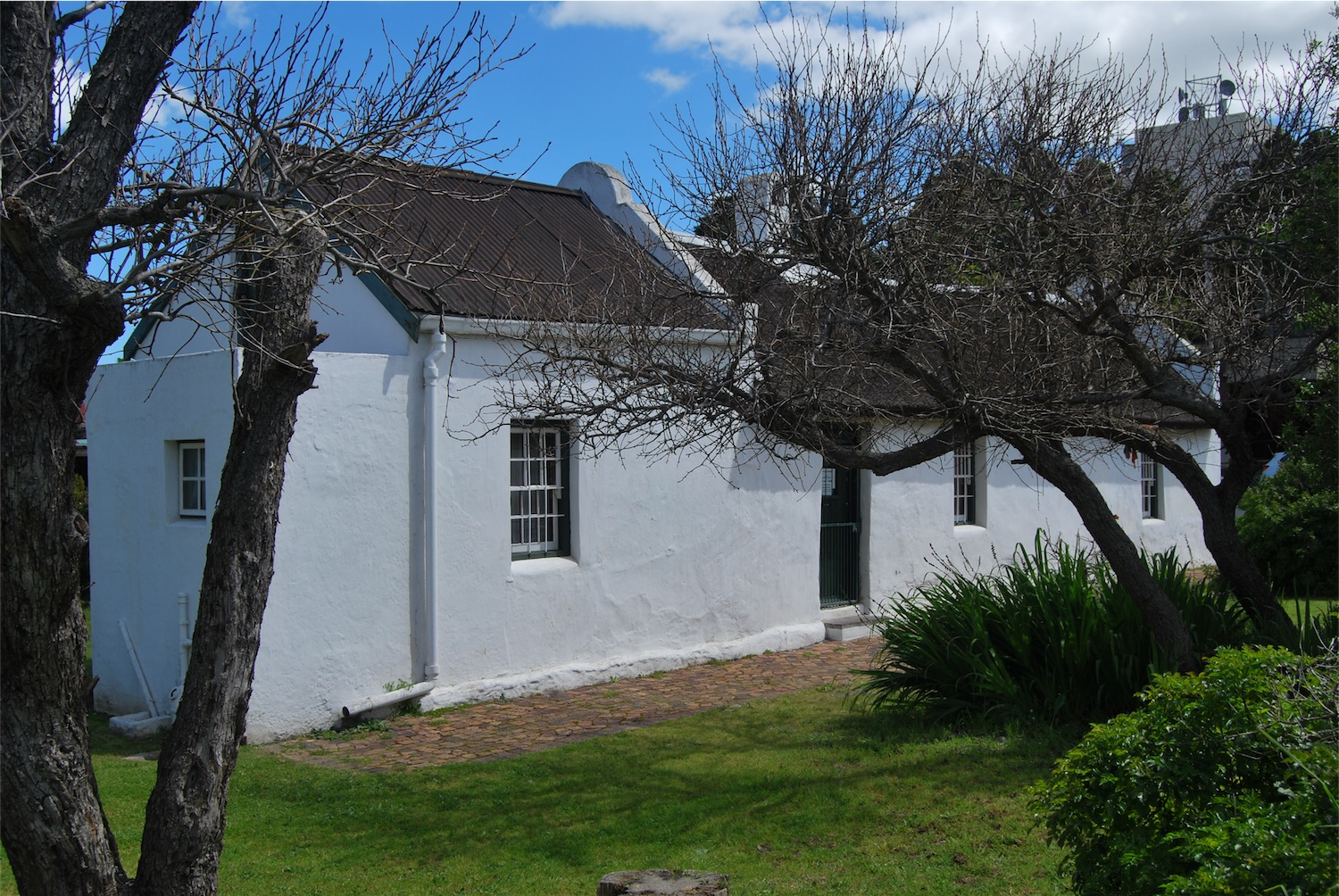
Coachman's Cottage
