= Somerset Mall (South Africa) =

Shopping mall in Western Cape, South Africa

- Interactive map of the Somerset Mall area

General information
- Status: Open (under renovation)
- Type: Shopping mall
- Location: Somerset West, South Africa
- Coordinates: 34.082619°S 18.823421°E
- Current tenants: Woolworths; Checkers; Pick n Pay, and others
- Opened: November 1993; 32 years ago
- Renovated: 2025 through 2026
- Renovation cost: R350 million
- Owner: Hyprop Investments

Height
- Roof: Flat

Technical details
- Floor count: 1
- Floor area: 69,001 m^{2} (742,720 sq ft)

Other information
- Number of stores: 206
- Parking: ~ 4,000 bays

Website
- somersetmall.co.za

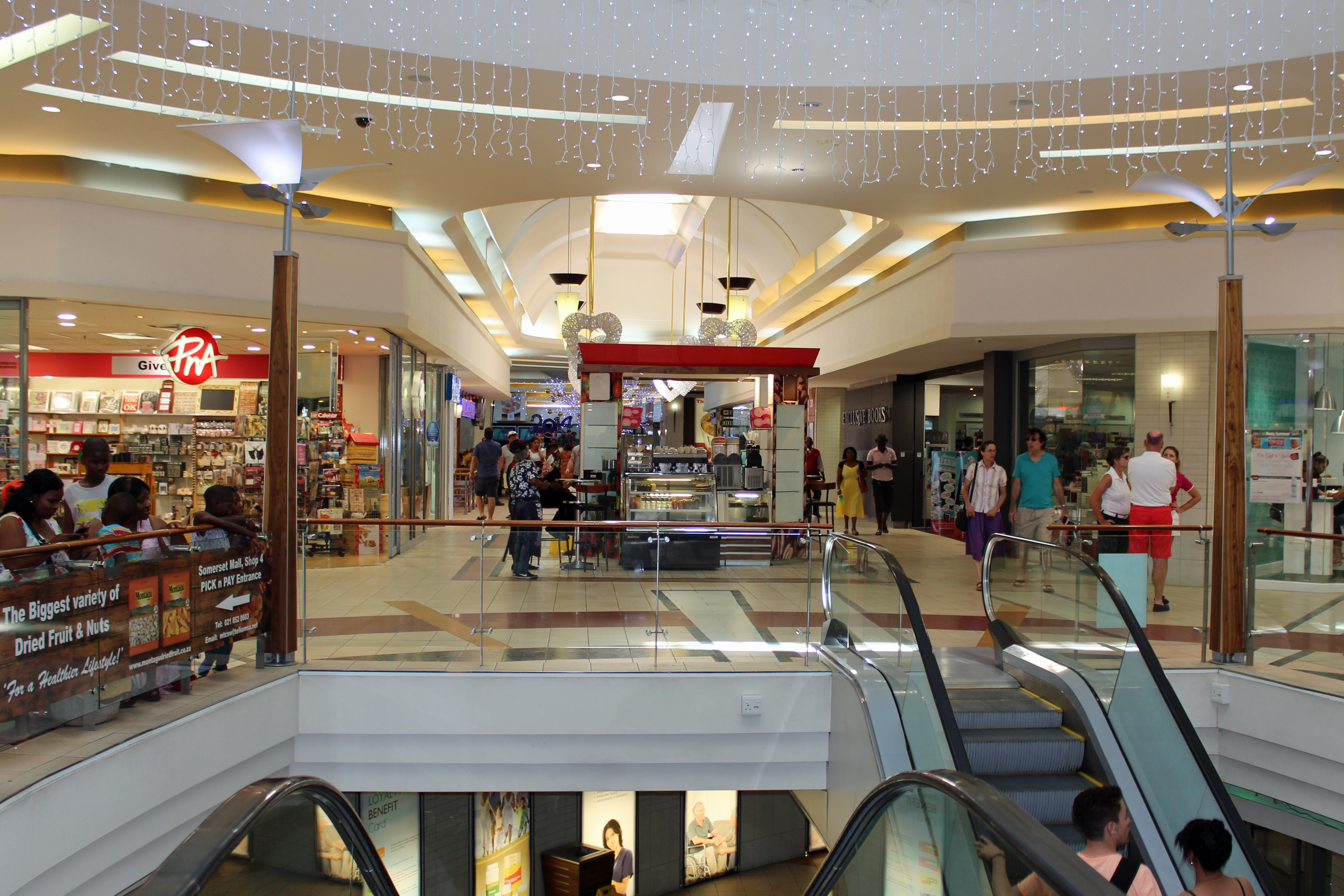
Inside Somerset Mall before the building's 2025 renovations

Somerset Mall is a 69,000 m^{2} (740,000 sq ft) shopping mall in Somerset West, Cape Town. It is a major shopping destination within the Helderberg area.

The mall is located in a mid-to-upper-income catchment area, and attracts around 10 million local and international visitors per year.

== History ==
Somerset West was opened in November 1993.

In 2025, the mall underwent major renovations, at a cost of R350 million. The revamp added 26 new stores, and approximately 5,500 sqm of retail space.

Somerset Mall's GM, Nicholas Oliphant, stated that the revamp would contribute meaningfully to local economic development. The construction during renovations supported around 1,200 jobs, and the new retail space is expected to support around 400 jobs on an ongoing basis.

The renovations brought the first Lego, Skechers, Anta Sports, Bella Luna, New Balance, Old School, Colourbox, and Bootlegger stores to the Helderberg area, as well as the first Napapijri to the Western Cape, and the first Safari Collection to South Africa.

Phase 1 of the renovations is set to open in late 2025, while Phase 2 (including entertainment area Freedom Interactive Park) will open in July 2026. An "art mile" featuring sculptures by Marco Olivier will also be added as part of the renovations.

The mall's upgrade also brought ticketless parking, extended operating hours, and EV charging.

Phase 1 of the redevelopment finished on 3 December 2025.

== Location ==
Somerset Mall is situated alongside the N2 freeway, in the southwestern part of the town of Somerset West, approximately 2.5 km from the coast, 19 km from Stellenbosch, and 44 km from Cape Town CBD.

== Operations ==
The mall comprises over 180 stores and around 4,000 parking spaces. Its anchor tenants include Woolworths, Pick n Pay, Checkers, and Game.

The mall also features Rubicon supercharging stations for EVs.

In terms of environmental sustainability, Somerset Mall uses water-saving technology and solar power.
