= Parel Vallei =

Suburb of Somerset West in the Western Cape, South Africa

- Suburb
- Location within Western Cape Location within South Africa
- Coordinates: 34.070°S 18.855°E
- Country: South Africa
- Province: Western Cape
- Municipality: City of Cape Town
- Main Place: Somerset West
- Time zone: UTC+2 (SAST)

Parel Vallei is an affluent suburb of Somerset West in the Western Cape, South Africa. There is a high school situated in the suburb known as Parel Vallei High School.

There is a section of upper Parel Vallei road that is known as Spook Hill. On this section of the road it appears as if a short section of relatively flat downhill slope is uphill slope due to the contrast with the steeper sections above and below. It is an optical illusion best viewed in front of Straightway Head Country House used to be, at the top of the Parel Vallei Road.
