= Parel Vallei High School =

Public high school in Somerset West, South Africa

Hoërskool Parel Vallei High School

Location
- South Africa; 34.0666°S 18.8574°E

Information
- Type: High School – Public
- Motto: Sapientia et Intellegentia (Wisdom and Insight)
- Established: 1986
- School district: Somerset West
- Principal: David Schenck
- Grades: 8–12
- Enrollment: 1,300
- Houses: Aberdeen Stella Nassau
- Colors: Navy and White
- Mascot: Bulldog; Winston
- Nickname: PV
- Feeder to: Stellenbosch University
- Exam Board: WCED and CIE
- Additional: Co-Ed and Dual-Medium
- Website: pvallei.co.za

Parel Vallei High School is a co-ed high school located in Parel Vallei, a suburb of Somerset West, which is in the Western Cape, South Africa.

Pupils attending the school are from the surrounding towns, such as Somerset West and Strand, as well as areas further away, such as Grabouw.

== Academics ==
The following subjects are offered by the school for the National Senior Certificate, classes are mostly bilingually tutored:

- Afrikaans Home Language
- Afrikaans First Additional Language
- English Home Language
- English First Additional Language
- German Second Additional Language (After school)
- French Second Additional Language (After School)
- Pure Mathematics
- Mathematical Literacy
- Advanced Programme Mathematics
- Advanced Programme English
- Physical Sciences
- Life Sciences
- History
- Geography
- Consumer Studies
- Hospitality Studies
- Accounting
- Business Studies
- Economics
- Computer Application Technology
- Information Technology
- Engineering Graphics and Design
- Life Orientation
- Dramatic Arts
- Visual Arts

== PV in the news ==
- Parel Vallei was in the published media regarding submissions to the school. The school had a few legal issues as it did not accept applications to the school due to size limitations. The school is currently in the process of building and extending the school. In 2004, the school was briefly in the local news after the governing body presented the idea to erect a cellphone mast on the school grounds to the community.
- In 2019 Danielle Kleyn, a learner at Parel Vallei, was crowned "Queen of Mathematics" at the 2019 Pan-African Mathematics Olympiad.
- In 2020 the school faced backlash after several social media posts alleging that one student called another student of a different race a slur. This was reported on by the media and commented on by higher-ups in the Department of Education.
- In 2021, Benjamin Kleyn received an honorable mention after participating in the National Programming Olympiad.
- In 2021, Christian Kotzé was crowned winner winner chicken dinner on the VIA TV show "Slim vang sy baas".
- In 2023, Jared Slater competed in the Pan African Mathematics Olympiad (PAMO) as part of the South African team.
- In 2025 Cameron Britz was awarded his Springbok scouts award. The highest honor one can receive in Scouts South Africa.
