= Sir Lowry's Pass Village =

Suburb of Cape Town in Western Cape, South Africa

- Location within Western Cape Location within South Africa
- Coordinates: 34°07′00″S 18°54′47″E
- Country: South Africa
- Province: Western Cape
- Municipality: City of Cape Town

Area
  - Total: 1.98 km^{2} (0.76 sq mi)

Population (2011)
  - Total: 8,496
  - Density: 4,290/km^{2} (11,100/sq mi)

Racial makeup (2011)
  - Black African: 28.2%
  - Coloured: 66.0%
  - Indian/Asian: 0.4%
  - White: 4.2%
  - Other: 1.2%

First languages (2011)
  - Afrikaans: 73.0%
  - Xhosa: 17.3%
  - English: 6.2%
  - Other: 3.5%
- Time zone: UTC+2 (SAST)

Sir Lowry's Pass Village is a town near the base of Sir Lowry's Pass, about 60 km from Cape Town, South Africa.

== History ==
In 1846 there was a post office, run by a postmistress, Mrs Walters, and six farms in the area. 43 years later the first steam train stopped there in 1890. The railway station later became the Post Office. The waiting room was also used for English Church Services in 1925, as there was no church building at the time. Wild flowers grew in profusion on the mountains and hills around the village and selling them was a major source of income for the villagers in the early 1900s. Today the little village is flanked by up-market residential estates and various wine farms, including Goederverwachting Farm, where it is reported that the Articles of Capitulation for the Battle of Blaauwberg were signed by General Janssens, the Batavian Governor of the Cape.
