= Vergelegen =

Historic wine estate in Somerset West, in the Western Cape province of South Africa

Coordinates: 34°04′37″S 18°53′31″E

- Company type: Independent wine producer
- Industry: Wine production
- Founded: 1700 (restarted in 1992)
- Founder: Willem Adriaan van der Stel
- Headquarters: Somerset West, City of Cape Town, South Africa
- Number of locations: 24 vineyards 106.71 hectares (263.7 acres)
- Products: Vergelegen V, Sauvignon Blanc Reserve
- Parent: Anglo American plc
- Website: www.vergelegen.co.za

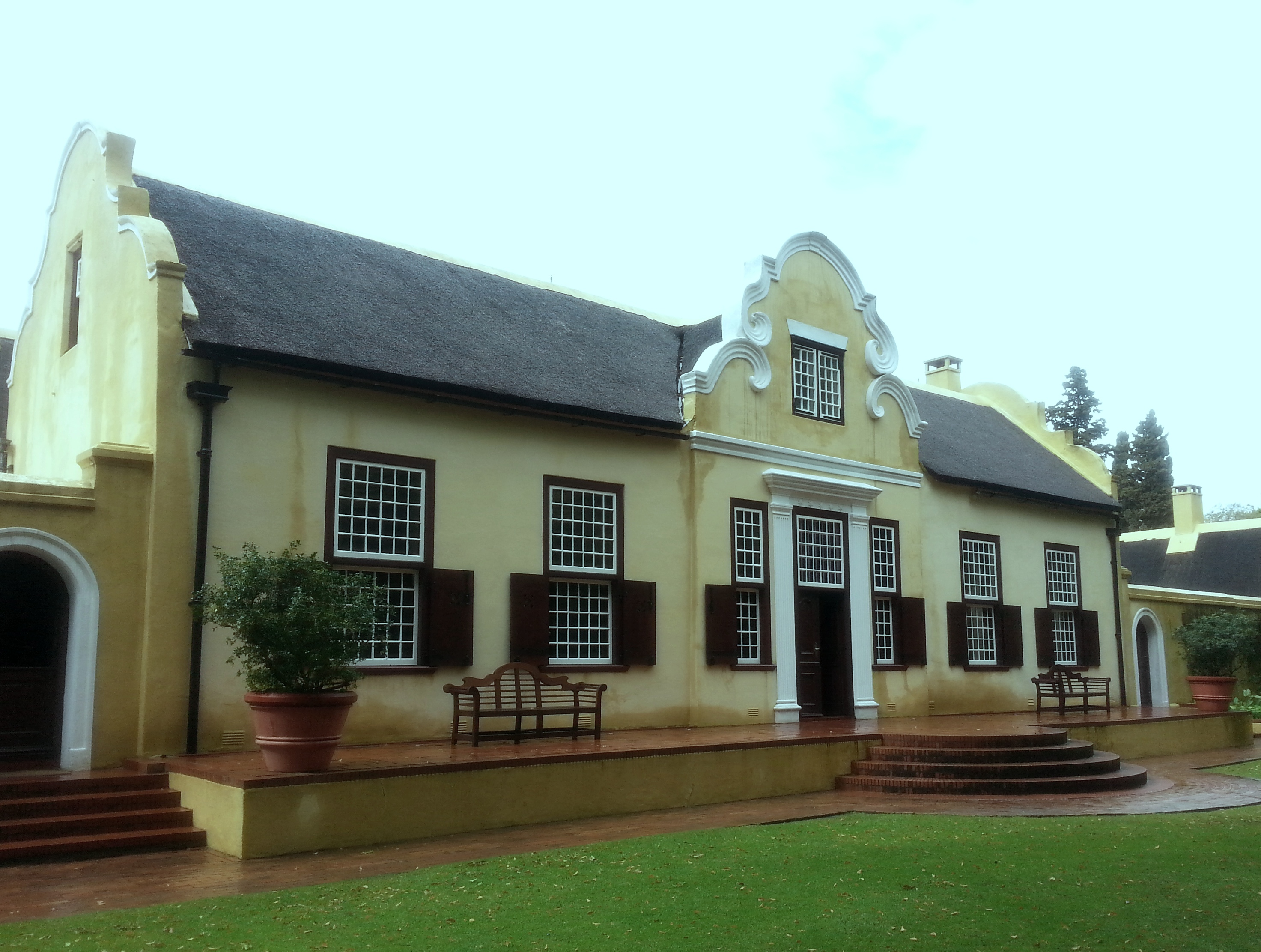
Manor house

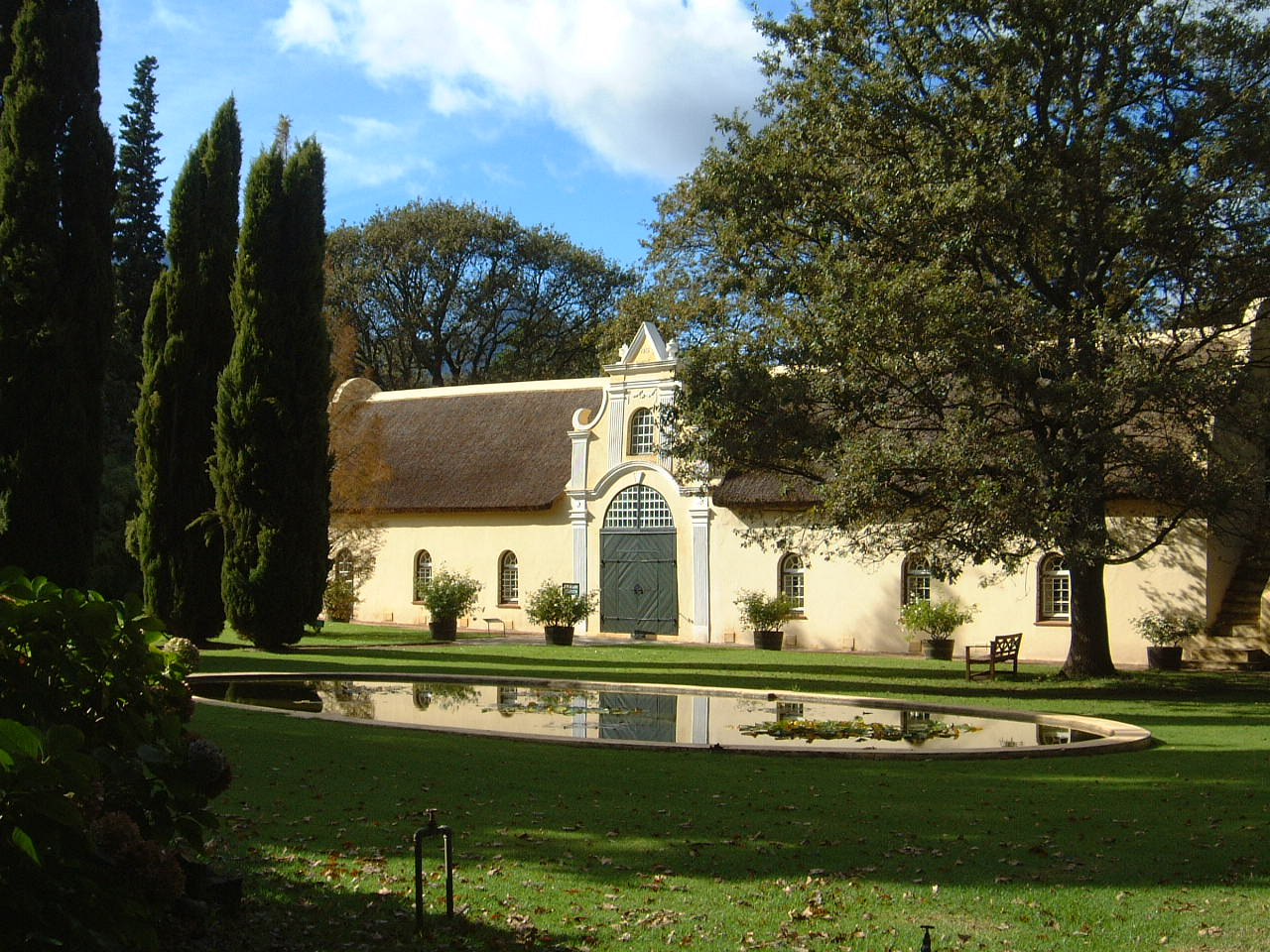
Library in the old wine cellar

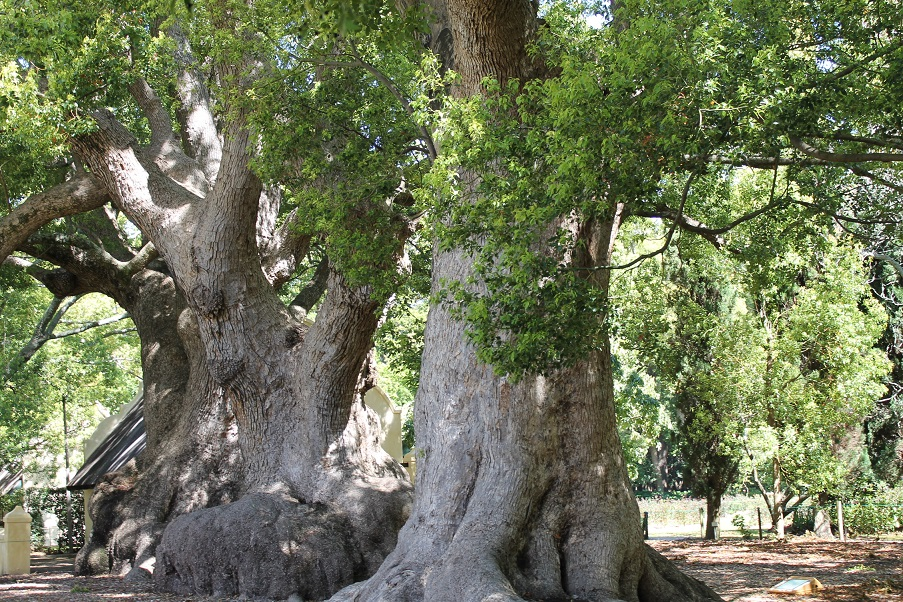
Protected historic camphor trees

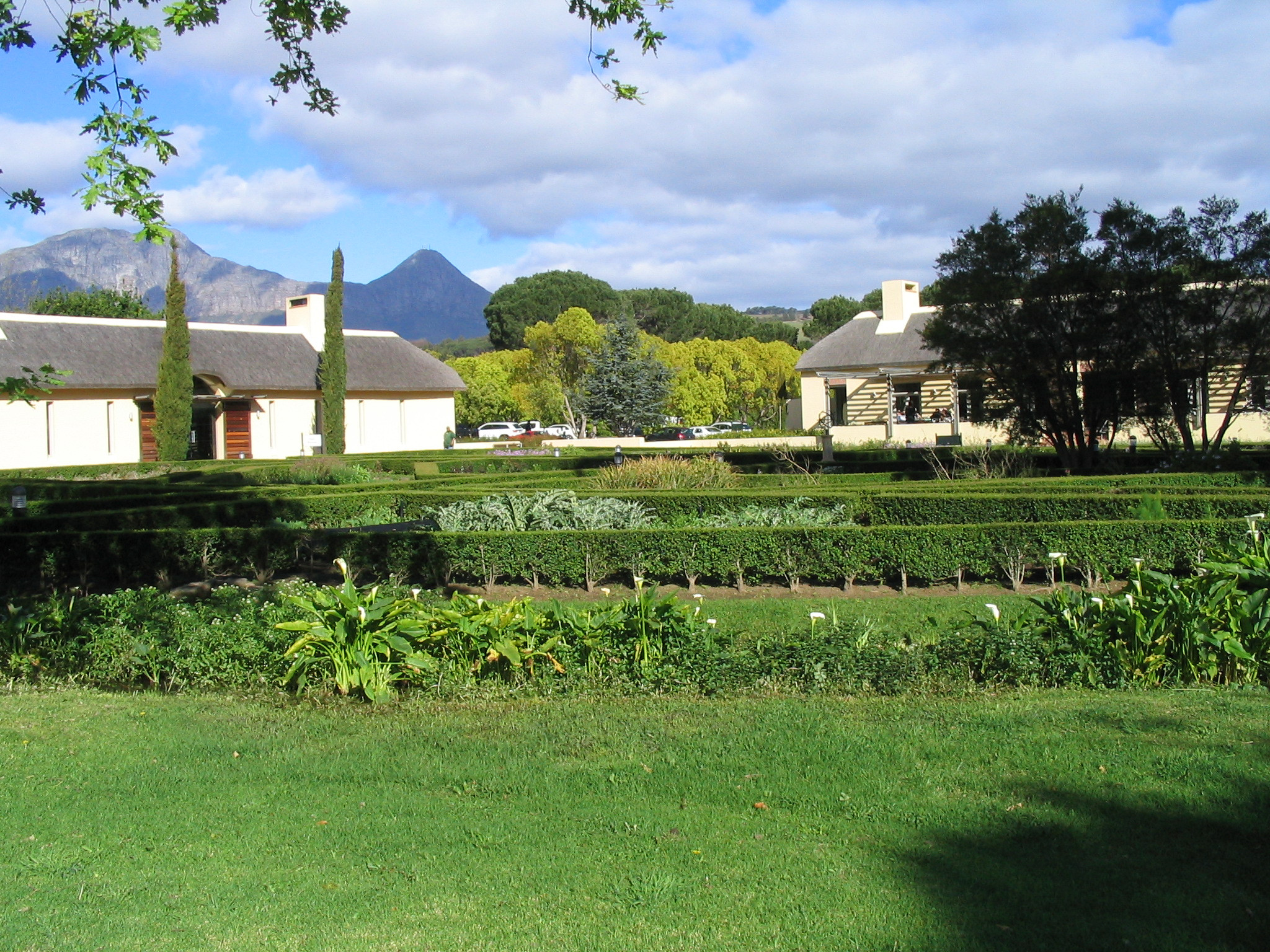
Herb garden in front of Stables restaurant and wine tasting centre

Vergelegen (Dutch: "remotely situated") is a historic wine estate in Somerset West, in the Western Cape province of South Africa.

== Foundation ==
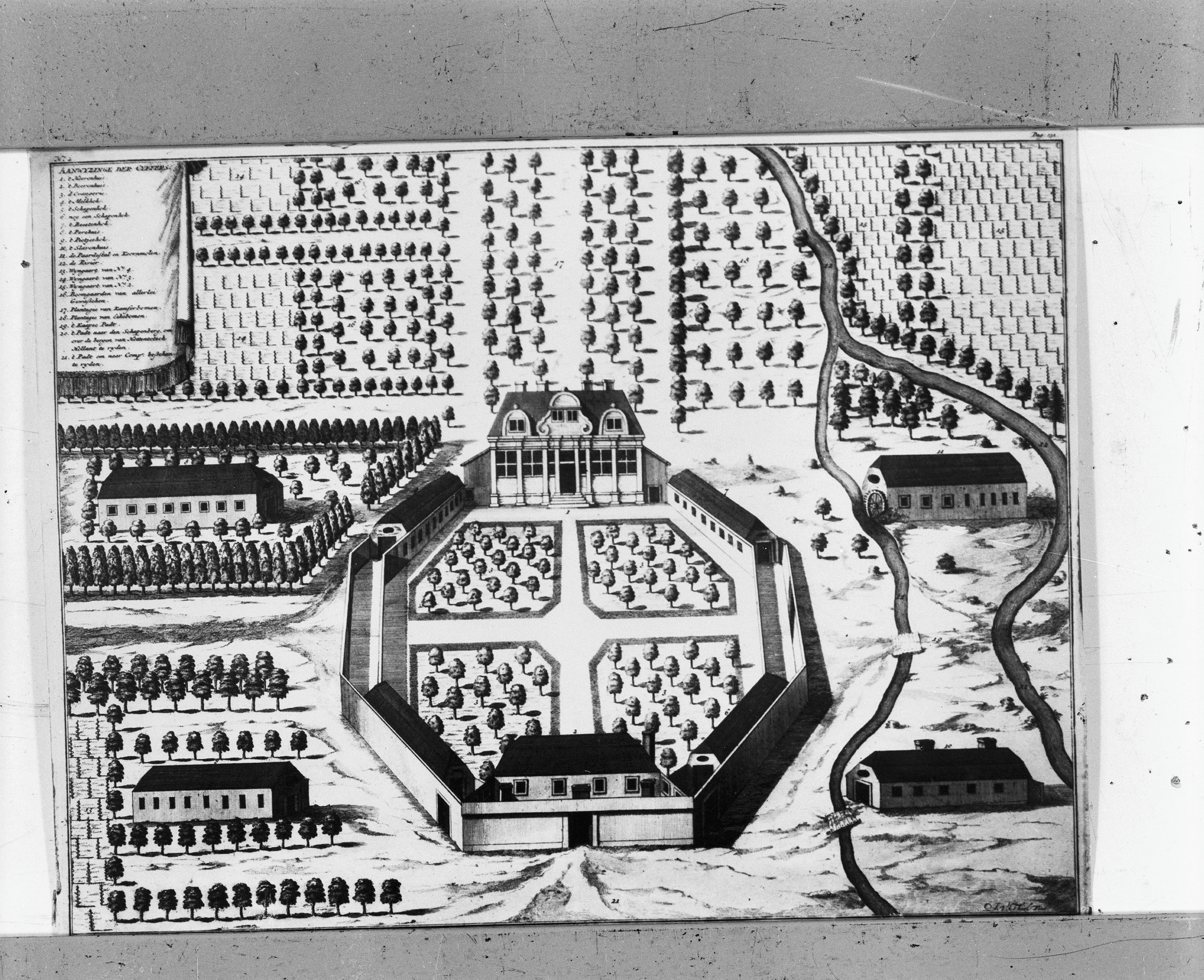
Drawing of the estate in the early 1700's with surrounding buildings and its octagonal courtyard

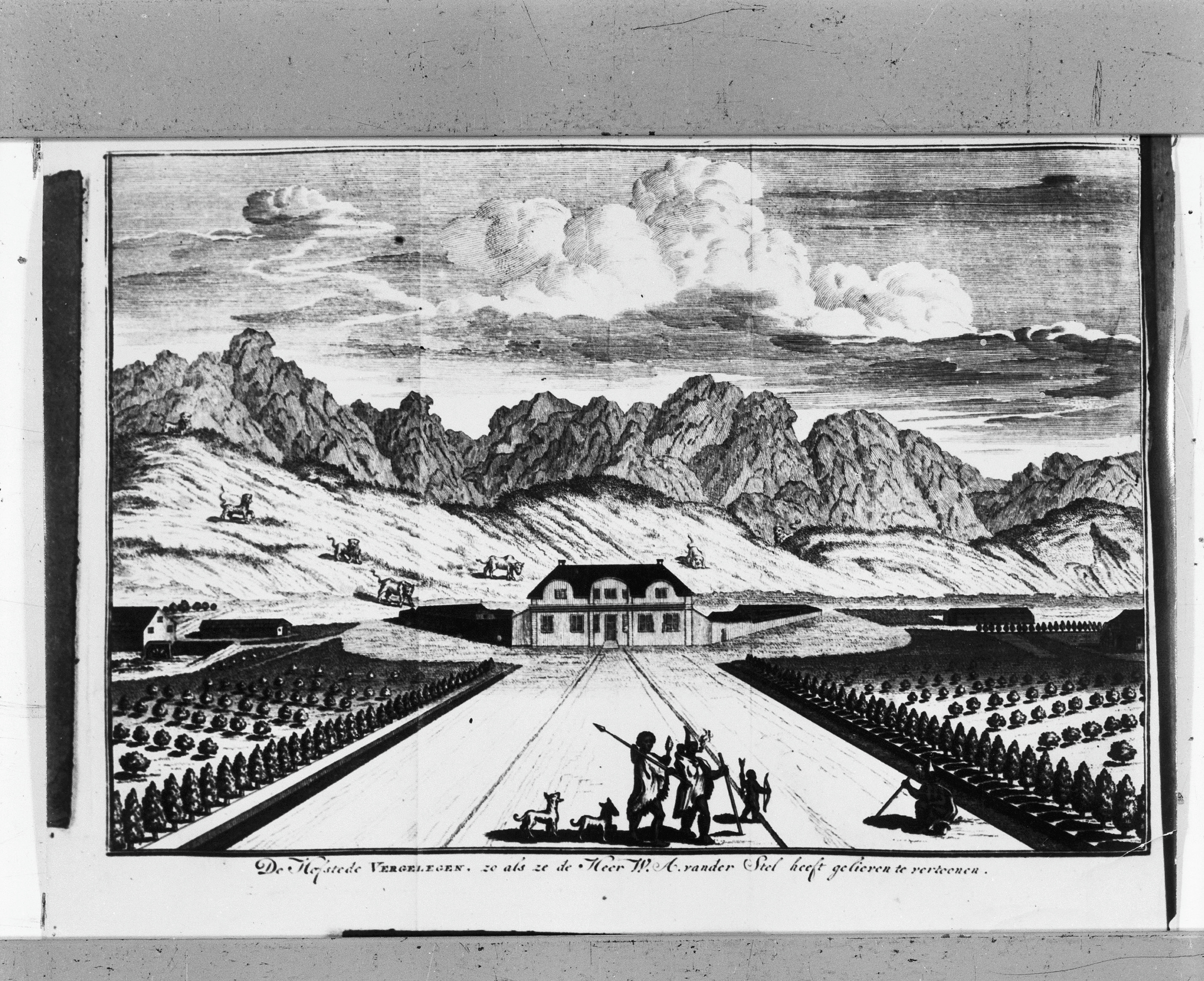
Vergelegen in the early 1700's with the Hottentots-Holland Mountains in the background

The estate was settled in 1700 by an early Governor of the Cape, Willem Adriaan van der Stel. Van der Stel used the resources of his employer, the Dutch East India Company, to improve the estate, and in 1706 a number of free burghers at the Cape drew up a formal memorandum complaining about van der Stel's illegal activities. This memorandum contains some of the earliest images and descriptions of the estate. As a consequence of the free burghers' complaints, van der Stel and other officials were sacked, and three-quarters of the original Vergelegen estate was sold off, drastically reducing the size of the property.

== Vineyards ==
In 1798 the estate was sold to the Theunissen family, who planted extensive vineyards and concentrated on the production of grapes until an infestation by the phylloxera louse in the late nineteenth century wiped out most of Vergelegen's grape production.

== Sir Lionel Phillips ==
In 1917 Vergelegen was purchased by the millionaire mine magnate Sir Lionel Phillips as a present for his wife Florence. She remodeled aspects of the house and planted the magnificent gardens, but removed the few remaining acres dedicated to grapes.

== "Punch" Barlow and Anglo American ==
Following the death of Lady Phillips the estate was purchased by the Barlow family, and Charles "Punch" Barlow oversaw the reintroduction of limited planting of grapes. However, by the time Anglo American bought the property from Barlow's son in 1987, no grapes were being cultivated.

== Wine production ==
Anglo American concentrated on the production of high-quality wines from Vergelegen. The first vintage under the company's stewardship was harvested in 1992. Within ten years the estate was recognised as producing some of South Africa's finest wines, with the cabernet sauvignon blend Vergelegen, single-vineyard cabernet sauvignon Vergelegen V and semillon/sauvignon blanc blend Vergelegen White regularly achieving a maximum five stars in John Platter's annual Guide to South African Wines.

== The estate ==
Vergelegen's Cape Dutch house, gardens and winery are open to visitors. Interesting features of any visit include a trip up the mountain to the winery plant, and a walk under the vast Camphor laurels (Cinnamomum camphora) planted by Willem van der Stel in about 1705 which have been declared a protected provincial heritage site. The winery is uniquely shaped in an octagon form that is mirrored on the vineyard's labels.

== Awards ==
- Vergelegen V 2001 – John Platter Guide 2005 (5 Stars), Selection Mondiales des Vins 2004 Grand Jury Prize for South Africa
- Vergelegen Red 2001 – Mondiale Bruxelles 2005 Gold, International Wine Challenge 2004 Bronze, Fairbairn Capital Trophy Wine Show 2003 Gold
- Best overall performance – Old Mutual Trophy Wine Show SA 2002–2004 and 2006
- Best Winery – Wine Magazine SA 2004–2006
- New World Winery of the Year – Wine Enthusiast Magazine USA 2005 and 2006
- Great Wine Capitals Best of Wine Tourism South African winner
- First place in the category: Innovative Wine Tourism Experiences - 2025 Great Wine Capitals Best of Wine Tourism Award.

== Gallery ==
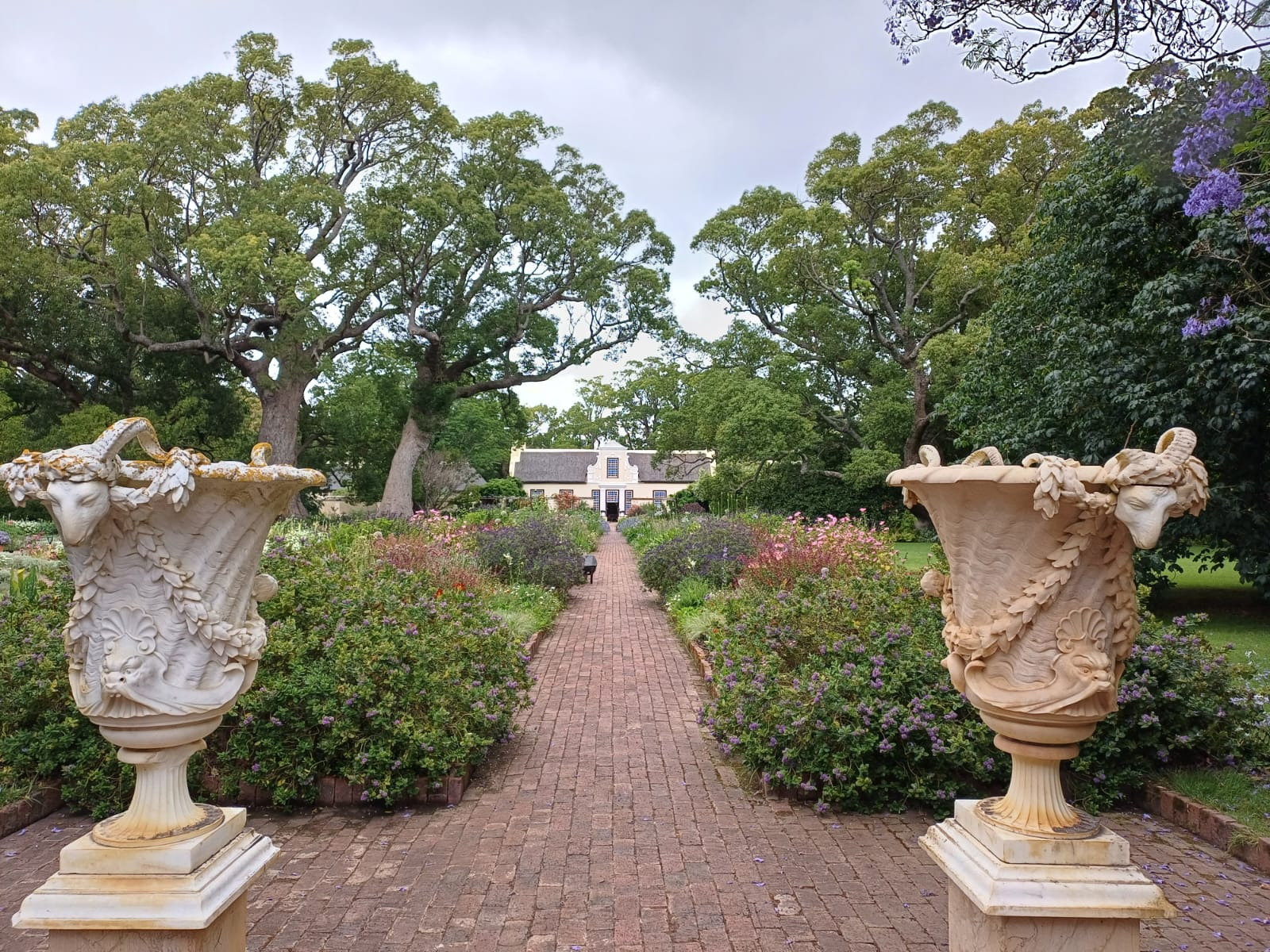
Vergelegen Homestead from the entrance of the Octagonal Garden

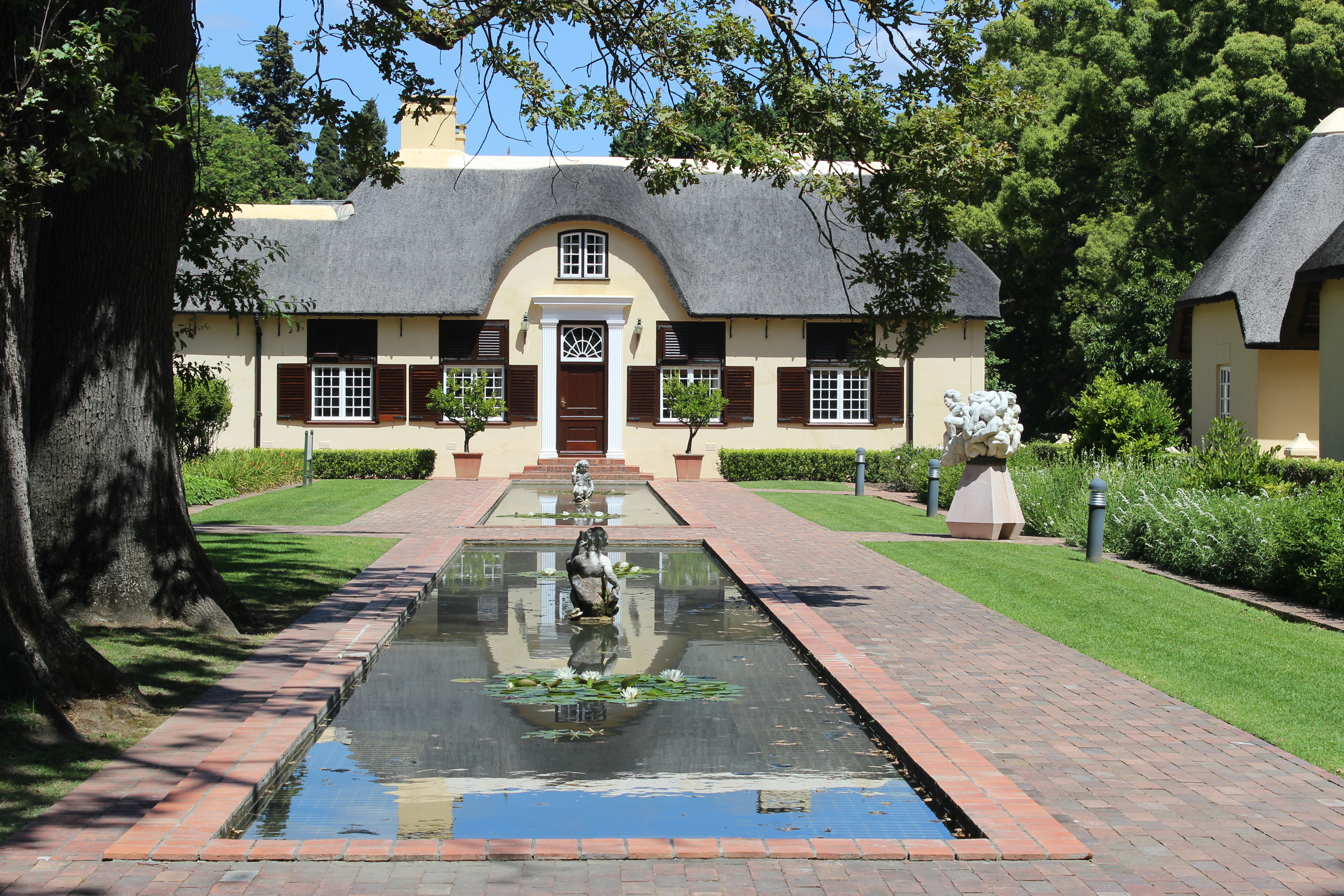
Reflection Garden

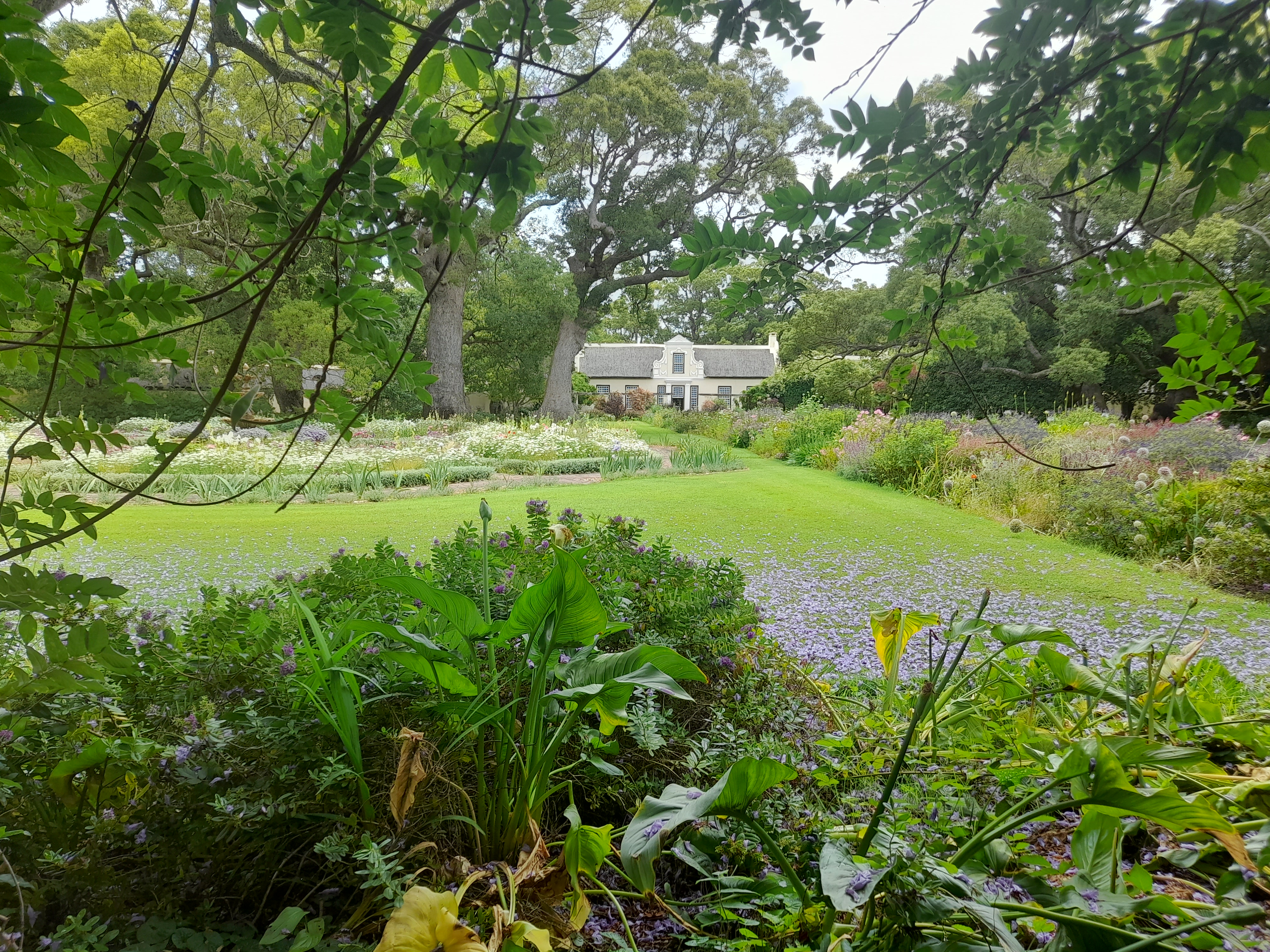
The homestead from the Octagonal Garden

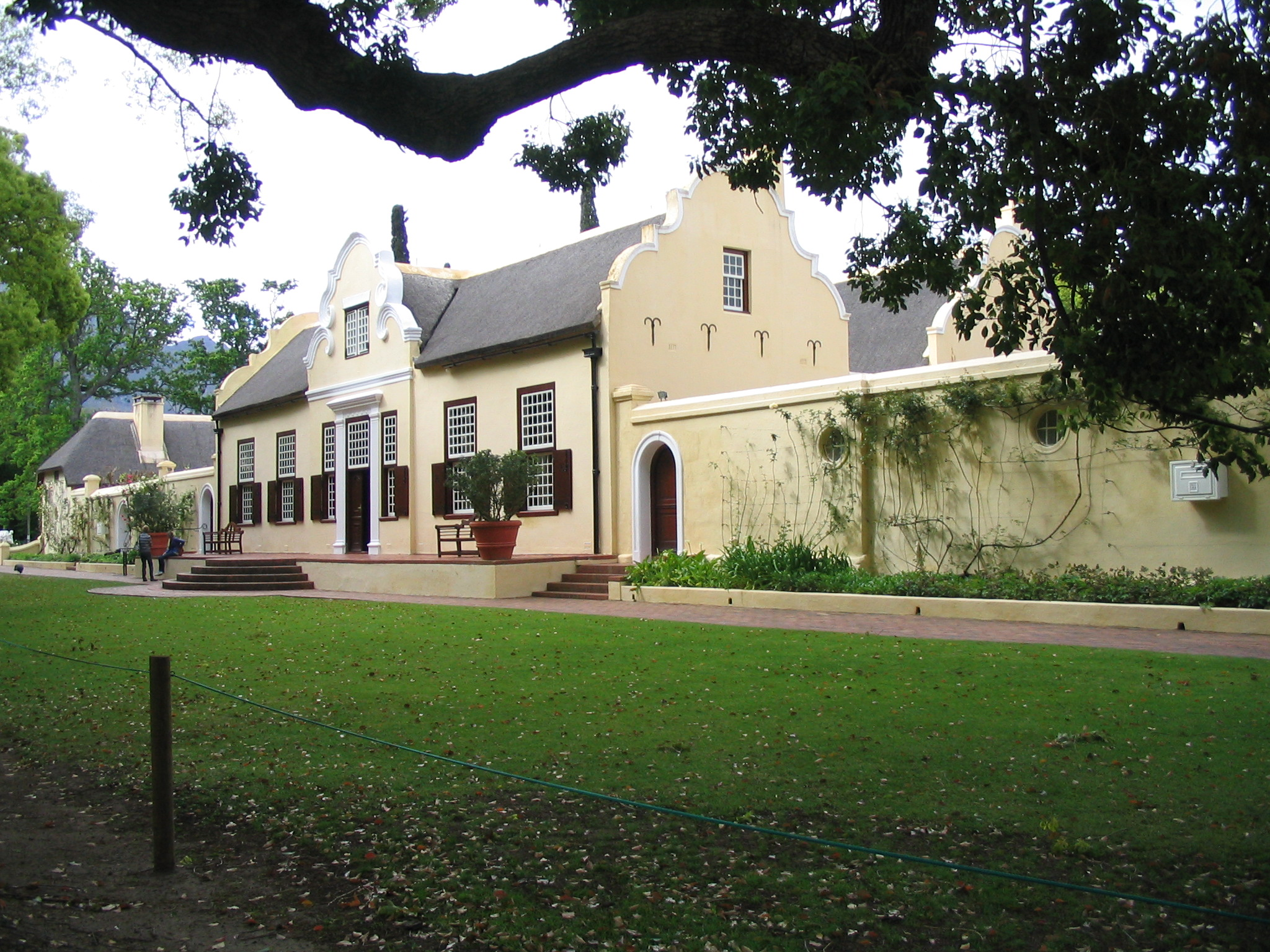
Vergelegen Manor House

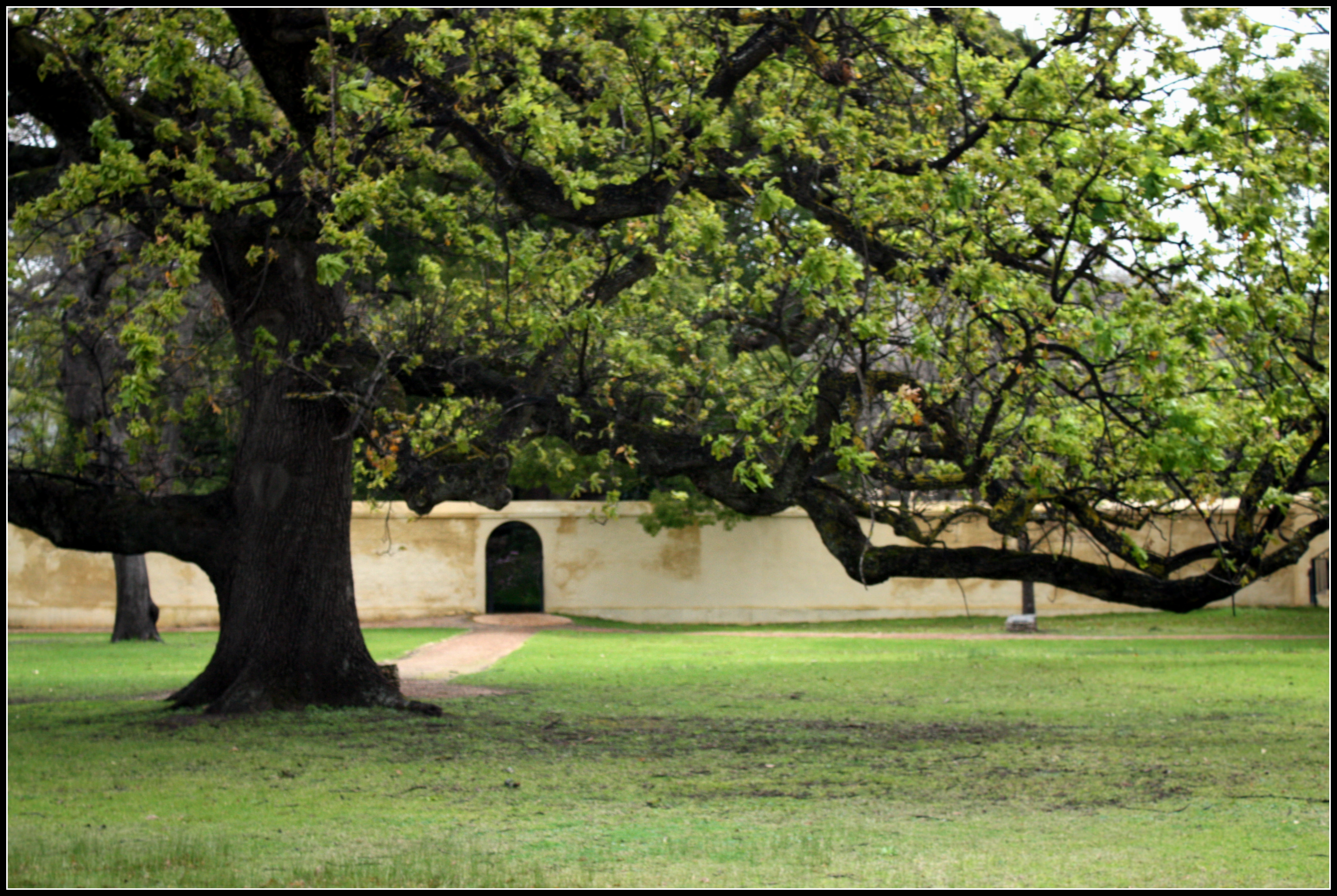
The Royal Oak tree near the homestead
