= Sir Lowry's Pass =

Mountain pass in Western Cape, South Africa

Coordinates: 34°08′59″S 18°55′42″E

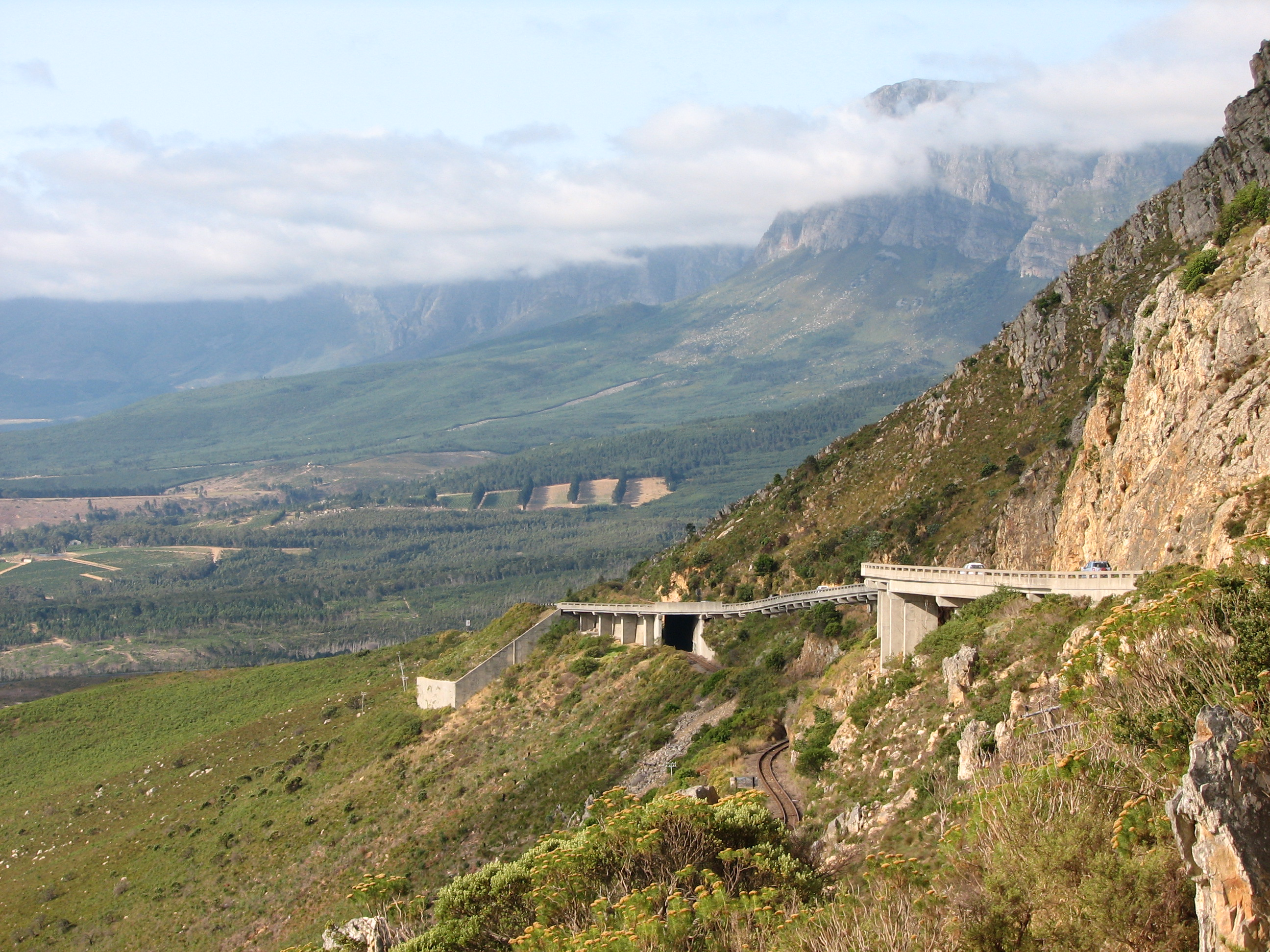
Sir Lowry's Pass

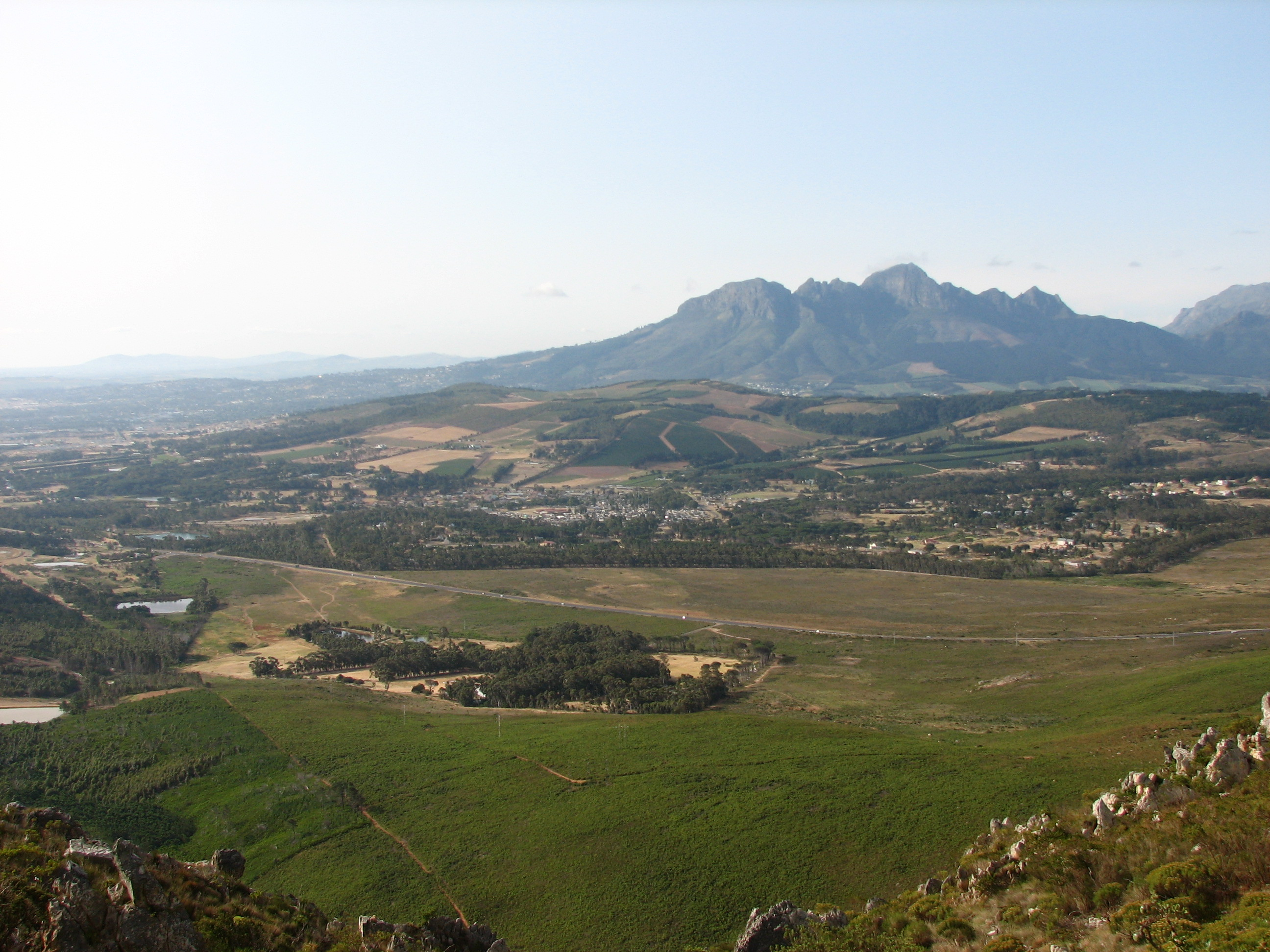
View from Sir Lowry's Pass towards Somerset West and Helderberg.

Sir Lowry's Pass is a mountain pass on the N2 national road in the Western Cape province of South Africa. It crosses the Hottentots Holland Mountains between Somerset West and the Elgin valley, on the main route between Cape Town and the Garden Route. A railway line also crosses the mountain range near this point.

The pass is four lanes wide and is subject to heavy traffic, especially at the start and end of holiday periods, when many people travel in and out of the Cape Town area, and is sometimes seen as an accident black spot.

The summit of the pass is at 460 m. There is a viewpoint at this point which is also used as a paragliding launch point. Baboons are often seen in this area. The top of the pass was formerly the start of the Boland Hiking Trail, but this section of the trail was closed after a number of deaths due to the difficult hiking conditions. On the Grabouw side, the road passes the Steenbras Dam.

Sir Lowry's Pass Village is situated near the base of the pass.

== History ==
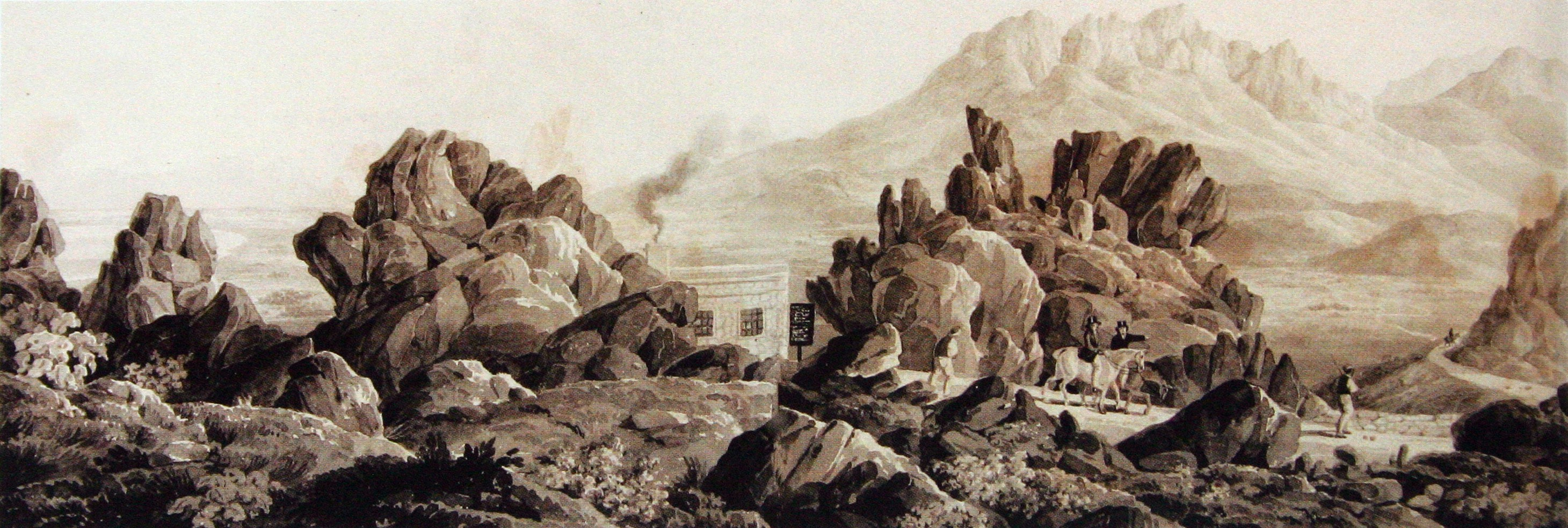
Summit of Sir Lowry's Pass - Toll-keeper's house 1832 pen and wash drawing by Charles D'Oyly

The mountain crossing in that region was known by the indigenous Khoi people as the Gantouw or Eland's Pass, and was used as a stock route. The Dutch and British settlers at the Cape built a rough pass called the Hottentots Holland Kloof Pass following the Gantouw route. The first recorded crossing was in 1664, and by 1821 the pass was seeing 4500 ox-wagons per year crossing into the interior, but the route was so severe that more than 20% of them were damaged. The ruts left by these wagons being dragged over the mountains can still be seen, and were declared a National Monument in 1958.

Starting in 1828, a new pass was constructed on the current route that would allow ox wagons to navigate the pass without difficulty. Construction began at a site about 2 km to the south of the Hottentots Holland Kloof, by the engineer Charles Michell using convict labour. The new pass was opened on 6 July 1830, and named after Lowry Cole, the Governor of the Cape Colony at the time. The initial estimated cost of the project at the time was £2,672 8s and 6d (equivalent to £10,300,000 or R220,000,000 in 2014) with an actual cost upon completion of £3,000 (equivalent to £11,580,000 or R256,000,000 in 2014). A toll-house was set up on the top of mountain to offset the cost of the project to the Cape government collecting £490 in its first two years in addition to additional indirect tax revenue derived from increased use of port facilities and other tolls as a result of the increase in economic activity the pass created.

The pass remained unchanged until a railway line to Caledon that runs parallel to the road was built in 1902 and a level crossing halfway up the road's incline was built. The road remained narrow to the extent that vehicles could only pass each other at selected points on the pass. In the 1930s, the pass was widened and tarred; it was further improved in the 1956 when it was further widened. In 1984 the upper parts were widened to four lanes in a reinforced concrete construction at a cost of R4.5 million.

== Gallery ==
Road Bridge and Railway Line

Soap Bubble Curve

Looking down the incline

Railway tunnel through the mountain

Looking up from the railway station at the base

Sir Lowry Pass station

Sir Lowry Pass tunnel
