= Steenbras River =

River in the Western Cape of South Africa

The Steenbras River is a small river in the Western Cape province of South Africa, with its source near Grabouw. It is situated between the Hottentots Holland and Kogelberg mountains and drains into False Bay south of Gordon's Bay. The river has been dammed in two places—the Steenbras Upper and Lower Dams—to supply water to the city of Cape Town. The upper dam also serves as a reservoir for the Steenbras pumped-storage hydroelectricity scheme, which supplements Cape Town's electricity supply during periods of peak demand.

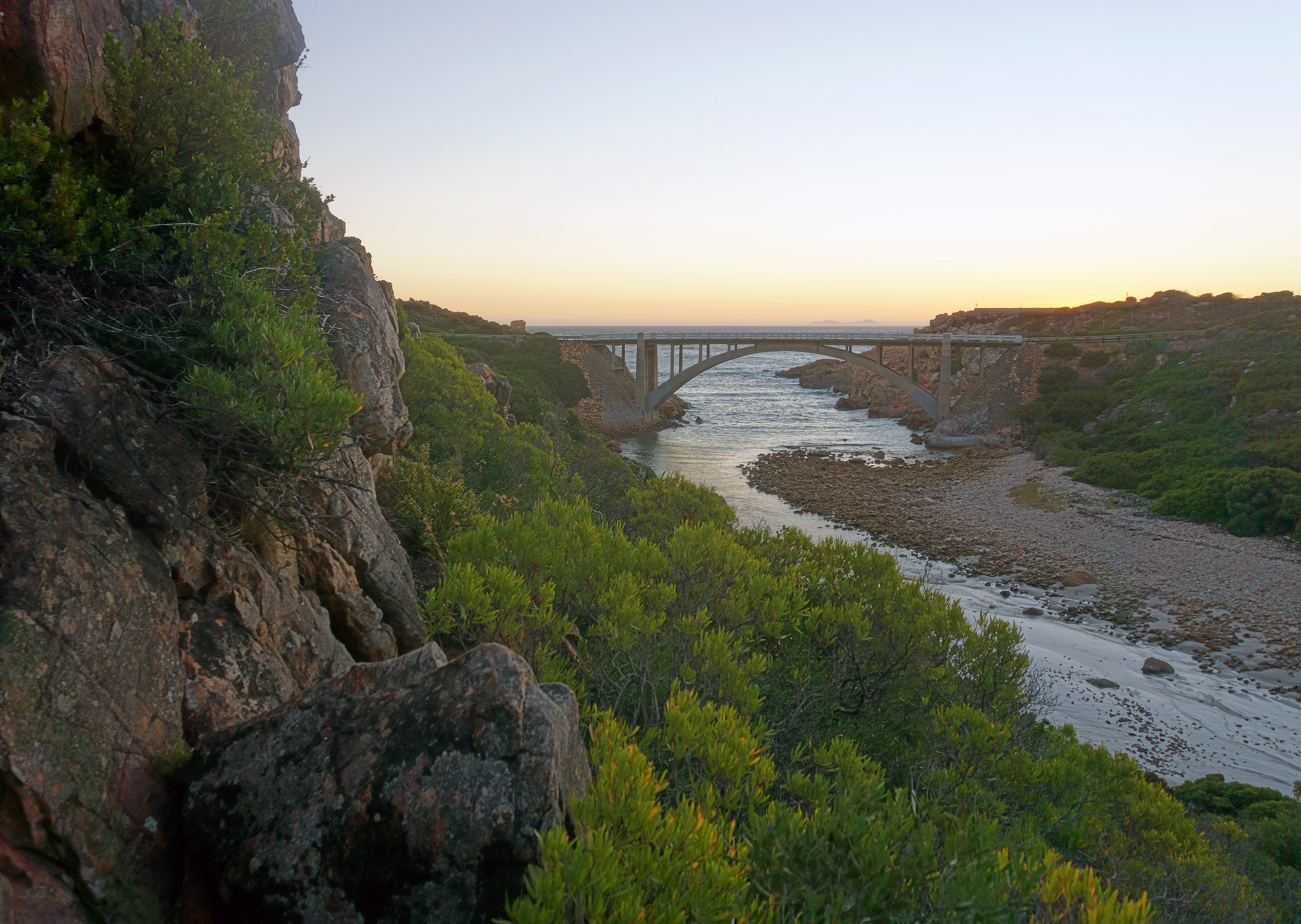
Bridge (R44) over the Steenbras River

== Catchment and Hydrology ==
The main catchment has an area of approximately 70 km^{2}, including the dams, and lies between the Hottentots Holland Mountains to the northwest and the Kogelberg to the southeast, in the Cape Fold Belt. The valley upstream of the lower dam was a fairly broad, open valley. Downstream of the dam, the river flows through a steep-sided, rocky valley to the narrow coastal plain on the eastern shore of False Bay. The dams are fed by the main river as well as numerous unnamed streams and seasonal drainage lines. The length of the main stream, including the dams, is about 17 km.

The geology of the catchment consists mostly of quartzitic sandstone with thin layers of shale and conglomerate of the Table Mountain Sandstone. This geology forms the Table Mountain Group aquifer, a fractured rock aquifer with complex underground water pathways, which makes city-operated artificial recharge unfeasible in the area.

The long-term average runoff of the catchment was estimated to be 50 × 10^{6}m^{3} per annum. However, the flow has been significantly altered by the dams. According to a 2009 Department of Water and Sanitation study, the discharge at the Ecological Water Reserve (EWR) site in July 2009 was 0.42 m³/s, similar to the present-day average for that month (0.41 m³/s) but nearly double the 0.26 m³/s expected under natural, undammed conditions.

Most of the catchment lies within the boundaries of the City of Cape Town. The mean annual rainfall recorded at the dam between 1963 and 1981 was 984 mm, but it is higher in the upper reaches of the catchment, in the order of 2,000 mm per annum.

=== Estuary ===
The river mouth is a small valley cut into the narrow coastal strip, with steep rock shores and wave-rounded boulder beaches further inshore. Waves reach up the tidal part of the river, which faces the prevailing south-westerly swell, making it a high-energy coastline. The South African Environmental Observation Network reports that the Steenbras estuary shows a moderate degree of ecological degradation and has characteristics more aligned with a small fjord than a typical estuary.

== Water quality ==
The water is generally slightly acidic and naturally stained brown by tannins from the fynbos vegetation. It has good taste and low suspended solids but is treated to neutralise the pH and remove the colour, partly for cosmetic reasons and partly to reduce corrosion in pipes. Despite the natural acidity and colour, the catchment maintains a high river health class (Class A). Ecological monitoring has confirmed the presence of sensitive taxa, such as net-winged midges (Blephariceridae), which have a maximum South African Scoring System (SASS) score of 15, indicating very high water quality.

== Ecology ==
The Steenbras Nature Reserve covers a significant portion of the catchment. Terrestrial vegetation types recorded from the lower reaches include riverine forest, wet mountain fynbos, riverine scrub, and drier mountain fynbos. Kogelberg Sandstone Fynbos is also found in the catchment.

The riparian zone includes species such as palmiet (Prionium serratum), Pennisetum macrourum, Juncus effusus, Juncus lomatophyllus, Erica caffra, Calopsis paniculata, Elegia capensis, Blechnum capense, and Todea barbara. The most prominent non-marginal species is the Cape myrtle (Metrosideros angustifolia). A 2009 report noted that while the riparian zone has a good diversity of species, its aerial cover and abundance have been reduced, partly due to the effects of damming and altered flooding regimes.

== Roads ==
The R44 provincial coastal highway from Gordon's Bay to Hermanus crosses the river about 200 m inshore of the mouth. The N2 national highway crosses the river a few kilometres east of Sir Lowry's Pass.

== History ==
Consulting engineer Thomas Stewart first investigated potential dam sites on the Steenbras River in the late 1890s as a possible water source for the municipalities of Mowbray and Rondebosch. The river was first crossed by European explorers from the Cape settlement circa the mid-17th century. Its original Dutch name was Steenbrazans rivier, assumed to be named after the red steenbras (Petrus rupestris), which could be caught from the rocky coastline near the river mouth.

The river was dammed in the early 20th century as a water supply for Cape Town. The Steenbras Dam was completed in 1921 with an original capacity of 2.9 × 10^{6}m^{3}. The dam wall was later raised in 1928 and 1952, increasing the capacity to 34.3 × 10^{6}m^{3}.

In 1977, the Steenbras Upper Dam was constructed directly upstream. It is used for the Steenbras pumped-storage hydroelectricity scheme, which supplements Cape Town's electricity supply during periods of peak demand.

The dams are part of the Western Cape Water Supply System (WCWSS), an interconnected system of six main dams, pipelines, tunnels, distribution networks, and several minor dams in the Western Cape. Some are owned and operated by the Department of Water and Sanitation and some by the City of Cape Town.
