= Spatalla prolifera =

Conservation status
- Near Threatened (IUCN 3.1)

Scientific classification
- Kingdom: Plantae
- Clade: Tracheophytes
- Clade: Angiosperms
- Clade: Eudicots
- Order: Proteales
- Family: Proteaceae
- Genus: Spatalla
- Species: S. prolifera

Binomial name
- Spatalla prolifera (Thunb.) Salisb. ex Knight

Species of flowering plant

Spatalla prolifera, the palmiet spoon, is a flower-bearing shrub that belongs to the genus Spatalla and forms part of the fynbos. The plant is native to the Western Cape of South Africa.

== Description ==
The shrub grows upright and grows to 1 m (3.3 ft) tall and flowers from September to December. The plant dies after a fire but the seeds survive. The plant is bisexual and pollinated by insects. Two months after the plant has flowered, the ripe seeds fall to the ground where they are spread by ants.

== Distribution and habitat ==
The plant occurs in the Hottentots-Holland Mountains and Kleinmond Mountains along the Palmiet and Steenbras River. It grows in swampy soil, river banks and wetlands at elevations of 50–460 m (160–1,510 ft)
