= Steenbras Upper Dam =

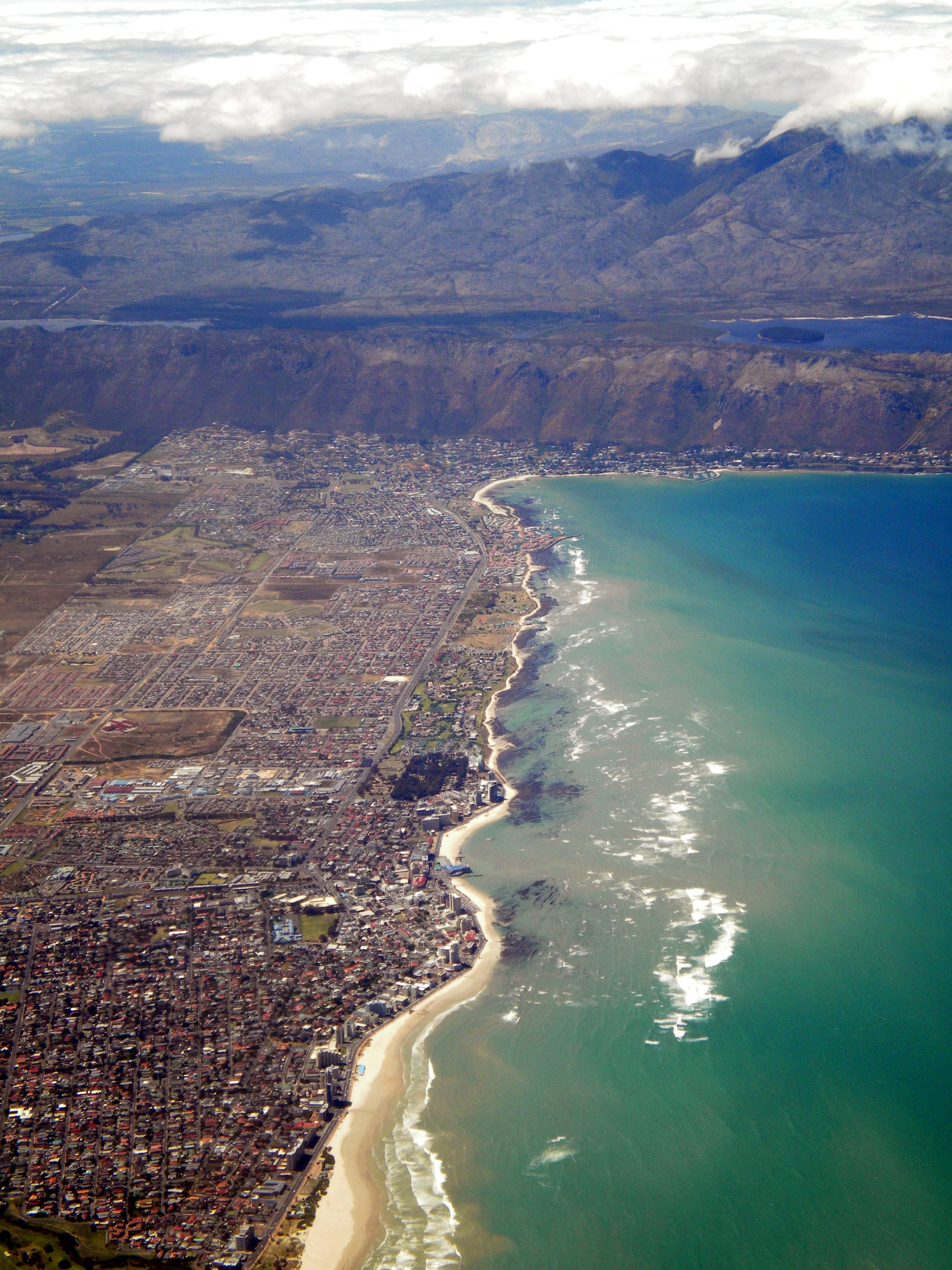
- visible at upper left
- Interactive map of Steenbras Upper Dam
- Location: Western Cape, South Africa
- Coordinates: 34°10′5″S 18°54′5″E
- Opening date: 1977
- Owner: City of Cape Town

Dam and spillways
- Type of dam: Earth-fill
- Impounds: Steenbras River
- Height: 34 m (112 ft)
- Length: 940 m (3,080 ft)

Reservoir
- Creates: Steenbras Upper Reservoir
- Total capacity: 31,767 Ml (1,121.8×10^{6} cu ft)
- Catchment area: 29.7 km^{2} (11.5 sq mi)
- Surface area: 263 ha (650 acres)

Steenbras Upper Dam is an earth-fill type dam located in the Hottentots Holland Mountains above Gordons Bay in the Western Cape, South Africa. It impounds the Steenbras River upstream of the older Steenbras Dam. The dam was constructed in 1977 for the City of Cape Town and serves mainly for municipal and industrial use. The hazard potential of the dam has been ranked high (3).

Map of the Steenbras Dams and their catchment area

Steenbras Upper Dam also functions as the upper reservoir of the city's Steenbras pumped-storage hydroelectric power scheme, with a lower reservoir at the foot of the mountain. It is also linked by an open canal and pipeline to the Rockview Dam, which acts as the upper reservoir of the Palmiet Pumped Storage Scheme, a separate pumped-storage scheme operated by Eskom and the Department of Water and Sanitation. The link allows water from the Palmiet River to be transferred to the dam.

== See also ==
- List of reservoirs and dams in South Africa
- List of rivers of South Africa
