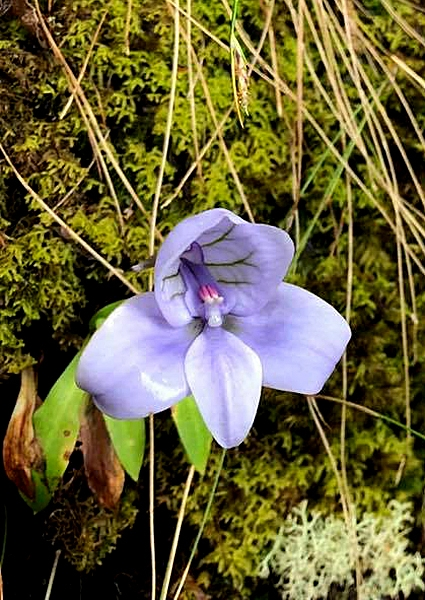

Scientific classification
- Kingdom: Plantae
- Clade: Tracheophytes
- Clade: Angiosperms
- Clade: Monocots
- Order: Asparagales
- Family: Orchidaceae
- Subfamily: Orchidoideae
- Genus: Disa
- Species: D. longicornu

Binomial name
- Disa longicornu L.f.

Synonyms
- Disa longicornis Thunb.

= Disa longicornu =

Species of flowering plant

Disa longicornu, the drip disa, is a perennial plant and geophyte belonging to the genus Disa and is part of the fynbos. The plant is endemic to the Western Cape and occurs on Table Mountain and the Hottentots Holland Mountains. There are six subpopulations, they are located near hiking trails.

The flowers are in decline due to excessive picking by formal flower sellers as well as the informal sector.
