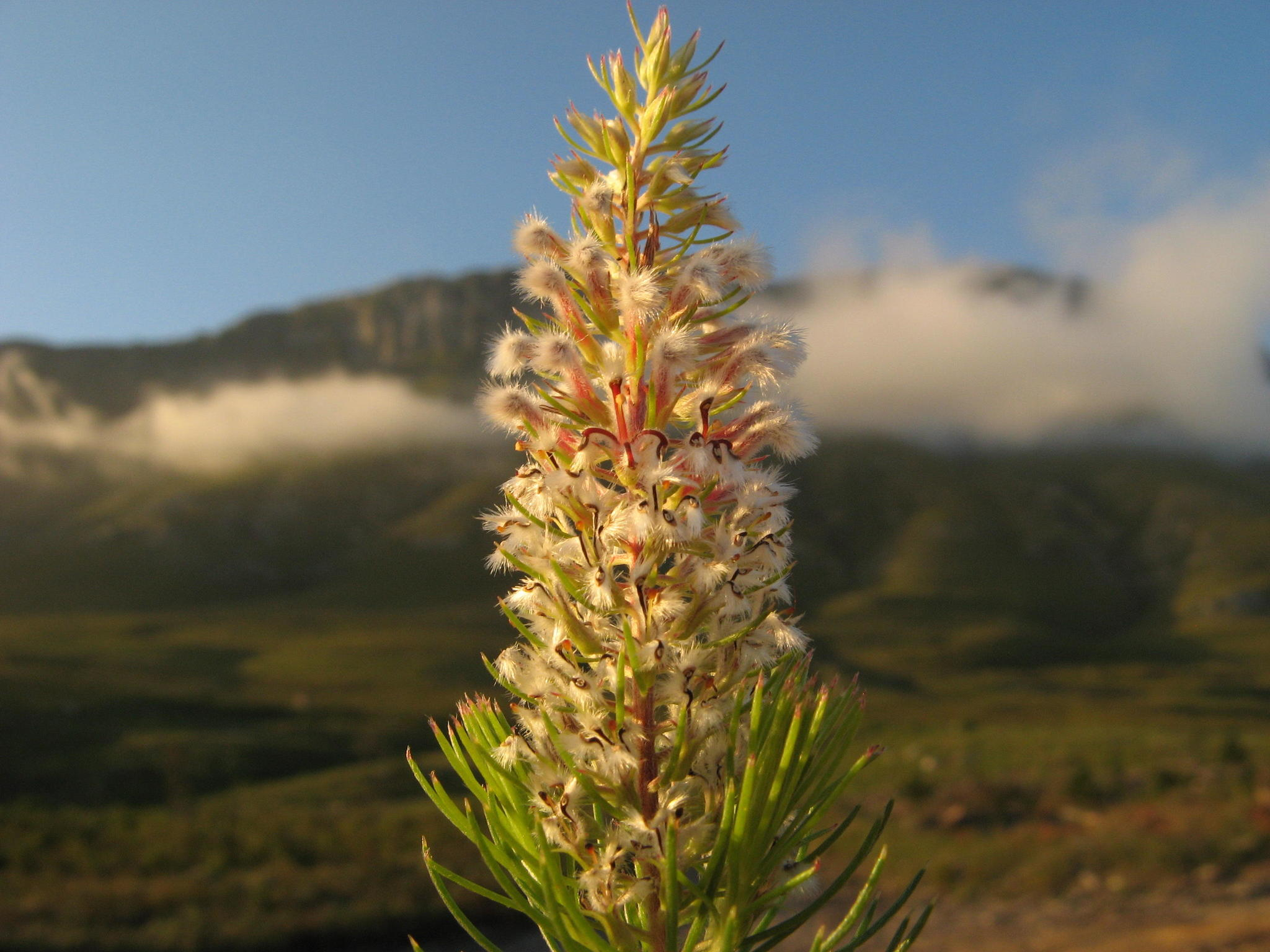

Conservation status
- Near Threatened (IUCN 3.1)

Scientific classification
- Kingdom: Plantae
- Clade: Tracheophytes
- Clade: Angiosperms
- Clade: Eudicots
- Order: Proteales
- Family: Proteaceae
- Genus: Spatalla
- Species: S. parilis

Binomial name
- Spatalla parilis Salisb. ex Knight

Synonyms
- Protea bracteolaris Poir.; Protea pyramidalis Poir.; Spatalla bolusii E.Phillips; Spatalla bombycina Knight; Spatalla pyramidalis R.Br.

= Spatalla parilis =

Species of flowering shrub

Spatalla parilis, the spike spoon, is a flowering shrub belonging to the genus Spatalla. It forms part of the fynbos. The plant is native to the Western Cape of South Africa.

== Description ==
The shrub grows upright and grows 1.5 m (4.9 ft) tall and flowers throughout the year. The plant dies after a fire but the seeds survive. The plant is bisexual and pollinated by insects. Two months after the plant has flowered, the ripe seeds fall to the ground where they are spread by ants.

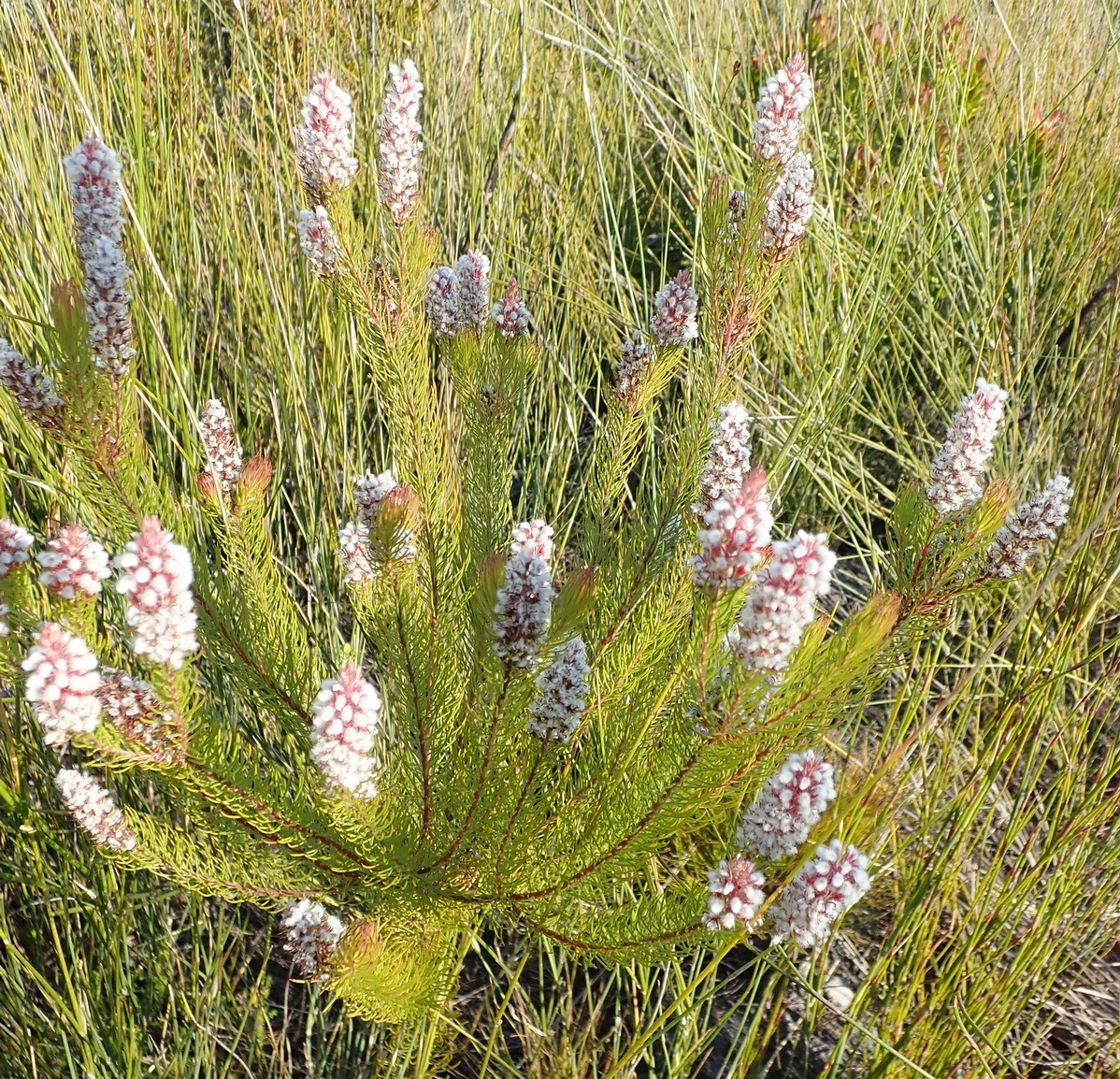

== Distribution and habitat ==
The plant occurs in the Hottentots Holland Mountains to the Riviersonderend Mountains and on top of the Langeberg at Garcia's Pass. The plant grows on cool, southern slopes at elevations of 300–1,550 m (980–5,090 ft).

== Gallery ==
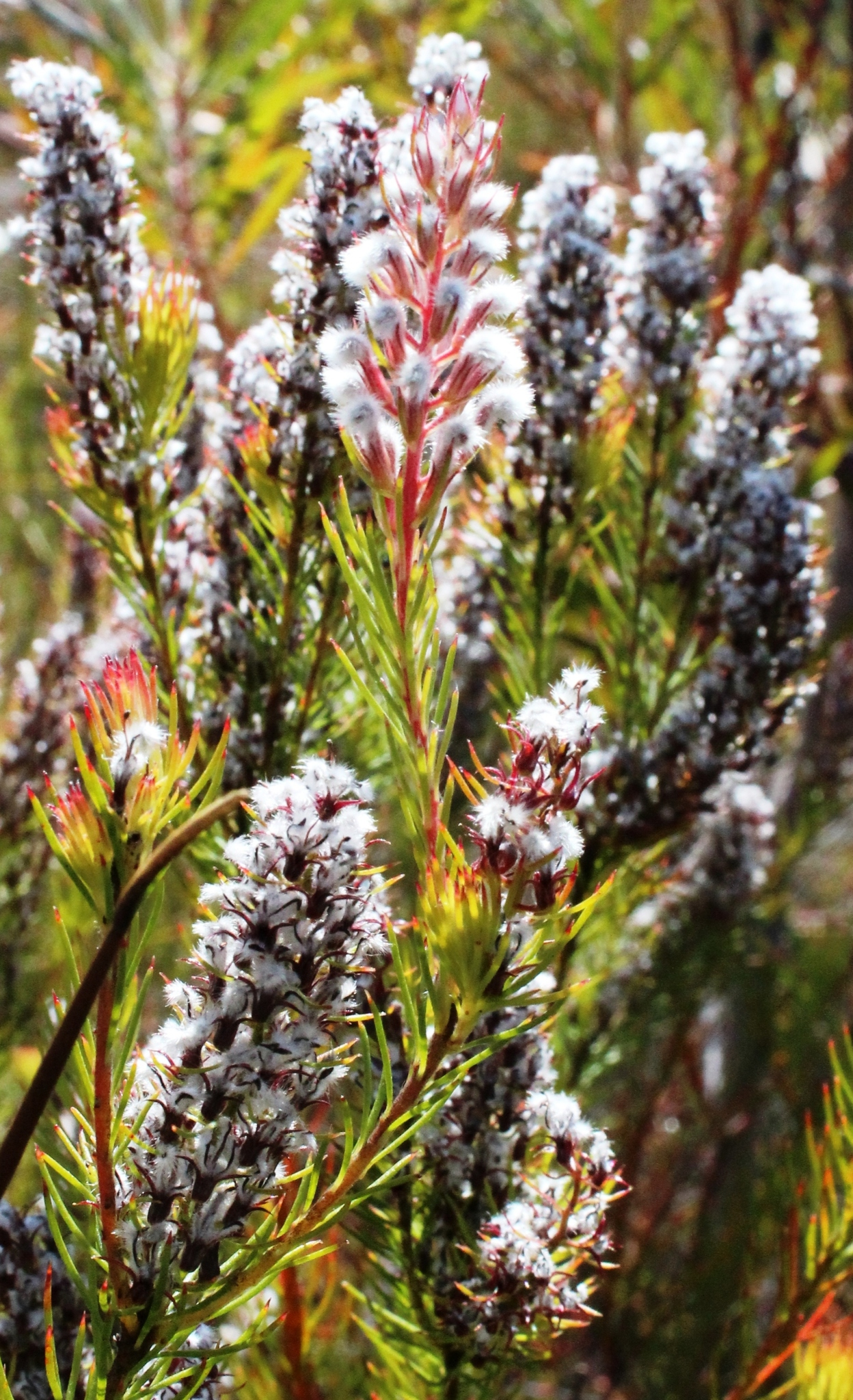

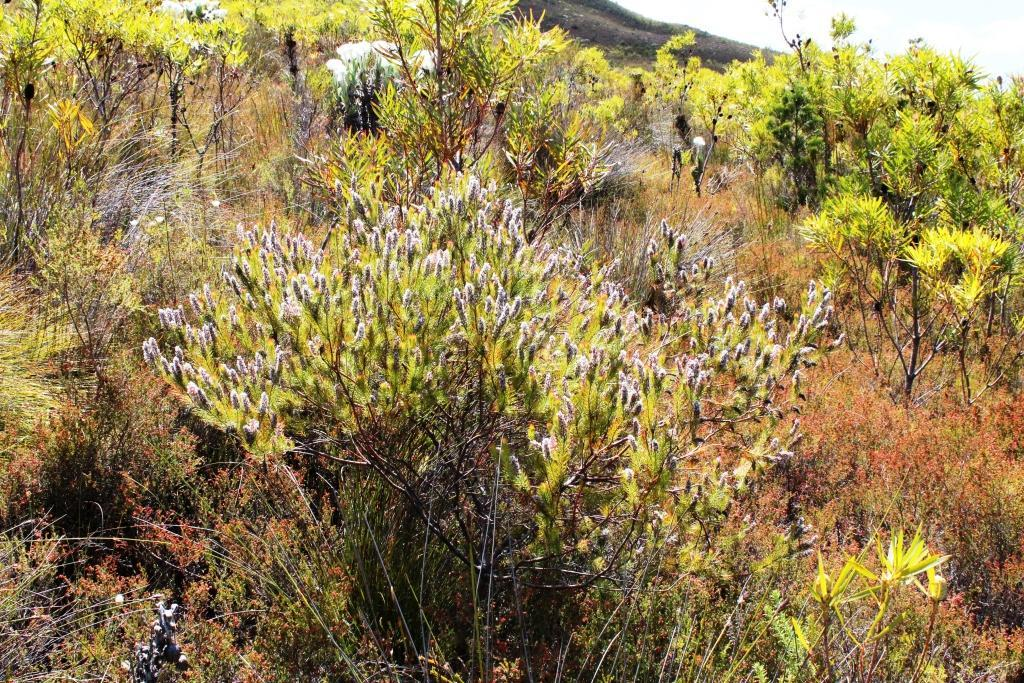

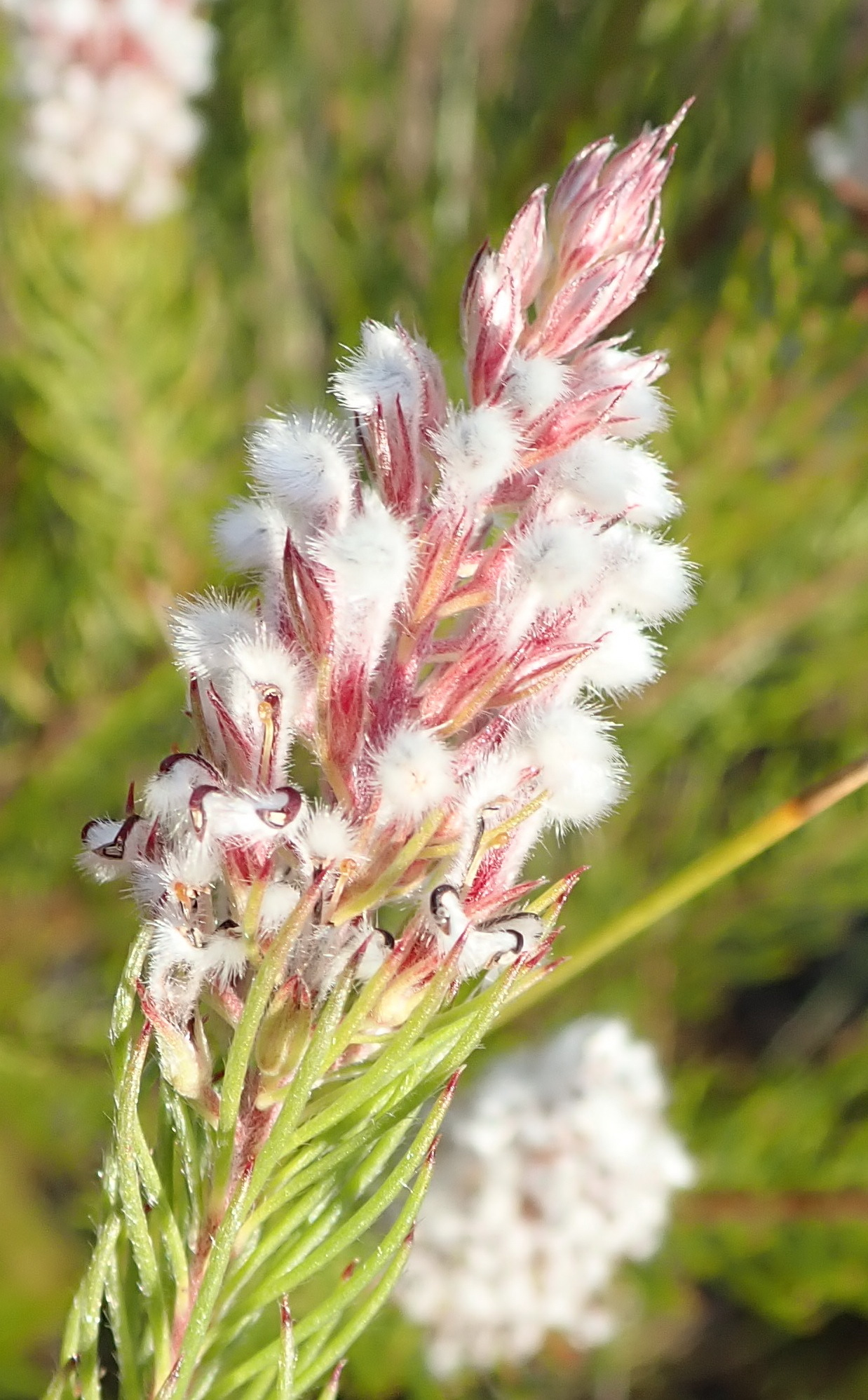

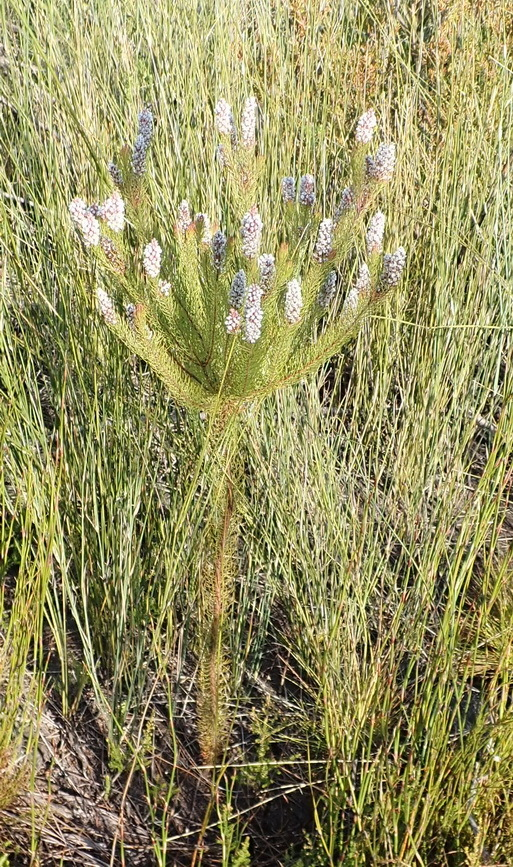
