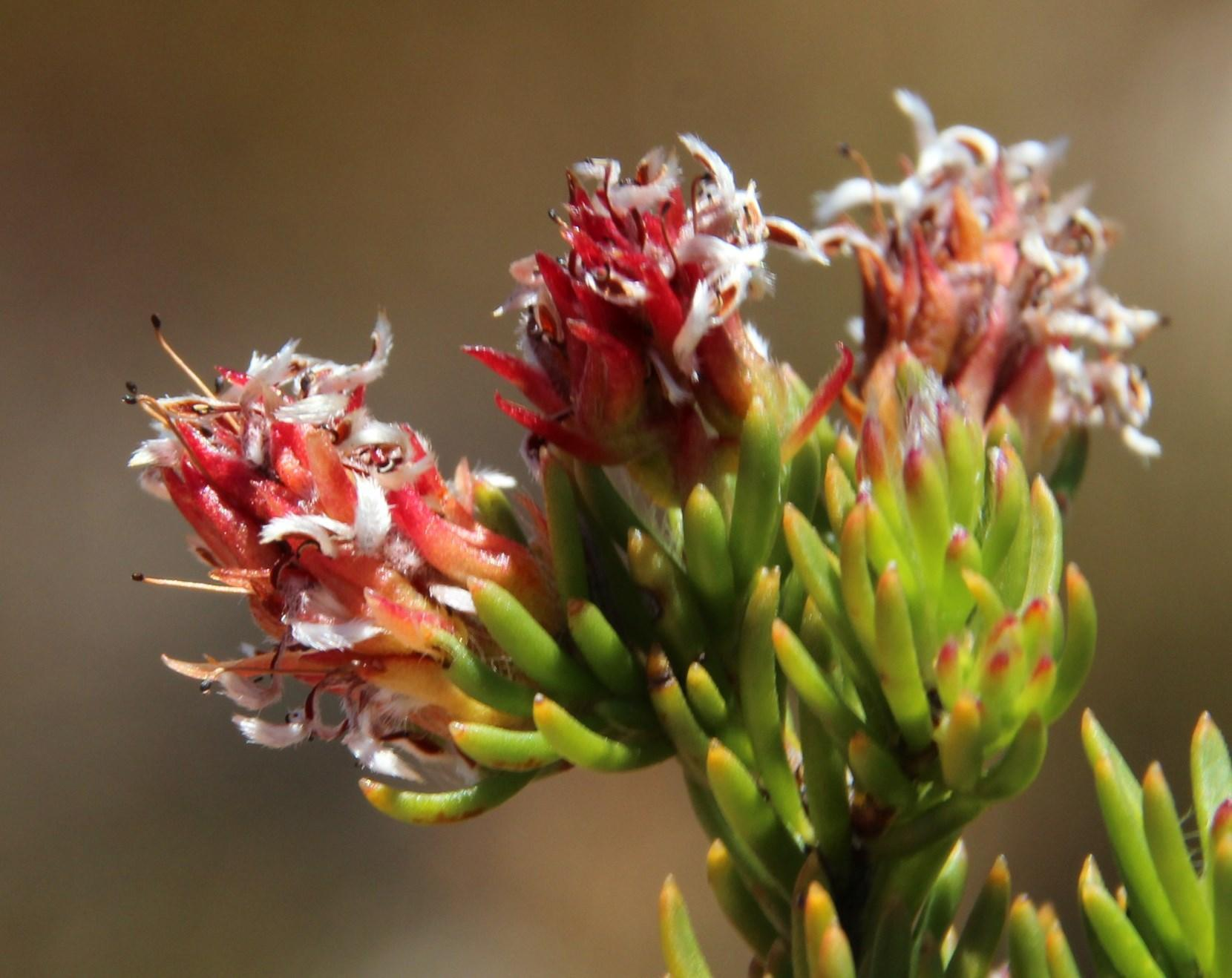

Conservation status
- Least Concern (IUCN 3.1).

Scientific classification
- Kingdom: Plantae
- Clade: Tracheophytes
- Clade: Angiosperms
- Clade: Eudicots
- Order: Proteales
- Family: Proteaceae
- Genus: Spatalla
- Species: S. confusa

Binomial name
- Spatalla confusa (E.Phillips) Rourke

= Spatalla confusa =

Species of flowering plant

Spatalla confusa the long-tube spoon is a flowering shrub native to the Western Cape Province of South Africa, where it forms part of the fynbos. It is found in the Cederberg up to the Hottentots Holland Mountains, Swartberg and Kammanassie Mountains
