= Serruria pinnata =

Conservation status
- Critically Endangered (IUCN 3.1)

Scientific classification
- Kingdom: Plantae
- Clade: Tracheophytes
- Clade: Angiosperms
- Clade: Eudicots
- Order: Proteales
- Family: Proteaceae
- Genus: Serruria
- Species: S. pinnata

Binomial name
- Serruria pinnata (Andr.) R.Br., (1810)

Species of plant

Serruria pinnata, the graceful spiderhead, is a flowering shrub that belongs to the genus Serruria and forms part of the fynbos. The plant is endemic to the Western Cape and occurs from the Cape Plain near Durbanville to the Hottentots-Hollandberge. The shrub is flat and grows 1.0 m high and flowers from July to October.

The plant survives a fire and sprouts again. Two months after flowering, the fruit falls and ants disperse the seeds. They store the seeds in their nests. The plant is unisexual. Pollination takes place through the action of insects. The plant grows in sand and granite slopes at elevations of 80–100 m.

== Sources ==
- REDLIST Sanbi
- Biodiversityexplorer
- Protea Atlas
- Plants of the World Online
