= Steenbras Power Station =

Power station in South Africa

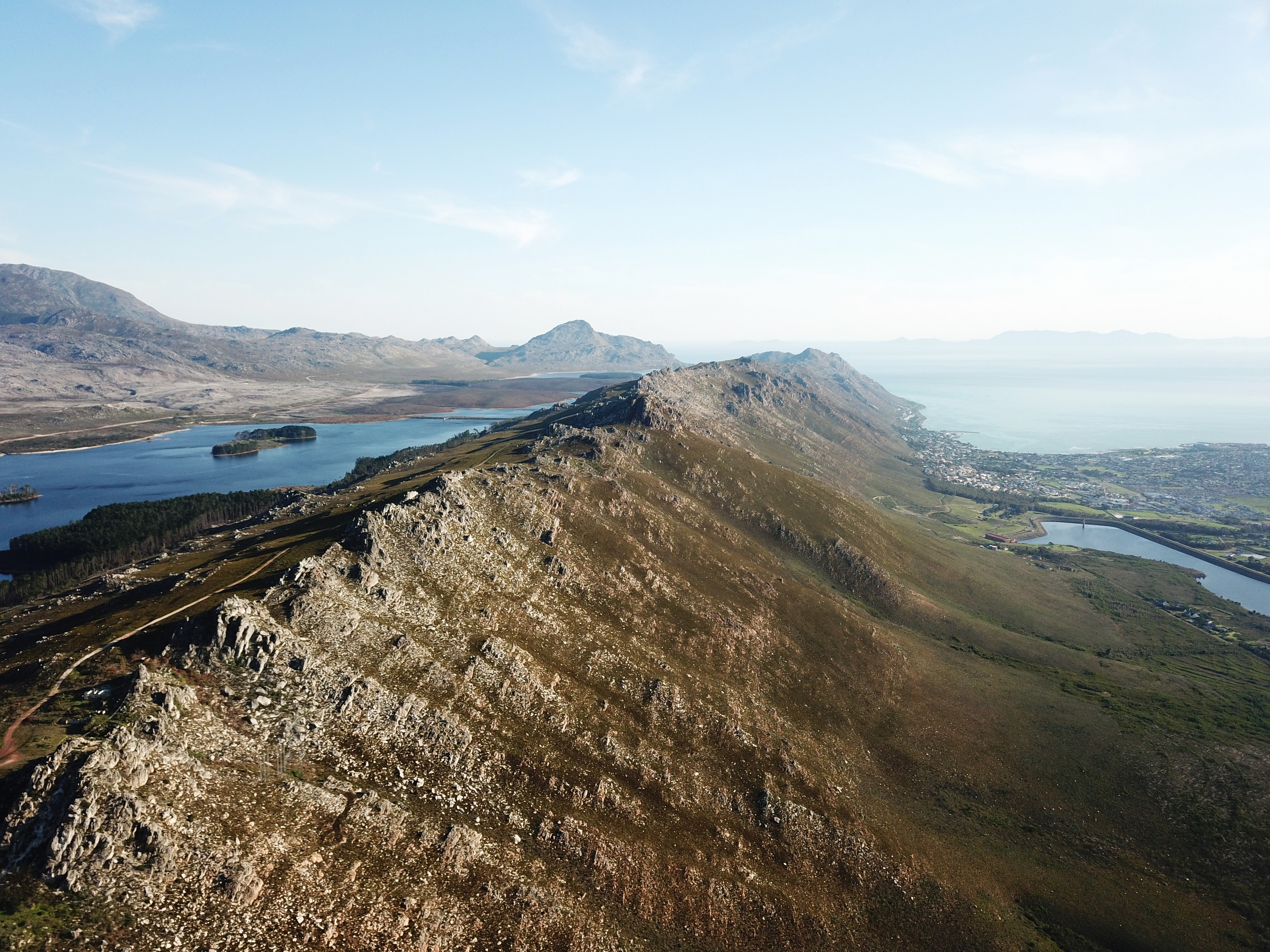
- Steenbras Upper Dam (l) and the lower reservoir (r)

- Map of South Africa showing the location of Steenbras Power Station Steenbras Power Station (Western Cape) Steenbras Power Station (South Africa)
- Country: South Africa
- Location: City of Cape Town, Western Cape
- Coordinates: 34°09′08″S 18°53′43″E
- Purpose: Power
- Status: Operational
- Opening date: 1979
- Owner: City of Cape Town
- Operator: City of Cape Town

Dam and spillways
- Impounds: Steenbras River

Power Station
- Hydraulic head: 275 metres (902 ft)
- Turbines: 4 x 45 MW
- Installed capacity: 180 megawatts (240,000 hp)
- Annual generation: ~250 GWh

The Steenbras Power Station, also Steenbras Hydro Pump Station, is a 180 MW pumped-storage hydroelectric power station commissioned in 1979 in South Africa. The power station sits between the Steenbras Upper Dam and a small lower reservoir on the mountainside below. It acts as an energy storage system, by storing water in the upper reservoir during off-peak hours and releasing that water to generate electricity during peak hours. The City of Cape Town uses the power station for load balancing and to mitigate against loadshedding caused by the South African energy crisis. This power station is reported to be the first pumped-storage hydroelectric power station to be built on the African continent.

== Location ==
Map of the Steenbras system, including the dams and the power station.

The Steenbras Upper Dam impounds the Steenbras River at an altitude of approximately 375 metres in the Hottentots Holland Mountains, upstream of the original Steenbras Dam (which is not part of the hydroelectric scheme). The Steenbras Power Station and the scheme's lower reservoir are situated on the lower slopes of the mountain at an altitude of approximately 100 metres, close to the town of Gordon's Bay and 50 kilometres (30 mi) to the south-east of central Cape Town. A series of tunnels connects the upper reservoir to the power station.

== Operation ==
The power station is operated by the Electricity Department of the City of Cape Town. It consists of four hydroelectric turbines, each rated at 45 MW, for a total capacity of 180 MW. During peak hours, water from the upper reservoir is used to turn the turbines to generate clean energy. During off-peak hours (from 11pm until 7am), the same hardware, this time functioning as electric pumps, uses electricity purchased from the national grid to pump water from the lower reservoir back into the upper reservoir. The process is repeated, as the need arises and as hydrodynamic capacity allows.

The output of the power station is generally constrained by the 3,560 megalitres (126×10^{6} cu ft) capacity of the lower reservoir. At maximum output the station can run for about twelve hours before the lower reservoir is full; in practice it is typically run for four to five hours a day. In winter, which is the rainy season in that part of South Africa, if the upper reservoir is sufficiently full, water can be released from the lower reservoir to the Faure water treatment works instead of being pumped back up.

== See also ==
- List of power stations in South Africa
