= Spatalla mollis =

Conservation status
- Vulnerable (IUCN 3.1)

Scientific classification
- Kingdom: Plantae
- Clade: Tracheophytes
- Clade: Angiosperms
- Clade: Eudicots
- Order: Proteales
- Family: Proteaceae
- Genus: Spatalla
- Species: S. mollis

Binomial name
- Spatalla mollis R.Br.

Synonyms
- Spatalla brachyloba E.Phillips; Spatalla pilosa E.Phillips

Species of flowering plant

Spatalla mollis, the woolly spoon, is a flower-bearing shrub that belongs to the genus Spatalla and forms part of the fynbos. The plant is native to the Western Cape of South Africa.

== Description ==
The shrub is flat, rounded, grows only 80 cm (31 in) tall and flowers from July to December. The plant dies after a fire but the seeds survive. The plant is bisexual and pollinated by insects. Two months after the plant has flowered, the ripe seeds fall to the ground where they are spread by ants.

== Distribution and habitat ==
The plant occurs in the Hottentots Holland Mountains, Groenlandberg to Kleinmondberg. The plant grows in peaty soil in moist streams and river banks at elevations of 450–920 m (1,480–3,020 ft).

== External references ==
- Threatened Species Programme | SANBI Red List of South African Plants
- Woolly Unispoon
- Spatalla mollis R.Br.
- Spatalla mollis R.Br. 1810 bl 100
