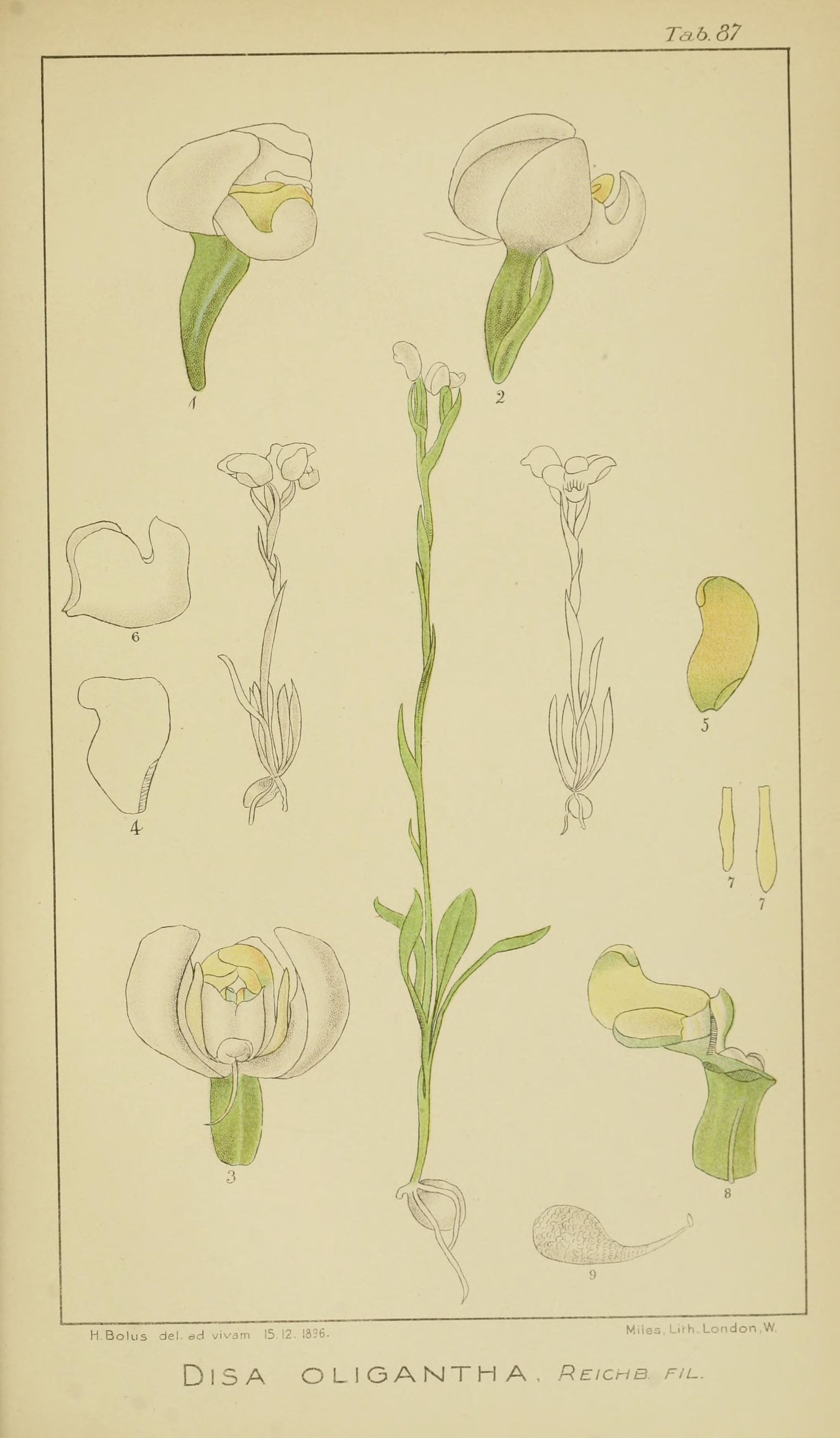

Scientific classification
- Kingdom: Plantae
- Clade: Tracheophytes
- Clade: Angiosperms
- Clade: Monocots
- Order: Asparagales
- Family: Orchidaceae
- Subfamily: Orchidoideae
- Genus: Disa
- Species: D. oligantha

Binomial name
- Disa oligantha Rchb.f.

Synonyms
- Disa parvilabris Bolus; Orthopenthea triloba (Sond.) Rolfe; Penthea triloba Sond.

= Disa oligantha =

Species of flowering plant

Disa oligantha is a perennial plant and geophyte belonging to the genus Disa and is part of the fynbos. The plant is endemic to the Western Cape and occurs on the peaks of the Table Mountain and Hottentots Holland Mountains. There are five subpopulations. The plant is considered rare.
