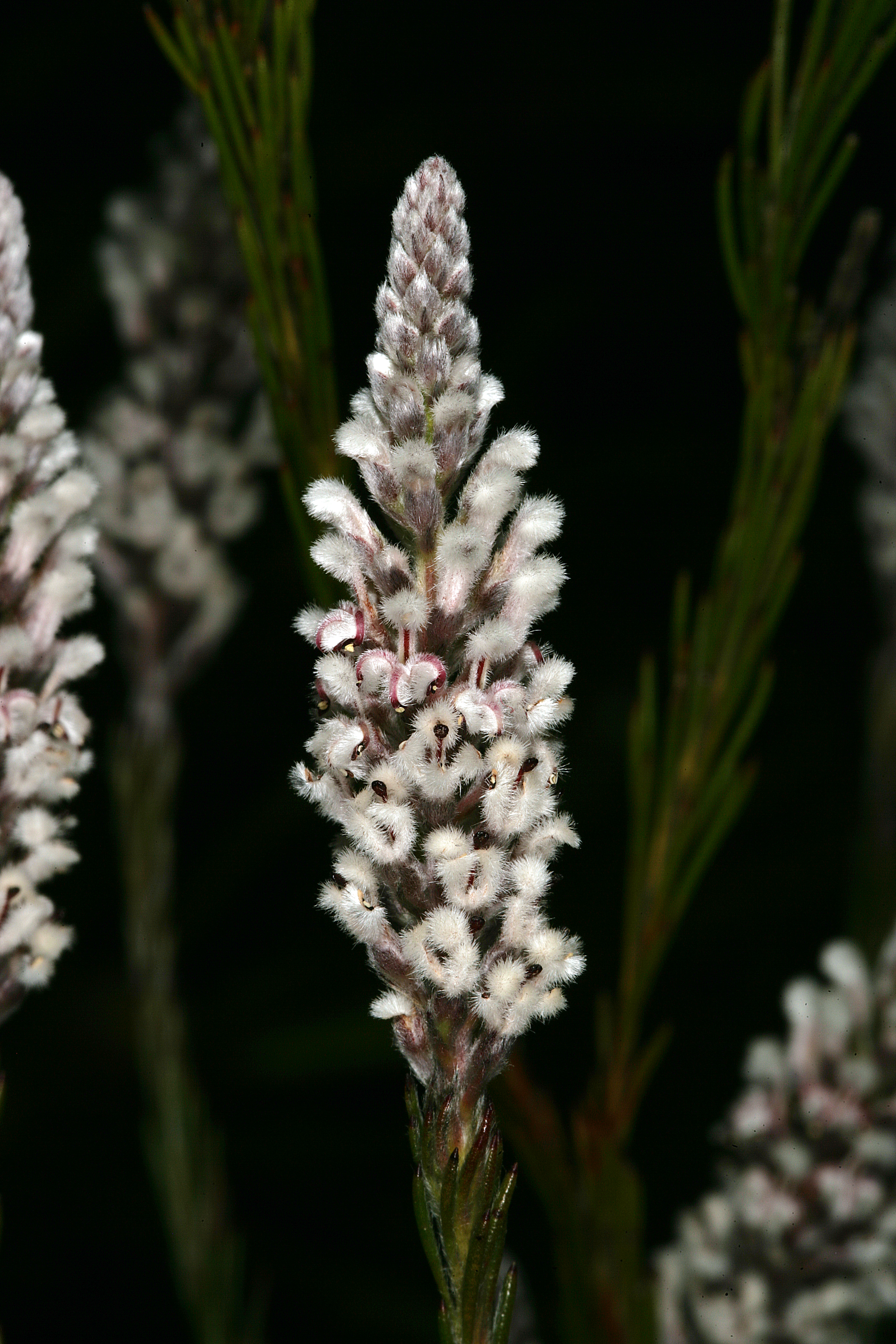

Conservation status
- Vulnerable (IUCN 3.1)

Scientific classification
- Kingdom: Plantae
- Clade: Tracheophytes
- Clade: Angiosperms
- Clade: Eudicots
- Order: Proteales
- Family: Proteaceae
- Genus: Spatalla
- Species: S. propinqua

Binomial name
- Spatalla propinqua R.Br.

Synonyms
- Protea australis Poir.; Spatallopsis propinqua (R.Br.) E.Phillips

= Spatalla propinqua =

Species of plant

Spatalla propinqua, the lax spoon, is a flower-bearing shrub belonging to genus Spatalla, and forming a part of the fynbos vegetation. The plant is native to the Western Cape of South Africa.

== Description ==
The shrub grows 1.0 m (3.3 ft) tall, grows upright and flowers mainly from June to March. Fire destroys the plant but the seeds survive. The plant is bisexual and pollinated by insects. The fruit ripens two months after the plant has flowered, and the seeds fall to the ground where they are spread by ants.

== Distribution and habitat ==
The plant occurs from the Slanghoek Mountains to the Riviersonderend Mountains. It grows in swampy, cool southern slopes at elevations of 200–620 m (660–2,030 ft).
