= Spatalla salsoloides =

Conservation status
- Endangered (IUCN 3.1).

Scientific classification
- Kingdom: Plantae
- Clade: Tracheophytes
- Clade: Angiosperms
- Clade: Eudicots
- Order: Proteales
- Family: Proteaceae
- Genus: Spatalla
- Species: S. salsoloides

Binomial name
- Spatalla salsoloides (R.Br.) Rourke (1969)

Synonyms
- Protea salsoloides (R.Br.) Poir. (1816); Soranthe salsoloides (R.Br.) Kuntze (1891); Sorocephalus salsoloides R.Br. (1810)

Species of plant

Spatalla salsoloides, the kink-style spoon, is a flower-bearing shrub that belongs to the genus Spatalla and forms part of the fynbos. The plant is endemic to the Western Cape of South Africa, where it occurs in the Du Toitskloofberge's peak and Goudini Sneeukop.

The shrub is bushy and grows to 1.0 m in height and diameter and flowers from October to December. The plant dies after a fire but the seeds survive. The plant is bisexual and pollination takes place through the action of insects. Two months after the plant has flowered, the ripe seeds fall to the ground where they are spread by ants. The plant grows in ratty southern slope at elevations of 1500 – 1850 m.

== Sources ==
- REDLIST Sanbi
- Biodiversityexplorer
- Protea Atlas
- Protea Atlas, bl. 88
- Plants of the World Online
