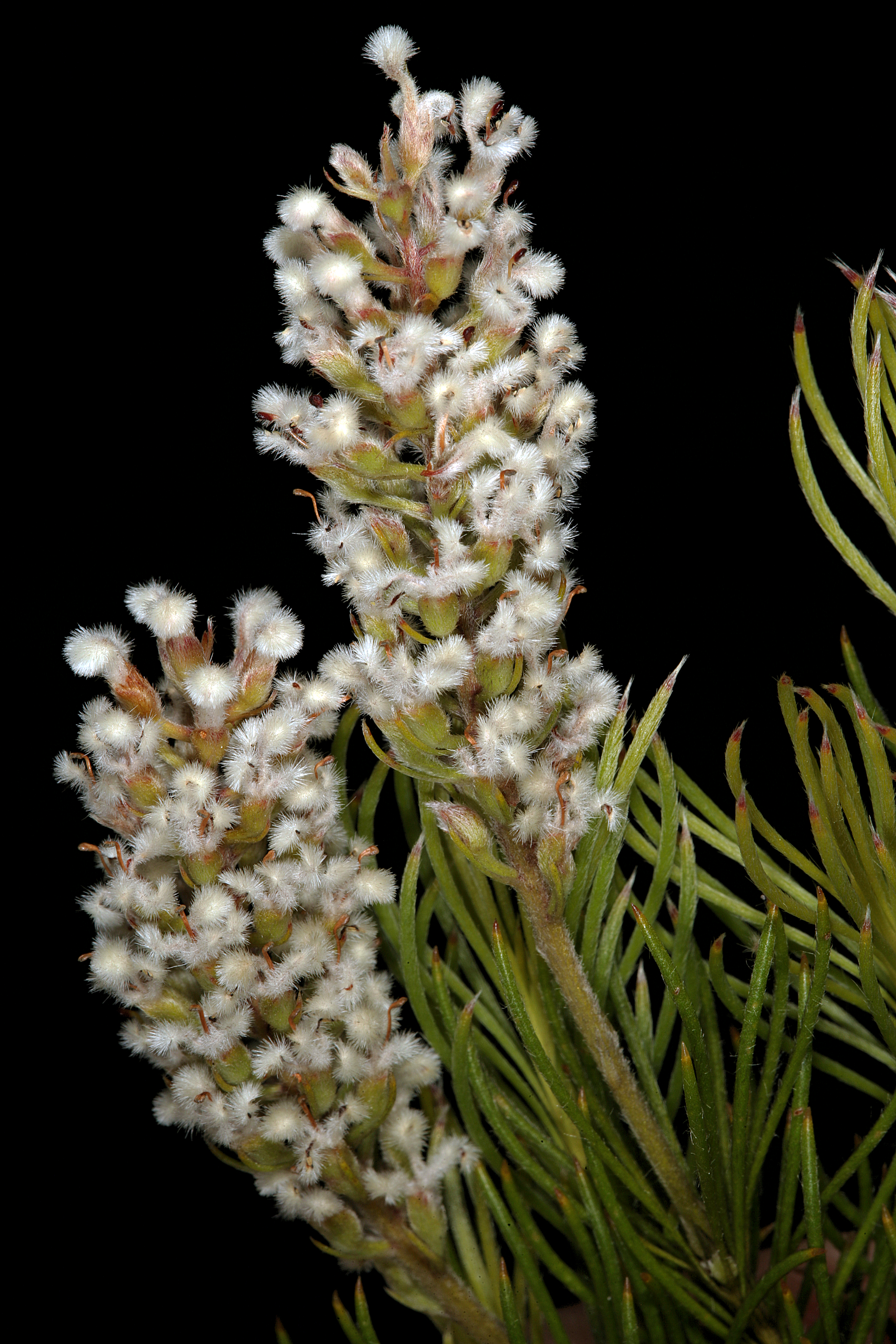

Conservation status
- Near Threatened (IUCN 3.1)

Scientific classification
- Kingdom: Plantae
- Clade: Tracheophytes
- Clade: Angiosperms
- Clade: Eudicots
- Order: Proteales
- Family: Proteaceae
- Genus: Spatalla
- Species: S. curvifolia

Binomial name
- Spatalla curvifolia Salisb. ex Knight

Synonyms
- Protea pedunculata (R.Br.) Poir.; Spatalla abietina Roem. & Schult.; Spatalla galpinii E.Phillips; Spatalla pedunculata R.Br.

= Spatalla curvifolia =

Species of flowering plant

Spatalla curvifolia, the white-stalked spoon, is a flower-bearing shrub that forms part of the fynbos. The plant is native to the Western Cape of South Africa.

== Description ==
The shrub is flat and rounded, grows only 80 cm (31 in) tall and flowers all year round. The plant dies after a fire, but the seeds survive. The plant is bisexual and pollinated by insects. Two months after the plant has flowered, the ripe seeds fall to the ground, where they are spread by ants.

== Distribution and habitat ==
The plant occurs from Kogelberg to Bredasdorp. It grows in sandy soil at elevations of 0–350 m (0–1,148 ft).
