= Spatalla setacea =

Conservation status
- Near Threatened (IUCN 3.1).

Scientific classification
- Kingdom: Plantae
- Clade: Tracheophytes
- Clade: Angiosperms
- Clade: Eudicots
- Order: Proteales
- Family: Proteaceae
- Genus: Spatalla
- Species: S. setacea

Binomial name
- Spatalla setacea (R.Br.) Rourke, (1969)

Species of plant

Spatalla setacea, the needle-leaf spoon is a flower-bearing shrub that belongs to the genus Spatalla and forms part of the fynbos. The plant is endemic to the Western Cape of South Africa where it occurs from Slanghoek to the Hottentots-Hollandberge.

The shrub grows upright and reaches a height of only 1.0 m and flowers from October to December. The plant dies after a fire, but the seeds survive. The plant is bisexual and pollination takes place through the action of insects. Two months after the plant has flowered, the ripe seeds fall to the ground where they are spread by ants. The plant grows in peaty soil on a southern slope at elevations of 900 – 1250 m.

== Sources ==
- REDLIST Sanbi
- Biodiversityexplorer
- Protea Atlas
- Protea Atlas, bl. 90
- Plants of the World Online
