= Spatalla tulbaghensis =

Conservation status
- Endangered (IUCN 3.1)

Scientific classification
- Kingdom: Plantae
- Clade: Tracheophytes
- Clade: Angiosperms
- Clade: Eudicots
- Order: Proteales
- Family: Proteaceae
- Genus: Spatalla
- Species: S. tulbaghensis

Binomial name
- Spatalla tulbaghensis (E.Phillips) Rourke

Synonyms
- Sorocephalus tulbaghensis E.Phillips

Species of flowering plant

Spatalla tulbaghensis, the shaggy-hair spoon, is a flowering shrub belonging to the genus Spatalla and forms part of the fynbos. The plant is native to the Western Cape where it occurs on the Witzenberg Plains and Skurweberg Pass.

The shrub is flat, rounded, grows only 50 cm tall and flowers from September to December. The plant dies after a fire but the seeds survive. The plant is bisexual and pollination takes place through the action of insects. Two months after the plant has flowered, the ripe seeds fall to the ground where they are spread by ants. The plant grows in moist, coarse sandy plains at altitudes of 910 m.
