= Spatalla colorata =

Conservation status
- Endangered (IUCN 3.1)

Scientific classification
- Kingdom: Plantae
- Clade: Tracheophytes
- Clade: Angiosperms
- Clade: Eudicots
- Order: Proteales
- Family: Proteaceae
- Genus: Spatalla
- Species: S. colorata

Binomial name
- Spatalla colorata Meisn.

Species of plant

Spatalla colorata, the shiny spoon, is a flower-bearing shrub that belongs to the genus Spatalla and forms part of the fynbos. The plant is native to the Western Cape Province of South Africa, where it occurs from the Riviersonderend Mountains to central Langeberg.

The shrub grows upright and grows only 80 cm tall and flowers from July to November. The plant dies after a fire but the seeds survive. The plant is bisexual and pollination takes place through the action of insects. Two months after the plant has flowered, the ripe seeds fall to the ground where they are spread by ants. The plant grows on cool, southern slopes at elevations of 900 – 1400 m.
