= Steenbras Dam =

Dam near Gordon's Bay, Western Cape, South Africa

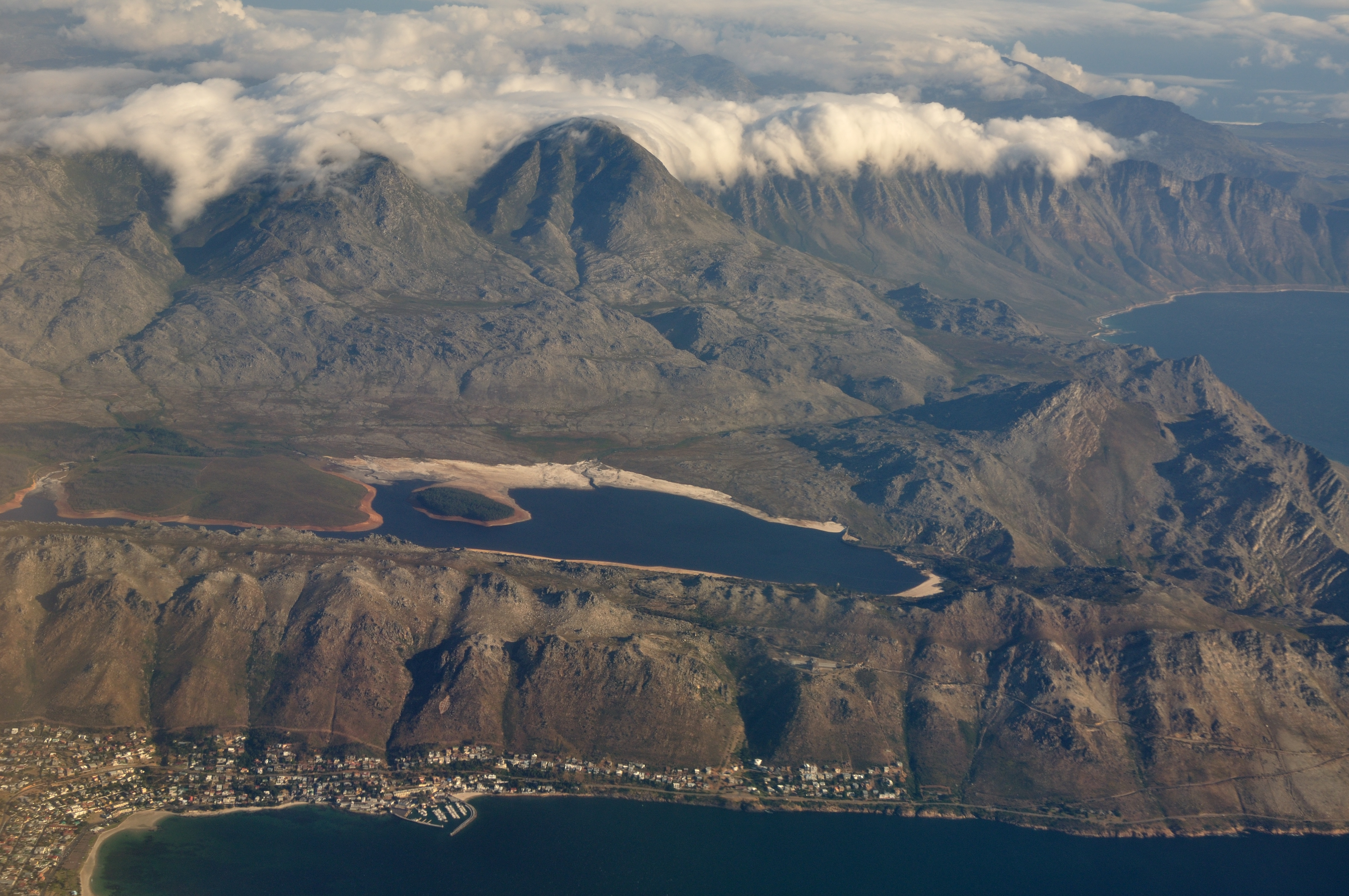
- Steenbras Dam, seen wedged between the Hottentots-Holland and Kogelberg ranges (top), with False Bay below and right

- Location within South Africa Location within Western Cape
- Official name: Steenbras Lower Dam
- Country: South Africa
- Location: Western Cape, Gordon's Bay
- Coordinates: 34°11′12.61″S 18°51′9.11″E
- Purpose: Water supply
- Opening date: 1921 (renovated 1989)
- Owner: City of Cape Town

Dam and spillways
- Type of dam: Arch-gravity dam
- Impounds: Steenbras River
- Height: 28 m (92 ft)
- Length: 412 m (1,352 ft)

Reservoir
- Creates: Steenbras Dam
- Total capacity: 36,133 Ml (1,276.0×10^{6} cu ft)
- Catchment area: 66.7 km^{2} (25.8 sq mi)
- Surface area: 380 ha (940 acres)

The Steenbras Dam ("STEE-un bruss"), now referred to as Steenbras Lower Dam, is a gravity concrete arch type dam located in the Hottentots-Holland mountains, above Gordons Bay, near Cape Town in South Africa. It is one of the six large dams that make up the Western Cape Water Supply System. It is owned by the City of Cape Town and serves principally to supply water to that city. The dam wall is 28 metres (92 ft) high and 412 metres (1,352 ft) long; it impounds a reservoir of 36,133 megalitres (1,276.0×10^{6} cu ft) over a surface area of 380 hectares (940 acres) when full.

In 1916 a Board of Engineers was appointed to report on a water augmentation scheme for the City of Cape Town. Their proposal was the Steenbras scheme which would consist of a concrete gravity and arch dam on the Steenbras River. This dam would be connected to the Molteno reservoir through a tunnel in the Hottentots Holland mountains and a 64 kilometre long cast iron pipeline. Work began on the scheme in 1918 and was completed three years later. The Steenbras scheme could supply Cape Town with up to 42 million litres of water per day although the average consumption was in the region of 29 million litres per day. The consumption however grew rapidly and it was not long before Cape Town once again had a water supply problem. To solve the demand for additional water supplies the Steenbras dam wall was raised and an additional pipeline was laid into the city. This work was completed in 1928. For much of the first half of the twentieth century it was the main reservoir for Cape Town but is now only one of many dams that supply the city. The hazard potential of Steenbras has been ranked high (3).

Map of the Steenbras Dams and their catchment area

The dam is on the Steenbras River, which, in common with most rivers in the Western Cape, has a low sediment load and delivers water of very high quality. The river and dam are named after the steenbras, a fish endemic to South Africa.

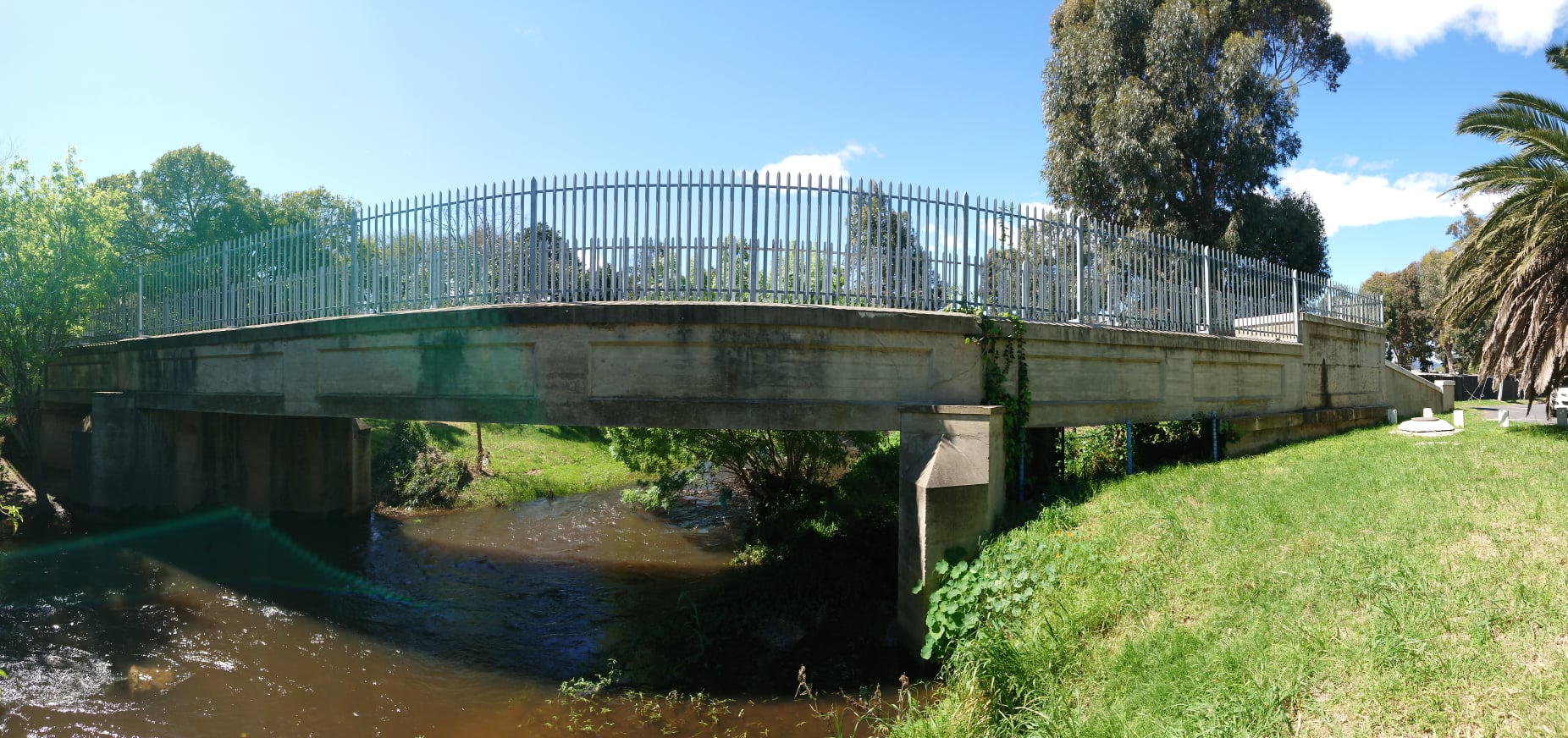
Pipeline from Steenbras crossing the Lourensford River in Somerset West

In 1977 the Steenbras Upper Dam was constructed directly upstream. It is used for the Steenbras pumped-storage hydroelectricity scheme which supplements Cape Town's electricity supply during periods of peak demand.

The City of Cape Town is investigating strengthening and raising the wall to increase Steenbras Dam's capacity.
