= Spatalla squamata =

Conservation status
- Near Threatened (IUCN 3.1).

Scientific classification
- Kingdom: Plantae
- Clade: Tracheophytes
- Clade: Angiosperms
- Clade: Eudicots
- Order: Proteales
- Family: Proteaceae
- Genus: Spatalla
- Species: S. squamata

Binomial name
- Spatalla squamata Meisn. (1856)

Species of plant

Spatalla squamata the silky spoon is a flower-bearing shrub that belongs to the genus Spatalla and forms part of the fynbos. The plant is endemic to the Western Cape of South Africa, where it occurs in the Bredasdorp Mountains and Agulhas Plain.

The shrub grows upright and is only 50 cm high and flowers from August to October. The plant dies after a fire but the seeds survive. The plant is hermaphroditic and pollination takes place through the action of insects. Two months after the plant has flowered, the ripe seeds fall to the ground where they are spread by ants. The plant grows in sandstone sand and on hills at elevations of 30 – 460 m.

== Sources ==
- REDLIST Sanbi
- Biodiversityexplorer
- Protea Atlas
- Protea Atlas, bl. 94
- Plants of the World Online
