= Spatalla incurva =

Conservation status
- Least Concern (IUCN 3.1).

Scientific classification
- Kingdom: Plantae
- Clade: Tracheophytes
- Clade: Angiosperms
- Clade: Eudicots
- Order: Proteales
- Family: Proteaceae
- Genus: Spatalla
- Species: S. incurva

Binomial name
- Spatalla incurva (Thunb.) R.Br. (1810)

Synonyms
- Protea incurva Thunb. (1781); Spatalla mucronifolia E.Phillips (1910); Spatalla nana Knight in Cult. Prot.: 76 (1809); Spatalla procera Knight (1809), nom. superfl.; Spatalla wallichii E.Phillips (1910)

Species of flowering plant

Spatalla incurva, the swan-head spoon is a flowering shrub that belongs to the genus Spatalla and forms part of the fynbos. The plant is endemic to the Western Cape of South Africa where it occurs in the Cederberg up to the Hottentots Hollandberge, Swartberg and Kammanassieberge.

The shrub grows to 1.0 m tall, tends to spread and flowers mainly from November to December. Fire destroys the plant but the seeds survive. The plant is bisexual and pollination takes place through the action of insects. Two months after the plant has flowered, the fruit ripens and the seeds fall to the ground where they are spread by ants. The plant grows in rock crevices on mountain tops at elevations of 1,350 - 2,300 m.

== Sources ==
- REDLIST Sanbi
- Biodiversityexplorer
- Protea Atlas 1
- bl. 70 Protea Atlas 1
- Plants of the World Online
