= Spatalla nubicola =

Conservation status
- Vulnerable (IUCN 3.1)

Scientific classification
- Kingdom: Plantae
- Clade: Tracheophytes
- Clade: Angiosperms
- Clade: Eudicots
- Order: Proteales
- Family: Proteaceae
- Genus: Spatalla
- Species: S. nubicola

Binomial name
- Spatalla nubicola Rourke

Species of flowering plant

Spatalla nubicola, the Medusa spoon, is a flower-bearing shrub that belongs to the genus Spatalla and forms part of the fynbos. The plant is native to the Western Cape of South Africa where it is found in the central Langeberg near the town of Heidelberg.

The shrub (rounded or erect) grows up to 1.5 m tall and flowers from September to December. The plant dies after a fire but the seeds survive. The plant is bisexual and pollination takes place through the action of insects. Two months after the plant has flowered, the ripe seeds fall to the ground where they are spread by ants. The plant grows on the upper, southern slopes in peaty soil at 1600 m.
