= Spatalla thyrsiflora =

Conservation status
- Vulnerable (IUCN 3.1).

Scientific classification
- Kingdom: Plantae
- Clade: Tracheophytes
- Clade: Angiosperms
- Clade: Eudicots
- Order: Proteales
- Family: Proteaceae
- Genus: Spatalla
- Species: S. thyrsiflora

Binomial name
- Spatalla thyrsiflora Salisb. ex Knight (1809)

Species of plant

Spatalla thyrsiflora, the swan-neck spoon, is a flowering shrub that belongs to the genus Spatalla and forms part of the fynbos. The plant is endemic to the Western Cape of South Africa where it occurs in the Du Toitskloofberge, Louwshoekberg and in the Swartberg at Caledon.

The shrub spreads to 1.5 m in diameter and flowers from August to December. The shrub sprouts again after it has burned. The plant is bisexual and pollination takes place through the action of insects. Two months after the plant has flowered, the fruit ripens and the seeds fall to the ground where they are spread by ants. The plant grows in sandstone and granite soil at elevations of 900 – 1500 m.

== Sources ==
- REDLIST Sanbi
- Biodiversityexplorer
- Protea Atlas
- Protea Atlas, bl 74
- Plants of the World Online
