= Spatalla argentea =

Conservation status
- Endangered (IUCN 3.1)

Scientific classification
- Kingdom: Plantae
- Clade: Tracheophytes
- Clade: Angiosperms
- Clade: Eudicots
- Order: Proteales
- Family: Proteaceae
- Genus: Spatalla
- Species: S. argentea

Binomial name
- Spatalla argentea Rourke

Species of flowering plant

Spatalla argentea, the silver-leaf spoon, is a flower-bearing shrub that belongs to the genus Spatalla and forms part of the fynbos. The plant is endemic to the Western Cape Province of South Africa.

== Description ==
The shrub grows only 80 cm (31 in) tall and flowers from October to January. The plant is destroyed in a fire but the seeds survive. The plant is bisexual and pollinated by insects. The fruit ripens two months after the plant has flowered, and the seeds fall to the ground where they are spread by ants.

== Distribution and habitat ==
The plant occurs in the Riviersonderend Mountains from Wolfieskop to Jonaskop. It grows in sandy soil between rocks at elevations of 475–1,350 m (1,558–4,429 ft)
