= Spatalla ericoides =

Conservation status
- Endangered (IUCN 3.1)

Scientific classification
- Kingdom: Plantae
- Clade: Tracheophytes
- Clade: Angiosperms
- Clade: Eudicots
- Order: Proteales
- Family: Proteaceae
- Genus: Spatalla
- Species: S. ericoides

Binomial name
- Spatalla ericoides E.Phillips, (1910)

Species of flowering plant

Spatalla ericoides the Erica-leaved spoon is a flower-bearing shrub that belongs to the genus Spatalla and forms part of the fynbos. The plant is endemic to the Western Cape of South Africa where it occurs on the Agulhas Plain near Pearly Beach, Hagelkraal and Klein Hagelkraal.

The shrub is flat, rounded, grows only 80 cm high and flowers from August to September. The plant dies after a fire but the seeds survive. The plant is bisexual and pollination takes place through the action of insects. Two months after the plant has flowered, the ripe seeds fall to the ground where they are spread by ants. The plant grows in a limestone sand at elevations of 10 – 250 m.
