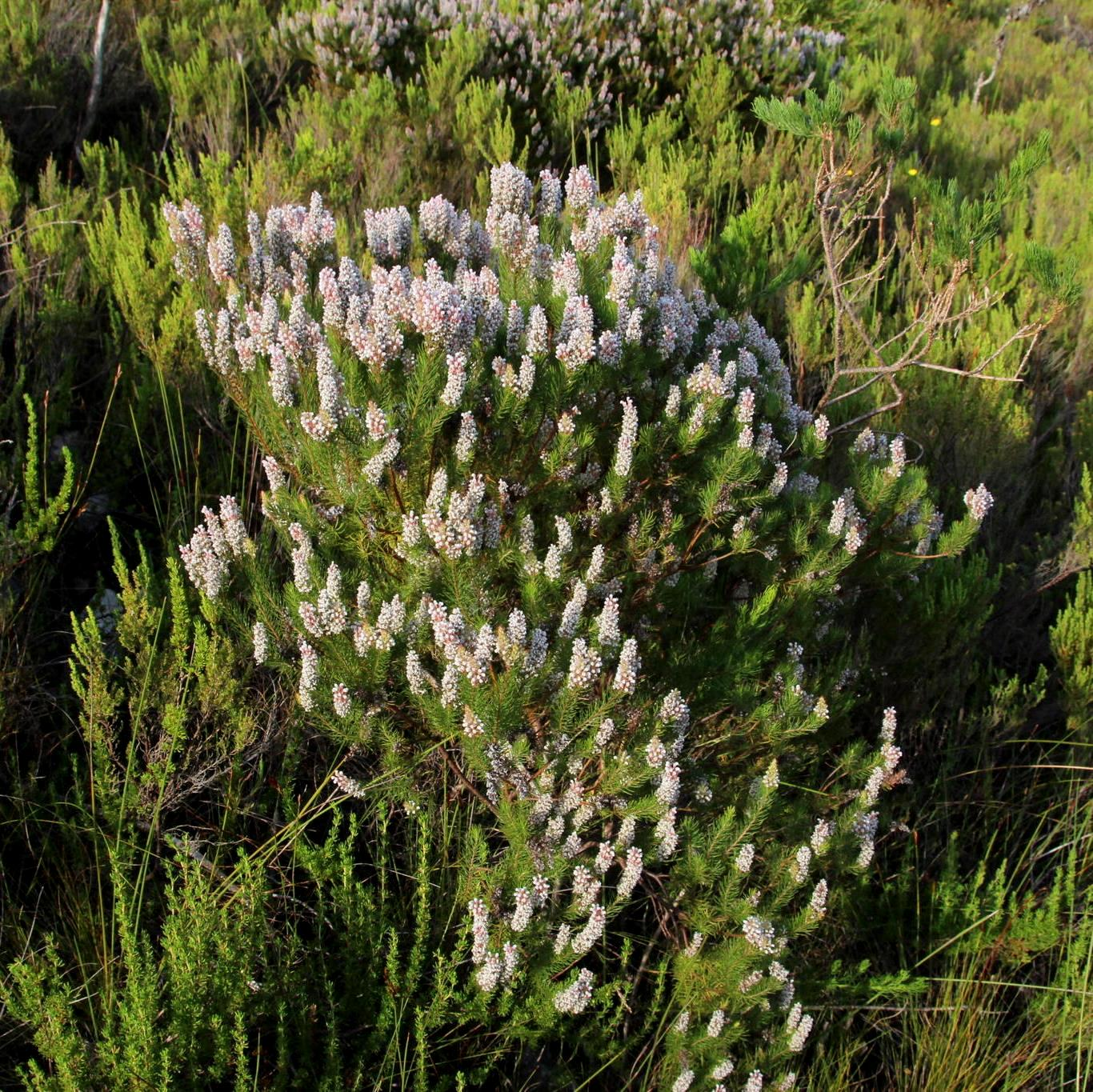
- Spatalla parilis

Scientific classification
- Kingdom: Plantae
- Clade: Tracheophytes
- Clade: Angiosperms
- Clade: Eudicots
- Order: Proteales
- Family: Proteaceae
- Subfamily: Proteoideae
- Tribe: Leucadendreae
- Subtribe: Leucadendrinae
- Genus: Spatalla; Salisb., 1807

Synonyms
- Spatallopsis Phillips, 1910

= Spatalla =

Genus of plants endemic to South Africa

Spatalla is a genus containing 20 species of flowering plants, commonly known as "spoons", in the family Proteaceae. The genus is endemic to the Cape Floristic Region of South Africa where it is associated with fynbos habitats. The species are all small shrubs. The name is derived from the Greek, meaning “wantonness”, alluding to the plants’ unusually large pollen-presenters. Most species are threatened.

== Species ==
Described species are listed below, with their conservation status:

- Spatalla argentea Rourke – Silver-leaf spoon – EN
- Spatalla barbigera Salisb. ex Knight – Fine-leaf spoon – NT
- Spatalla caudata (Thunb.) R.Br. – Woolly-hair spoon – EN
- Spatalla colorata Meisn. – Shiny spoon – EN
- Spatalla confusa (E.Phillips) Rourke – Long-tube spoon – LC
- Spatalla curvifolia Salisb. ex Knight – White-stalked spoon – NT
- Spatalla ericoides E.Phillips – Erica-leaf spoon – EN
- Spatalla incurva (Thunb.) R.Br. – Swan-head spoon – LC
- Spatalla longifolia Salisb. ex Knight – Pink-stalked spoon – NT
- Spatalla mollis R.Br. – Woolly spoon – Rare
- Spatalla nubicola Rourke – Medusa spoon – NT
- Spatalla parilis Salisb. ex Knight – Spike spoon – LC
- Spatalla prolifera (Thunb.) Salisb. ex Knight – Palmiet spoon – EN
- Spatalla propinqua R.Br. – Lax spoon – EN
- Spatalla racemosa (L.) Druce – Lax-stalked spoon – NT
- Spatalla salsoloides (R.Br.) Rourke – Kink-style spoon – CR
- Spatalla setacea (R.Br.) Rourke – Needle-leaf spoon – LC
- Spatalla squamata Meisn. – Silky spoon – NT
- Spatalla thyrsiflora Salisb. ex Knight – Swan-neck spoon – VU
- Spatalla tulbaghensis (E.Phillips) Rourke – Shaggy-hair spoon – EN

== Gallery ==
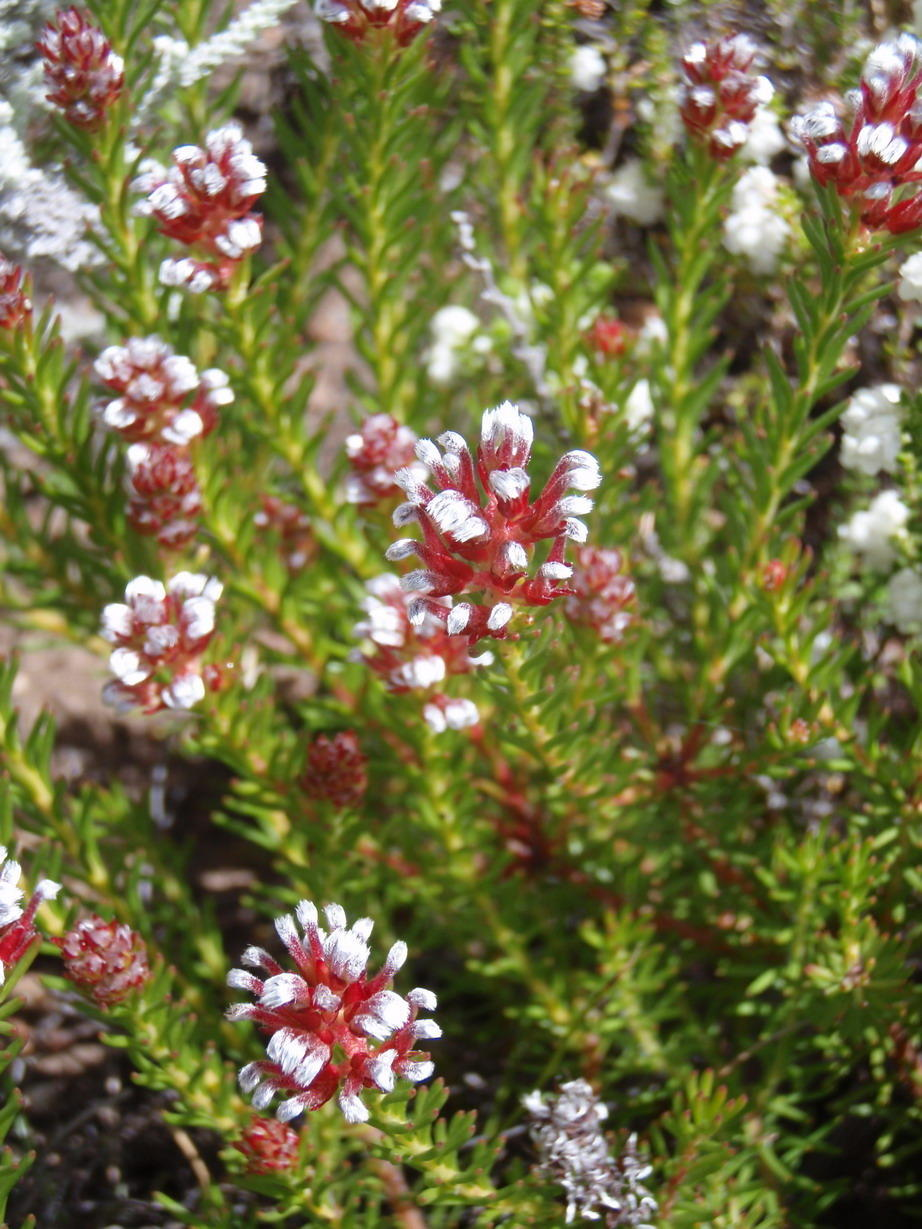
Spatalla confusa

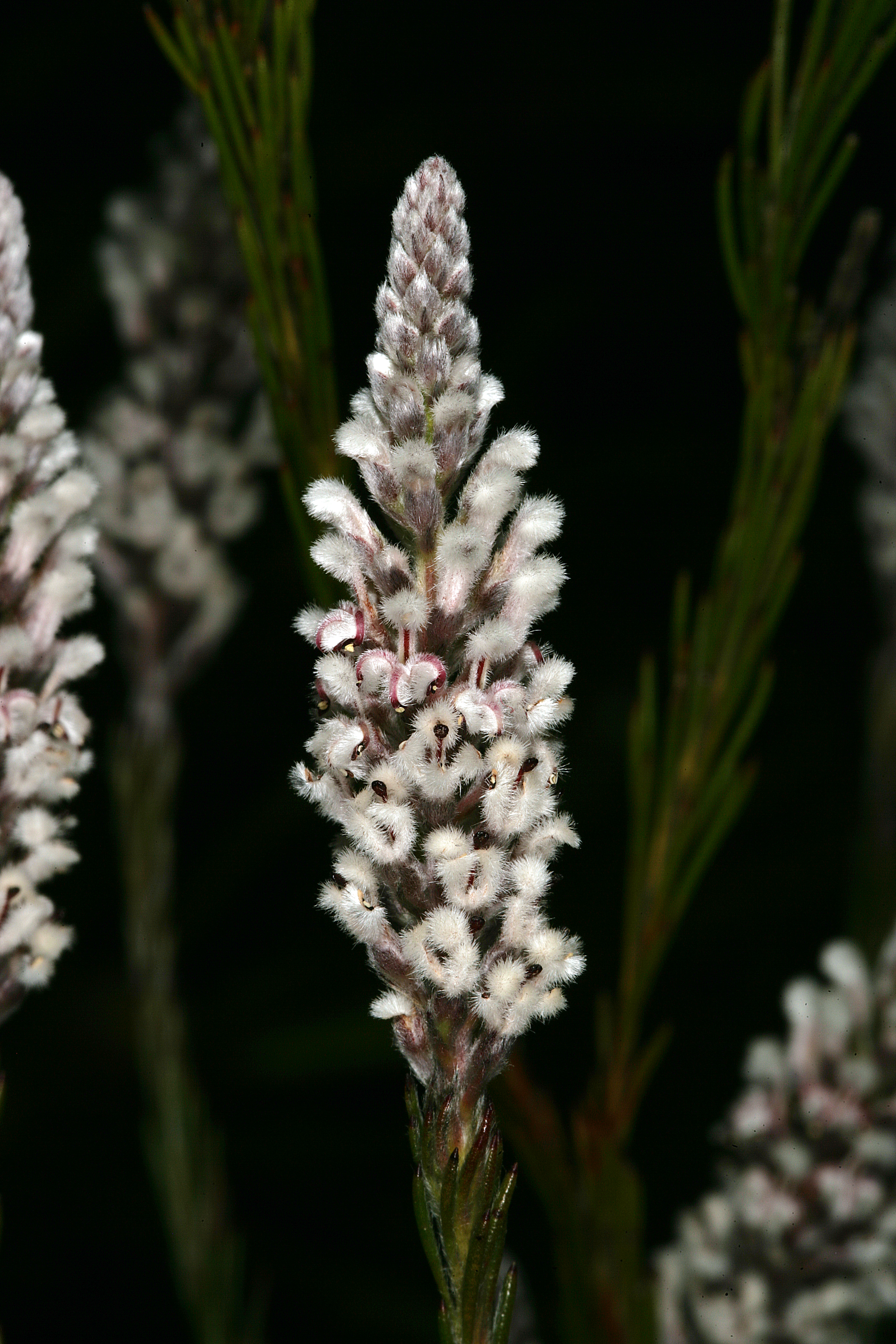
Spatalla propinqua

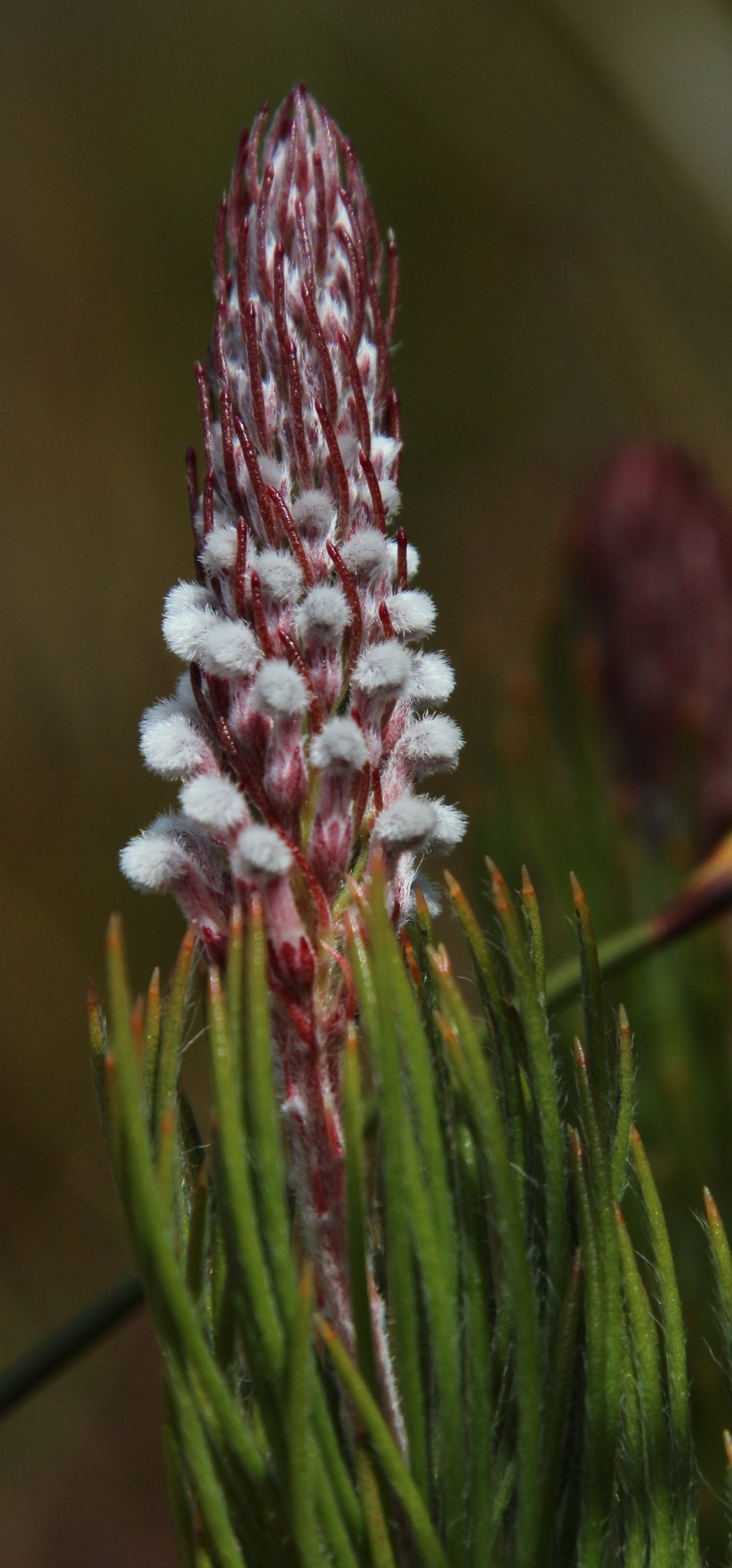
Spatalla longifolia

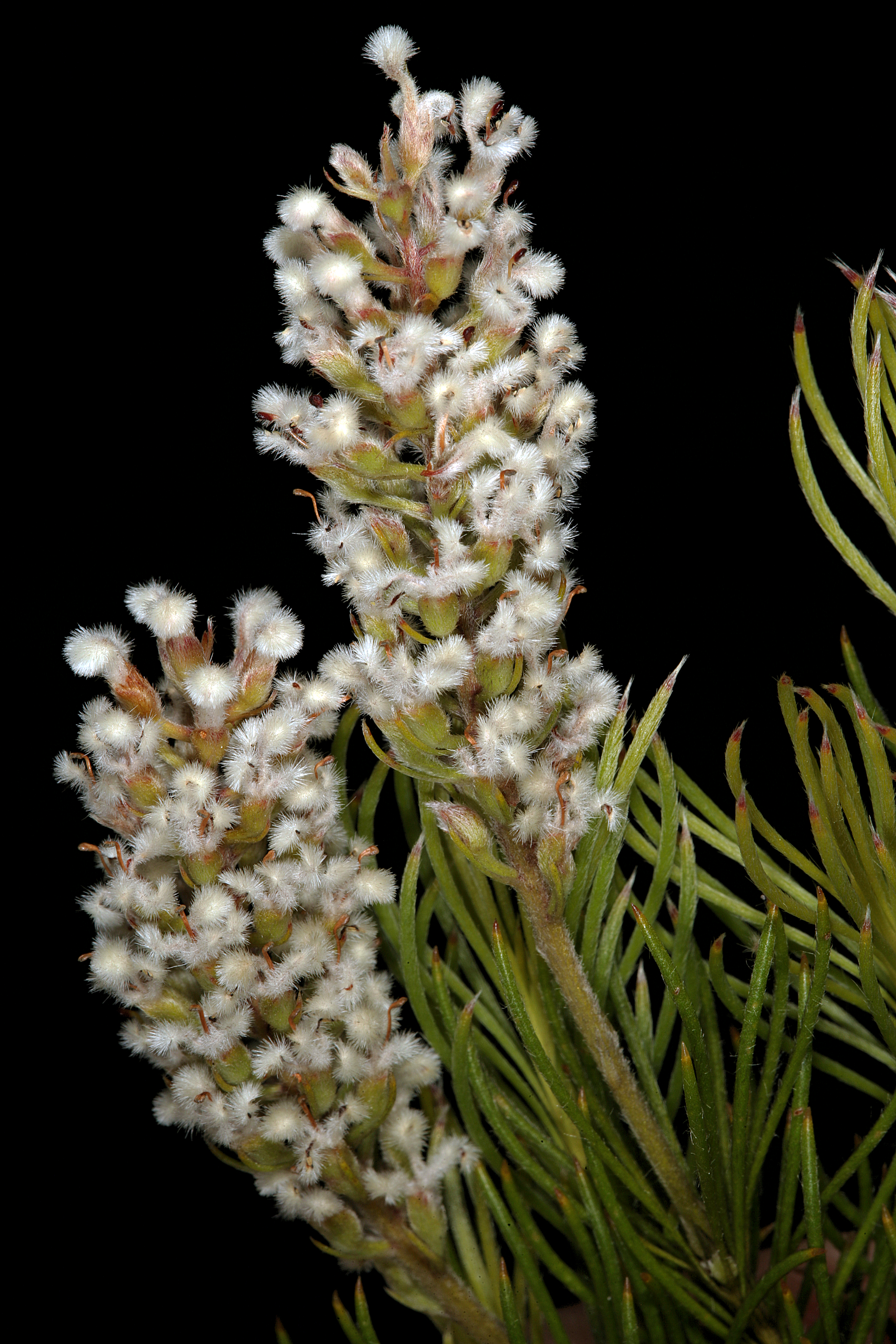
Spatalla curvifolia

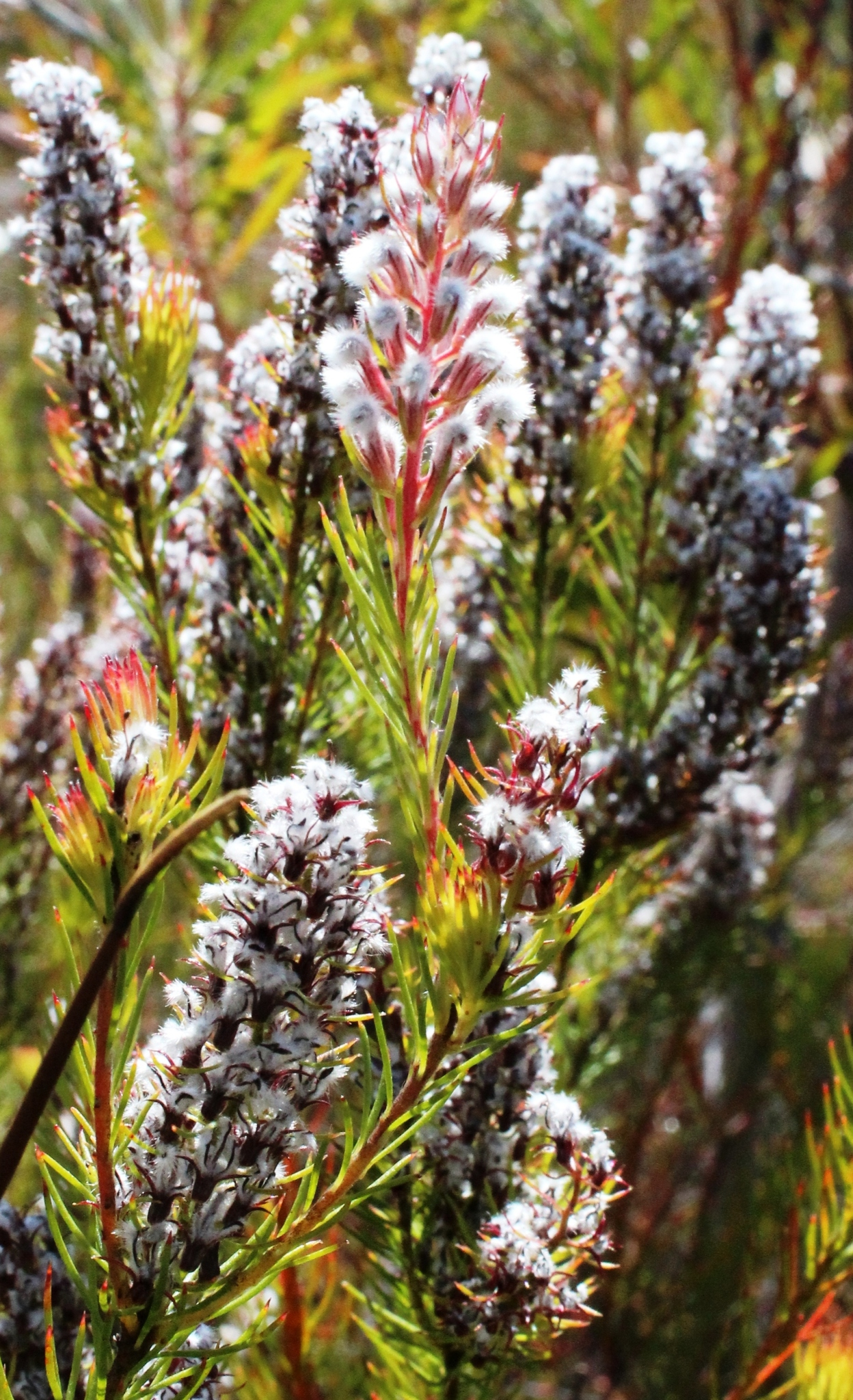
Spatalla parilis

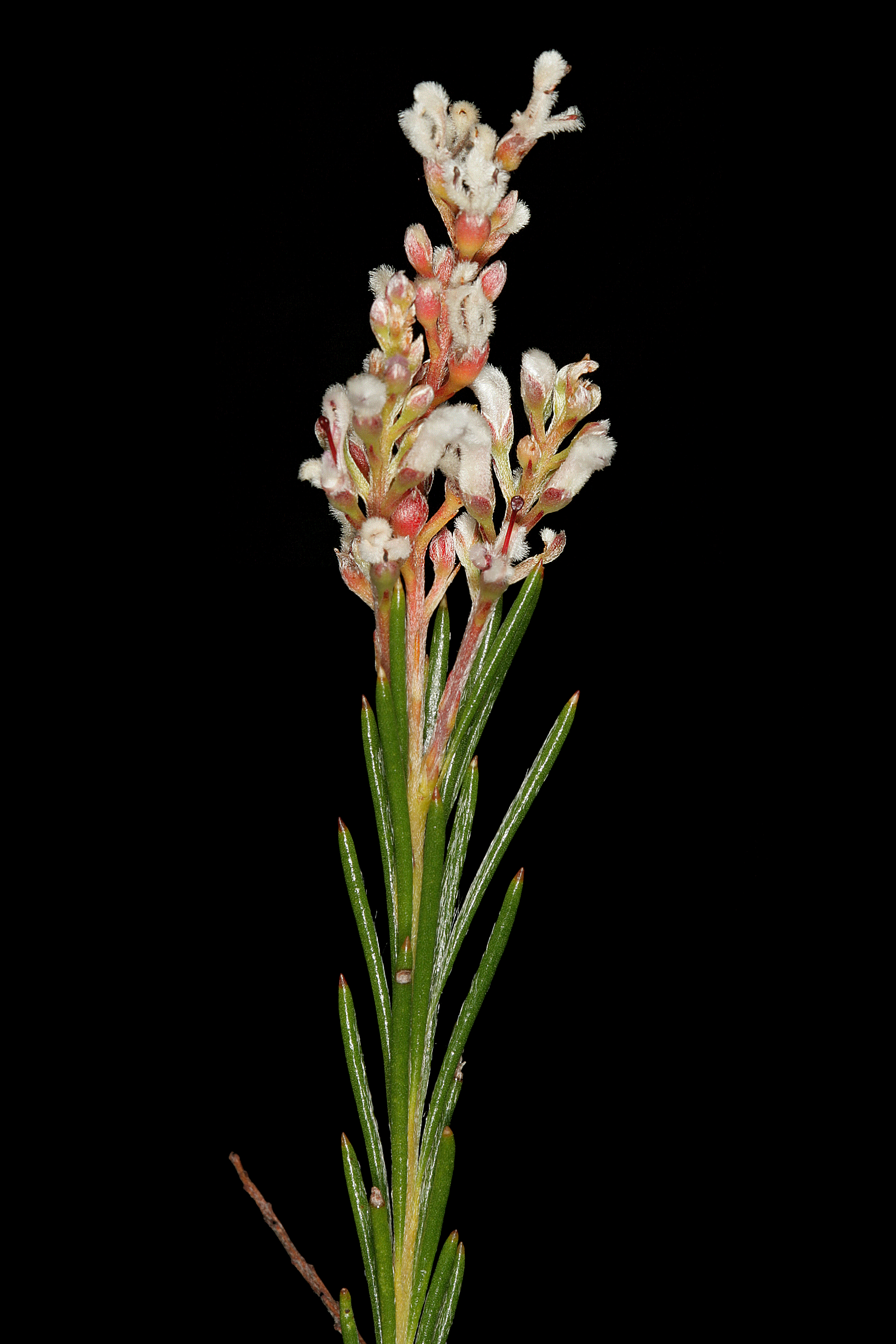
Spatalla racemosa
