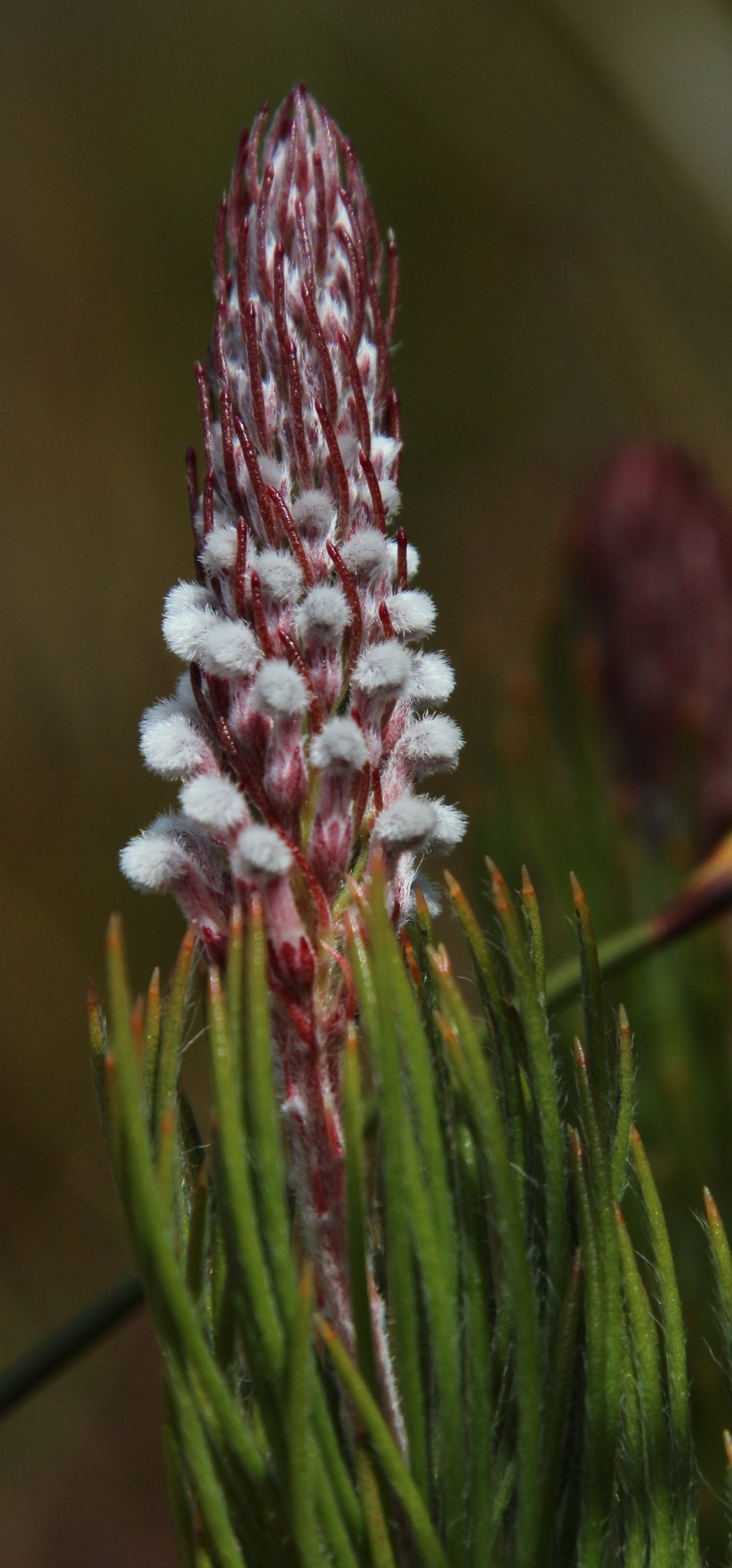

Conservation status
- Endangered (IUCN 3.1)

Scientific classification
- Kingdom: Plantae
- Clade: Tracheophytes
- Clade: Angiosperms
- Clade: Eudicots
- Order: Proteales
- Family: Proteaceae
- Genus: Spatalla
- Species: S. longifolia

Binomial name
- Spatalla longifolia Salisb. ex Knight

Synonyms
- Protea nivea (R.Br.) Poir.; Spatalla nivea R.Br.

= Spatalla longifolia =

Species of flowering plant

Spatalla longifolia, the pink-stalked spoon, is a flower-bearing shrub that belongs to the genus Spatalla. It forms a part of the fynbos. The plant is native to the Western Cape of South Africa where it is found in the Hottentots-Holland Mountains; from Franschhoek and Villiersdorp to the Kleinmond Mountains.

The shrub grows erect and 1 m tall and flowers from August to November. The plant dies after a fire but the seeds survive. The plant is bisexual and is pollinated by insects. Two months after the plant has flowered, the ripe seeds fall to the ground where they are spread by ants. The plant grows on rocky slopes in sandstone soil at elevations of 300 - 915 m.
