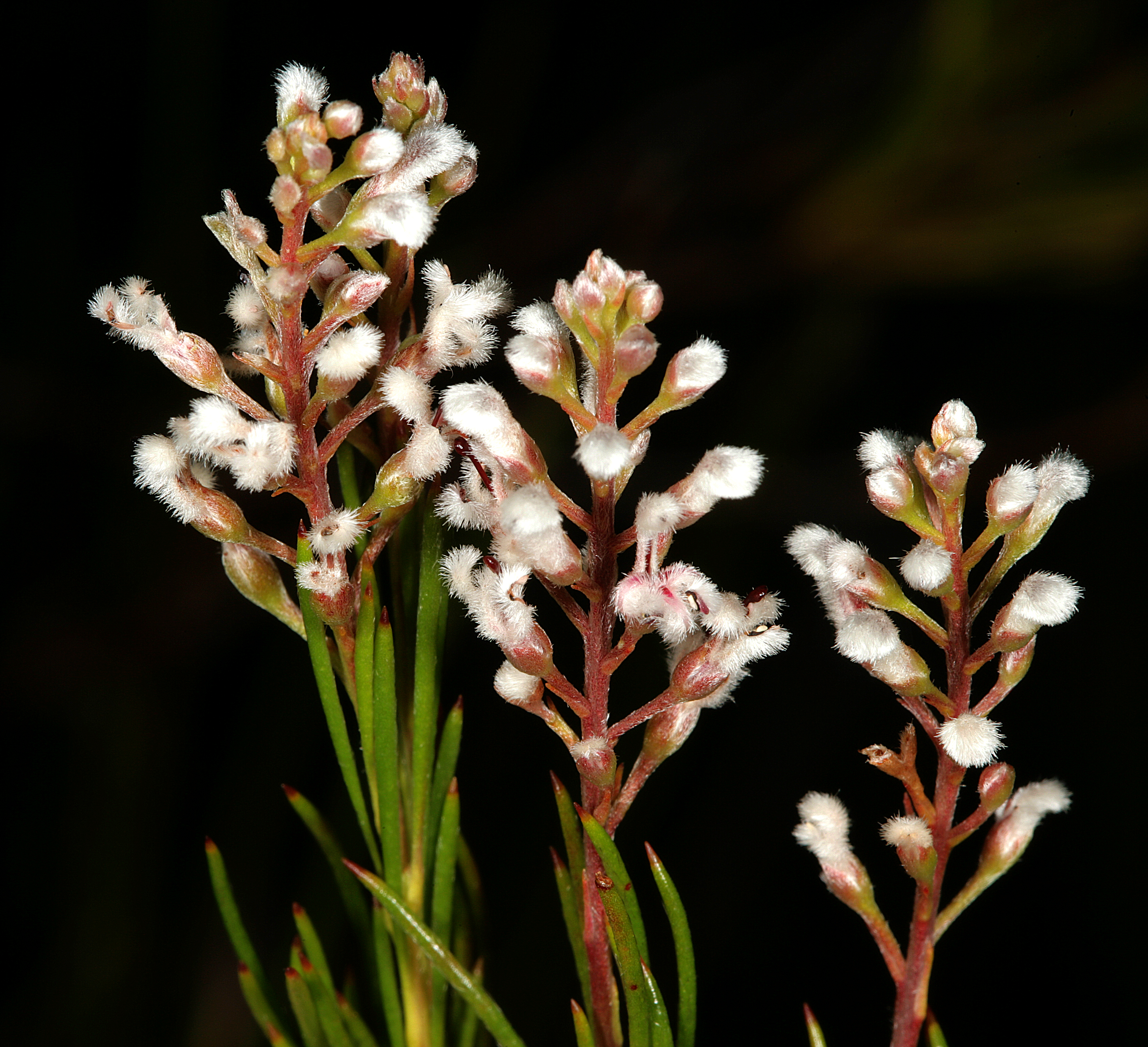

Conservation status
- Near Threatened (IUCN 3.1)

Scientific classification
- Kingdom: Plantae
- Clade: Tracheophytes
- Clade: Angiosperms
- Clade: Eudicots
- Order: Proteales
- Family: Proteaceae
- Genus: Spatalla
- Species: S. racemosa

Binomial name
- Spatalla racemosa (L.) Druce

Synonyms
- Leucadendron racemosum L.; Protea laxa Poir.; Protea racemosa (L.) L.; Spatalla bracteata R.Br.; Spatalla cylindrica E.Phillips; Spatalla gracilis Knight; Spatalla laxa R.Br.; Spatalla ramulosa R.Br.

= Spatalla racemosa =

Species of flowering plant

Spatalla racemosa, the lax-stalked spoon, is a flower-bearing shrub that belongs to the genus Spatalla and forms part of the fynbos. The plant is native to the Western Cape of South Africa where it is found in the Kogelberg, Groenland mountains, Babilonstoringberge, Kleinrivier Mountains as well as at Villiersdorp.

The shrub grows only 50 cm tall and flowers from September to March. The plant dies after a fire but the seeds survive. The plant is bisexual and pollination takes place through the action of insects. Two months after the plant has flowered, the ripe seeds fall to the ground where they are spread by ants. The plant grows in a variety of habitats: rocky slopes and level, sandstone soil at elevations of 150–620 m.
