= Spatalla barbigera =

Conservation status
- Near Threatened (IUCN 3.1)

Scientific classification
- Kingdom: Plantae
- Clade: Tracheophytes
- Clade: Angiosperms
- Clade: Eudicots
- Order: Proteales
- Family: Proteaceae
- Genus: Spatalla
- Species: S. barbigera

Binomial name
- Spatalla barbigera Salisb. ex Knight

Synonyms
- Protea polystachia (R.Br.) Poir.; Protea sericifolia Poir.; Spatalla burchellii E.Phillips; Spatalla polystachya R.Br.; Spatalla sericea R.Br.; Phylica abietina E.Mey.

Species of flowering plant

Spatalla barbigera, the fine-leaf spoon, is a flower-bearing shrub that belongs to the genus Spatalla and forms part of the fynbos. The plant is endemic to the Western Cape Province of South Africa.

== Description ==
The shrub is flat, rounded, grows only 80 cm (31 in) tall and flowers from May to November. The plant dies after a fire but the seeds survive. The plant is bisexual and pollinated by insects. Two months after the plant has flowered, the ripe seeds fall to the ground where they are spread by ants.

== Distribution and habitat ==
The plant is found in the eastern Langeberg, Outeniqua Mountains, and central Swartberg. It grows in a variety of habitats at elevations of 400–620 m (1,310–2,030 ft).
