= Spatalla caudata =

Conservation status
- Endangered (IUCN 3.1)

Scientific classification
- Kingdom: Plantae
- Clade: Tracheophytes
- Clade: Angiosperms
- Clade: Eudicots
- Order: Proteales
- Family: Proteaceae
- Genus: Spatalla
- Species: S. caudata

Binomial name
- Spatalla caudata (Thunb.) R.Br.

Synonyms
- Protea brevifolia (R.Br.) Poir.; Protea caudata Thunb.; Spatalla brevifolia R.Br.; Spatalla caudiflora Knight; Spatalla ericifolia Knight; Spatalla thunbergii R.Br.; Spatallopsis caudata (Thunb.) E.Phillips; Spatallopsis caudiflora (Knight) E.Phillips; Spatallopsis ericifolia (Knight) E.Phillips

Species of flowering plant

Spatalla caudata, the woolly-hair spoon, is a flower-bearing shrub that belongs to the genus Spatalla and forms part of the fynbos. The plant is native to the Western Cape Province of South Africa, where it is found in the Cederberg, Groot Winterhoek Mountains and Hex River Mountains.

The shrub grows 1.0 m tall and flowers from August to October. Fire destroys the plant but the seeds survive. The plant is bisexual and pollination takes place through the action of insects . The fruit ripens, two months after flowering, and the seeds fall to the ground where they are spread by ants. The plant grows in sandstone sand along streams or streams at elevations of 910-1250 m.
