= Gordon's Bay =

Harbour town in South Africa

Gordon's Bay Gordonsbaai
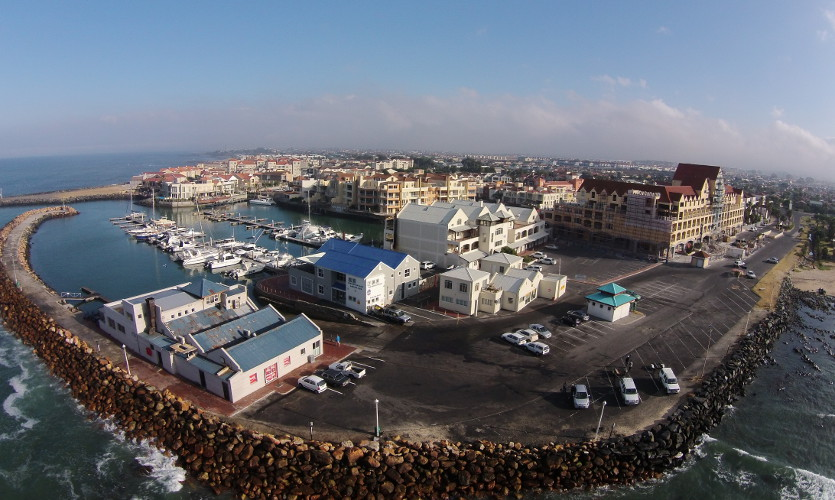
- Harbour Island, Gordon's Bay

- Location within Western Cape Location within South Africa
- Coordinates: 34°09′00″S 18°52′00″E
- Country: South Africa
- Province: Western Cape
- Municipality: City of Cape Town

Area
  - Total: 9.67 km^{2} (3.73 sq mi)

Population (2011)
  - Total: 16,776
  - Density: 1,730/km^{2} (4,490/sq mi)

Racial makeup (2011)
  - Black African: 10.9%
  - Coloured: 19.8%
  - Indian/Asian: 1.5%
  - White: 65.6%
  - Other: 2.2%

First languages (2011)
  - Afrikaans: 59.1%
  - English: 32.6%
  - Xhosa: 2.1%
  - Other: 6.2%
- Time zone: UTC+2 (SAST)
- Postal code (street): 7140
- PO box: 7151
- Area code: 021

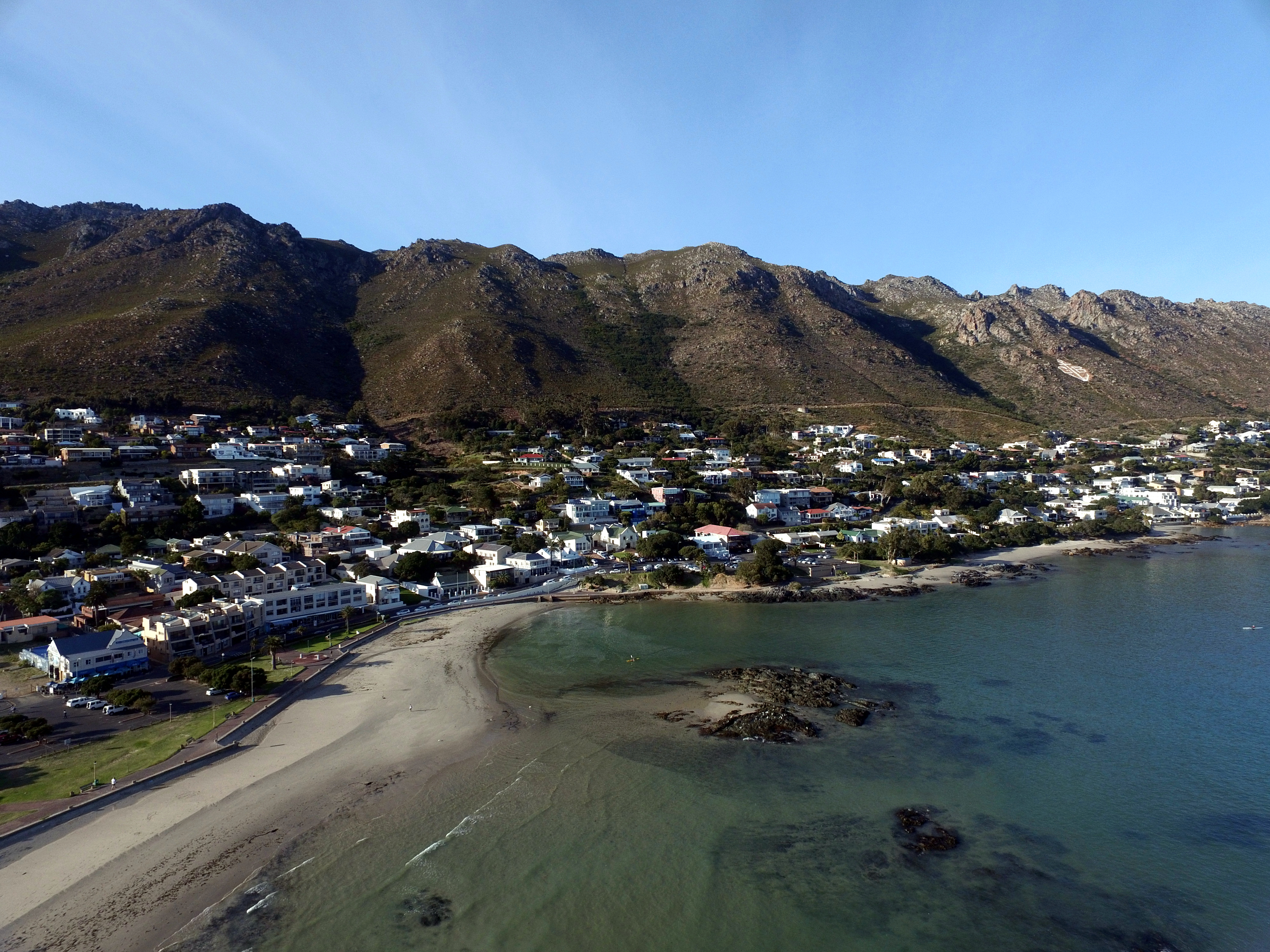
An aerial photograph of the beach at Gordons Bay.

Gordon's Bay (Afrikaans: Gordonsbaai) is a harbour town in the Western Cape province of South Africa. It is included in the City of Cape Town metropolitan municipality Eastern Suburbs region (formerly called Helderberg Basin). It is situated on the shores of Gordon's Bay in the northeastern corner of False Bay about 58 km from Cape Town to the south of the N2 national road and is named after Robert Jacob Gordon (1743–1795), the Dutch explorer of Scottish descent.

Gordon's Bay is the smallest of three towns in the Helderberg region (Somerset West, Strand and Gordon's Bay), so named after the Helderberg Mountain which is part of the Hottentots-Holland Mountains which border the locality on two sides. Gordon's Bay was originally named "Fish Hoek", many years before the town of the same name, located on the western side of False Bay, was founded. Evidence of this can be seen on the outside wall of the local Post Office.

Gordon's Bay consists of the old village, situated around the old harbour and Bikini Beach, the mountainside on the lower slopes of the Hottentots-Holland mountains overlooking False Bay, and the low-lying suburbs close to the main beach, making up the most recent expansion of the town.

The older part of Gordon's Bay includes the South African Naval College, a junior officer training center adjacent to the old harbour and yacht marina. Above the harbour on the mountainside is an emblem of a giant anchor and the letters "GB" assembled from painted stones which stands for General Botha, the name of the earlier training base, SATS General Botha, which was also the original name of the naval station in the town. The Steenbras Dam, one of Cape Town's suppliers of drinking water, is located behind the mountain above the town.

Gordon's Bay has a blue flag beach, Bikini Beach, to the south of the harbour, which is generally popular, particularly with students from the University of Cape Town and Stellenbosch University. The beach is funded by the City of Cape Town to properly maintain facilities that include public showers, changing rooms, bathrooms and a grassy promenade. The beach is considered safe and is regularly patrolled by a seasonal security guard.

== Coat of arms ==
Gordon's Bay was a municipality from 1961 to 1996. The town council assumed a coat of arms, designed by Schalk Pienaar, in July 1962, and registered it with the Cape Provincial Administration in November 1962 and at the Bureau of Heraldry in November 1988.

The arms were : Per chevron, the chief barry wavy Argent and Azure and the base Vert, in chief two anchors and in base a protea slipped and leaved, Or. In layman's terms, the shield was divided in two by a chevron-shaped line, the upper half displaying two golden anchors on a background of silver and blue wavy stripes, and the lower half a golden protea flower on a green background.

The crest was a yacht in full sail, and the motto Sol et salubritas.

== See also ==
- Ports and harbours in South Africa
- Steenbras Dam
- List of reservoirs and dams in South Africa

== Schools ==
The town does not have much educational opportunities, except for a couple daycares, and two primary schools, Gordon's Bay Primary School and Temperance Town Primary School. The town has no high school. Many children will either have to homeschool or attend other secondary institutions such as Hoërskool Strand, Parel Vallei High School, and Hottentots Holland High School.
