= Hottentots Holland Mountains =

Mountain range in the Western Cape, South Africa

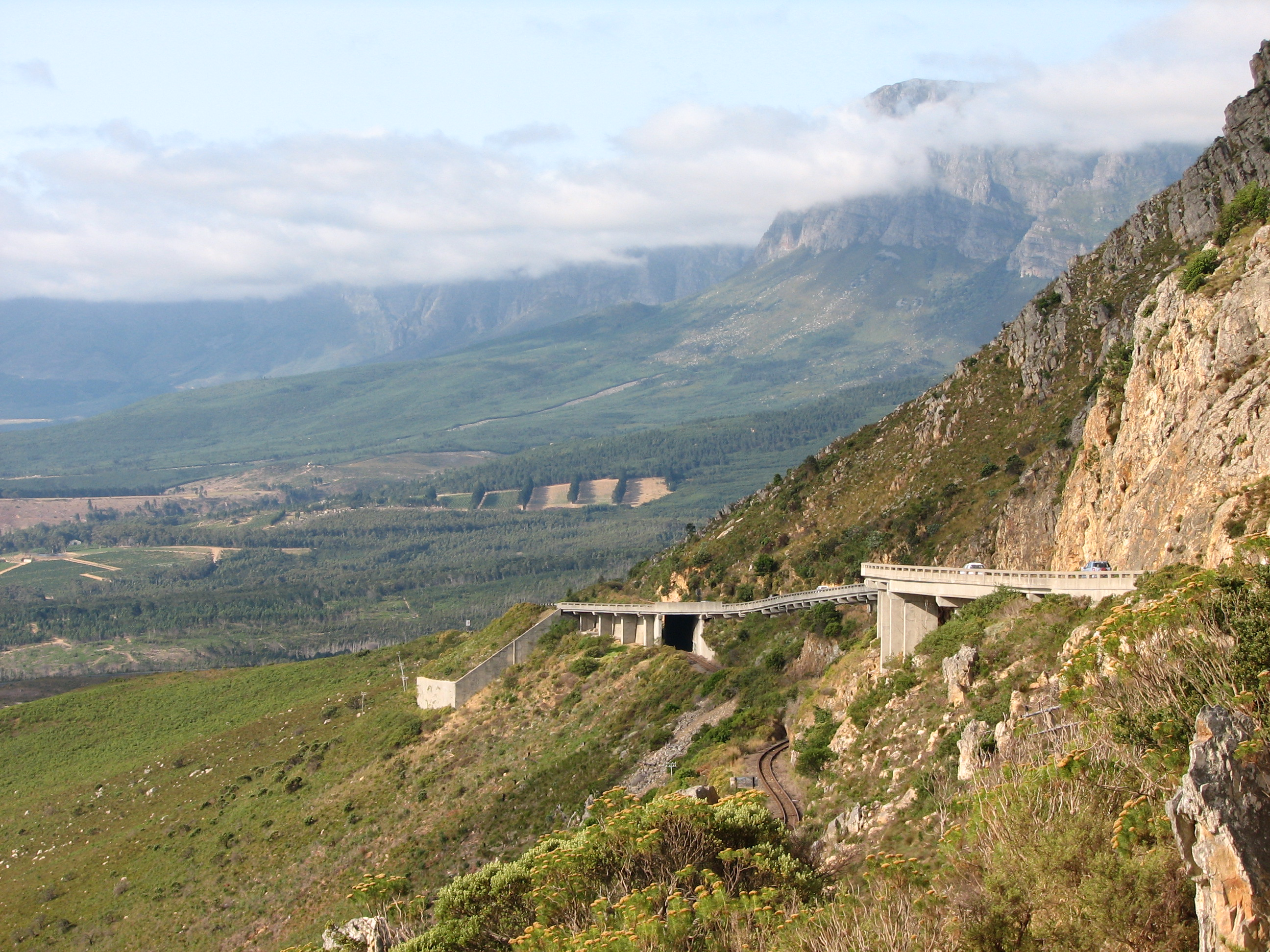
- Hottentots Holland Mountains and Sir Lowry's Pass

Highest point
- Peak: Somerset Sneeukop
- Elevation: 1,590 m (5,220 ft)
- Prominence: 241 m (791 ft)
- Coordinates: 34°2′5.56″S 18°59′6.53″E

Geography
- Location within South Africa Location within Western Cape
- Country: South Africa
- State: Western Cape
- Region: Overberg

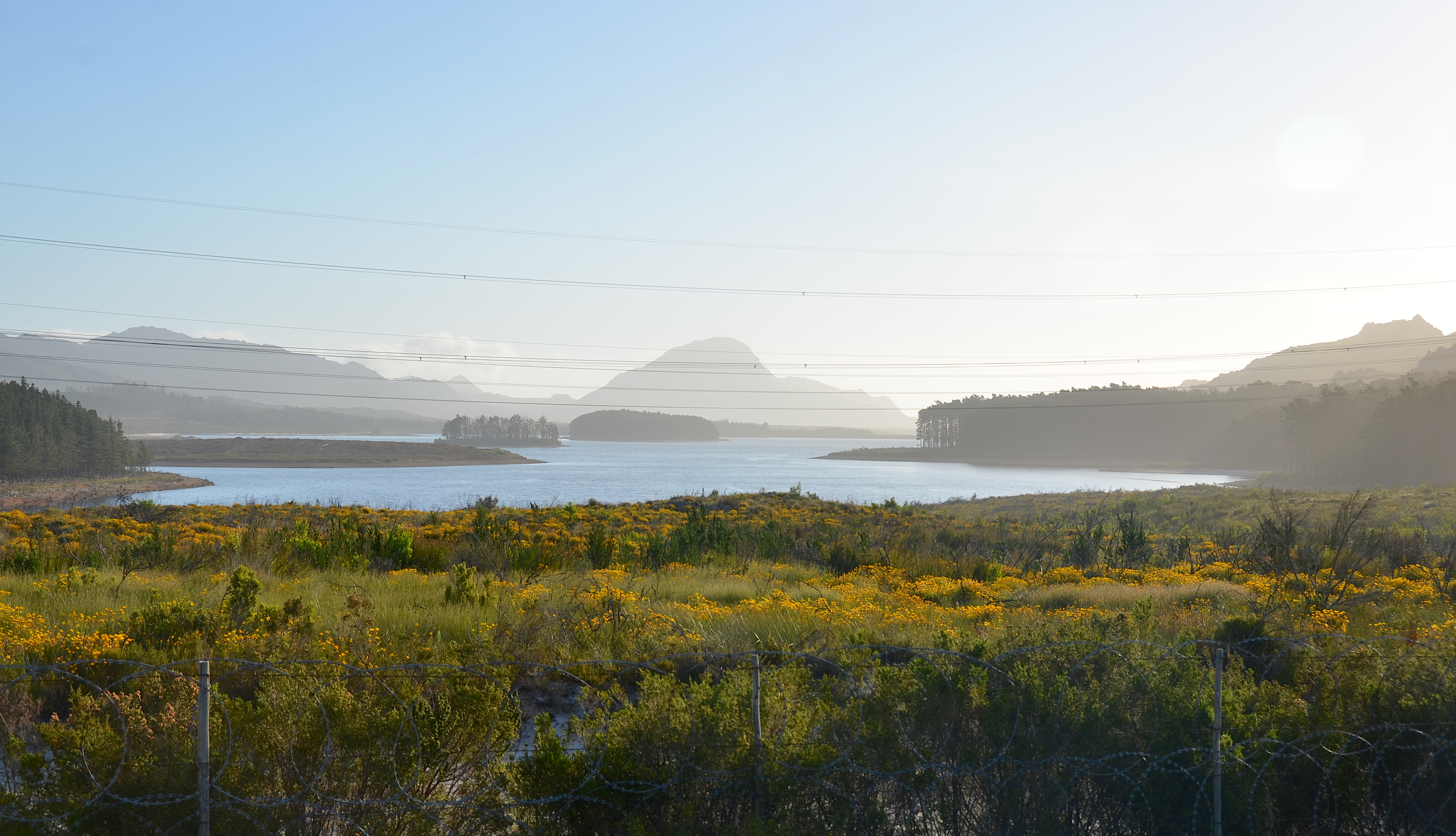
Steenbras Dam, view from N2

The Hottentots Holland Mountains are part of the Cape Fold Belt in the Western Cape, South Africa. The mountain range forms a barrier between the Cape Town metropolitan area and the southern Overberg coast.

The range lies east of central Cape Town between the towns of Somerset West and Gordon's Bay to the west, and the Elgin valley to the east. Sir Lowry's Pass is the only crossing, in the form of the N2 motorway. The Steenbras Dam, one of Cape Town's main supply dams, is located in the Elgin valley south of the town of Grabouw due to the abundant rainfall normally experienced in the uplands of the catchment area.

== Pass ==
The Gantouw (Eland Pass) ceased to be used by wagons on 6 July 1830, when the new Sir Lowry's Pass road was opened. When previous migrants decided to leave the Cape Town area, or Cape Colony as it was then known, this was the first mountain range they crossed. Cuts and wheel markings from their ox wagons can still be seen in rock formations of the old Gantouw pass which lies slightly north of the new Sir Lowry's Pass, and are a national monument. This route still serves as the primary route out of the Cape Town area for travellers heading east along the coast of South Africa.

== Climate ==
The climate is typically Mediterranean; however, it is generally much cooler and more verdant than other areas in the Western Cape, with annual precipitation exceeding 1,500 m (4,900 ft). Summer temperature maxima rarely exceeding 25 °C (77 °F). Snow is not unusual on the higher peaks during winter, like Verkykerkop, Somerset Sneeukop (Afrikaans: Snow Peak) at 1,590 m (5,220 ft) high and The Triplets in the northern section of the range. This area and the other ranges to the south are considered the hub of the Cape floristic region with the most biodiversity in the entire fynbos biome. The surrounding lowlands have rich alluvial soils supporting viticulture and other deciduous fruit farms.

== Peaks ==
- Haelkop: 1,384 m (4,541 ft)
- Somerset-Sneeukop: 1,590 m (5,220 ft)
- Landrosnaald: 1,346 m (4,416 ft)
- Pisgah: 1,349 m (4,426 ft)
- Sneeukopnaald: 1,285 m (4,216 ft)
- Landroskop: 1,435 m (4,708 ft)
- Hans se Kop: 1,200 m (3,900 ft)
- Moordenarrskop: 1,343 m (4,406 ft)
- Pic-Sans-Nom: 1,184 m (3,885 ft)
- West Peak: 1,003 m (3,291 ft)
- Helderberg Dome: 1,137 m (3,730 ft)
- Driekop: 971 m (3,186 ft)
- Suurberg: 1,090 m (3,580 ft)
- Valleiberg: 1,370 m (4,490 ft)
- Langklippiek: 1,359 m (4,459 ft)
- Triplet 1: 1,516 m (4,974 ft)
- Triplet 2: 1,512 m (4,961 ft)
- Triplet 3: 1,479 m (4,852 ft)

== Hottentots Holland Nature Reserve ==
The Hottentots Holland Nature Reserve is a World Heritage Site with an area of 70,000 ha (170,000 acres; 700 km^{2}; 270 sq mi) from Elgin to north of Villiersdorp, between the Stellenbosch Mountains and the Groenland mountains. The reserve functions as a conservation area for mountain fynbos, with about 1300 plant species, of which some are rare and endemic. About 110 species of bird have been recorded, and a variety of indigenous animals, some of which have been reintroduced.

Altitude in the reserve varies from 500 m (1,600 ft) to 1,590 m (5,220 ft). Weather conditions can be unpredictable, and bad weather can make conditions unpleasant and dangerous. The entrance to the reserve is at Nuweberg, in Viljoen's Pass (R321) between Villiersdorp and Grabouw. An additional 7,000 ha (17,000 acres; 70 km^{2}; 27 sq mi) of state and privale land adjacent to the reserve is co-managed by the Theewaterskloof Conservancy, which includes CapeNature and private landowners.
