= Splendrillia falsa =

Scientific classification
- Kingdom: Animalia
- Phylum: Mollusca
- Class: Gastropoda
- Subclass: Caenogastropoda
- Order: Neogastropoda
- Superfamily: Conoidea
- Family: Drilliidae
- Genus: Splendrillia
- Species: S. falsa

Binomial name
- Splendrillia falsa (Barnard, 1958)

Synonyms
- Drillia falsa Barnard, 1958

Species of gastropod

Splendrillia falsa is a species of sea snail, a marine gastropod mollusk in the family Drilliidae.

== Description ==
The length of the shell attains 9.5 mm, its diameter 3.75 mm.

== Distribution ==
This marine species occurs off False Bay, South Africa
