= Helderberg Marine Protected Area =

Marine conservation area in the Western Cape in South Africa

- IUCN category Ia (strict nature reserve)
- Helderberg MPA location
- Location: Western Cape, South Africa
- Nearest city: Cape Town
- Coordinates: 34°05′S 18°47′E
- Area: 24.6 km^{2} (9.5 sq mi)
- Established: 2000
- Governing body: City of Cape Town
- Helderberg Marine Protected Area (South Africa)

The Helderberg Marine Protected Area is a small marine conservation area on the north-eastern side of False Bay in the Western Cape province of South Africa, It lies between the mouths of the Lourens River in the Strand, and the Eerste River in Macassar.

The Helderberg MPA is in the warm temperate Agulhas bioregion. The shoreline is sandy beach with mobile dunes, and the seabed is low sandstone reef with kelp beds and sand sediments. The areas nearest to the river mouths are in relatively poor condition due to pollution of the river water. The beach inside the MPA is the most pristine part of the north shore of False Bay.

== History ==
The area was established as a reserve in 1991. The MPA was proclaimed by the Minister of Environmental Affairs and Tourism, Mohammed Valli Moosa, in Government Gazette No. 21948 of 29 December 2000 in terms section 43 of the Marine Natural Resources Act, 18 of 1998.

== Purpose ==
A marine protected area is defined by the IUCN as "A clearly defined geographical space, recognised, dedicated and managed, through legal or other effective means, to achieve the long-term conservation of nature with associated ecosystem services and cultural values".

== Extent ==
The length of the protected shoreline is 4 km, and the area of protected ocean is 24.6 km^{2}.

=== Zonation ===
The whole MPA is a no-take reserve.

=== Boundaries ===
- Northern boundary is the high-water mark,
- Southern boundary is a line 500 m seawards of the high-water mark.
- Western boundary is a line at 180° true from the mouth of the Eerste River,
- Eastern boundary is a line at 180° true from the mouth of the Lourens River, in False Bay.

== Management ==
The marine protected areas of South Africa are the responsibility of the national government, which has management agreements with a variety of MPA management authorities, in this case, the MPA is managed by the City of Cape Town with funding from the SA Government through the Department of Environmental Affairs (DEA).

The Department of Agriculture, Forestry and Fisheries is responsible for issuing permits, quotas and law enforcement.

Management of the Helderberg MPA has objectives compliant with the general objectives of the Marine Living Resources Act, which are to protect the indigenous fauna and flora and the environment on which they depend, protect breeding stock, facilitate stock recovery, improve stock in surrounding areas and maintain pristine communities for research, and to minimise conflict between competing uses of the area.

Specific biophysical goals of the MPA management plan are protection of the environment and maintenance of biodiversity and functioning of the ecosystems, to protect depleted and endemic species and their required habitats, and enhance sustainability of marine fisheries. Socioeconomic goals are to develop non-consumptive ecotourism, provide for research and monitoring effects of human activities, and promotion of conservation among tourists and scholars. The governance goals are to develop legal structures to protect the biodiversity of the MPA.

== Use ==
=== Activities requiring a permit ===
==== Fishing ====
Marine species for aquarium usage may only be collected under the authority of a valid permit issued under section 13 of the MLRA. Living organisms may be collected for scientific purposes, but only in terms of a permit.

==== Boating ====
There is no boat launching site within the Helderberg MPA. Boats may pass through and anchor in the waters, but all fishing gear must be stowed during passage.

=== Prohibited activities ===
The MPA is a no-take zone, so no fishing, harvesting of invertebrates or seaweeds, or bait collection of any kind is allowed.

== Geography ==
The main habitats in the Helderberg MPA are:

- Sandy beaches, which include the typical three zones:
  - the surf zone,
  - the beach, with intertidal and backshore zones, and
  - the sand dunes.

Sandy beaches are dynamic habitats, with change mostly driven by wave action. These habitats provide a home to hardy and well adapted organisms. The local dunes are part of a mobile dune system in which sand is transported in the littoral and longshore zones and is trapped by vegetation, causing fore-dune development.

=== General topography ===
The coastline is sandy beaches with mobile dune systems, offshore habitats include rocky reefs and soft sandy sediments.

=== Geology ===
Low sandstone reefs with sand deposits. Very fine, low density silt may settle during calm periods, but readily becomes suspended again when disturbed.

=== Bathymetry ===
The nautical charts of this area indicate a depth not exceeding 10 m.

=== Climate of the South-western Cape ===
The climate of the South-western Cape is markedly different from the rest of South Africa, which is a summer rainfall region, receiving most of its rainfall during the summer months of December to February. The South-western Cape has a Mediterranean type climate, with most of its rainfall during the winter months from June to September.

During the summer the dominant factor determining the weather in the region is a high pressure zone, known as the South Atlantic High, located over the South Atlantic ocean to the west of the Cape coast. Winds circulating in an anticlockwise direction from such a system reach the Cape from the south-east, producing periods of up to several days of high winds and mostly clear skies. These winds keep the region relatively cool. Because of its south facing aspect Helderberg MPA is exposed to these winds.

Winter in the South-western Cape is characterised by disturbances in the circumpolar westerly winds, resulting in a series of eastward moving depressions. These bring cool cloudy weather and rain from the north west. The south westerly winds over the South Atlantic produce the prevailing south-westerly swell typical of the winter months, which beat on the exposed coastline.

Temperatures are moderate and range from -5 °C minimum in winter and 35 °C maximum in summer. The annual average minimum and maximum temperatures are 11 °C and 24 °C respectively.

=== Seasonal variations in sea conditions ===
There are often summer upwelling events, during which water temperatures may drop to 11 °C. Although this area is included in the warm temperate Agulhas bioregion, it is part of the transition between warm and cool temperate regions.

== Ecology ==
Marine ecoregions of the South African Exclusive Economic Zone: Helderberg Marine Protected Area i in the Agulhas ecoregion.

This is a productive biologically-diverse area, and has the only population of the giant isopod Tylos granulatus south of Ysterfontein.

The MPA is in the warm temperate Agulhas ecoregion to the east of Cape Point which extends eastwards to the Mbashe River. There are a large proportion of species endemic to South Africa along this coastline.

Four major habitats exist in the sea in this region, distinguished by the nature of the substrate. The substrate, or base material, is important in that it provides a base to which an organism can anchor itself, which is vitally important for those organisms which need to stay in one particular kind of place. Rocky shores and reefs provide a firm fixed substrate for the attachment of plants and animals. Some of these may have Kelp forests, which reduce the effect of waves and provide food and shelter for an extended range of organisms. Sandy beaches and bottoms are a relatively unstable substrate and cannot anchor kelp or many of the other benthic organisms. Finally there is open water, above the substrate and clear of the kelp forest, where the organisms must drift or swim. Mixed habitats are also frequently found, which are a combination of those mentioned above.

There are two small degraded estuarine habitats at the borders of the MPA.

Rocky shores and reefs There are rocky reefs and mixed rocky and sandy bottoms. For many marine organisms the substrate is another type of marine organism, and it is common for several layers to co-exist. Examples of this are red bait pods, which are usually encrusted with sponges, ascidians, bryozoans, anemones, and gastropods, and abalone, which are usually covered by similar seaweeds to those found on the surrounding rocks, usually with a variety of other organisms living on the seaweeds.

The type of rock of the reef is of some importance, as it influences the range of possibilities for the local topography, which in turn influences the range of habitats provided, and therefore the diversity of inhabitants. Sandstone and other sedimentary rocks erode and weather very differently, and depending on the direction of dip and strike, and steepness of the dip, may produce reefs which are relatively flat to very high profile and full of small crevices. These features may be at varying angles to the shoreline and wave fronts. There are fewer large holes, tunnels and crevices in sandstone reefs, but often many deep but low near-horizontal crevices.

Sandy beaches and bottoms (including shelly, pebble and gravel bottoms) Sandy bottoms at first glance appear to be fairly barren areas, as they lack the stability to support many of the spectacular reef based species, and the variety of large organisms is relatively low. The sand is continually being moved around by wave action, to a greater or lesser degree depending on weather conditions and exposure of the area. This means that sessile organisms must be specifically adapted to areas of relatively loose substrate to thrive in them, and the variety of species found on a sandy or gravel bottom will depend on all these factors. Sandy bottoms have one important compensation for their instability, animals can burrow into the sand and move up and down within its layers, which can provide feeding opportunities and protection from predation. Other species can dig themselves holes in which to shelter, or may feed by filtering water drawn through the tunnel, or by extending body parts adapted to this function into the water above the sand.

Kelp forests

The open sea

=== Marine species diversity ===
==== Animals ====
The most abundant fauna found on sandy beaches are meiofauna. Their small size lets them live between the sand grains. They include nematodes, copepods and ostracods, which help break down organic matter, which then decomposes. Meiofauna are sensitive to pollution and other disturbances, and can be used to monitor pollution on sandy beaches.

The intertidal zone supports sandhoppers, mole and ghost crabs, plough snails, sand mussels and the African oystercatchers, Kelp gulls, Sanderlings and White-fronted plovers that feed on them.

Offshore, zooplankton and a variety of fish can be found.

===== Key marine fauna for protection =====
Linefish:

- Argyrosomus inodorus (silver kob)
- Argyrozona argyrozona (carpenter)
- Atractoscion aequidens (geelbek)
- Chrysoblephus gibbiceps (red stumpnose)
- Chrysoblephus laticeps (roman)
- Dichistius capensis (galjoen)
- Diplodus sargus (blacktail)
- Lithognathus lithognathus (white steenbras)
- Pachymetopon blochii (hottentot)
- Petrus rupestris (red steenbras)
- Polysteganus undulosus (seventy four)
- Scomber japonicus (chub mackerel)
- Seriola lalandi (yellowtail)
- Thyrsites atun (snoek)
- Umbrina canariensis (belman/baardman)

Elasmobranchs:

- Mustelus mustelus (smoothhound shark)
- Notorynchus cepedianus (spotted sevengill shark)
- Triakis megalopterus (spotted gulley shark)

Birds:

- Haematopus moquini (African oystercatcher)
- Phalacrocorax capensis (Cape cormorant)
- Phalacrocorax neglectus (bank cormorant)

Invertebrates:

- Haliotis midae (perlemoen)
- Jasus lalandii (West coast rock lobster)
- Parechinus angulosus (Cape sea urchin)

==== Endemism ====
The MPA is in the warm temperate Agulhas ecoregion to the east of Cape Point which extends eastwards to the Mbashe River. There are a large proportion of species endemic to South Africa along this coastline.

== Threats ==
Urban development in the fore-dune zone tends to be inundated by windblown sand. Artificial dune stabilisation and removal of fore-dunes for development can deplete the sand available for beach functioning. Pollution in by plastic and oil spills is a permanent threat if left unchecked. No specific research has been done on the threats to invertebrates in the MPA.

== See also ==
Marine protected areas of South Africa

- List of protected areas of South Africa
- Marine protected areas of South Africa – Protected areas of coastline or ocean in the EEZ of South Africa
