= Smitswinkel Bay =

Small bay south of Simon's Town in False Bay

- Smitswinkelbaai (Afrikaans)
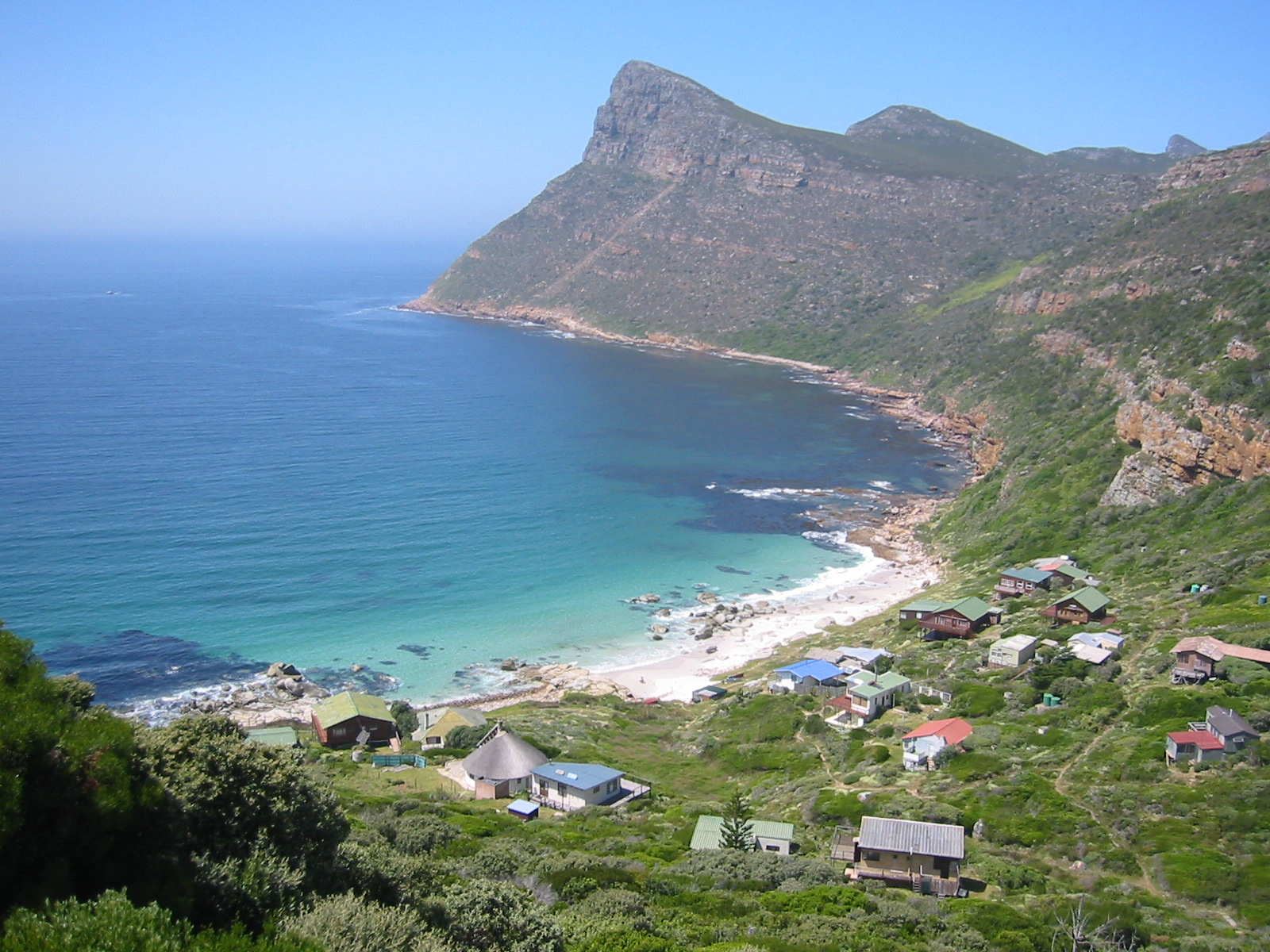

- Location in South Africa
- Coordinates: 34°15′57.13″S 18°28′15.96″E
- Ocean/sea sources: Southern Atlantic Ocean
- Basin countries: South Africa
- Settlements: Cape Town

Smitswinkel Bay (Afrikaans: Smitswinkelbaai) is a bay on the Atlantic Ocean at the southern end of the Cape Peninsula. It is located between Simon's Town and the Cape of Good Hope Nature Reserve. The name "Smitswinkel" means "the blacksmith's shop," possibly derived from two rocks in the bay that resemble an anvil and a bellows.

== See also ==
- False Bay
