= Seal Island, South Africa =

Island in False Bay, South Africa

- Location within Western Cape

Geography
- Location: Atlantic Ocean
- Coordinates: 34°8′10″S 18°34′58″E

Administration
- South Africa

Seal Island (formerly known as Witte Klip, meaning "White Rock") is a small land mass located 5.7 kilometres (3.5 miles) off the northern beaches of False Bay, near Cape Town in South Africa. The island is so named because of the great number of Cape fur seals that occupy it. It is 5 acres (2.0 hectares) in area and home to 64,000 Cape fur seals, also known as Brown fur seals.

The large population of seals on the island previously attracted great white sharks to live in abundance near the island, but their population in the area began to drop in 2010, and they had disappeared from the area by 2018. It is not entirely known why great white sharks disappeared from the area, but it is believed to have been caused by either orcas or humans hunting them. The disappearance of great white sharks from the island caused the populations of broadnose sevengill sharks and seals to increase, as they lost their primary predator.
