= False Bay =

Bay of the Atlantic Ocean at South Africa

- Valsbaai (Afrikaans)
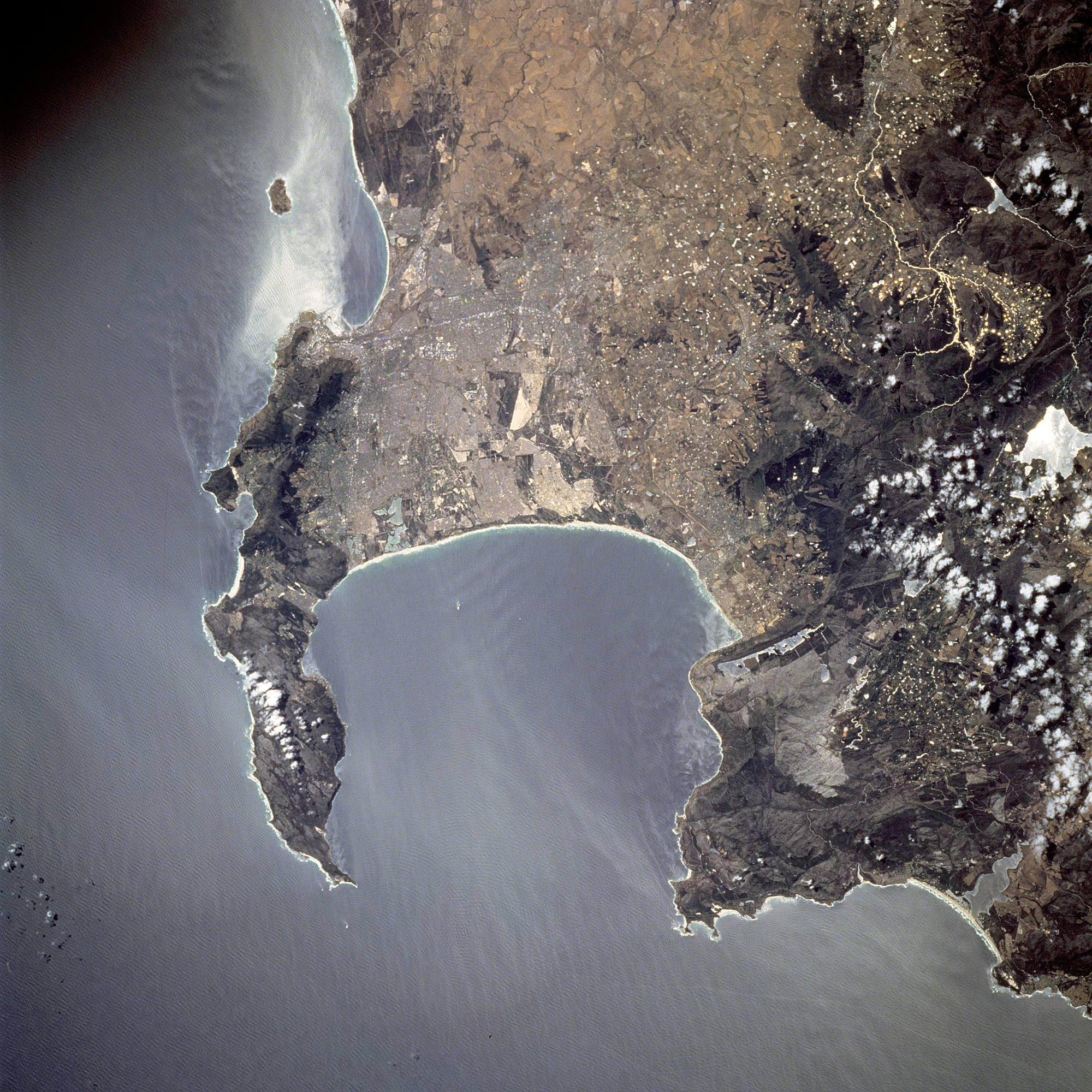
- Astronaut photo of Cape Town with False Bay

- Location in South Africa False Bay (South Africa)
- Coordinates: 34°13′47″S 18°38′43″E
- Primary inflows: Buffels River, Cape Peninsula, Buffels River, Pringle Bay, Eerste River, Elsjes River, Lourens River, Rooiels River, Sandvlei estuary, Silvermine River, Steenbras River
- Ocean/sea sources: Southern Atlantic Ocean
- Basin countries: South Africa
- Max. length: 30 km (19 mi)
- Max. width: 30 km (19 mi)
- Surface area: 1,090 km^{2} (420 sq mi)
- Max. depth: 90 m (300 ft)
- Water volume: 45 km^{3} (11 cu mi)
- Shore length^{1}: 116 km (72 mi)
- Islands: Seal island
- Settlements: City of Cape Town
- ^{1} Shore length is not a well-defined measure.

False Bay (Afrikaans: Valsbaai) is a body of water in the Atlantic Ocean between the mountainous Cape Peninsula and the Hottentots Holland Mountains in the extreme south-west of South Africa. The mouth of the bay faces south and is demarcated by Cape Point to the west and Cape Hangklip to the east. The north side of the bay is the low-lying Cape Flats, and the east side is the foot of the Hottentots Holland Mountains to Cape Hangklip, which is at nearly the same latitude as Cape Point. The bay is approximately square, with roughly the same length from north to south as from east to west, and the southern side open to the ocean. The seabed generally slopes gradually down from north to south, and is mostly fairly flat unconsolidated sediments. Much of the bay is off the coast of the City of Cape Town, and it includes part of the Table Mountain National Park Marine Protected Area and the whole of the Helderberg Marine Protected Area. The name "False Bay" was applied at least 300 years ago by sailors returning from the east, who confused Cape Point and Cape Hangklip, which are somewhat similar in profile when approached from the southeast.

False Bay is at the extreme western end of the inshore Agulhas marine ecoregion, which extends from Cape Point to the Mbashe river over the continental shelf, in the overlap zone between Cape Agulhas and Cape Point, where the warm Agulhas Current and the cooler South Atlantic waters mix. The continental shelf is at its widest in this ecoregion, extending up to 240 km (150 mi) offshore on the Agulhas Bank, but is considerably narrower off False Bay. This ecoregion has the highest number of South African marine endemics and is a breeding area for many species. The transition between the Agulhas ecoregion and the cooler Benguela ecoregion is at Cape Point, on the western boundary of False Bay.

False Bay also contains South Africa's largest naval base at Simon's Town (historically a base for the Royal Navy), and small fishing harbours at Kalk Bay and Gordon's Bay.

== Description and location ==
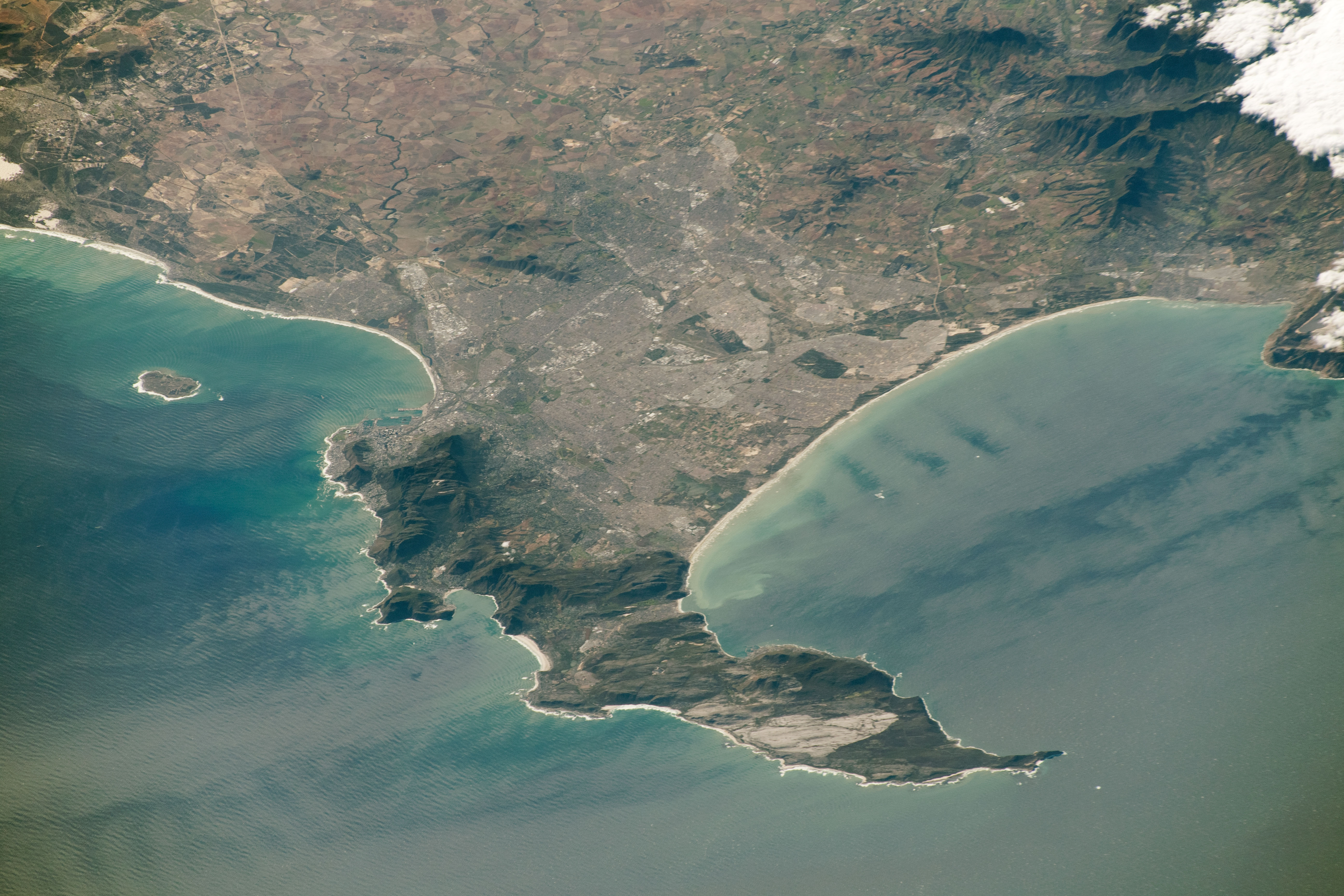
View of City of Cape Town showing the Cape Peninsula and Cape Flats from the International Space Station

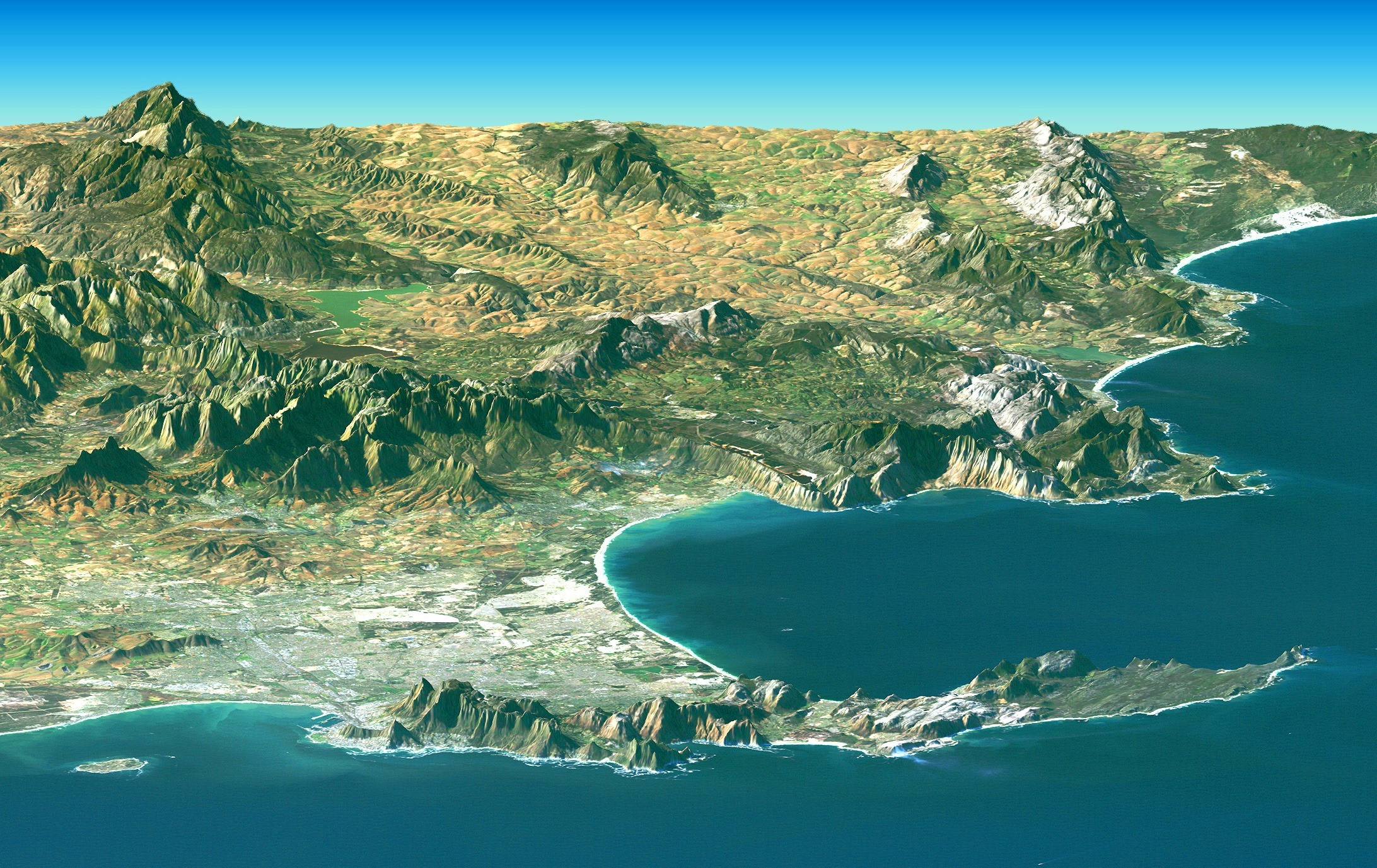
The Cape Peninsula seen from the West, False Bay (right) and Table Bay, with Robben Island (left). Compilation produced by NASA from Landsat and SRTM data. Vertical scale exaggerated.

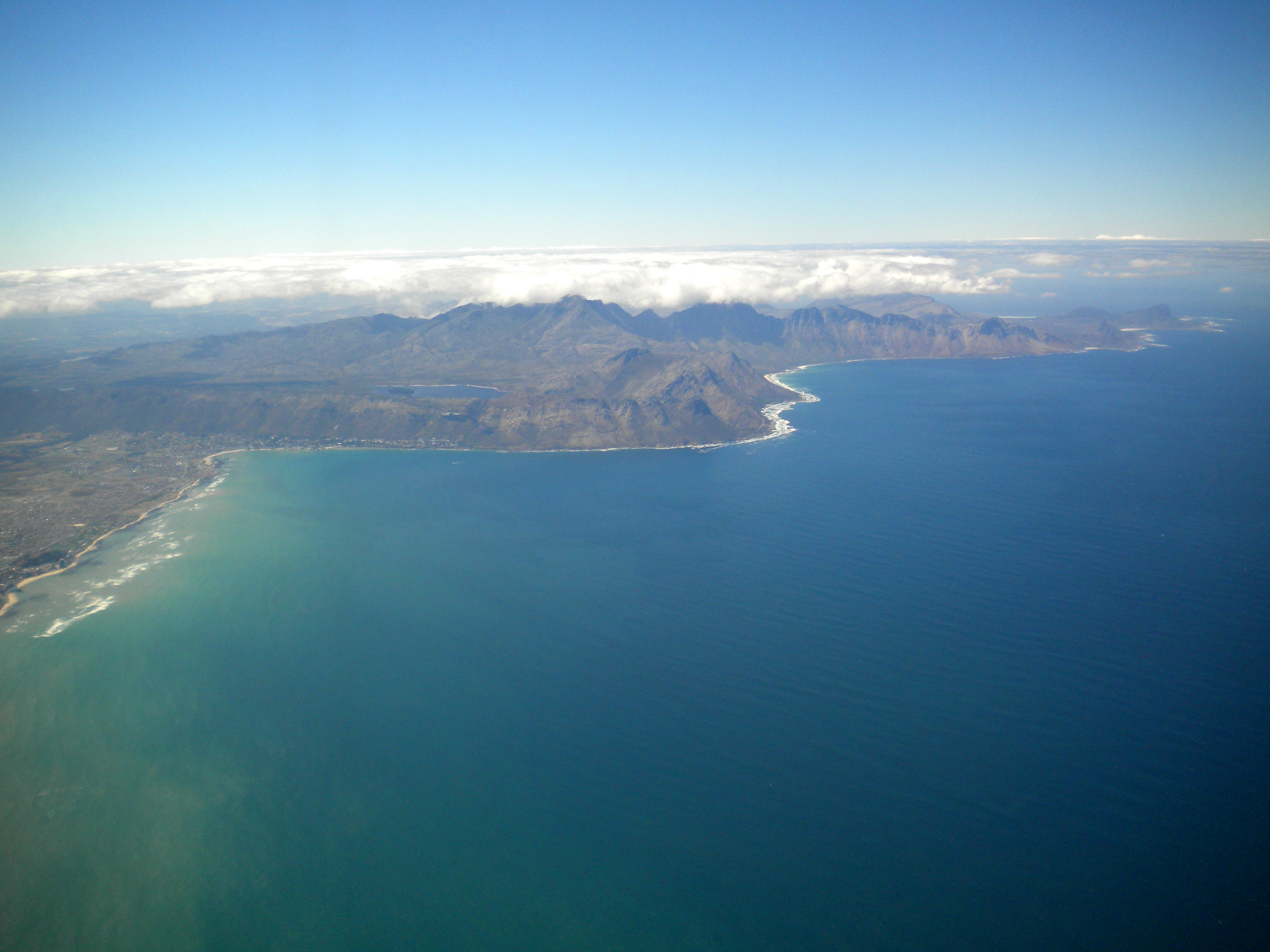
Aerial view of the eastern False Bay coast, looking somewhat south of east: Gordon's Bay (left) to Cape Hangklip (right)

The western side is bordered by the Cape Peninsula, and this stretch of coastline includes the smaller Buffels Bay, Smitswinkel Bay, Simon's Bay, and Fish Hoek Bay. At Muizenberg, the coastline becomes relatively low and sandy and curves east across the southern boundary of the Cape Flats to Gordon's Bay, to form the northern boundary of False Bay. From Gordon's Bay, the coastline swings roughly south and zigzags along the foot of the Hottentots Holland Mountains to Cape Hangklip, which is at nearly the same latitude as Cape Point. The highest peak on this side is Kogelberg at 1,269 m (4,163 ft).

The bay is approximately square-shaped with wobbly edges, with roughly the same length from north to south as from east to west (30 km (19 mi)), with the entire southern side open to the ocean. The area of False Bay has been measured at about 1,090 km^{2} (420 sq mi), and the volume is approximately 45 km^{3} (11 cu mi) (with an average depth of about 40 m (130 ft)). The land perimeter has been measured from a 1:50,000-scale map at 116 km (72 mi).

The eastern and western shores of the bay are very rocky and even mountainous; in places, large cliffs plunge into the water. Notable peaks associated with the bay include Koeëlberg (1,289 m (4,229 ft)), which rises from the water itself and forms the highest point of the Kogelberg, as well as Somerset Sneeukop (1,590 m (5,220 ft)) and Wemmershoek Peak (1,788 m (5,866 ft)), which are clearly visible across the bay. Some of the highest peaks visible across False Bay include Du Toits Peak near Paarl (1,995 m (6,545 ft)), Klein Winterhoek Peak near Tulbagh (1,995 m (6,545 ft)), Mostertshoek Peak at the Western extreme of the Michell's Pass (2,008 m (6,588 ft)) and Groot Winterhoek Peak North of Tulbagh (2,077 m (6,814 ft)). The northern shore is defined by a very long, curving, sandy beach. This sandy northern perimeter of the bay marks the southern edge of the Cape Flats. The bay is 30 km (19 mi) wide at its widest point.

Suburbs of Cape Town stretch right across the Cape Flats, from Simon's Town halfway down the Cape Peninsula to the north-eastern corner at Gordon's Bay. There are also two small towns of the Overberg region on the east coast of the bay, Rooiels and Pringle Bay.

=== Coastal landmarks ===
The coastal landmarks visible from offshore in False Bay, listed clockwise from Cape Point to Cape Hangklip, are:

- Cape Point, 34°21′26″S 18°29′51″E, the south-westernmost point of the bay, marked by the current lighthouse and the original lighthouse,
- Vasco da Gama Peak (266m), 34°20′41.07″S 18°28′29.32″E, the highest point nearest the mouth of the bay on the Cape Peninsula,
- Rooikrans, 34°20.456′S 18°28.407′E, A cliff area with a small sea cave,
- Matrooskop (109m), 34°19.576′S 18°27.834′E, a small local peak inshore of Buffels Bay,
- Buffels Bay, 34°19.123′S 18°27.650′E, a small bay on the west side of False Bay, with a small craft slipway,
- Bordjiesrif, 34°18.876′S 18°27.782′E, a small, low sandstone promontory on the north side of Buffels Bay,
- Paulsberg (369m), 34°17.635′S 18°27.808′E
- Judas Peak (319m), 34°16.7′S 18°28.3′E, the peak above the cliffs to the immediate south of Smitswinkel Bay,
- Batsata Rock, 34°16.603′S 18°28.836′E, an exposed inshore granite rock below Judas Peak near the northern boundary of the Paulsberg restricted zone, and the southern limit of Smitswinkel Bay,
- Smitswinkel Bay, 34°16.007′S 18°28.261′E, a small bay on the west side of False Bay, with a few coastal houses,
- Baboon Rock, 34°15.466′S 18°28.339′E, a landmark indicating the southern extent of the Castle Rock restricted area,
- Partridge Point, 34°15.343′S 18°28.606′E, a granite corestone promontory with several large exposed inshore rocks extending about a hundred metres into the bay on the north side of Smitswinkel Bay,
- Finlay's Point, 34°14′56.9″S 18°28′36.5″E, a smaller granite corestone promontory north of Partridge Point,
- Castle Rocks, 34°14.362′S 18°28.661′E, a larger granite corestone promontory, comprising a massive and fairly high outcrop at the end of a small, low isthmus, with several large inshore exposed rocks south of Miller's Point,
- Bakoven Rock, 34°14.040′S 18°29.012′E, an exposed inshore granite rock between Castle Rocks and Miller's Point, near the northern extent of the Castle Rocks restricted area,
- Rumbly Bay, 34°14.020′S 18°28.489′E, a small cove with a small craft slipway on the south side of Miller's Point,
- Miller's Point, 34°13.932′S 18°28.587′E, a fairly large but low granite corestone promontory, with a small craft slipway on the northwest side, and several exposed and drying rocks extending to seaward,
- Spaniard Rock, 34°13.030′S 18°28.017′E, an inshore exposed granite rock off Rocklands Point,
- Rocklands Point, 34°12.964′S 18°27.921′E, a minor granite promontory north of Miller's Point,
- Swartkop (679m), 34°12.943′S 18°27.025′E, the highest point on the Southern Peninsula,
- Simonsberg (548m), 34°12.299′S 18°26.304′E, the peak above Simon's Town,
- Oatlands Point, 34°12.067′S 18°27.395′E, a minor granite promontory with a large inshore exposed rock and a shoreline navigation beacon,
- Fishermans Beach,, a short, sandy beach north of Oatlands Point,
- Froggy Pond, 34°12.219′S 18°27.418′E, a small cove with a small sandy beach north of Fishermans Beach separated by a low rocky promontory,
- Windmill Beach, 34°12.067′S 18°27.395′E, a small sandy beach partly enclosed by massive granite boulders, with two small coves,
- Noah's Ark rock, 34°11.533′S 18°27.231′E, a conspicuous inshore exposed rock at the mouth of Simon's Bay,
- Simon's Bay, 34°11.073′S 18°25.945′E, the largest bay on the west side of False Bay, very well protected from the prevailing south westerly swell, but fairly exposed to wind and waves from the south-east,
- Boulders Beach, Seaforth, 34°11.833′S 18°27.082′E, a sandy beach between large scattered granite boulders,
- Simon's Town Naval Base harbour, 34°11.317′S 18°26.283′E, an artificial harbour with breakwater and sea-walls enclosing the naval dockyard,
- False Bay Yacht Club moorings, 34°11.427′S 18°26.015′E, a floating marina protected from the south-easterly wind and waves by the naval harbour, with somewhat less protected open moorings further into the bay,
- Long Beach, 34°11.236′S 18°25.579′E, a sandy beach on the west side of Simon's Bay, usually in the lee of the harbour for south easterly winds,
- Roman Rock, 34°10.877′S 18°27.606′E, an exposed rock in Simon's Bay with a lighthouse on it,
- Mackerel Bay, 34°10.302′S 18°25.761′E, a small sandy beach north of Simon's Town,
- Glencairn, 34°9′48″S 18°25′47″E, a small residential suburb in a valley north of Simon's Town, with a beach in Elsebaai,
- Elsebaai, 34°09.593′S 18°25.921′E, a small bay in the north part of Simon's Bay,
- Glencairn quarry, 34.15366°S 18.43629°E, a conspicuous excavation in the side of Else Peak,
- Else Peak (303m), 34°09.000′S 18°26.113′E, a small peak between Simon's Town and Fish Hoek,
- Fish Hoek bay, 34.13745°S 18.43374°E, the northernmost minor bay of the west side of False Bay with a sandy beach open to the sea,
- Sunny Cove, 34°08.661′S 18°26.239′E, the rocky sandstone coastline on the south side of Fish Hoek bay,
- Fish Hoek beach, 34°08.160′S 18°26.148′E, a sandy beach on the east side of the Fish Hoek–Noordhoek gap, a low-lying break in the mountain range of the peninsula between False Bay and the Atlantic coast.
- Trappieskop, 34°07.668′S 18°26.414′E, the hill above Kalk Bay,
- Kalk Bay harbour, 34°07.698′S 18°26.986′E, a small commercial fishing harbour in Kalk Bay, completely enclosing the tiny sandy beach,
- St James, 34°7′8″S 18°27′33″E, the suburb to the north of Kalk Bay,
- Kalkbaaiberg (517m), 34°06.737′S 18°26.382′E, the peak above Kalk Bay,
- Muizenberg (509m), 34°06.006′S 18°27.556′E, the peak to the west of Muizenberg suburb, and the northernmost peak directly overlooking the west side of False Bay,
- Muizenberg beach (Sunrise Beach), 34.10120°S 18.48948°E, a long sandy beach along the low-lying northwestern coast of False Bay,
- Kapteinsklip, 34°04.726′S 18°37.249′E, a low rocky promontory between Muizenberg and Strandfontein beaches,
- Strandfontein, 34°05.326′S 18°33.204′E,
- Wolfgat Nature Reserve, 34.0697°S 18.6482°E, a small coastal nature reserve on the north coast of the bay,
- Swartklip, 34°04.477′S 18°41.118′E,
- Monwabisi, 34.072853°S 18.686209°E, a resort area on the north coast of the bay,
- Macassar Beach, 34.07643°S 18.75224°E, a long stretch of sand beach on the north coast of the bay,
- Eerste River mouth, 34°04.873′S 18°45.887′E, the mouth of the largest river crossing the Cape Flats,
- Helderberg Marine Protected Area, 34°05′S 18°47′E, a small coastal marine protected area between the mouths of the Eerste and Lourens rivers,
- Lourens River mouth, 34°06.005′S 18°48.706′E, the mouth of the river flowing through Somerset West and Strand,
- Strand Beach, 34.10554°S 18.81776°E, a sandy shoreline along the coast of the suburb, becoming rocky to the east,
- Harbour Island marina, 34°09.097′S 18°51.356′E, a small craft harbour development on the north-eastern coast of the bay,
- Gordon's Bay beach, 34°09.499′S 18°52.070′E, a small sandy beach in the north-eastern corner of the bay,
- Gordon's Bay Harbour, 34°09.801′S 18°51.504′E, a small fishing harbour and marina,
- Steenbras River mouth, 34°11.671′S 18°49.194′E, mouth of a river with catchment to the east of the Hottentots Holland range,
- Boskloof Peak (648m), 34°12′15.12″S 18°50′20.04″E, mountain peak south of the Steenbras River mouth,
- Boskloof Point, 34°13.028′S 18°49.777′E, promontory south of the Steenbras River mouth,
- Kogelbaai, 34.23397°S 18.84900°E, a fairly long sandy beach on the east coast of the bay,
- Kogelberg, 34°13.880′S 18°53.253′E, a mountain peak above Kogelbaai,
- Rooielsberg (638m), 34°16.960′S 18°50.112′E, a peak above the point to the north of Rooi-Els,
- Rooi-Els River mouth, 34°17.848′S 18°49.20′E, the mouth of the Rooi-Els river at a small sandy beach in Rooi-Els bay,
- The Point (Rooi-Els), 34°17′51″S 18°48′50″E,
- Klein Hangklip (309m), 34°18′26″S 18°49′19″E, a small peak overlooking Rooi-Els,
- Rooi-Els, 34°18′05″S 18°48′59″E, a small coastal residential area in the Overberg district,
- Pringle Bay, 34°20′31″S 18°49′16″E, A small, shallow bay on the south-east side of False Bay, which has a small sandy beach on the east and a rocky coastline to the south, with a small residential town along the shore,
- Buffels River mouth, 34°20′20″S 18°40′47″E, the mouth of a small river, draining into Pringle Bay,
- Die Punt (Pringle Bay), 34°20′55″S 18°48′38″E, The point to the south of Pringle Bay,
- Pringle Peak (159m), 34°21′4.17″S 18°49′18.37″E, Peak at Pringle Bay,
- Hangklip (455m), 34°21.919′S 18°49.700′E, peak at the south eastern extreme of False Bay, with near vertical profile on the south side,
- Cape Hangklip, 34°21′13″S 18°49′39″E, a low promontory extending southwards below Hangklip Peak,

=== Bottom morphology ===
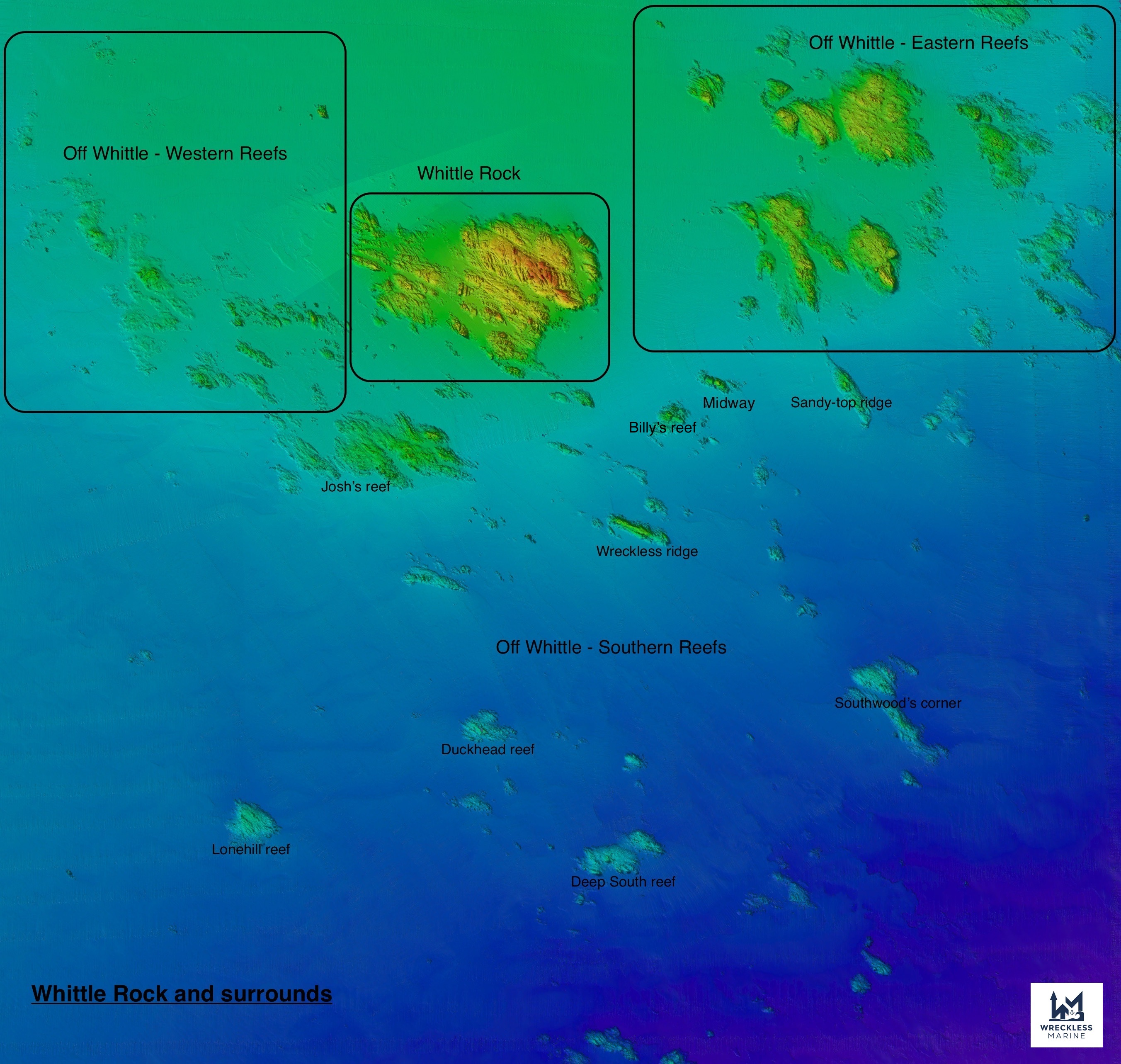
Multibeam sonar map of the Whittle Rock area

The bottom morphology of False Bay is generally smooth and fairly shallow, sloping gently downwards at about 3 m per km from north to south, so that the depth at the centre of the mouth is about 80 m (260 ft). The bottom is covered with sediment, ranging from very coarse to very fine, with most of the fine sediment and mud in the center of the bay. The main exception is a long ridge of sedimentary rock that extends southward from off the Strand to approximately level with the mouth of the Steenbras River. The southern tip of this ridge is known as Steenbras Deep.

There is one true island in the bay, Seal Island, a barren and stony outcrop of granite about 200 m (660 ft) long and with an area of about 2 ha (24,000 sq yd). It is about 6 km (3.7 mi) south of Strandfontein and is less than 10 m (33 ft) above sea level at its highest point. Many small rocky islets extend above the high-water mark, and other rocks and shoals that approach the surface. The largest of these, and the most significant navigational hazard in the bay, is Whittle Rock, a large outcrop of granite about halfway into the bay and a quarter of the way across from the Cape Peninsula (34°14.846′S 18°33.714′E), which is about 1 km (0.62 mi) in diameter and rises from a fairly flat sand bottom at about 40 m (130 ft) to within 4 m (13 ft) of the surface. There are smaller outlying granite reefs scattered to the south, east, and west of Whittle Rock, and more smaller granite reefs to the northwest. Most of the reefs on the western side of the bay are composed of granite from the Peninsula pluton. Still, east of Seal Island, they are generally sandstone, either of the Table Mountain series, or of the underlying Tygerberg formation. Whittle Rock reef can refract large south easterly storm waves, increasing their size in the vicinity of Kalk Bay harbour.

Other shoal areas include the granite reefs at Roman Rock in Simon's Bay, hard sedimentary or metamorphic rock at York shoal and hard sandstone at East shoal, and several isolated granite outcrops which are too deep to be navigational hazards in the western part of the bay. The palaeo-drainage of the bay is split between the western side of the bay and the eastern side by the relatively durable contact zone between the Peninsula granite and the Tygerberg sediments, with deep valleys cut into the bedrock during the glacial maximum, which have since been filled with sediments. The drainage of the west side passed to the west of Seal Island, Whittle Rock, and Rocky Bank. The east side was drained by a valley between Seal Island and East Shoal, and another valley to the east of Steenbras Ridge, which joined east of Rocky bank and exited the bay between Rocky Bank and Hangklip Ridge.

Outside the bay, but influencing the wave patterns in it, Rocky Bank is an extensive area of relatively flat sandstone reef between 20 and 30 m (66 and 98 ft) deep on the top, sloping down on all sides, but mostly to the south and east, where the depth can exceed 100 m (330 ft). A long underwater sandstone ridge sweeps across the eastern side of the mouth from Cape Hangklip towards the southwest, which is believed to affect water circulation in the bay. On the west side, a relatively shallow area of granite reef extends beyond the Cape Peninsula, with one major navigational hazard at Bellows Rock and a lesser one somewhat closer inshore at Anvil Rock.

=== Bathymetry ===
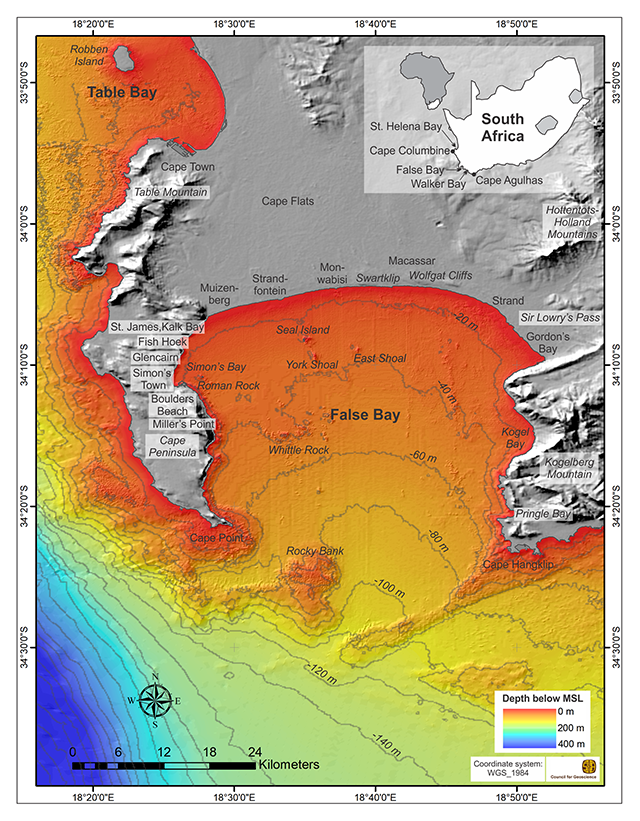
False Bay Bathymetry from SA Council for Geoscience

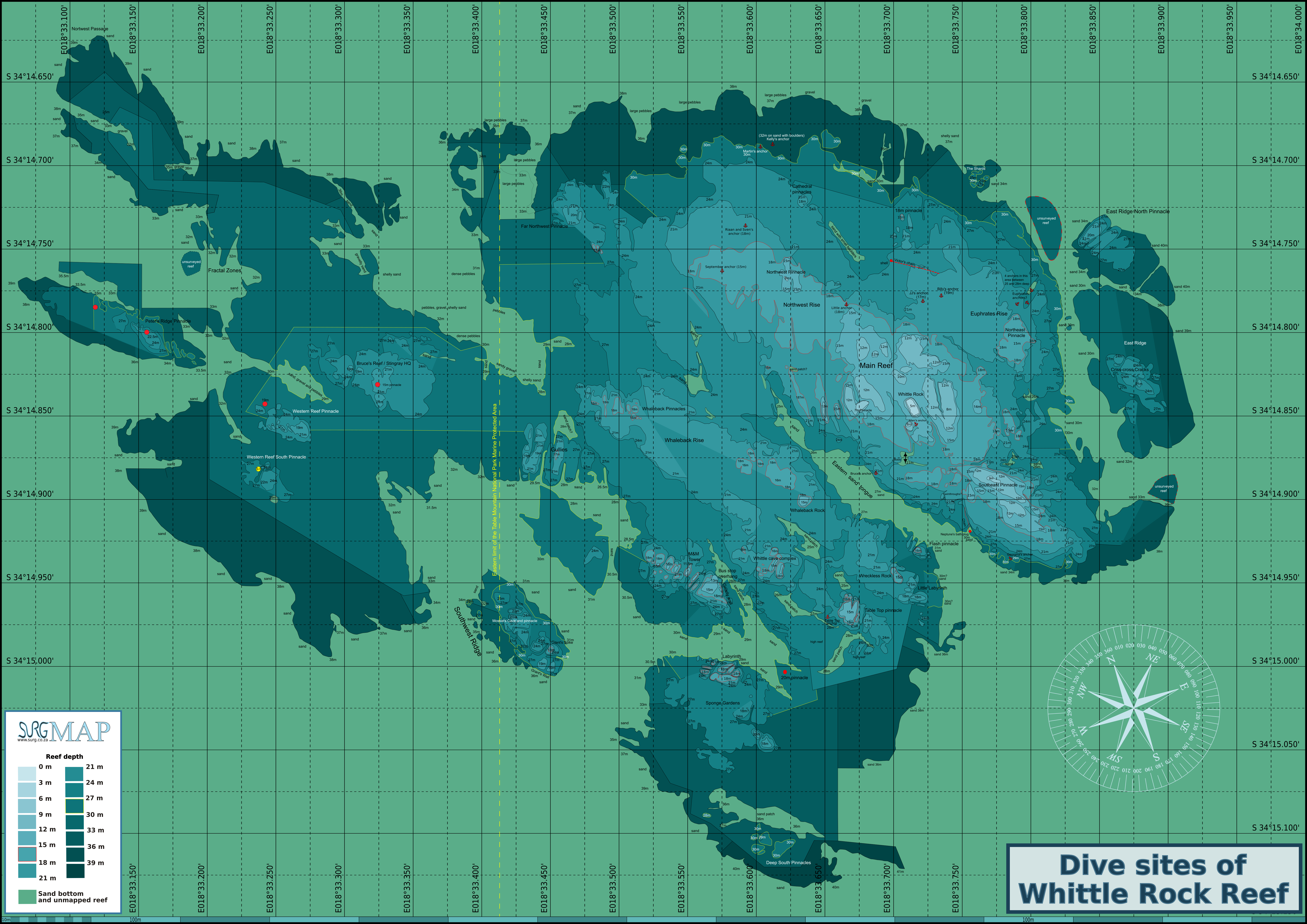
Bathymetry of the Whittle Rock reef

The bathymetry of False Bay differs from that of the west side of the Cape Peninsula. The west coast seabed tends to slope down more steeply than in False Bay and, although the close inshore waters are also shallow, the 100 m (330 ft) contour is mostly within about 10 km (6.2 mi) of the west coast, while the entire False Bay is shallower than about 90 m (300 ft). The bottom of the bay slopes down relatively gradually from the gently sloping beaches of the north shore to the mouth, and has a fairly even depth from east to west except close to the shorelines, with three major features disrupting this gentle slope. These are Seal Island, Whittle Rock, and the Steenbras ridge. Just outside the bay, there is a large shoal area at Rocky Bank, and a large ridge extending south-west from Cape Hangklip, which channels cold, nutrient-rich water into the west side of the bay during upwelling events.

=== Geology ===
The three main rock formations are the late-Precambrian Malmesbury Group (sedimentary and metamorphic rock), the Peninsula granite, a huge batholith that was intruded into the Malmesbury Group about 630 million years ago, and the Table Mountain group sandstones that were deposited on the eroded peneplain surface of the granite and Malmesbury series basement about 450 million years ago. The sand, silt, and mud deposits were lithified by pressure and then folded during the Permian–Triassic Cape Orogeny to form the Cape Fold Belt, which extends along the western and southern coasts of the Western Cape. The present landscape is due to prolonged erosion, which has carved deep valleys, removed parts of the once-continuous Table Mountain Group sandstone cover from the Cape Flats, and left high residual mountain ridges.

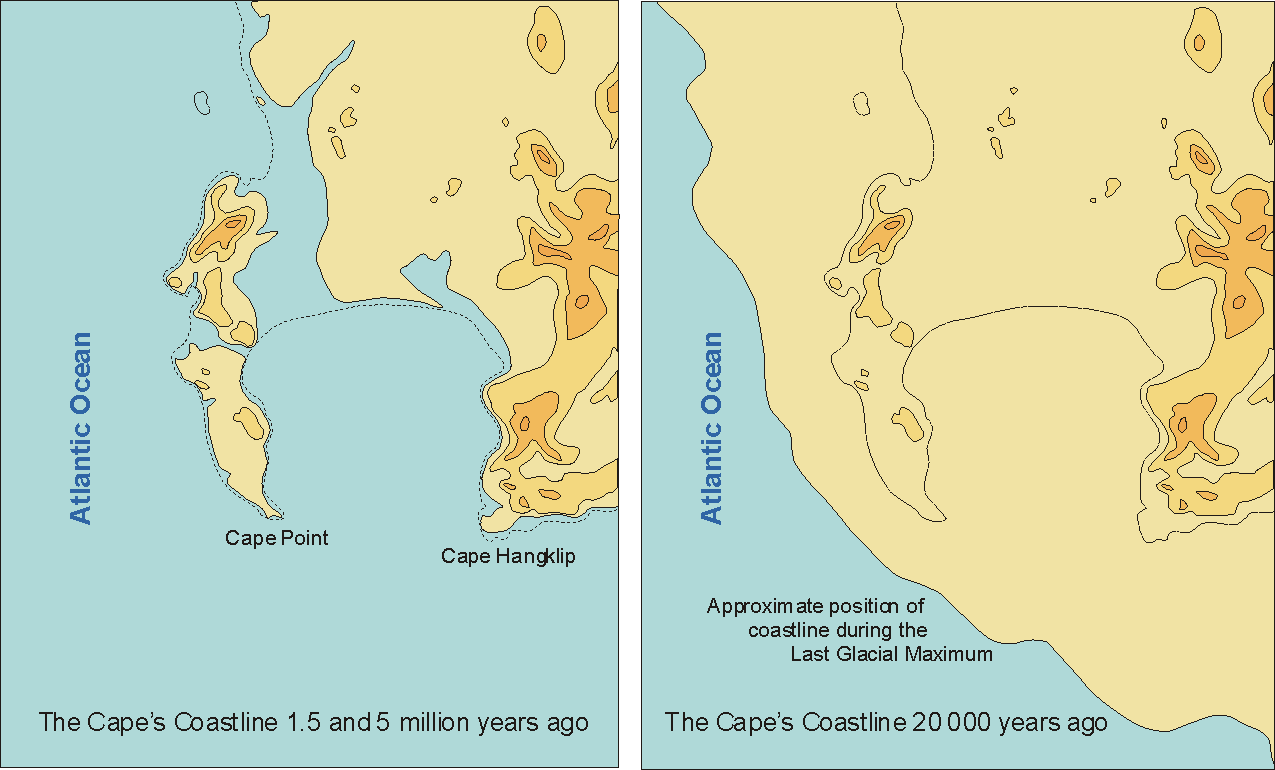
The Cape Peninsula shoreline in the case of (left) a 25m higher sea level that occurred around 5 and 1.5 million years ago, and (right) a 125m lower sea level at the time of maximum ice build-up during cold periods – the most recent being 20 000 years ago (after John S. Compton 2004)

At times, the sea covered the Cape Flats and Noordhoek valley, the Cape Peninsula was then a group of islands, and False Bay and the Cape Flats a strait. During glacial periods, the sea level dropped, exposing the bottom of False Bay to weathering and erosion; the last major regression left the entire bottom of False Bay exposed. During this period, an extensive system of dunes was formed on the sandy floor of False Bay. At this time, the drainage outlets lay between Rocky Bank and Cape Point to the west, and between Rocky Bank and Hangklip Ridge to the east.

=== Waves, tides, water circulation, and temperature ===
Swell entering the bay is predominantly the product of the westerly winds blowing over the Southern Ocean. The prevailing swell is about 12 to 25 seconds in period from the southwest, with an average height of about 3 m (9.8 ft). It impinges directly on the east coast of the bay, amplified by refraction over Rocky Bank in the region near the Steenbras River mouth, where rogue waves may occur. Further west, the swell refracts and diffuses around a fairly large shoal area around Cape Point, and is moderately to severely attenuated by the time it reaches the western shores.

Waves along the north coast of the bay between Macassar and Muizenberg generally break by spilling as the slope is gradual. In summer, strong south-easterly winds blow over a fetch partly limited by the width of the bay and generate short-period wind waves of around 6 seconds and 2 m (6.6 ft) height, and produce multiple lines of breakers along the north shore. Where the slopes are steeper, rip currents may form, posing a hazard to swimmers.

Northward propagating long period waves are focused in the northeast and northwest parts of False Bay by refraction effects over the shoal waters of Rocky Bank in the mouth of the bay, with measured heights of waves in the area between Steenbras mouth and Kogelbaai being up to twice the height of the waves in the Muizenberg to Strandfontein region for the prevailing southwesterly open ocean swell. The focusing effect is mostly on swells with a period of 13 seconds or more, and a direction between 210° and 245° true. The smaller and shallower reef at Whittle Rock towards the west side of the bay has a similar but lesser effect, and can focus longer period south-easterly waves on Kalk Bay. This is unusual, and associated with a cut-off low-pressure system causing the south-easterly winds to blow for an unusually long time over enough fetch to develop a sea sufficiently for it to be refracted by the shoal area. Wave height of southwesterly swells decreases from west to east along the north coast of False Bay from around Macassar to Gordon's Bay due to the effects of refraction and friction of the wave base on larger areas of offshore reef before reaching the shoreline.

Tides are regular, semi-diurnal, and relatively weak, and there are no strong tidal currents. Maximum tidal range at Simon's Town is 2 m (6.6 ft) at the highest astronomical tide, with a minimum range of about 0.56 m (1.8 ft) at mean neap tides. When large waves break at Macassar on a high tide, the beach is known to be dangerous for swimming, and beach erosion is increased.

The circulation patterns in False Bay are variable over time, with seasonal and longer-term cycles. There are cold-water upwelling events associated with south-easterly winds in summer, and periodic intrusions of warm-water eddies from the Agulhas Current along the south coast, both of which contribute to biodiversity.

Four main surface circulation patterns have been observed in False Bay. Wind is the dominant forcing influence on surface circulation, with tidal and inertial currents of secondary importance, mainly when the winds are weak. Gordon's Bay is in the wind shadow of the Hottentots-Holland Mountains for south easterly winds, and this causes a semi-permanent anticyclonic eddy and associated anticlockwise gyre, in the opposite direction to the usual cyclonic circulation of the main part of the bay.

A clockwise rotation driven by the south-easterly winds mostly occurs during summer. This circulation is partly set up by the west-northwesterly flow south of the bay, which splits at Cape Point. The northerly component sets up flow towards the equator on the western shores. South-easterly winds cause this clockwise pattern to dominate. North-westerly winds cause an anti-clockwise circulation, with an eastward current flowing south of the Bay and entering at Cape Hangklip. When there is no strong wind forcing, tidal forcing can occur on the incoming and outgoing tides. A fairly uniform northward flow occurs during flooding tides, and southward during ebbing tides, with bathymetry affecting the flow direction in shallow areas. These currents are most noticeable along the coastline and in the shallow northern parts of the bay between Simon's Town and Gordon's Bay.

In the deeper areas of the mouth of the bay, tidal and inertial currents appear to contribute to the variability of the deeper part of the water column, along with the effects of wind forcing. Wave energy focused by the various shoal areas outside and inside the bay is a driver of nearshore currents, particularly in the northern parts of the bay.

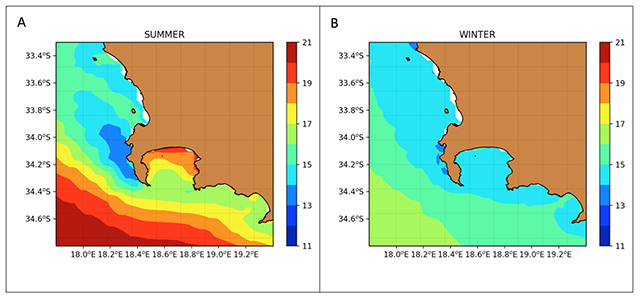
Charts of sea surface temperature in and near False Bay in summer and winter

In summer, False Bay is thermally stratified, with a vertical temperature range of 5 to 9 °C (41 to 48 °F) between the warmer surface waters and the cooler waters below 50 m (160 ft). In contrast, in winter, the water column is nearly constant in temperature at all depths. The development of a thermocline is strongest around late December and peaks in late summer to early autumn. In summer, the south easterly winds generate a zone of upwelling near Cape Hangklip, where surface water temperatures can be 6 to 7 °C (43 to 45 °F) colder than the surrounding areas, and bottom temperatures below 12 °C (54 °F).

In the summer to early autumn (January–March), cold water upwelling near Cape Hangklip causes a strong surface temperature gradient between the south-western and north-eastern corners of the bay. In winter, the surface temperature tends to be much the same everywhere. In the northern sector, surface temperatures vary a bit more (13 to 22 °C (55 to 72 °F)) than in the south (14 to 20 °C (57 to 68 °F)) throughout the year.

Surface temperature variation from year to year is linked to the El Niño–Southern Oscillation. During El Niño years, the South Atlantic high is shifted, reducing the south-easterly winds, so upwelling and evaporative cooling are reduced, and sea surface temperatures throughout the bay are warmer, while in La Niña years, there is more wind and upwelling and consequently lower temperatures. Surface water heating during El Niño increases vertical stratification. The relationship is not linear.

Water density dynamics are mostly temperature dependent, with only weak influences from salinity. The major influence on the temperature distribution is wind-driven upwelling and advection of cold water, which is most notable north-west of Hangklip and less marked near Gordon's Bay, due to strong south-easterly winds, with isolation as a secondary effect, mostly in the shallow waters of the northern and north-easterly regions. Waves may have a greater influence on nearshore temperatures than wind. Upwelling outside the bay along the coast east of Hangklip can also supply cold water to the bay.

=== Rivers and drainage ===
Drainage into False Bay can be considered from four watersheds: the east-flowing streams of the southern Cape Peninsula, the Cape Flats, the Helderberg basin, and the south-westwards drainage of the Hottentots-Holland mountains of the Overberg, extending south as far as Cape Hangklip.

The eastward draining rivers of the Southern Peninsula are generally fairly short and steep, and some, such as the Silvermine and Elsje rivers, have valley bottom wetlands at the coast. The Buffels River flows from a small spring to its mouth in Buffels Bay; the Klawersvlei River flows northwest from behind the mountains above Miller's Point over the plateau behind Simon's Town, before turning east over the escarpment and a high waterfall, entering the bay near the Simon's Town railway station; the Elsjes River flows from the Red Hill plateau to enter False Bay from the Glencairn valley; and the Silvermine River, originally known as the Esselstein River, drains the valley south of the Steenberg mountains and flows east across the Steenberg Plateau, then south through the Silvermine Valley before crossing the coastal Fish Hoek plain to enter False Bay at Clovelly on the north side of Fish Hoek Bay. Between these short and fairly steep streams, rainwater runoff generally flows directly down the mountainside into the bay.

The Sandvlei catchment drains the east side of the mountains north of Muizenberg and south of the Liesbeek catchment into False Bay: Sandvlei (Zandvlei) is the largest of eight estuaries on the False Bay coastline, with an area of about 155 ha (0.60 sq mi). The Westlake, Keysers, and Sand rivers feed it. The southern Diep River flows from the mountains above Constantia to Little Princessvlei, which drains into the Sand River, which flows into the northeast of Sandvlei. The Westlake River, also known as the Steenberg or Raapkraal River, originates on the slopes of the Steenberg and flows through the Kirstenhof wetlands into the north-west of Sandvlei. The Keysers River and its tributaries, the Grootbosch, Spaanschemat, and Prinseskasteel rivers, rise on Constantiaberg. The upper reaches of the Spaanschemat River are known as the Glen Alpine Stream, which originates below Constantia Nek and is joined by the Eagles Nest Stream.

Historically, the Cape Flats was partly covered in wetlands, particularly during winter, and retained much of its rainfall. Many of these wetlands have been destroyed by canalization and infilling to provide residential space. Many of the remaining perennial vleis are at the southwest side of the region (Zeekoevlei, Rondevlei, Zandvlei, etc.) and drain into the bay at Muizenberg through the estuary at Zandvlei. There is also groundwater seepage through the sand along the bay's north coast. The Elsieskraal River and the Black River catchment drain to the northwest into Table Bay, and do not affect False Bay. The Diep River catchment drains into Zandvlei, and Zeekoevlei and its catchment also drain to Zandvlei at times.

The Eerste River and its tributary, the Kuils River, drain into False Bay on the north coast, west of the Helderberg basin watershed. They drain part of the Cape Flats, but most of the catchment of the Eerste River is in the Stellenbosch district, between the Helderberg and Stellenbosch Mountains, and the Jonkershoek Valley.

The catchment of the Lourens River is in the Helderberg region. It is the region's largest river. The source is in Diepgat Ravine, in the Hottentots Holland Mountains. It is joined by minor tributaries from Landdroskloof and Sneeukopkloof in its upper reaches. The river flows in a south-westerly direction between the Helderberg and Schapenberg, through Somerset West and Strand, to a small estuary on the coast of False Bay. Its overall length is about 20 kilometres.

The Soete River is a small river that may have originally been part of the Lourens River system, diverting floodwater through an alternative route to the bay.

Sir Lowry's River drains the south side of Schapenberg and the west side of the Hottentots Holland south of Schapenberg. It enters the bay in Gordon's Bay.

The Steenbras River catchment is to the east of the Hottentots Holland mountains, and almost all of its water is retained by the upper and lower Steenbras Dams, which are a significant part of the municipal water supply to the City of Cape Town. Steenbras River mouth is south of Gordon's Bay.

The Rooiels River enters False Bay at Rooiels Beach. It drains a small catchment area in a nature reserve in the mountains of the southwest of the Overberg district.

=== Water quality ===
The nutrient contribution to False Bay surface waters from upwelling appears to exceed that from terrestrial sources via runoff and groundwater seepage. Still, pollutants from terrestrial sources can persist and adversely affect coastal ecosystems and recreational activities. Mixing with offshore water has a significant effect on surf zone and inshore water quality. The effects of microbial processes on inshore water quality and the relative contribution of anthropogenic nutrient sources remain unknown but are likely to be increasing.

== History ==
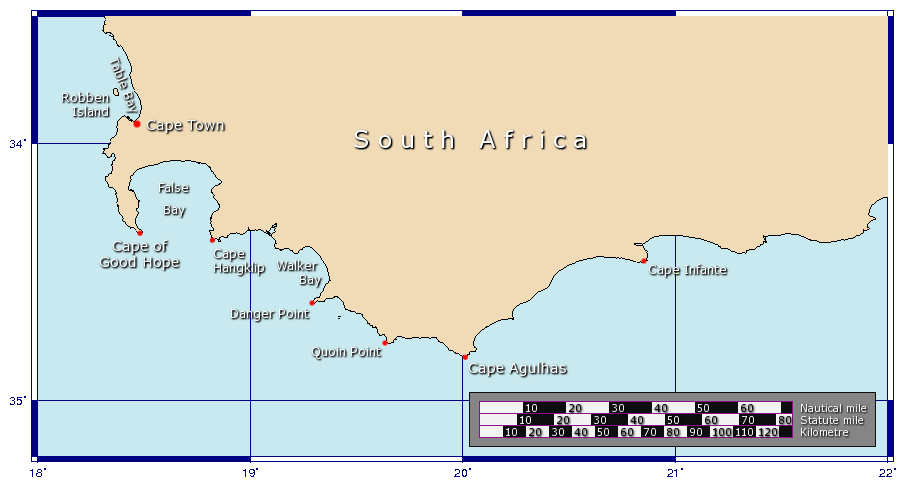
Map showing the locations of False Bay and Table Bay

In pre-colonial times, False Bay, along with most of the Southern African coast, provided sustenance to the Khoisan or Khoekhoen tribe, who collected seafood from the shores and deposited the shells in middens along the coast, which indicate use over the past 10,000 years. Bartolomeu Dias first referred to the bay, in 1488, as "the gulf between the mountains". The name "False Bay" was first used at least three hundred years ago by sailors who confused the bay with Table Bay to the north. According to Schirmer, the confusion arose because sailors returning from the east (the Dutch East Indies) initially confused Cape Point and Cape Hangklip, which are somewhat similar in form. Hangklip was known to early Portuguese seafarers as Cabo Falso, or False Cape, and the bay's name derives from the cape. Commercial fishing was started in the late 17th century, soon after settlement by the Dutch.

In 1672, the Dutch warship Goudvinck was stationed at the Cape and was instructed to survey False Bay, but it is not known how much was done before it was recalled. Simon van der Stel, who was appointed commander of the station in 1679, sailed False Bay in November 1687 on the galiot De Noord, took the earliest recorded soundings, and described the islands, reefs, and shoreline of the bay. By the end of the 17th century, the general bathymetry was known.

The Whittle Rock reef is named after a lieutenant Whittle of the Royal Navy, who surveyed parts of False Bay after HMS Indent was damaged off Miller's Point, soon after the first British occupation of the Cape in 1795.

Commercial fishing has been practiced in False Bay since the late 1600s. Over time, a range of fishing methods have been prohibited in False Bay. Demersal trawling, purse seining, and gillnetting were introduced in the 19th century but have been stopped because they deplete stocks, conflict with other fisheries and users, and damage the environment. Illegal gillnetting is still a problem.

Penguin eggs were collected until 1968, whaling operations took place until 1975, seals were hunted for fur until 1984, and guano was collected until 1991. All of these activities had a severely detrimental effect on the targeted populations and are now illegal. Commercial abalone diving has been severely restricted due to overfishing, but illegal exploitation continues. Recreational abalone extraction has been discontinued.

There have been symposia in 1968 and 1989 on the socio-ecological importance of False Bay, with reviews of the bay's oceanography and biology, as well as of human impacts on it.

=== Shipwrecks ===
Over the years, several ships have been wrecked in False Bay due to weather, war, navigational errors, other accidents, or intentional scuttling. These include:

Wrecked:

- 1691: Portuguese warship Sarpine, wrecked near Hottentot's Holland.
- 25 August 1778: British East Indiaman Colebrooke, wrecked south of the Steenbras River mouth, at 34°13.871′S 18°50.588′E
- 7 October 1786: Dutch East Indian schooner Catwyk aan Rhyn, driven ashore in a gale in Simon's Bay without loss of life.
- 16 October 1788: French frigate Pénélope.
- 16 May 1789: Dutch ship Drietal Handelaars.
- 28 September 1800: Sloop Benjamin, lost with all hands at Gordon's Bay.
- 1803: Dutch warship HNMS Bato, burned and sank in Simon's Bay at 34°10.998′S 18°25.560′E
- c. 2 September 1805: English East Indiaman Brunswick, wrecked at Long Beach in Simon's Bay at 34°10.880′S 18°25.607′E.
- 1810: British East Indiaman Euphrates, struck Whittle Rock but was repaired.
- 29 July 1816: Brig-sloop HMS Zebra (1815), was stranded, but not wrecked, in Simon's Bay; it was eventually wrecked on 2 December 1840, when a heavy gale drove it ashore and wrecked it off Mount Carmel near Haifa.
- 29 July 1816: Frigate HMS Revolutionnaire, stranded in Simon's Bay, but could not have been wrecked as it was broken up on 4 October 1822 after further service.
- 18 October 1816: Brig Camille, wrecked at Muizenberg beach.
- 1818: Vrouw Ida Alida, wrecked at Muizenberg.
- 25 October 1821: Waterloo, wrecked at Fish Hoek.
- 1823: Wooden sailing schooner Cockburn, wrecked on Muizenberg beach. Alternative dates from 3 to 6 April have been cited.
- 29 June 1828: Padang, wrecked in Simon's Bay.
- 12 July 1829: Phoenix, wrecked at Phoenix Shoal off Boulders Beach, Simon's Town on 19 July 1829 at 34°11.388′S 18°26.898′E.
- 10 January 1839: French whaler Le Protee, wrecked at Strandfontein.
- 27 July 1839: Barque Admiral Cockburn, wrecked at Muizenberg beach.
- 28 July 1841: Schooner Felix Vincidor, wrecked at Muizenberg beach.
- 12 February 1847: Robert, sprang a leak and was beached without loss of life near Gordon's Bay.
- 13 January 1850: Slaving barque Rowvonia, wrecked in Simon's Bay.
- 16 July 1862: Prussian barque Johanna Wagner, wrecked at Zandfontein near Muizenberg.
- November 1878: Benefactress, wrecked at Lourens River mouth, The Strand.
- 9 August 1897: Schooner Nukteris, wrecked at Buffels Bay just north of Cape Point.
- 21 November 1914: British turret steamer SS Clan Stuart, ran aground at Glencairn, 34°10.303′S 18°25.842′E
- HMS Trident, struck Whittle Rock and sank.

Scuttled:

- MV Rockeater, scuttled as an artificial reef in Smitswinkel Bay on 15 December 1972 at 34°16.127′S 18°28.890′E
- SAS Pietermaritzburg, scuttled as a recreational dive site just north of Millers Point at 34°13.303′S 18°28.465′E
- SAS Good Hope, scuttled as an artificial reef in Smitswinkel Bay at 34°16.054′S 18°28.850′E
- SAS Fleur, scuttled in central False Bay north of Whittle Rock at 34.1805°S 18.5649°E
- SAS Transvaal, scuttled as an artificial reef in Smitswinkel Bay at 34°16.005′S 18°28.761′E
- SAS Bloemfontein, scuttled in central False Bay at 34.2443°S 18.6659°E
- MFV Princess Elizabeth, scuttled as an artificial reef in Smitswinkel Bay at 34°16.068′S 18°28.839′E
- MFV Orotava, scuttled as an artificial reef in Smitswinkel Bay at 34°15.998′S 18°28.774′E
- Muizenberg Trawler wrecks, ST Bulby and ST Iolite, scuttled off Muizenberg at:
  - Western trawler wreck: 34°07.006′S 18°31.219′E
  - Eastern trawler wreck: 34°06.996′S 18°31.360′E
- ST Godetia, scuttled as an air-force training exercise off Macassar at about 34.1°S 18.73°E.
- SATS General Botha, scuttled in central False Bay east of Whittle Rock by gunfire from a battery at Simon's Town at 34°13.679′S 18°38.290′E

== Climate ==
The climate is Mediterranean, with warm, dry summers and cool, damp winters. In winter, gales and storms from the northwest are common and can be ferocious. False Bay is exposed to southeasterly winds in summer and its waters are approximately 6 °C (43 °F) warmer than those of Table Bay, owing to the influence of the warm Agulhas Current. The La Niña phase of the El Niño–Southern Oscillation cycle tends to increase rainfall in this region in the dry season (November to April).

=== Winds ===
The winds strongly influence the waves and water circulation and, through them, the sea surface temperature. The wind follows a characteristic pattern that shifts in latitude with the seasons and tracks the Rossby waves as they move eastwards over the southern ocean. A southwesterly wind follows the passage of a cold front as the anticyclone moves east and merges with the South Atlantic High, producing strong south-easterly winds. The high pressure cell moves further over the tip of Africa and splits off the South Atlantic High, with weakening south easterly winds, followed by a coastal low with north-westerly wind before the next cold front, bringing cool, wet westerly wind which passes around Table Mountain and converges as a northerly wind over the bay.

The South Atlantic High shifts latitude with the seasons, following the sun, which causes large variations in the wind pattern throughout the year. In summer, it moves south, and south-easterly winds dominate, with average strength in January and February. During winter, the northward shift allows the fronts to extend farther north, with stronger northwesterly winds and more frequent, heavier rain. The winter winds tend to be strongest in June and are generally northwesterly. The transition periods are April and September.

The El Niño–Southern Oscillation (ENSO) affects the winds and rainfall over this region. Sea surface temperatures off the west and south coasts of South Africa are affected by ENSO via changes in surface wind strength. During El Niño, the south-easterly winds driving upwelling are weaker, which results in warmer coastal waters than normal, while, during La Niña, the same winds are stronger and cause colder coastal waters. These effects on the winds are part of large-scale influences on the tropical Atlantic and the South Atlantic High-pressure system, and changes to the pattern of westerly winds further south. There are other influences not known to be related to ENSO that are similarly important. Some ENSO events do not lead to the expected changes.

Local variations in wind direction and strength are caused by interaction with the mountains on both sides of the bay. South-easterly winds are accelerated northwest of Cape Hangklip, and a distinct wind shadow can develop in the lee of the Kogelberg mountain. Northwesterly winds accelerate over Table Mountain and approach the bay from varying directions depending on the local topography. Temperature differences between land and water can also produce diurnal variations of wind speed and direction, particularly in summer.

Eastward-moving atmospheric Rossby waves move across the area at 3 to 20 day intervals, mostly in winter from May to September. The subtropical ridge is replaced by coastal lows, followed by northwesterly winds and frontal troughs that bring rain, stormy winds and seas, onshore transport, downwelling on the eastern shores, and mixing.

== Ecology and marine life ==
False Bay is at the extreme western end of the inshore Agulhas marine ecoregion which extends from Cape Point to the Mbashe River over the continental shelf, in the overlap zone between Cape Agulhas and Cape Point where the warm Agulhas Current and the cooler South Atlantic waters mix. The continental shelf is at its widest in this ecoregion, extending up to 240 km (150 mi) offshore on the Agulhas Bank, but is considerably narrower off False Bay. This ecoregion has the highest number of South African endemics and is a breeding area for many species. There are several important commercial fisheries in this region. The transition between the Agulhas ecoregion and the cooler Benguela ecoregion is at Cape Point, on the western boundary of False Bay.

There are two marine protected areas in False Bay: the Table Mountain National Park Marine Protected Area (TMNPMPA) lies on both sides of the Cape Peninsula, and so is partly in False Bay, and the Helderberg Marine Protected Area is off Macassar on the northern shoreline of the bay.

There are concerns about the effect the disappearance of great white sharks in False Bay will have on the local ecosystem, as the sharks serve as the main predators of the local Cape fur seal population. A government-appointed panel has reported that the appearance of orcas, commercial fishing, and climate change are likely the major contributing factors to the mass exodus of the sharks.

=== Reef ecosystems ===
Six feeding groups have been identified among the common suprabenthic fish species of False Bay, based on diet comparisons. These are: generalised benthic carnivores. carnivorous benthic browsers, herbivorous benthic grazers, midwater predators on small invertebrates, benthic macro-predators, and predators on small benthic invertebrates. These groups appear to eat mostly reef-dwelling prey, with the small amount of sand-dwelling prey assumed to be from areas adjacent to the reef. Feeding occurs mostly when water temperatures exceed 13 °C (55 °F). There is some dietary overlap between species but, in most cases, each species has a dietary niche, reducing competition for food within the assemblage.

=== Habitat types ===
The benthic habitat types listed for False Bay in the National Biodiversity Assessment are:

- Estuaries
- Estuarine shore
- Dissipative sandy coast
- Dissipative-intermediate sandy coast
- Intermediate sandy coast
- Reflective sandy coast
- Mixed shore
- Boulder shore
- Sheltered rocky coast
- Exposed rocky coast
- Very exposed rocky coast
- Sandy inshore
- Sandy inner shelf
- Hard inshore
- Hard inner shelf
- Hard outer shelf
- Reef
- Island buffer zone, and
- Harbour

=== Fauna ===
The marine animals of False Bay are diverse. The more popularly known species, which are a tourist draw, include white sharks, abalone, African penguins, snoek, yellowtail, many over-exploited line fish species and west coast rock lobster. Besides the resident species and several known migrants, the waters of the MPA are occasionally visited by vagrants carried in by the eddies of the Agulhas Current, which can bring tropical and subtropical specimens normally resident thousands of kilometres away.

Fauna found in the area include:

- Great white shark
- Cape fur seal
- Southern elephant seal (vagrant)
- Broadnose sevengill shark
- Cetaceans
  - Southern right whale
  - Humpback whale
  - Bryde's whale
  - Pygmy right whale
  - Heaviside's dolphin
  - Dusky dolphin
  - Indo-Pacific bottlenose dolphin
  - Indo-Pacific humpback dolphin
  - Long-beaked common dolphin
  - Killer whale (orca)
- Cape clawless otter
- Cape gannet
- African oystercatcher
- Whitecrested cormorant
- Crowned cormorant
- Cape Cormorant
- Grey heron
- Jackass penguin
- Hartlaub's gull
- Kelp gull
- Greyheaded gull
- Caspian tern
- Comon tern
- Sandwich tern
- Swift tern
- Damara tern

=== Seaweeds ===
Seaweeds are thousands of species of macroscopic, multicellular, marine algae of varied taxonomic classification. The term includes some types of Rhodophyta (red), Phaeophyta (brown) and Chlorophyta (green) macroalgae.

The seaweed ecology is unusually varied for an area of this size, as a result of the meeting of two major oceanic water masses near Cape Point, comprising two coastal marine bioregions. The ecology of the west or "Atlantic Seaboard" side of the Cape Peninsula is noticeably different in character and biodiversity to that of the east, or "False Bay" side. Both sides are classified as temperate waters, but there is a significant difference in average temperature: the Atlantic side is noticeably colder.

=== Algal blooms ===
False Bay has a high incidence of dinoflagellate blooms that may produce toxins or accumulate as red tides. The water retention and stratification of late summer and autumn produce the environment most conducive to harmful algal blooms. Algal blooms tend to propagate clockwise with the circulation, and may become trapped in the Gordon's Bay eddy for extended periods.

Brown discoloration in the surf zone along the north shore is frequently due to persistent blooms of the non-toxic diatom Anaulus australis, which is provided with nutrients from groundwater seepage through the sand bottom and river outfalls containing waste water from the nearby sewage purification systems.

=== Marine protected areas ===
The Table Mountain National Park Marine Protected Area is an inshore marine protected area around the Cape Peninsula. It was proclaimed in Government Gazette No. 26431 of 4 June 2004 in terms of the Marine Living Resources Act, 18 of 1998. The MPA is of value for conservation of a wide range of endemic species, and has considerable economic value as a tourist destination. It encloses a large number of recreational dive sites visited by residents and tourists from further afield. The shark and whale-watching tourism industries are also represented, and there are several popular surfing spots. The MPA is mainly a controlled zone where extractive activities are allowed under permit, with six small no-take zones. The MPA is administrated by the Table Mountain National Park, a branch of SANParks.

The marine ecology is unusually varied for an area of this size, as a result of the meeting of two major oceanic water masses near Cape Point, and the park extends into two coastal marine bioregions. The ecology of the west, or "Atlantic Seaboard," side of the park is noticeably different in character and biodiversity from that of the east, or "False Bay," side. Both sides are classified as temperate waters, but there is a significant difference in average temperature: the Atlantic side is noticeably colder. This MPA contains culturally significant fish traps, historical wrecks, and traditional fishing communities, and is also important for commercial fisheries. Part of the West Coast rock lobster industry takes place within the MPA, as do recreational and subsistence fishers, and an illegal poaching industry that mostly targets abalone, rock lobster, and territorial line fish from the no-take zones.

The Helderberg Marine Protected Area is a small marine conservation area on the north-eastern side of False Bay, between the mouths of the Lourens River in the Strand, and the Eerste River in Macassar. The Helderberg MPA is located in the warm-temperate Agulhas bioregion. The shoreline is a sandy beach with mobile dunes, and the seabed is a low sandstone reef with kelp beds and sand sediments. The areas nearest to the river mouths are in relatively poor condition, due to pollution of the river water. The beach inside the MPA is the most pristine part of the north shore of False Bay. The City of Cape Town administrates the MPA.

== Economic value ==
The harbours and slipways support the South African Navy, a small fishing industry, and a larger recreational boating community, including yachts, recreational fishing boats and recreational diving boats.

=== Harbours ===
There are harbours at:

- Simon's Town
  - Simon's Town naval base, with dry dock and syncrolift facilities
  - False Bay Yacht Club (marina and club trailer and travelift slipways, NSRI station 10)
- Kalk Bay (commercial fishing harbour, with rail slipway for repairs)
- Gordon's Bay (commercial fishing harbour, yacht club marina, NSRI station 9, and public trailer and rail slipways)
- Harbour Island marina (recreational boating marina and public trailer slipway)

=== Other slipways ===
- Buffels Bay (public trailer slipway inside the TMNP)
- Miller's Point (public trailer slipway for recreational and commercial ski-boats)
- Rumbly Bay (public trailer slipway for recreational ski-boats
- Rooiels (private trailer slipway for local ratepayers)

=== Jetties for public use ===
The City of Cape Town manages three public jetties in False Bay:

- The Strand Jetty was built in 1934 alongside the Strand slipway at 34°7′6″S 18°49′39″E
- The Harmony Park jetty is part of the Harmony Park resort and is used by visitors to the resort, at 34°8′21″S 18°50′46″E
- The Simon's Town Jetty is between the False Bay Yacht Club and the west section of the naval dockyard. It is accessible to the general public and used by eco-tourism operators (boat based whale watching, white shark viewing and site-seeing boat tours) and for refuelling small craft, at 34°11′32″S 18°26′0″E

=== Navigation ===
False Bay is not on any commercial navigational routes. Still, it is adjacent to one of the world's major trade routes, in a region notorious for storms. It can provide shelter from wind and sea from most directions, with good anchoring ground in Simon's Bay that is sheltered from westerly winds and seas common in winter. It is occasionally used as shelter by smaller vessels or by damaged large vessels, but there are no commercial repair facilities. There have been several occasions where large damaged ships sought refuge in the bay.

=== Extractive exploitation of resources ===
The only current commercial fisheries remaining in False Bay are linefishing for pelagic snoek and yellowtail and demersal species hottentot, kob, white stumpnose, geelbek, and roman, trapping of West Coast rock lobster, and beach-seine (also known as trek-net) fishing. There are experimental fisheries, such as for octopus, but this has been controversial due to the entanglement of whales in the trap recovery lines. The demersal shark longline fishery also occasionally operates on the southeastern side of the bay.

Commercial line-fishing remains mostly hand-line fishing using baited lines. In the mid 1980s, regulations and a licensing system were introduced. In the last decade of the 20th century, line fish catches along the South African coast declined to the extent that emergency measures were declared to protect the remaining stock. Licensing systems were revised to establish a sustainable commercial boat-based fishery, restricted to 316 boats between Port Nolloth and Cape Infanta. Catch limits apply to most species, except snoek, which is now by far the largest part of the reported catch. Catches have become relatively stable since the early 2000s, though white stumpnose have continued to decline.

Recreational fishing is the largest and most economically important fishery in the bay. It includes boat-based angling and shore angling, both from the rocky coast and from sandy beaches, and angling in estuaries, spearfishing, and cast netting. In the first part of the 20th century, most shore angling was for reef fish from the rocky east and west coasts of the bay. Still, a decline in the targeted species on the shoreline reefs and availability of four-wheel drive vehicles led to a move towards beach angling from the northern shore and targeting kob, white steenbras, and slender bellman. Catches have declined, and sports fishers increasingly target elasmobranchs. There has also been a move towards catch-and-release, and recent catch limits and closed areas in marine protected areas have slightly reduced pressure, but the stocks of the top five target species have continued to decline.

The beach-seine or trek-net fishery has provided fish for over 300 years. For much of that time, it has conflicted with other fisheries, some of which have been discontinued. Before 1975, there were more than 100 licensed operators, but this number has since been reduced to only five as of 2019. Despite claims that the fishery is detrimental to stocks, large quantities of juveniles and other bycatch are affected, and the nets damage the benthic ecosystem, an investigation found that the license holders had a right to continue targeting traditional species and that the impacts on the ecosystem are insignificant. Traditional fishing communities account for a large part of the traditional line-fish, lobster, and beach-seine fisheries, as crew or rights-holders, or by illegal fishing. Snoek and harder are important parts of the informal trade system in traditional fishing communities and contribute to local food security.

Chondrichthyans were traditionally a minor component of the catch or were often bycatch, but have recently become the target of the demersal shark longline fishery and are now more likely to be retained in other fisheries, raising concern about whether exploitation levels are sustainable.

The commercially important West Coast rock lobster fishery was historically concentrated on the west coast, but catches east of Cape Point have increased since 1990, partly due to an eastward shift in the lobster population and partly due to declines in the west coast stock resulting from overexploitation and habitat degradation. Still, the portion caught in False Bay remains a small part of the total catch. The population has recovered slightly, but the long-term survival of the resource is compromised by extensive illegal fishing and excessive allocations by the authorities.

The abalone fishery was historically concentrated east of False Bay, and a high level of poaching and ecological impacts from the lobster population shift have led to severe reductions in abalone stocks, resulting in the closure of the commercial fishery between 2008 and 2009. The recreational lobster fishery has been severely reduced, and the recreational abalone fishery has been closed altogether since 2003.

Other invertebrates that are harvested in the bay under the permit system include mussels and clams, giant turban shells (alikreukel), and various limpets. Experimental fisheries have included whelks, crabs, and octopus.

The sea bamboo kelp Ecklonia maxima is harvested as whole kelp, kelp fronds, and stranded drift, for use as feed for farmed abalone and as a plant growth stimulant, in quantities considered far below the sustainable yield. No other seaweeds are harvested commercially in False Bay.

All of False Bay, inside a line between the lighthouse at Cape Point and the lighthouse at Cape Hangklip, is closed to trawling, purse seining, longlining, and the use of lobster traps.

=== Recreational pursuits and tourism ===
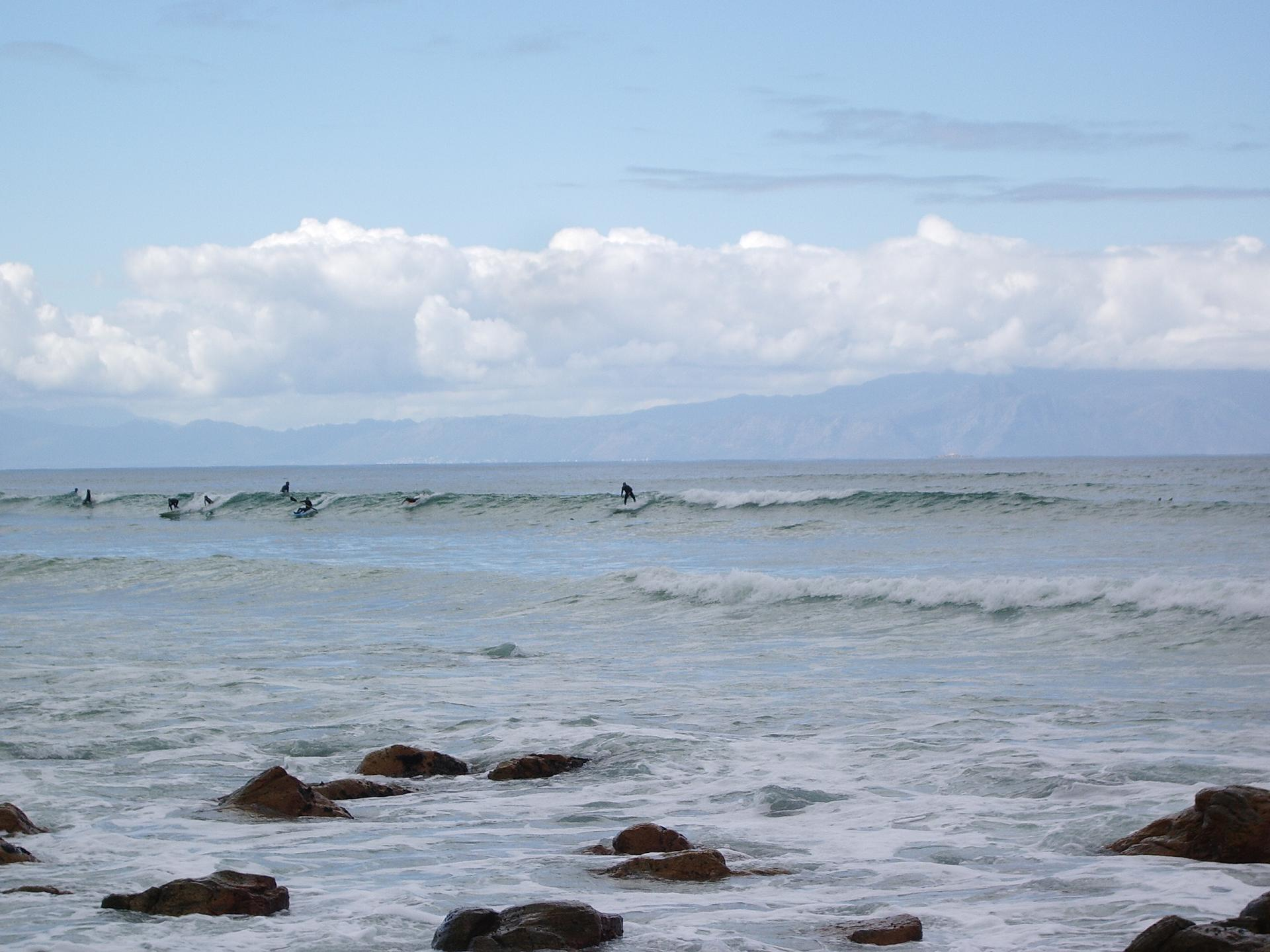
Surfers Corner; A popular surfing spot at Muizenberg in the northwest corner of False Bay

Fishing can be good in False Bay, and at times there are large schools of snoek, an oily, barracuda-like fish that is much sought after locally, and yellowtail. Angling from the rocky shores to either side of the bay is very popular, but can be dangerous. The shape of the seabed at the mouth of the bay creates interference patterns in the swells that come in from the Southern Ocean, and these patterns occasionally combine to cause "killer waves" to rise without obvious warning and to sweep the sandstone ledges well above the high tide mark. Several rock anglers have been swept away and drowned over the years, but this seems to have done little to dampen enthusiasm for the sport.

Sailing is also a popular recreational activity in False Bay. The sailing clubs in False Bay include False Bay Yacht Club in Simon's Town, Fish Hoek Beach Sailing Club at the main beach in Fish Hoek, Gordon's Bay Yacht Club in the Gordon's Bay Harbour, and Hottentots Holland Beach Sailing Club in Strand. The moorings at the False Bay Yacht club are well protected from south easterly waves, as they are in the lee of the naval base harbour, and are in the lee of the peninsula for westerly waves, and the water is relatively deep. The marina at Harbour Island in Gordon's Bay is protected against swells from all directions. Still, the entrance and inshore approaches are exposed to large south-westerly seas. Gordon's Bay harbour is largely silted up by sand, and access by keeled sailing yachts is limited by draught and tide.

There is a small granite island in the bay called Seal Island, which is one of the main breeding sites for the Cape fur seal. The seals attract many great white sharks, and some of the largest sharks ever recorded have been spotted in these waters. These sharks are famous for breaching the surface while attacking seals, sometimes jumping entirely out of the water. Despite this, swimming, surfing, sailing, scuba diving and freediving are popular pastimes around the bay, at centres such as Muizenberg, Kalk Bay, Smitswinkel Bay, Strand and Gordon's Bay. Shark attacks are uncommon but not unknown, with two deaths since 2010. Sightings of great white sharks have decreased in recent years; it is believed that competition between the sharks and a population of orca in the region may be responsible.

Tourism relating to False Bay makes a significant contribution to the region's economy, providing revenue from whale watching, shark-cage diving, and other water sports.

==== Beaches ====
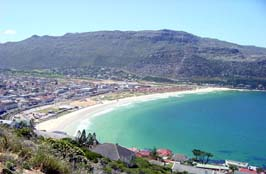
Fish Hoek beach

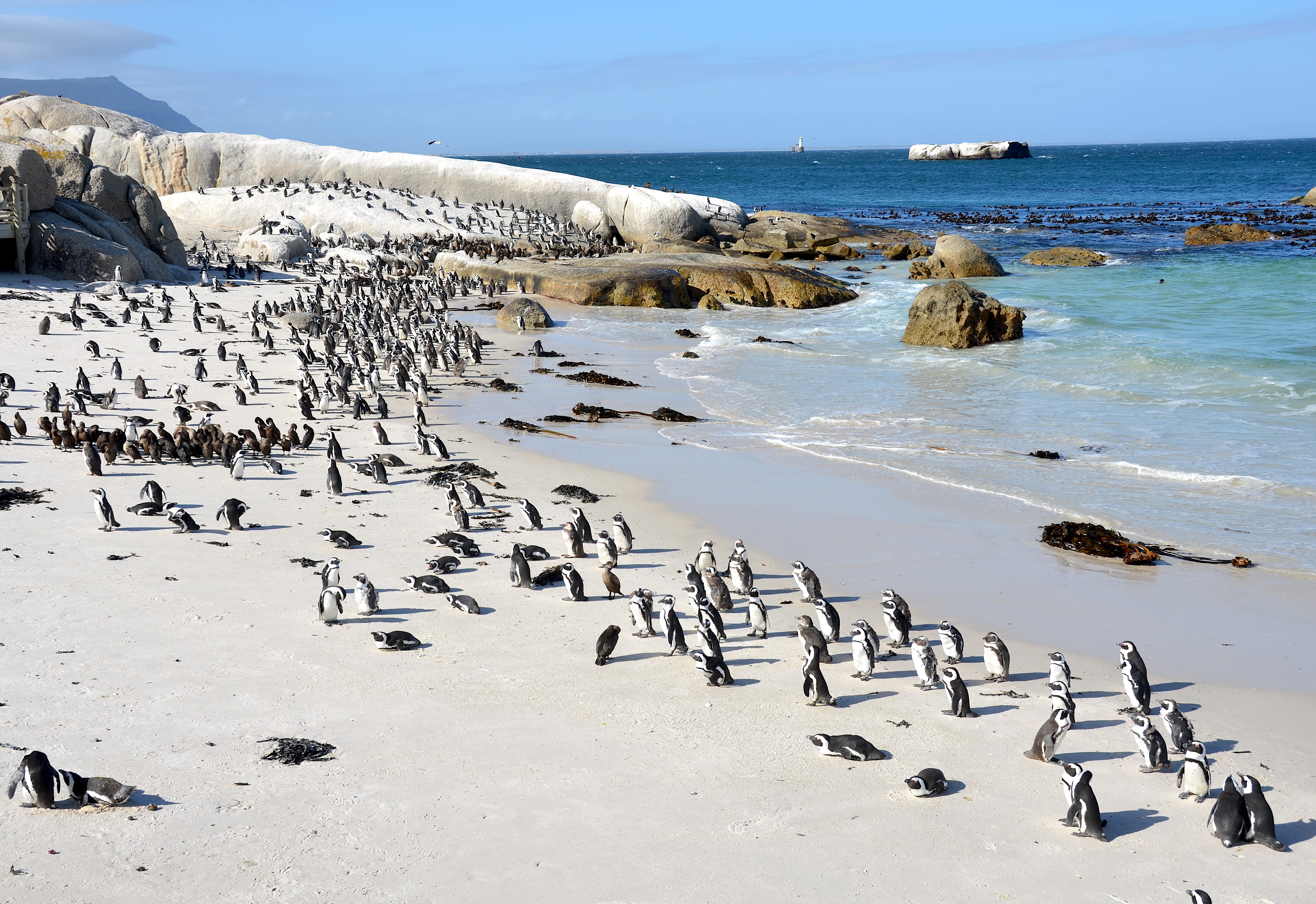
Boulders Beach populated with African Penguins

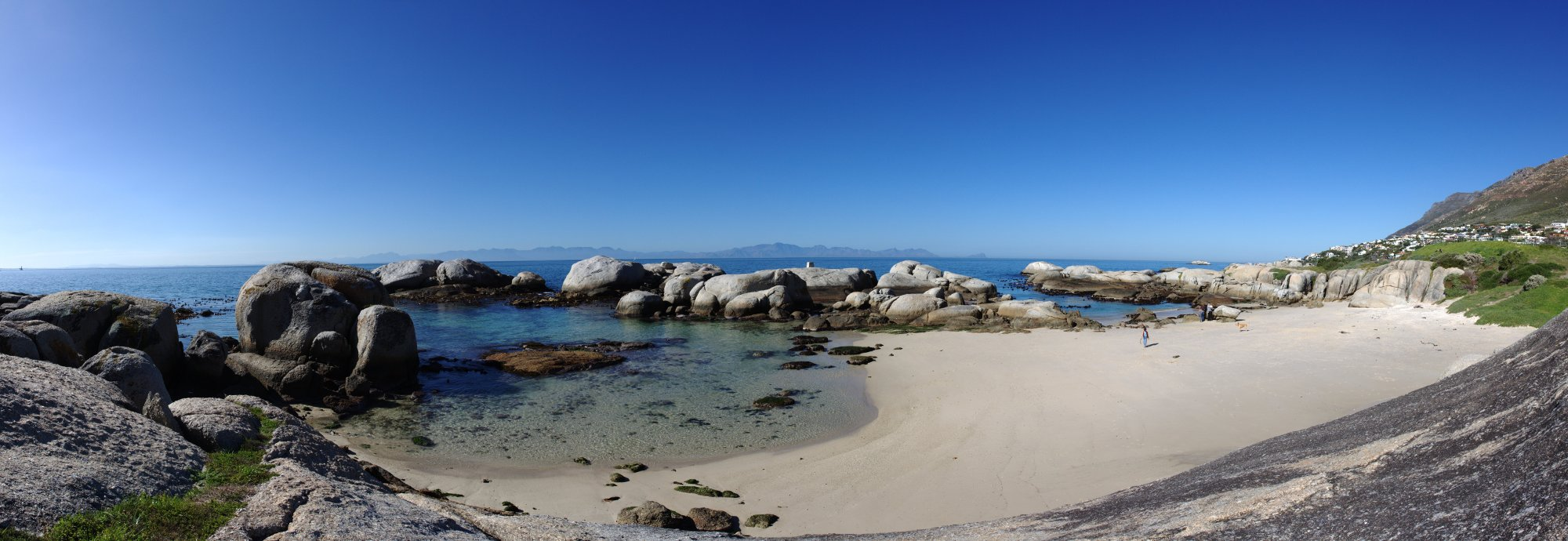
Windmill Beach

A long sandy beach runs more or less uninterrupted for the complete width of False Bay from Muizenberg to Gordon's Bay, forming the coast of the Cape Flats. Along the rocky Cape Peninsula, there are several smaller beaches below the mountains which are more protected from westerly swells than the beaches of the north shore. There is also a long sandy beach on the east side of the bay at the foot of the Kogelberg.

- Buffels Bay, Cape Peninsula
- Smitswinkel Bay
- Fishermans Beach
- Froggy Pond
- Windmill Beach is a small sandy beach below the golf course at Froggy Pond, Simon's Town. It is surrounded by large rounded granite boulders, and has two small coves separated by a group of large boulders. The south cove is relatively narrow and deeper, and opens to the bay towards the east. The north cove is wider, shallower and very protected from swell. It is a safe swimming area. The south cove is a popular site for scuba diving and is often used for entry-level training as the water is protected and entry and exit are easy.
- Boulders Beach
- Long Beach, Simon's Town
- Glencairn
- Fish Hoek
- Kalk Bay
- St James
- Muizenberg
- Strandfontein
- Monwabisi Beach, Khayelitsha
- Macassar beach
- Strand
- Gordon's Bay
- Kogel Bay (Kogelbaai), south of Gordon's Bay, near Rooiels.

==== Surfing ====
False Bay is open to the south, and the prevailing open ocean swell arrives from the southwest, so the exposure varies considerably around the coastline. The inshore bathymetry near Cape Point is shallow enough for a moderate amount of refraction of long-period swell, but deep enough to have less effect on short-period swell, and acts as a filter to pass mainly the longer swell components to the Western shores, although they are significantly attenuated. The eastern shores get more of the open ocean spectrum, and this results in very different swell conditions between the two sides at any given time.

The fetch is generally too short for southeasterly winds to produce good surf. The named breaks in False Bay, clockwise from Cape Point to Hangklip, are:

- Buffels Bay: Right hand point break. Works in very large open-ocean swells. Suddenly jacks and barrels along a shallow reef for about 200 m.
- Black Rocks: Right-hand reef break, which also needs a large open ocean swell
- Glencairn: Left-hand break, which also needs a large open ocean swell
- Fish Hoek
- Clovelly: A short left-hand reef break that works at low tide with a clean 0.9 to 1.2 m swell
- Kalk Bay Reef: Hollow left-hand reef break.
- Kalk Bay Backdoor: Hollow right-hand reef break on the other side of Kalk Bay reef.
- Danger Reef: A left and right peak on a rocky ledge. Also suitable for bodyboarding.
- St James: Right reef break near the tidal pool. A three- to four-foot wave that looks like it will close out, but holds for a while until it reaches very shallow water.
- Bailey's Reef: A short, hollow right-hand reef break.
- Surfers' Corner: Popular break with longboarders. Not as powerful as West Coast breaks. On a three- to four-foot south swell, there is an outside break and an inside break. Malibu boards keep enough momentum to keep going all the way through. In a big swell, there is a lot of white water to cross to reach the backline.
- Rivermouth
- Sunrise: Beach break.
- Cemetery
- Nine Miles Reef
- Monwabisi:l
- Pipe
- Bikini Beach: Left-hand point break off Gordon's Bay harbour wall.
- Caves (Koeël Bay): Beach break on a shifting sandbar. Tends to close out.
- Koeël Bay Beach
- Paranoia: Left-hand point reef at the end of Koeël Bay, breaking very close to the rocks. Works in clean, evenly spaced swell. Not for beginners.
- Off the Mountain
- Pringle Bay
- Moonlight Bay

==== Recreational scuba diving ====
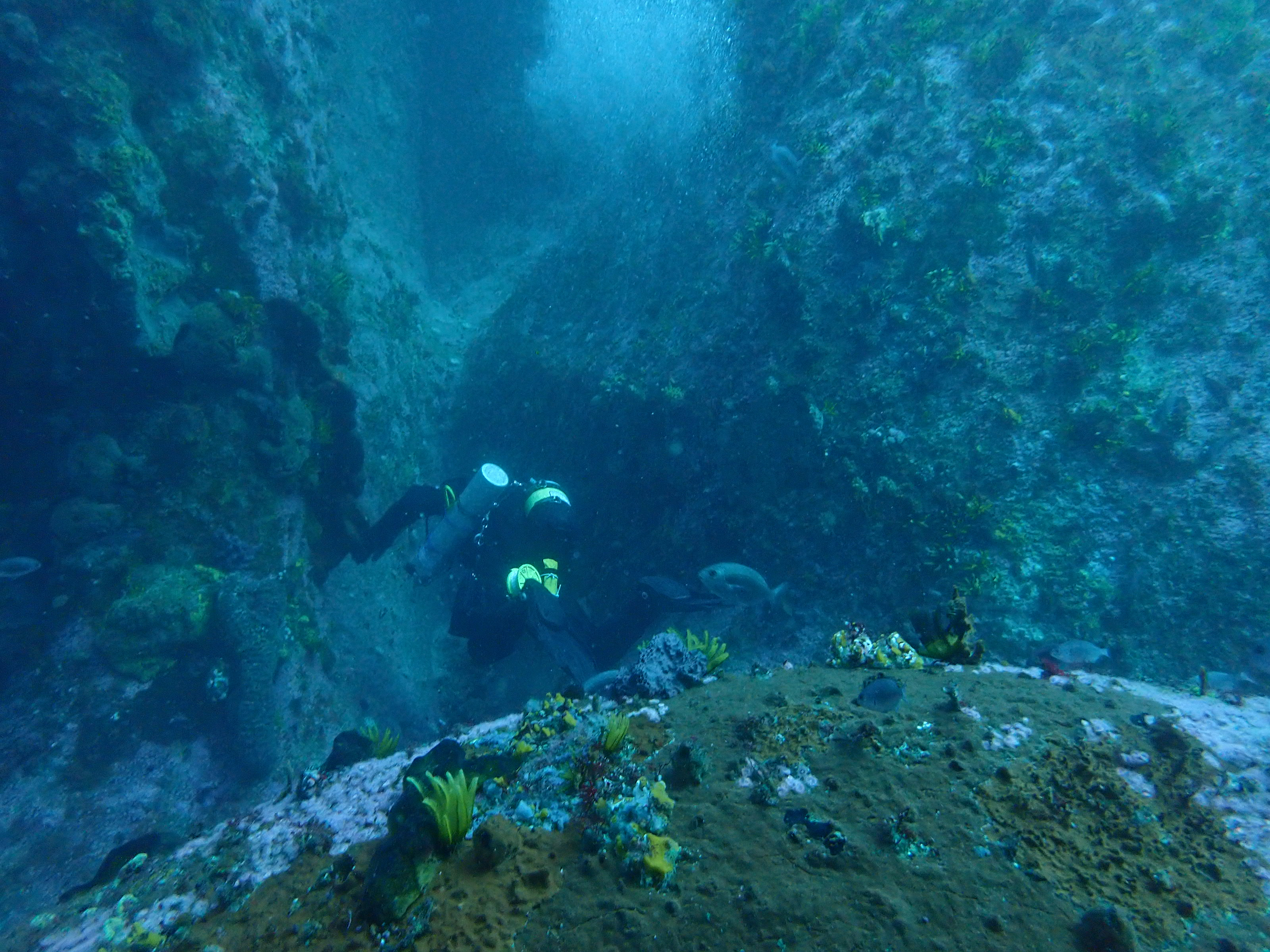
Recreational scuba diving at Whittle Rock reef

Most of the recreational dive sites of False Bay are in the Table Mountain National Park Marine Protected Area. A permit is required to scuba dive in any MPA in South Africa. These permits are valid for a year and are available at some branches of the Post Office. Temporary permits, valid for a month, may be available at dive shops or from dive boat operators who operate in an MPA. A personal recreational scuba diving permit is valid in all South African MPAs where recreational diving is allowed. The business permit to operate recreational scuba business operations in an MPA is restricted to a specific MPA. Diving for commercial or scientific purposes is also subject to a permit.

===== Named dive sites =====
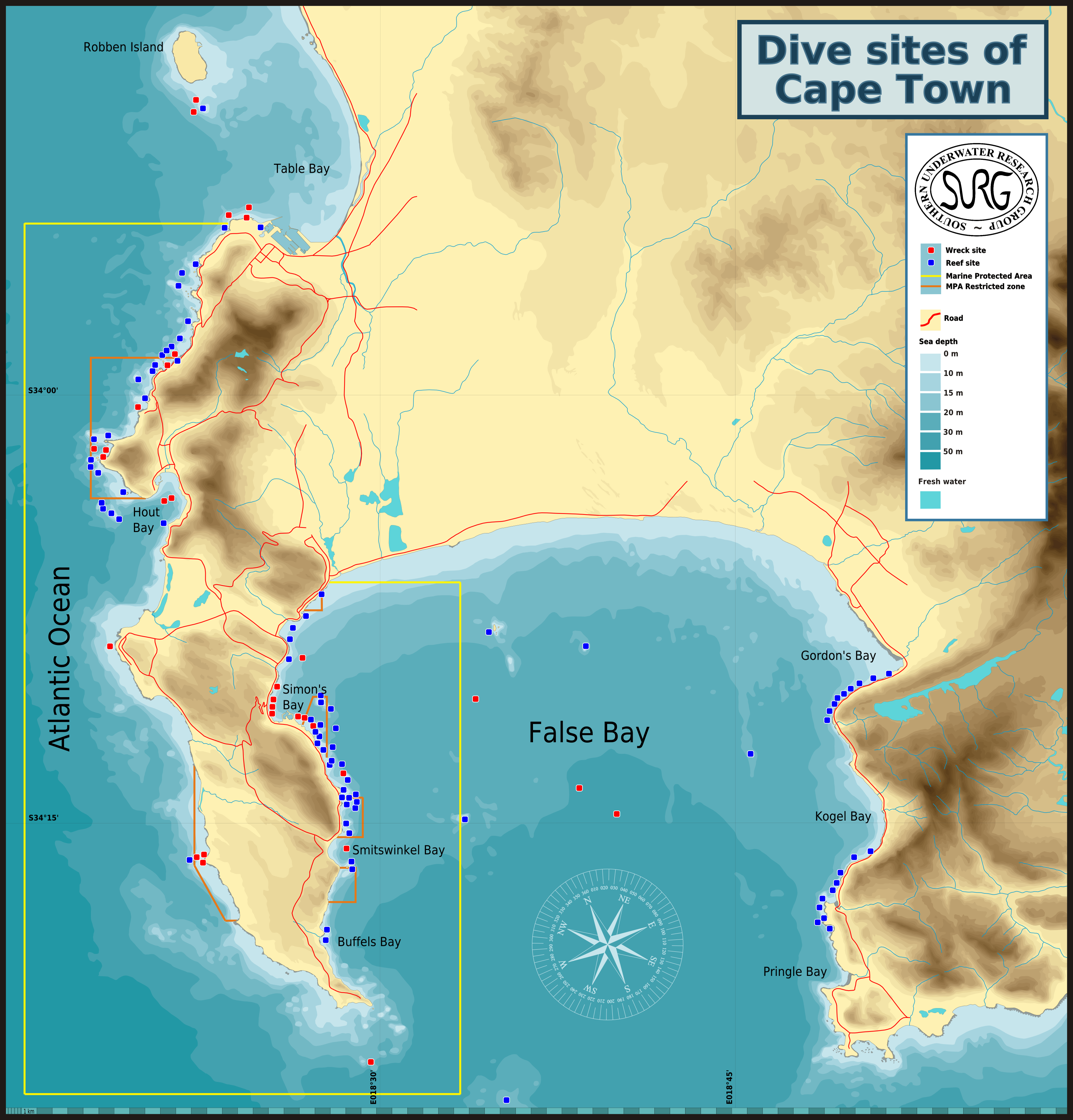
Map showing the distribution of most of the wreck and reef dive sites of the Cape Town local area

False Bay has numerous rocky reefs and wreck recreational dive sites, which have been identified by position and named. Some of them are listed here for the west coast of the bay from north to south (within the TMNPMPA), for offshore parts of the bay, and for the east coast of the bay, also from north to south, roughly following the coastline where relevant:

False Bay west:

- Muizenberg Trawler wrecks:
  - Western trawler wreck: 34°07.006′S 18°31.219′E
  - Eastern trawler wreck: 34°06.996′S 18°31.360′E
- Dale Brook: 34°07.436′S 18°27.154′E
- Kalk Bay Harbour Wall: 34°07.787′S 18°26.967′E
- Fish Hoek Reef: 34°03.54′S 18°20.82′E
- Sunny Cove: 34°08.68′S 18°26.30′E
- Quarry: 34°09.390′S 18°26.157′E
- Quarry Barge: 34°09.385′S 18°26.477′E
- Glencairn Fan Garden: 34°09.418′S 18°26.412′E
- P87 wreck: 34°09.570′S 18°26.420′E
- SS Clan Stuart wreck: 34°10.303′S 18°25.842′E
- East Indiaman Brunswick wreck: 34°10.880′S 18°25.607′E
- HMNS Bato wreck: 34°10.998′S 18°25.560′E
- Long Beach: 34°11.239′S 18°25.559′E
- Simon's Town Jetty: 34°11.525′S 18°26.597′E
- False Bay Yacht Club: 34°11.527′S 18°26.048′E
- Target Reef: 34°10.619′S 18°27.226′E
- Livingstone Reef: 34°10.605′S 18°27.571′E
- Castor Rock northern pinnacle: 34°10.687′S 18°27.590′E
- North Friskies: 34°10.720′S 18°27.830′E
- Castor Rock: 34°10.74′S 18°27.61′E
- Friskies Pinnacle: 34°10.778′S 18°27.822′E
- Wonders Pinnacle: 34°10.810′S 18°27.650′E
- Roman's Rest: 34°10.835′S 18°27.805′E
- Roman Rock: 34°10.87′S 18°27.60′E
- Spider crab Reef: 34°10.890′S 18°27.430′E
- Tivoli Pinnacles: 34°10.892′S 18°27.765′E
- Rambler Rock Northwest: 34°10.924′S 18°27.899′E
- Rambler Rock Northeast: 34°10.916′S 18°27.996′E
- Rambler Rock Southern Pinnacle: 34°11.011′S 18°27.918′E
- Hotlips Pinnacle: 34°11.146′S 18°28.091′E
- Dome Rock: 34°11.119′S 18°27.776′E
- Ammunition Barges wrecks: 34°11.408′S 18°26.985′E
- Phoenix shoal: 34°11.388′S 18°26.898′E
- Noah's Ark and the Ark Rock Wrecks: 34°11.533′S 18°27.232′E
- Penguin Point (Boulders): 34°11.889′S 18°27.254′E
- Maidstone Rock: 34°11.581′S 18°27.466′E
- Anchor Reef (Maidstone Reef): 34°11.575′S 18°27.600′E
- Ammo Reef: 34°11.564′S 18°27.754′E
- Photographer's Reef (JJM Reef): 34°11.839′S 18°27.434′E
- Torch Reef: 34°11.700′S 18°27.960′E
- Outer Photographer's Reef: 34°11.778′S 18°27.898′E
- Dangerous Doug reef: 34°11.950′S 18°27.650′E
- Lace Reef: 34°11.960′S 18°28.125′E
- Windmill offshore: 34°12.050′S 18°28.800′E
- Windmill Beach: 34°12.06′S 18°27.40′E
- Froggy pond: 34°12.22′S 18°27.40′E
- Fisherman's Beach: 34°12.357′S 18°27.497′E
- A-Frame (Oatlands Point): 34°12.484′S 18°27.662′E
- D-Frame (Oatlands Reef, Wave Rock): 34°12.378′S 18°27.996′E
- Insanity Reef: 34°12.817′S 18°28.044′E
- Rocklands Blinder (Seal Colony): 34°12.9′S 18°28.0′E
- Spaniard Rock: 34°13.03′S 18°28.03′E
- Alpha Reef (Outer Spaniard): 34°12.987′S 18°28.184′E
- Omega Reef: 34°12.855′S 18°28.435′E
- Stern Reef: 34°13.164′S 18°28.032′E
- SAS Pietermaritzburg wreck: 34°13.303′S 18°28.465′E
- PMB Pinnacles: 34°13.311′S 18°28.564′E
- North Caravan: 34°13.353′S 18°28.733′E
- Caravan Central: 34°13.435′S 18°28.547′E
- South Caravan: 34°13.513′S 18°28.721′E
- Inner Caravan: 34°13.500′S 18°28.450′E
- Miller's Point Slipway: 34°13.822′S 18°28.411′E
- Miller's Point tidal pool: 34°13.879′S 18°28.559′E
- Rumbly Bay: 34°14.059′S 18°28.494′E
- Murphy's: 34°13.956′S 18°28.986′E
- Boat Rock (Bakoven Rock): 34°14.05′S 18°29.05′E
- Festival Pinnacle: 34°14.140′S 18°29.015′E
- Fan Reef: 34°14.165′S 18°29.260′E
- Shark Alley: 34°14.21′S 18°28.60′E
- Pyramid Rock: 34°14.236′S 18°28.698′E
- Castle Pinnacles: 34°14.356′S 18°28.826′E
- Sansui Reef (Japanese Gardens):
- Castle Rocks Point Reefs (Outside Castle): 34°14.4′S 18°28.8′E
- Castle Rocks North Side: 34°14.322′S 18°28.65′E
- Inner Castle (South Castle): 34°14.46′S 18°28.674′E
- Outer Castle (Blindevals): 34°14.320′S 18°29.002′E
- Phone Reef: 34°14.226′S 18°29.202′E
- Giant's Castle: 34°14.358′S 18°29.226′E
- North Pie Rock Reef: 34°14.375′S 18°29.075′E
- East Pie Rock Pinnacles: 34°14.432′S 18°29.153′E
- West Pie Rock Reef: 34°14.396′S 18°28.943′E
- South Pie Rock Pinnacles: 34°14.445′S 18°29.985′E
- Whittle Rock Peter's Ridge: 34°14.800′S 18°33.160′E
- Whittle Rock Stingray Central (Bruce's Reef): 34°14.832′S 18°33.324′E
- Whittle Rock Western Reef Pinnacle: 34°14.856′S 18°33.269′E
- Whittle Rock Far Southwest Pinnacle: 34°14.881′S 18°33.241′E
- The Jambles: 34°14.885′S 18°28.890′E
- Graeme's Spot: 34°14.903′S 18°28.917′E
- Finlay's Point (Jenga Reef): 34°14.959′S 18°28.611′E
- Finlay's Pinnacle: 34°14.97′S 18°28.78′E
- Carnaby Street Pinnacle: 34°14.985′S 18°28.92′E
- Finlay's Deep: 34°15.005′S 18°29.194′E
- Atlantis Reef: 34°15.075′S 18°29.027′E
- Sherwood Forest: 34°15.190′S 18°29.01′E
- Fish Tank: 34°15.230′S 18°28.930′E
- Partridge Point Seal Rock: 34°15.337′S 18°28.892′E
- Deep Partridge: 34°15.337′S 18°28.930′E
- Dave's Caves: 34°15.378′S 18°28.704′E
- Partridge Point Big Rock: 34°15.465′S 18°28.788′E
- Peter's Pinnacles: 34°15.515′S 18°28.687′E
- SAS Transvaal wreck: 34°16.005′S 18°28.761′E
- MFV Oratava wreck: 34°15.998′S 18°28.774′E
- MFV Princess Elizabeth wreck: 34°16.068′S 18°28.839′E
- SAS Good Hope wreck: 34°16.054′S 18°28.850′E
- Good Hope Reef: 34°16.049′S 18°28.893′E
- MV Rockeater wreck: 34°16.127′S 18°28.890′E
- Kreef Reef: 34°16.360′S 18°28.780′E
- Horseshoe Reef: 34°16.410′S 18°28.940′E
- Smits Reef: 34°16.486′S 18°28.929′E
- Batsata Maze: 34°16.517′S 18°29.017′E
- Smits Reef West Pinnacle: 34°16.495′S 18°28.863′E
- Smits Cliff (Hell's Gate): 34°16.48′S 18°28.41′E
- Batsata Rock: 34°16.602′S 18°28.830′E
- Bordjiesrif: 34°18.99′S 18°27.83′E
- Buffels Bay: 34°19.217′S 18°27.73′E
- Anvil Rock pinnacle: 34°22.218′S 18°30.910′E
- Anvil Rock caves: 34°22.224′S 18°31.068′E

False Bay offshore:

- Seal Island: 34.138°S 18.580°E, (shark cage diving)
- Drop Zone: 34.1427°S 18.7638°E
- East shoal: 34.1483°S 18.6464°E
- Moddergat: 34.1525°S 18.8275°E
- York shoal: 34.156°S 18.593°E
- SAS Fleur wreck: 34.1805°S 18.5649°E
- Steenbras Deep North pinnacle: 34.2023°S 18.7595°E
- Steenbras Deep South pinnacle: 34.2107°S 18.7583°E
- SATS General Botha wreck: 34.2280°S 18.6382°E
- Blue Flame Pinnacles34.210617°S 18.555933°E
- SAS Bloemfontein wreck: 34.2443°S 18.6659°E
- Off-Whittle Ridge: 34°14.364′S 18°34.847′E
- Whittle Rock reefs:
  - Kelly's Anchor: 34°14.687′S 18°33.612′E
  - Riaan and Sven's anchor: 34°14.735′S 18°33.590′E
  - East Ridge North Pinnacle: 34°14.742′S 18°33.843′E
  - North-west corner pinnacles: 34°14.750′S 18°33.482′E
  - September anchor: 34°14.762′S 18°33.575′E
  - Whittle Rock North-west Pinnacle: 34°14.765′S 18°33.622′E
  - Euphrates anchors: 34°14.776′S 18°33.801′E, 34°14.783′S 18°33.790′E and 34°14.783′S 18°33.795′E
  - Billy's anchor: 34°14.777′S 18°33.734′E
  - JJ's anchor: 34°14.781′S 18°33.720′E
  - Little anchor: 34°14.785″S 18°33.666′E
  - Criss-cross Cracks: 34°14.830′S 18°33.879′E
  - Whittle Rock West Pinnacle: 34°14.844′S 18°33.682′E
  - Whittle Rock (Shallowest pinnacle): 34°14.846′S 18°33.714′E, about 8 km offshore
  - Whaleback Pinnacles: 34°14.850′S 18°33.508′E
  - Whittle Rock Western Reef Pinnacle: 34°14.856′S 18°33.269′E, inside the TMNPMPA
  - Marc's anchor: 34°14.856′S 18°33.716′E
  - Whittle Rock South-east Pinnacle: 34°14.887′S 18°33.775′E
  - Whaleback Rock: 34°14.900′S 18°33.635′E
  - South east pinnacle chain (Neptune's bath plug): 34°14.917′S 18°33.753′E
  - Flash pinnacle: 34°14.931′S 18°33.718′E
  - Georgina's anchor: 34°14.935′S 18°33.784′E
  - M&M Tower (the Spark plug): 34°14.943′S 18°33.549′E
  - Cave Complex reef: 34°14.943′S 18°33.616′E
  - Bus Stop (the Gnarly wall): 34°14.945′S 18°33.573′E
  - Wreckless Rock and the Little Labyrinth: 34°14.949′S 18°33.707′E
  - Table Top pinnacle: 34°14.968′S 18°33.668′E
  - Mossie's Cave and pinnacle: 34°14.972′S 18°33.420′E
  - Grant's Spike (South-western pinnacles): 34°14.991′S 18°33.450′E
  - Labyrinth: 34°15.004′S 18°33.580′E
  - Labyrinth South Pinnacle: 34°15.048′S 18°33.606′E
  - Deep South Pinnacle: 34°15.103′S 18°33.603′E
- Bruce's Mark 34.248000°S 18.581333°E
- Deep South Whittle Reef34.273567°S 18.566817°E

False Bay east:

- Bikini Beach: 34.1654°S 18.8582°E
- Ledges: 34.1699°S 18.8454°E
- Vogelsteen: 34.1715°S 18.8396°E
- Cow and Calf (Koei en Kalf): 34.1726°S 18.8377°E
- Stone Dog: 34.1726°S 18.8364°E
- Pinnacle: 34.1745°S 18.8330°E
- Lorry Bay: 34.1826°S 18.8219°E
- Phil's Bay: 34.1867°S 18.8189°E
- Noble Reef: 34.1889°S 18.8187°E
- Rocky Bay: 34.1921°S 18.8160°E
- Blousteen East: 34.2718°S 18.8372°E
- Blousteen: 34.2743°S 18.8352°E
- Blousteen Ridge: 34.2750°S 18.8321°E
- Whirlpool Cove: 34.2828°S 18.8258°E
- Percy's Hole Cave: 34.2866°S 18.8249°E
- Percy's Hole: 34.2881°S 18.8224°E
- Kruis (Crosses): 34.2898°S 18.8213°E
- Rooi-els Point: 34.2952°S 18.8127°E
- Coral Gardens, Rooi-els: 34.3020°S 18.8123°E
- Andre se Gat: 34.3042°S 18.8127°E
- Balcony: 34.3074°S 18.8147°E
- Ankers: 34.3084°S 18.8124°E
- Mike's Reef: 34.3123°S 18.8126°E
- Container Bay: 34.3128°S 18.8170°E

==== Shark and whale watching ====
Shore and boat-based tourism activities involving ecologically responsible observation of great white sharks and various cetaceans are a small local industry.

The shark-watching industry centers on boat trips to Seal Island by licensed operators, in the hope of seeing breaching predation of seals by great white sharks. Since the major reduction in the shark population attributed to orcas, particularly the two large males named Port and Starboard, the shark watching industry in the bay has declined. Before 2015, False Bay was well known for its large population of great white sharks, but by 2020, sightings were reduced to nearly zero. The tourist attraction of shark cage diving has ceased in recent years without the appearance of great whites, impacting the local economy.

== Naval base at Simon's Town ==
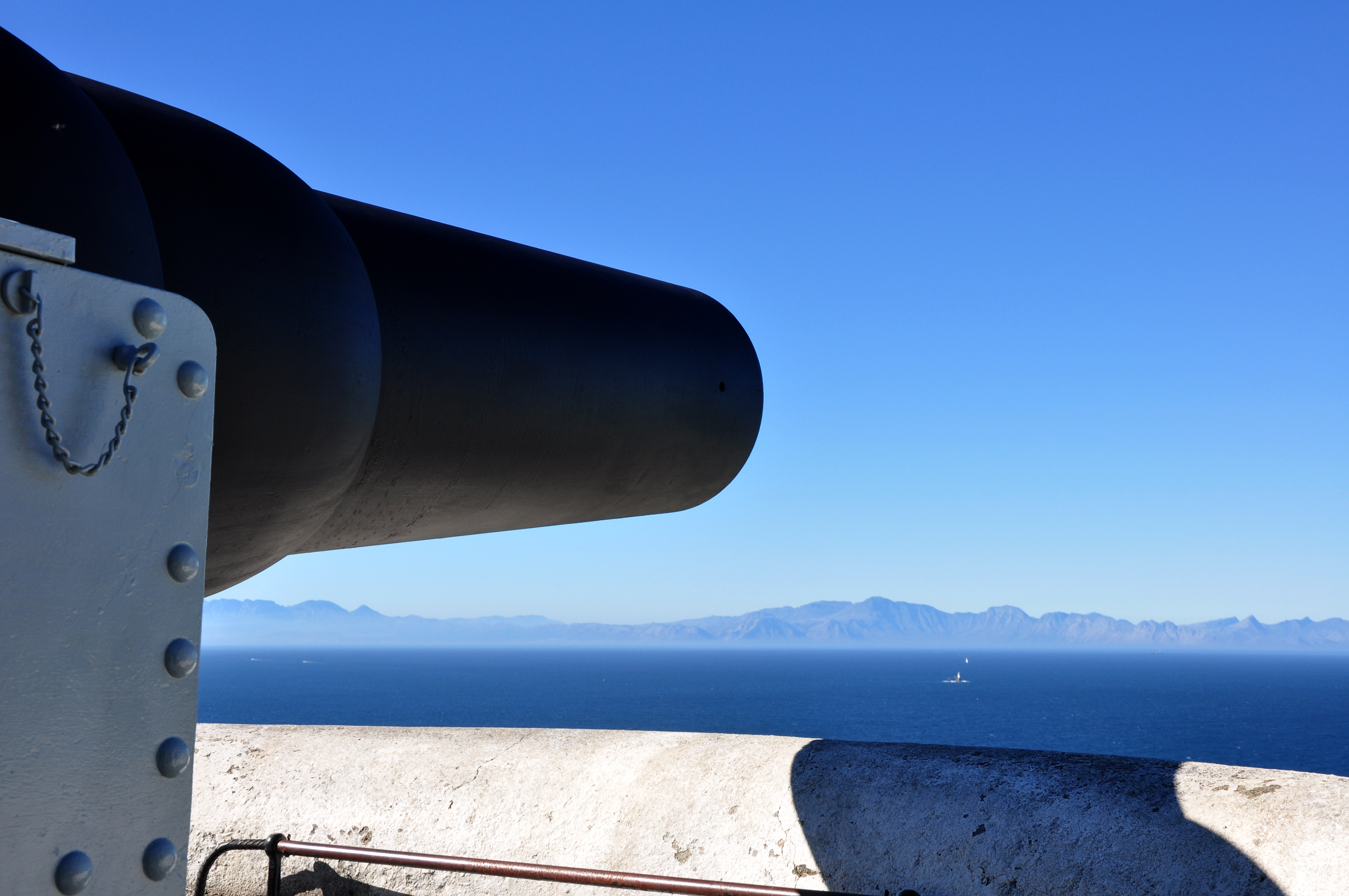
A historic 9 inch gun overlooking False Bay installed at Simon's Town in the 1800s by the British to defend the bay

The famous naval base of Simon's Town is in Simon's Bay, about halfway down the length of the False Bay coast of the Cape Peninsula. During the Second World War, many heavy guns were mounted in concrete bunkers at various points along the mountainous shores of False Bay to deter attacks on Simon's Town. The firepower and defensive situation of these weapons were formidable, and no attack was ever mounted. Although some of the guns were removed decades ago, a few large guns are still emplaced on the hillsides near the Redhill road. The Lower North battery at the bottom of Redhill Road is used for naval gunnery training and features a few examples of currently used weapon systems.

== Rescue services ==
There are four National Sea Rescue Institute stations: Station 9 at Gordon's Bay, Station 10 at Simon's Town, Station 16 at Strandfontein, and Station 45 at Strandfontein (Matzikama).

== Development and human impact ==
Although urban development of the coast is intense along some parts of False Bay, much of the shoreline remains relatively wild and unspoiled. The bulk of the development is residential; there is little heavy industry. There are a few exceptions, however: one of the largest dynamite factories in the world used to lie near the beach in a sparsely inhabited region towards the eastern end of the bay. The nitroglycerine plant at this installation blew up twice in the second half of the 20th century and sent massive shockwaves across the bay, breaking windows and rattling walls on the distant shores. False Bay is poor in natural harbours. Almost all protection for shipping and smaller vessels has been created by extending the small naturally protected bays by artificial means (e.g., at Kalkbaai, Simon's Town, and Gordon's Bay).

During the 2018 Cape Town water crisis, two reverse osmosis desalination plants were installed at Strandfontein and Monwabisi resort on the north coast of the bay. They were operating by August 2018, but there have been problems and shutdowns since then due to algal blooms, a natural phenomenon quite common in the area. The locations were at least partly chosen for proximity to the suburbs of the Cape Flats, which could have been severely affected if the supply of piped water had failed.

The population of Cape Town has more than doubled since the 1980s, and pollution has followed suit. Over-fishing has caused major reductions in stock and catches of commercially and recreationally targeted fish and invertebrates, and poaching is widespread. Several alien invasive species have spread into the bay.

The environmental impact of recreational diving in False Bay has not been studied. Still, it is estimated to be low, partly because temperate subtidal reef ecosystems are relatively resilient and partly because relatively few divers visit each site, as many sites are accessible by both shore and boat.

== Climate change ==
Winds that drive upwellings have increased, cooling the bay's water and possibly enriching nutrients. The ecosystem has shifted as a result, with typical west coast species like kelp and rock lobsters expanding their ranges and populations eastwards. Sea level rise and exposure to more frequent storm surge have increased the erosion of low-lying sandy shores and increased the risk to coastal developments.

The rising sea level is cutting back the coastline near Macassar beach during high swell events at a rate in the order of 2 m (6.6 ft) per year. The sea level is estimated to have been rising at about 1.9 mm per year since 1958.

== Research ==
Early oceanographic and biological research in the region tended to be top-down and sector-based. Still, this trend has shifted, since the last decade of the 20th century, toward systems-oriented research for integrated coastal management and ecosystem-based conservation. Recent research has examined the effects of climate change, population growth, and related issues such as overfishing and coastal development.

On 25 September, 1968, and again, 21 years later, on 11 and 12 September, 1989, symposia on the environmental assessment of False Bay were held under the auspices of the Royal Society of South Africa in Cape Town. The proceedings of both symposia were published as dedicated issues of the Transactions of the Royal Society of South Africa. Subsequently, in 1991, the Society published the proceedings of the 1989 symposium in book form. A review paper published in August 2019 lists 310 relevant papers published on False Bay.

== See also ==
- List of bays of South Africa
- Cape Peninsula – Rocky peninsula in the Western Cape, South Africa
- Cape Town – Legislative capital of South Africa
- Helderberg Marine Protected Area – Marine conservation area in the Western Cape in South Africa
- Table Mountain National Park Marine Protected Area – Marine conservation area around the Cape Peninsula in South Africa
- Whittle Rock – Granite reef in False Bay, South Africa
