= South Atlantic High =

Semipermanent anticyclone over the Atlantic Ocean

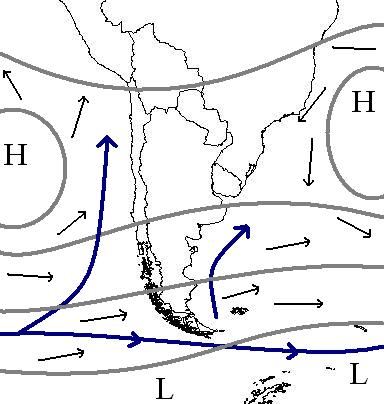
South Atlantic High on the right.

South Atlantic High is a semipermanent pressure high centered at about 25°S, 15°W, in the Atlantic Ocean. It is also called the St. Helena High, Saint Helena island being the only land in the area. It can stretch thousands of miles across the South Atlantic. This does not mean that the position and the intensity of this anticyclone are permanent, but just that there is an anticyclone on the maps describing the average monthly pressure. This area of high pressure is part of the great subtropical belt of anticyclones called the subtropical ridge.

== Formation ==
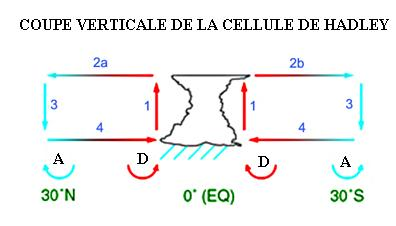
Hadley cell transporting heat and humidity from the Tropics toward the mid-latitudes.

In the Horse latitudes, generally in the region between 30 and 35 degrees of north and south latitude, there are more or less permanent highs. This is the subsiding part of Hadley cells. Indeed, near the equator, where the Coriolis force is quite weak, a direct circulation of air is established. In the lower levels of the atmosphere, the difference in temperature between the equator and the northerly warmer regions gives rise to the Intertropical Convergence Zone where the warmer air rises because of convergence and relatively lower density. Subsequently, this air spreads north and south and cools at higher altitude and descends further north and south.

== Associated weather ==
This system greatly affects sailing because the associated winds are generally not strong and sailing vessels have to go far north or south of the centre of the high pressure region depending on the direction of travel to find winds that are favourable in strength and direction.

== Climatic influence on economy ==
The anticyclonic circulation produces a dry climate, contributing to the aridity of the Namib and Kalahari deserts, but its influence does not stop there: the South Atlantic High brings warm weather from the east coast of South America to Africa in summer as it carries tropical air to its southern flank. On its northern flank, where the winds are easterly trade winds, there is the intertropical convergence zone that controls the African monsoon and the rainy season in the Guianas.
