= Cape Town water crisis =

2017–2018 water shortage in South Africa

Graph of total water stored in the Western Cape's largest six dams (blue) as well as City of Cape Town water restriction level (orange) from November 2013 to August 2021.

The Cape Town water crisis in South Africa was a multi-year period in 2015–2020 of water shortage in the Western Cape region, most notably affecting the City of Cape Town. Dam water levels began decreasing in 2015 and the Cape Town water crisis peaked during mid-2017 to mid-2018 when water levels hovered between 14 and 29 percent of total dam capacity.

In late 2017, there were first mentions of plans for "Day Zero", a shorthand reference for the day when the water level of the major dams supplying the City could fall below 13.5 percent. "Day Zero" became a term to mark the start of Level 7 water restrictions, when municipal water supplies would be largely switched off and it was envisioned that residents could have to queue for their daily ration of water. If this had occurred, it would have made the City of Cape Town the first major city in the world to run out of water in the municipal supply. The Cape Town water crisis occurred at the same time as the Eastern Cape drought, located in a separate region nearby.

The City of Cape Town implemented significant water restrictions in a bid to curb water usage, which reduced its daily water usage by more than half to around 500 million litres (130,000,000 US gal) per day in March 2018. The fall in water usage led the City to postpone its estimate for "Day Zero", and strong rains starting in June 2018 led to dam levels recovering. In September 2018, with dam levels close to 70 percent, the city began easing water restrictions, indicating that the worst of the water crisis was over. Good rains in 2020 effectively broke the drought and resulting water shortage when dam levels reached 95 percent.

== Background ==
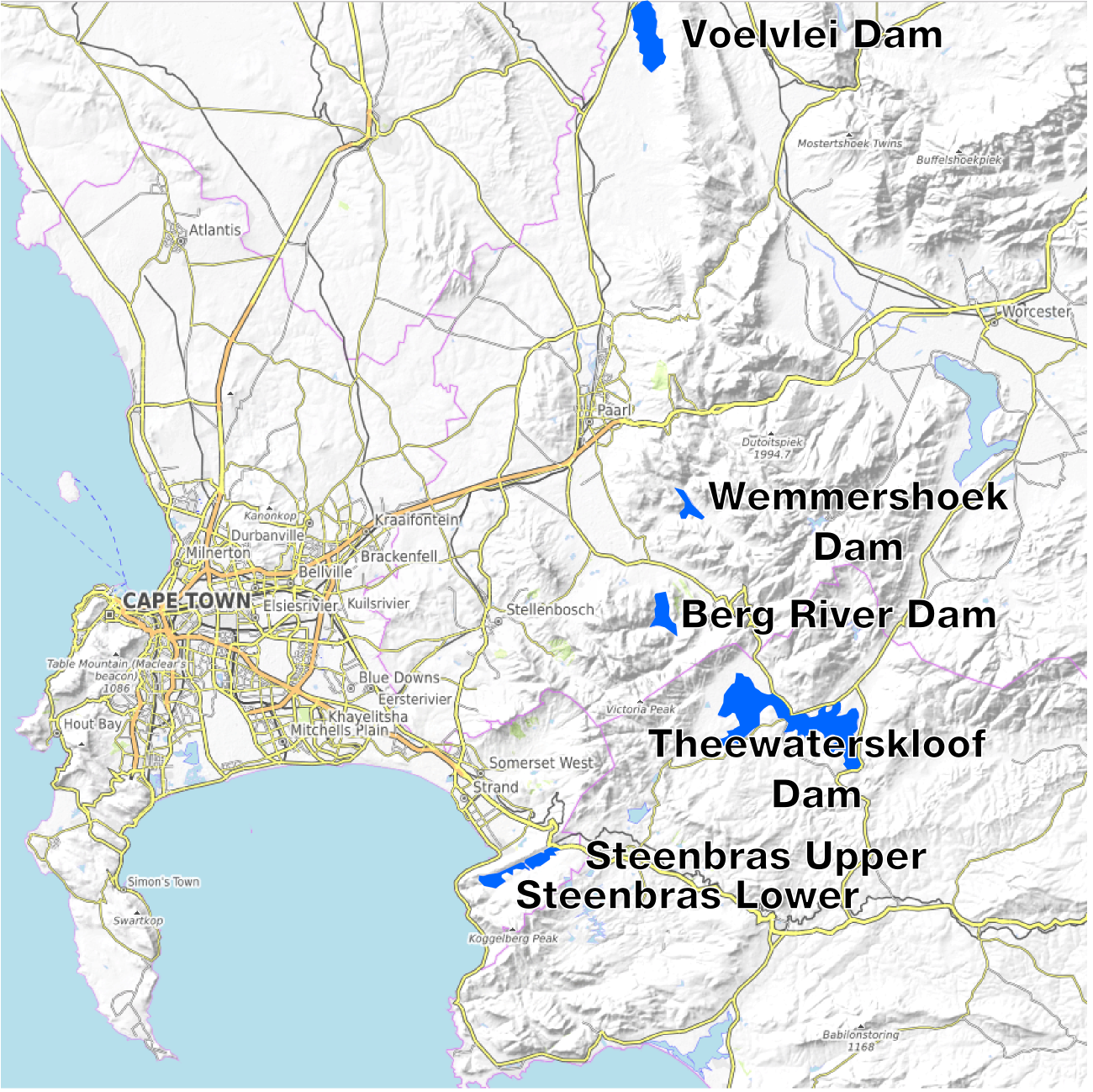
A map of the major dams that supply water to Cape Town

The Cape Town region experiences a Mediterranean climate with warm, dry summers and winter rainfall. The Western Cape Water Supply System relies almost entirely on rainfall, which is captured and stored in six major dams situated in mountainous areas. The dams are recharged by rain falling in the catchment areas, largely during the cooler winter months of May to August, and dam levels decline during the dry summer months of November to April during which urban water use increases and irrigation takes place in the agricultural areas.

Urban and agricultural use consume approximately 70 percent and 30 percent respectively of total water supplied by the Western Cape Water Supply System, with significant seasonal variations. In the post-Apartheid era, and under the Free Basic Water policy, the City of Cape Town adopted an increasing block tariff structure for water pricing, in which larger users of water were penalised with higher tariffs to discourage use, while tariff for the first block were set at (near) zero to ensure equitable access to a basic level of water for all South Africans. Registered low-income households in Cape Town with a direct water and sanitation connection receive their first 6 000 litres per month of water free, and are only charged a tariff for consumption above that amount. Households in informal settlements are supplied water from communal taps and use community toilets. For farmers who get water from the Western Cape Water Supply System, they are metered and monitored by irrigation boards and water user associations. Many farmers also join shared irrigation distribution schemes (from a specific river flow), and have on-site private storage dams and boreholes. The City claims that they make no profit on water sales, and that water pricing policy attempts to balance efficiency, equity and cost-recovery needs.

Periods of low winter rainfall in 2000–2001 and 2003–2004 resulted in water restrictions. In 2003, the City entered into an agreement with the then Department of Water Affairs and Forestry for the construction of the Berg River Dam and Supplement Scheme and also commenced water demand management. In 2009, the storage capacity of the dams supplying Cape Town was increased by 17 percent from 768 to 898 million cubic metres when the Berg River Dam and Supplement scheme were completed.

In 2015, the City of Cape Town won a prestigious international award recognising their efforts at Water Conservation and Demand Management (WCWDM). Cape Town was particularly successful at reducing water loss through leaks, with a water loss rate of 14 percent, compared to a national average of 35 percent. The by-laws also specify that water efficient fittings approved by the South African Bureau of Standards should be provided for all new developments and renovations.

== Timeline ==
Water levels as a percentage of total dam capacity by year.
Major dams	Capacity (megalitres)	17 May 2021	18 May 2020	13 May 2019	14 May 2018	15 May 2017	15 May 2016	15 May 2015	15 May 2014
Berg River Dam	130,010	76.1	65.6	68.1	39.2	32.4	27.2	54.0	90.5
Steenbras Lower	33,517	58.0	48.4	38.6	35.4	26.5	37.6	47.9	39.6
Steenbras Upper	31,767	54.2	96.5	65.0	59.6	56.7	56.9	57.8	79.1
Theewaterskloof Dam	480,188	75.2	50.2	36.1	12.0	15.0	31.3	51.3	74.5
Voelvlei Dam	164,095	58.3	50.4	55.4	14.5	17.2	21.3	42.5	59.5
Wemmershoek Dam	58,644	59.1	43.3	43.6	48.4	36.0	48.5	50.5	58.8
Total stored (megalitres)	898,221	626,907	481,370	411,849	191,843	190,300	279,954	450,429	646,137
Total % Storage	100	69.8	53.6	45.9	21.4	21.2	31.2	50.1	71.9

=== 2015–2016 ===
After good rains in 2013 and 2014, the City of Cape Town began experiencing a drought in 2015, the first of three consecutive years of dry winters brought on possibly by the El Niño weather pattern and perhaps by climate change. Water levels in the City's dams declined from 71.9 percent in 2014 to 50.1 percent in 2015. On 1 January 2016, previous water restrictions of Level 1 from 2005 had been lifted to Level 2 by the City and on 1 November 2016 it elevated these to Level 3, when the Department of Water and Sanitation gazetted water restrictions for urban and agricultural use. Significant droughts in other parts of South Africa ended in August 2016 when heavy rain and flooding occurred in the interior of the country, but the drought in the Western Cape remained.

=== 2017 ===
The City increased water restrictions to Level 3B on 1 February 2017 and by the end of the dry season in May 2017, the drought was declared the City's worst in a century, with storage in dams being less than 10 percent of their usable capacity. Level 4 water restrictions were imposed on 1 June 2017, limiting the usage of water to 100 litres per person per day. Overall rainfall in 2017 was the lowest since records commenced in 1933.

With the dry summer season approaching, the City increased its existing water restrictions to Level 4B on 1 July 2017, and to Level 5 on 3 September 2017, banning outdoor and non-essential use of water, encouraging the use of grey water for toilet flushing, and aiming to limit the overall per person water usage to 87 litres per day, for a total consumption of 500 million litres per day. However, the Level 5 restriction was accompanied by an ambiguous statement on household usage limits, which had the unintended consequence of increasing usage for some.

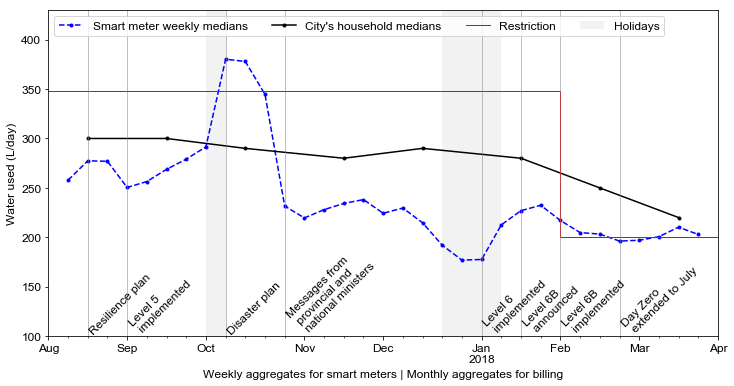
Behavioural response to messaging on the Day Zero drought

By early October 2017, following a low rainfall winter, Cape Town had an estimated five months of storage available before water levels would be depleted. In the same month, the City of Cape Town issued an emergency water plan to be rolled-out in multiple phases depending on the severity of the water shortage. Phase 1 comprising "water rationing through extreme pressure reduction" was implemented immediately. In Phase 2, post "Day Zero", water would have been shut off to most of the system except to places of key water access. Phase 3 would have been the point at which the City would no longer be able to draw water from surface dams in the Western Cape Water Supply System and there would have been a limited period of time before the water supply system fails.

=== 2018 ===
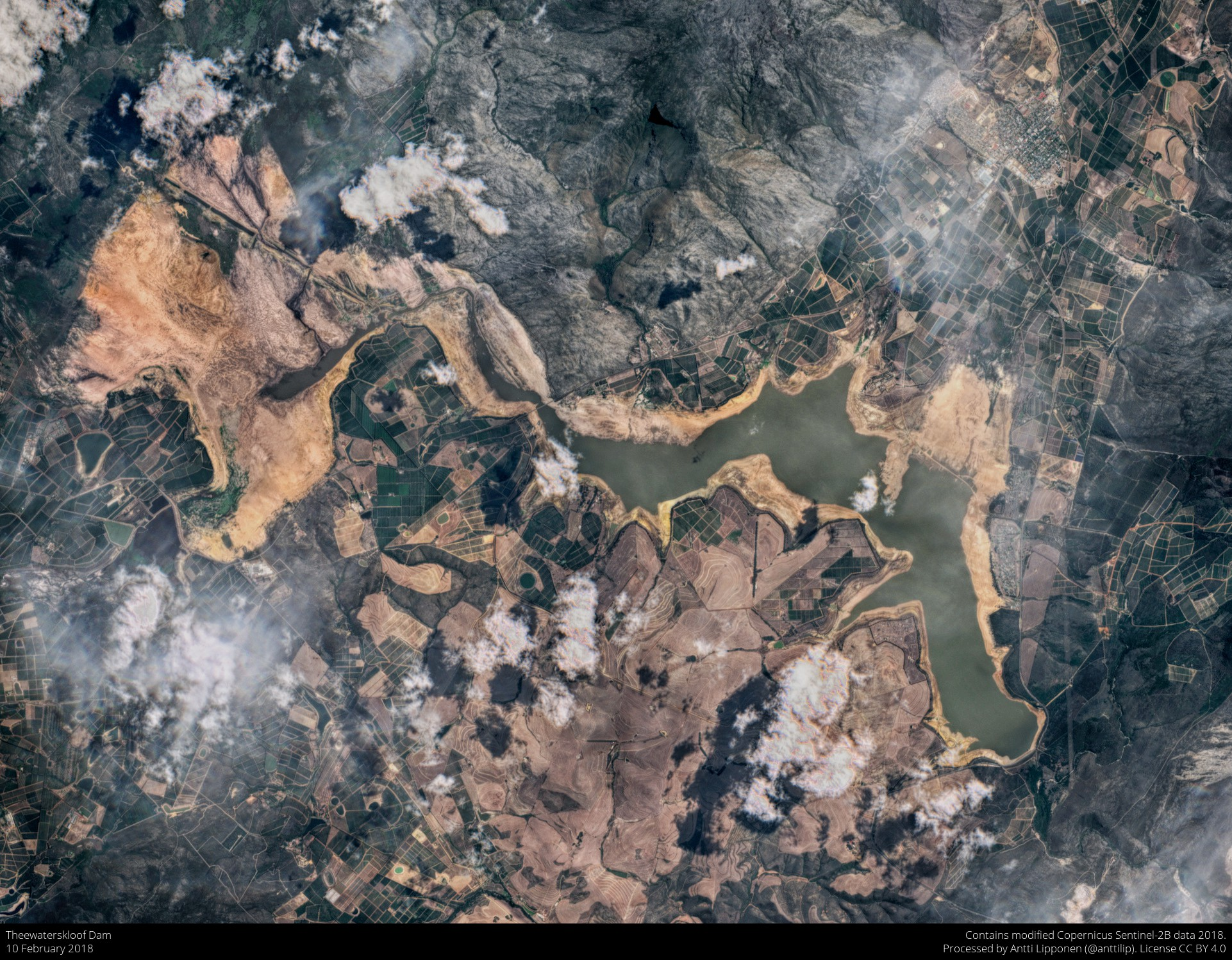
Theewaterskloof Dam at approximately 12% on 10 February 2018

On 1 January 2018 the City declared Level 6 water restrictions of 87 litres per person per day. In February 2018, the City increased restrictions to Level 6B limiting usage to 50 litres per person per day. The Provincial Cabinet also announced that it was drawing up plans with the South African Police Service for a strategy to deploy officers at water distribution points across the City after "Day Zero".

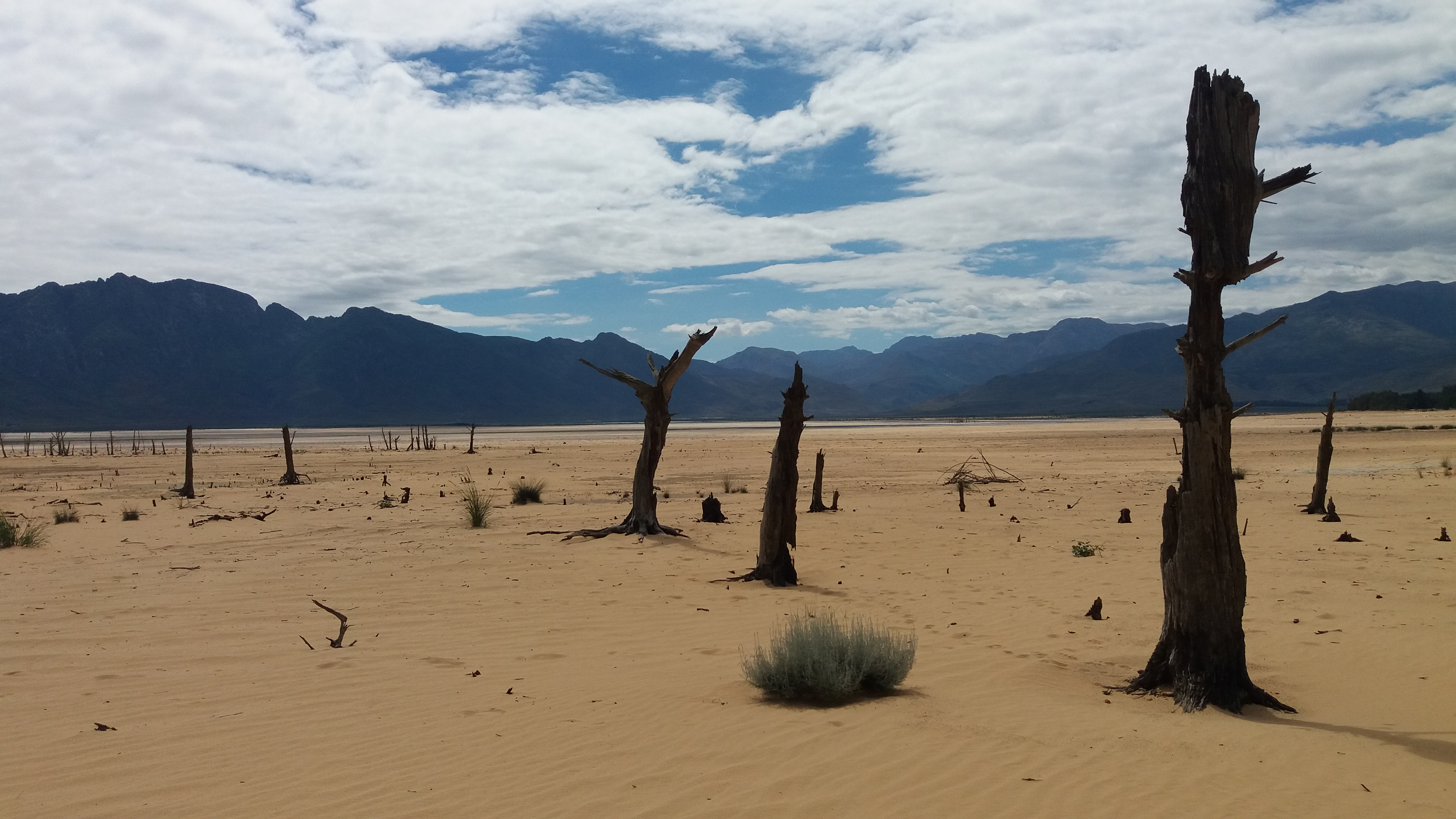
Cape Town's largest reservoir, Theewaterskloof, was at 11% capacity in March 2018

In mid-January 2018, previous Cape Town Mayor Patricia de Lille announced that the City would be forced to shut off most of the municipal water supply if conditions did not change. Level 7 water restrictions, "Day Zero", would be declared when the water level of the major dams supplying the City reached 13.5 percent. Municipal water supplies would largely be switched off, and residents would have to rely on 149 water collection points around the City to collect a daily ration of 25 litres of water per person. This would further affect Cape Town's economy, because employees would have to take time off from work to wait in line for water. Water supply would be maintained in the City's CBD, in informal settlements (where water is already collected from central locations) and to essential services such as hospitals. At the time of the announcement, "Day Zero" was projected to take place on 22 April 2018, but soon thereafter this was revised to 12 April. The "Day Zero" projections were based on the fortnightly changes in dam storage levels, assuming that the rates of decline would continue unchanged, with no further rainfall or change in water demand.

Residential and agricultural water usage declined significantly under the new restrictions. This enabled the City to move the estimated "Day Zero" back in stages, and on 28 June "Day Zero" was postponed indefinitely.

Good winter rains in 2018 resulted in dam levels rising, but the national Department of Water and Sanitation announced that bulk water restrictions would remain in place until levels reached 85 percent. In September, with dam levels close to 70 percent towards the end of the rainy season, the city reduced consumer water restrictions from level 6B to level 5. Dam levels peaked at 76 percent. In November, restrictions were reduced to Level 3, or 105 litres per person per day. Under Level 3 restrictions, municipal water may be used to water gardens at certain times, using a watering can or bucket but not a hose, to wash cars using a bucket, and to top up swimming pools as long as the pool is fitted with a cover to prevent evaporation.

== Causes ==
=== Severe drought ===
The immediate cause of the water crisis was the extreme drought from 2015 to 2017 that exceeded the planning norms of the Department of Water and Sanitation. Research on long-term weather data done by the Climate System Analysis Group at the University of Cape Town determined that the low rainfall between the years 2015 and 2017 was a very rare and extreme event. Decreasing rainfall trends are linked to broader changes in the atmospheric and oceanic circulation, including the poleward shift of the Southern Hemisphere moisture corridor between 2015–17, displacement of the jet-stream and an expansion of the semi-permanent South Atlantic High. 2017 was the driest year since 1933, and possibly earlier, since comparable data before 1933 was not available. It also found that a drought of this severity would statistically occur approximately once every 300 years.

=== Long-term demand and supply management ===
The City of Cape Town's population has grown from 2.4 million residents in 1995 to an estimated 4.1 million by 2015, representing a 71 percent population increase in 20 years, whereas dam water storage only increased by 17 percent in the same period. The impact of population increases on water demand is also often underestimated, as forecasting fails to take full account of the individual's indirect uses of water through food and consumer goods production. In 2007, the Department of Water Affairs and Forestry predicted that the growing demand on the Western Cape Water Supply System would exceed supply if water conservation and demand management measures were not implemented by the City and other municipalities.

This increase in long-run demand is exacerbated by strains on long-run supply of water, including invasive plant species and climate change. The spread of water-thirsty alien plants in crucial catchment areas have reduced water supply to the Theewaterskloof Dam by an estimated 30 million metric cube per annum. There has been a one degree Celsius increase in temperature over the past century and models predict that the average temperature in Cape Town will increase by another 0.25 degrees Celsius in the next ten years, which may increase the likelihood and severity of drought. The effects of climate change has also not been adequately captured in existing climate models: Helen Zille, Premier of the Western Cape, said that South African Weather Services was not expecting a severe drought for another 10 years.

=== Government failure ===
Responsibility for the water supply is shared by local, provincial and national government. The National Water Act (Act 36 of 1998) prescribes that the national government is the "public trustee" of the nation's water resources to ensure that water is "protected, used, developed, conserved, managed and controlled in a sustainable and equitable manner, for the benefit of all persons". This resulted in tension between the opposition-led local and provincial government (Democratic Alliance, DA) on the one hand, and the majority party-led national government on the other (African National Congress, ANC), with the parties blaming each other for the water crisis. The DA is criticized for a lack of forward thinking on the development of new water sources and infrastructures, while the ANC is accused of withholding funding to sabotage and embarrass the DA-led administration. According to a report by the South African Water Caucus, soaring debt and rampant corruption in the Department of Water and Sanitation may account for its failure to accept Western Cape's R35 million (US$3 million) request to increase water supplies and infrastructure in 2015. Helen Zille, Premier of the Western Cape, has called for the national government to refund the City of Cape Town for the costs of managing the water crisis.

In mid-October 2017, the City was criticised by some of the water desalination companies for the slow pace of procurement, high level of bureaucracy, lack of urgency, and the inadequate scale of the proposed water supply projects. In January 2018, in response to a damning report criticizing the City of Cape Town for failing to deal with the disaster in an adequate and timely manner and other governance failures, the DA federal executive decided to remove Cape Town mayor Patricia de Lille from managing the drought response task team, replacing her with Mmusi Maimane, leader of the DA, instead.

=== Rejection of desalination ===
In 2018, Cape Town rejected an offer from Israel to help it build desalination plants.

== Impact ==
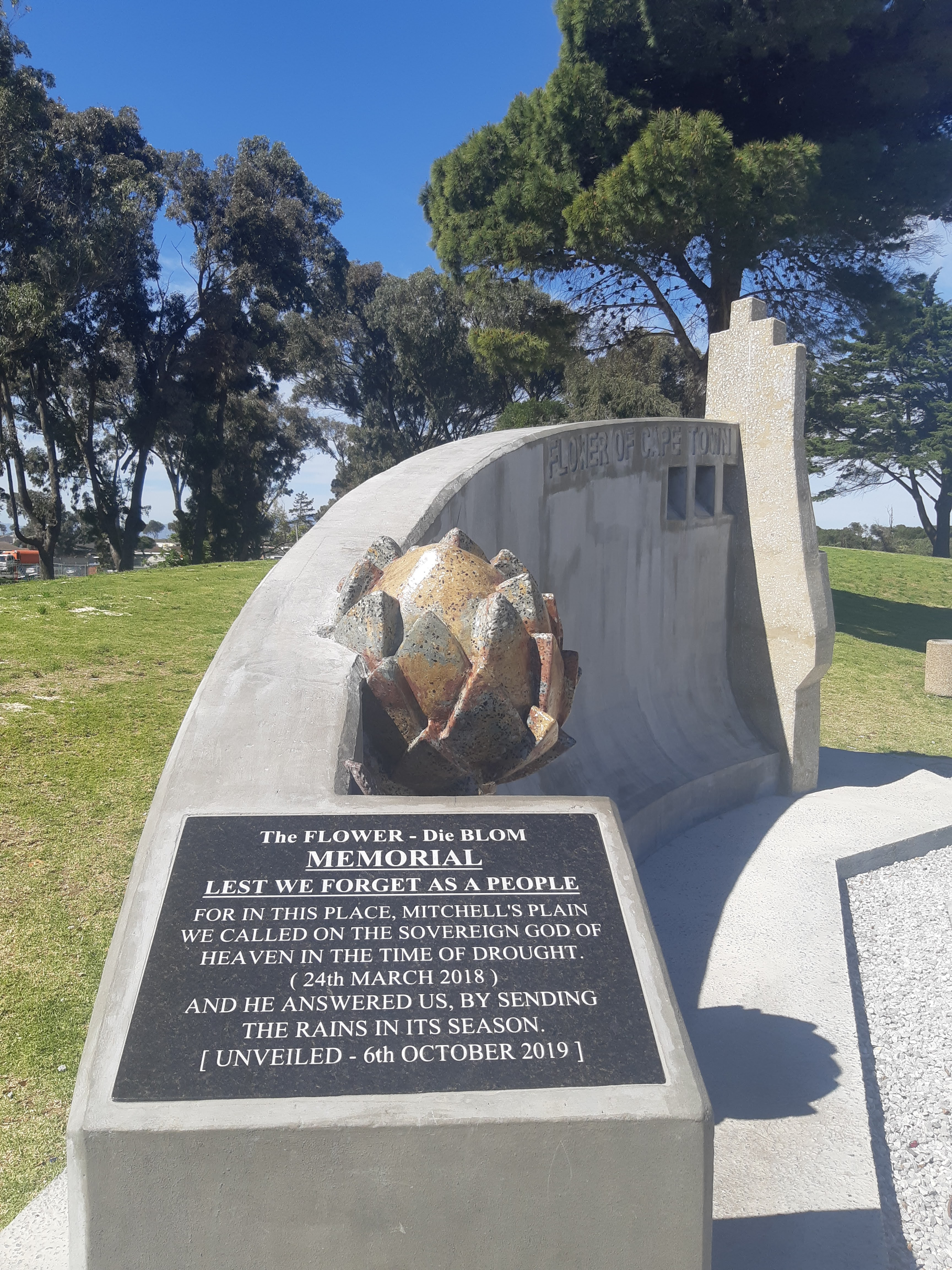
The Flower Monument in the Westridge Gardens was erected to memorialise a prayer meeting that called for good rains during the water crisis.

The water crisis had extensive economic, health and safety impacts. It is clear that the provision of municipal water for irrigation and urban use have positive externalities in the form of food security, public health, and overall stability.

=== Economic ===
The water crisis resulted in the loss of 37,000 jobs in the Western Cape Province and an estimated 50,000 people being pushed below the poverty line due to job losses, inflation and increases in the price of food. Analysts "estimate that the water crisis will cost some 300,000 jobs in agriculture and tens of thousands more in the service, hospitality and food sectors".

==== Agriculture ====
Agriculture is an important industry in the Western Cape. The wine industry in the Western Cape drew 1.5 million tourists in 2017, and together with the deciduous fruit industry employs about 340,000 workers and contributes more than 10% to the Western Cape economy. Many of the crops are also water intensive; for instance, a vineyard needs between 10 and 24 inches of water to survive. On average, the agriculture sector in the Western Cape had to cut its water use by 60 percent from 2017 to 2018, resulting in smaller yields and an estimated economic loss of R5.9 billion (US$400 million), 30 000 jobs and a 13–20 percent drop in exports. Some estimates put the figure higher at R14 billion (US$1 billion).

The returns on investment of the local wine and fruit industries are very low although the wine industry produces some of the most popular wines in the world. This led to concern that many agricultural businesses risk bankruptcy.

==== Tourism sector ====
Cape Town is a major tourist destination and is the city that receives the most long-haul visitors on the continent. The tourist industry was also hard hit with a decrease in arrivals, occupancy and visitor traffic at attractions in January 2018 when compared to the same period to in 2017. The accommodation sector reported a decline in occupancy of 10%. Hotels made service compromises, such as removing bath plugs, issuing hand sanitiser to guests, putting suppressors on showers and either draining pools completely or filling them with saltwater. In October 2017, the City launched one of its key initiatives, the 'Save like a local' campaign, with a focus on involving tourists in the city-wide drought interventions.

=== Hydrological poverty ===
Hydrological poverty tends to trap people that cannot afford to purchase the food or water necessary for their society to become more affluent. In Cape Town it is illegal to sell water from wells or rivers but people could still profit from the transport and labour associated with the delivery of water from other areas. Those who were using significantly more than the allocated daily water allowance of 50 litres per capita per day were fined between R500–3,000 (US$35–210). Yet this impact further cemented the poverty gap because the fine was relatively small for the wealthy but crippling for less affluent residents.

=== Public health ===
Public health professionals raised concerns about diseases that could be spread via faecal-oral contamination as a result of less hand-washing. Public health companies, research centres and health providers were also worried about the impact that the water crisis could have had on health services.

Inadequate sanitation could have led to diarrhoeal diseases, which kill 2.2 million people every year worldwide, with most deaths occurring among children younger than 5 years of age. With a population of around 4.3 million and a population density of around 1500 per square kilometre it was suggested that this could have led to diseases like cholera and other spreading rapidly without proper sanitation, especially in the impoverished neighbourhoods of Cape Town. Without clean water the public health consequences could have been increased by insects in dirty waters, which might have caused the further spread of diseases. Officials warned that water-borne illnesses such as cholera, hepatitis A and typhoid fever would "likely become more prevalent" as residents began storing water in contaminated containers. Especially the spreading of disease was very likely to occur as a result of the maximum use of 25 litres (6.6 gallons) of water per person per day, an insufficient amount to keep a household hygienic. This combined with the use of greywater and popular media encouragement to forego washing fruit had increased the risk of cross contamination. Another impact on public health as a result of the water crisis is the shortage of nutrients or the low quality of nutrients individuals receive. Because of water shortages yields of crops and livestock are reduced or lowered in quality.

=== Occupational health risks ===
Emergency shower and eyewash stations are an essential part of workplace safety for many laboratories and factories. A steady supply of water is necessary in the event of harmful chemical exposure. Many Occupational Health and Safety requirements suggested that emergency showers should be able to pump 75 litres per minute for a minimum of 15 minutes. If these wash stations had been banned or limited, workers who handle highly corrosive chemicals would have been vulnerable.

=== Childcare ===
In homes and orphanages, children were one of the most vulnerable groups that could have suffered from health effects of water scarcity. The feeding, washing, and sterilization of items required to care for children is water intensive. Furthermore, if schools in the Western Cape had their taps turned off on "Day Zero", 1.1 million children would be left without water.

=== Fire risks ===
There was concern that fire risk would increase as the environment and infrastructure became increasingly dry. This was especially significant for large industrial sites and warehousing as fire on one site could spread more easily to other buildings in close proximity. Fire suppression system might also have failed due to reduced water pressure in higher lying areas.

== Responses to the water crisis ==
There were attempts to both increase the supply and reduce the demand for water in the Western Cape Water Supply System. Many individuals and businesses attempted to reduce their reliance on the municipal water system to safeguard their own water supplies. The water crisis spurred research and investment in alternative water systems, which may ultimately help prevent other cities from falling into the same degree of water scarcity. It also highlighted the need for longer-term planning in a city where climate change will exacerbate the technical, legal and institutional challenges of delivering water across high levels of inequality. The combination of climate change and population increase in urban areas means other cities may face similar severe droughts and may need to consider alternative methods of obtaining water.

=== Supply augmentation ===
The City of Cape Town expended significant effort in raising the supply of water. Key efforts included:

- the buying of an additional two million and five million litres of water per day from the Molteno Reservoir in Oranjezicht and the Atlantis Aquifer respectively
- the commissioning of three small temporary (2-year contracts) desalination plants (two of 7 megalitres per day and one of 2 megalitres per day capacities) at the Monwabisi, Strandfontein, the V&A Waterfront, and Cape Town Harbour
- the Zandvliet water recycling project

Collectively, these projects were planned to produce an additional 144 million litres per day between February and July 2018. However, many of these projects were plagued by logistical challenges, and were running behind schedule. DA leader, Maimane, stressed that desalination plants were expensive and complex; specifically, one plant would cost R15 billion (US$1 billion), which is a third of the City's entire budget and the procurement process for such facilities are outside of the City's legal mandate. Plans for desalination plants were eventually abandoned as the cost per unit of water was too high.

In February 2018, at the height of the drought, the Groenland Water User Association (a representative body for farmers in the Elgin Grabouw agricultural area near Cape Town) began releasing an additional 10 million litres of water from their Eikenhof Dam at no cost. This water was transferred into the Upper Steenbras Dam. This enabled the City to push back estimates for Day Zero from 16 April to 11 May.

=== Urban water demand management ===
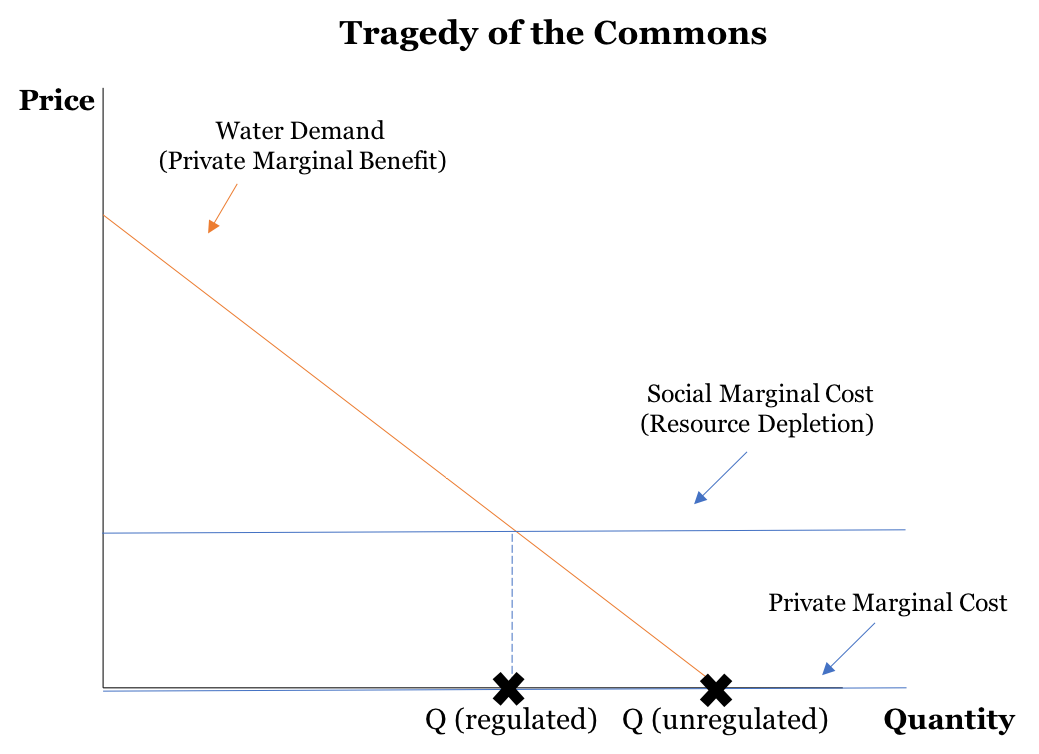
Common pool resources, like surface water, tend to be over-used and depleted, when unregulated

Surface water and rainfall exhibits properties of a common pool resource, which is subject to the tragedy of the commons. In the absence of regulation, self-interested individuals will make consumption decisions that deplete the commons, leading ecologist Garrett Hardin to declare that "freedom in a commons brings ruin to all". This is particularly acute during a water crisis when total supply may fall short of even the socially optimal level of consumption. As such, the City attempted to regulate use of the commons through exhortations for responsible use, direct allotment and use of water tariffs (for consumers to internalize the social marginal cost of their decision making).

The City of Cape Town successfully reduced water use by more than 50 percent during the drought from 2015 to 2018. Residential water usage declined significantly under the Level 6B restrictions, with the lowest recorded figure being 481 million litres per day on 2 July 2018, the closest to the targeted level of 450 million litres per day. The Water Outlook 2018 Report documents the changes in water demand from November 2013 to May 2018.

==== Enforced reductions ====
The limit for personal water use was constantly revised downwards throughout the crisis, with the lowest bound being 50 litres per day per person effective 1 February 2018. This level of use is just a third of the average daily water consumption of 150 litres in the United Kingdom and a sixth of average daily use in the United States. Urban residents were requested not to flush the toilet after urinating, to flush using rainwater or grey water after defecating, and to reduce the length and frequency of showers. In order to conserve water, hand sanitizer was provided in offices and public buildings for use instead of conventional hand-washing. Some cafes began using plastic and paper cups and plates to reduce dishwashing. Using municipal water to top up pools, irrigate lawns or hose down surfaces was forbidden. It is estimated that around 50 percent of households adhered to water restrictions.

The City explored various measures to ensure compliance:

- Creation of an online map with green dots showing which houses were doing a good job saving water
- City officials drove through neighborhoods that were using too much water with a bullhorn calling them out
- Publishing of the names of top water users
- Failure to comply with demand restrictions could result in the installation of a water-management device, that strictly limits consumption to 350 litres per day, with the home owner having to foot the R4,500 (US$314) installation bill. In Dec 2017, Mayor Patricia de Lille personally visited the homes of water wasters to install water management meters.
- The law enforcement department stepped up its policing of water waste

==== Hike in water tariffs ====
The City also raised water tariffs, especially for residents who continued to use large amounts of water, often for luxurious, non-essential uses. At the highest tariff rates, using more than 35,000 litres of water a month cost R768.64 (US$54) per 1,000 litres, which the City describes as punitive. According to the Water Outlook 2018 Report, the average water demand dropped by about 45 percent from February 2017 to February 2018. This translated "to a shortfall in revenue of nearly R2 billion (US$140 million) in the current year", which was also a motivating factor behind tariff hikes.

Research also supported the use of pricing policy as a tool for efficient water allocation. In comparing flat rate pricing (for which the marginal cost of consumption equals to zero) to volumetric pricing of domestic water utilities, Hanke and Bolard (1971) showed that a shift from the former to the latter was effective at achieving a lasting decline in domestic water usage. Water tariffs are particularly effective at reducing water demand for non-essential uses as such demand is often price-elastic, and will fall more than proportionately in response to a price hike.

=== Alternative water supply ===
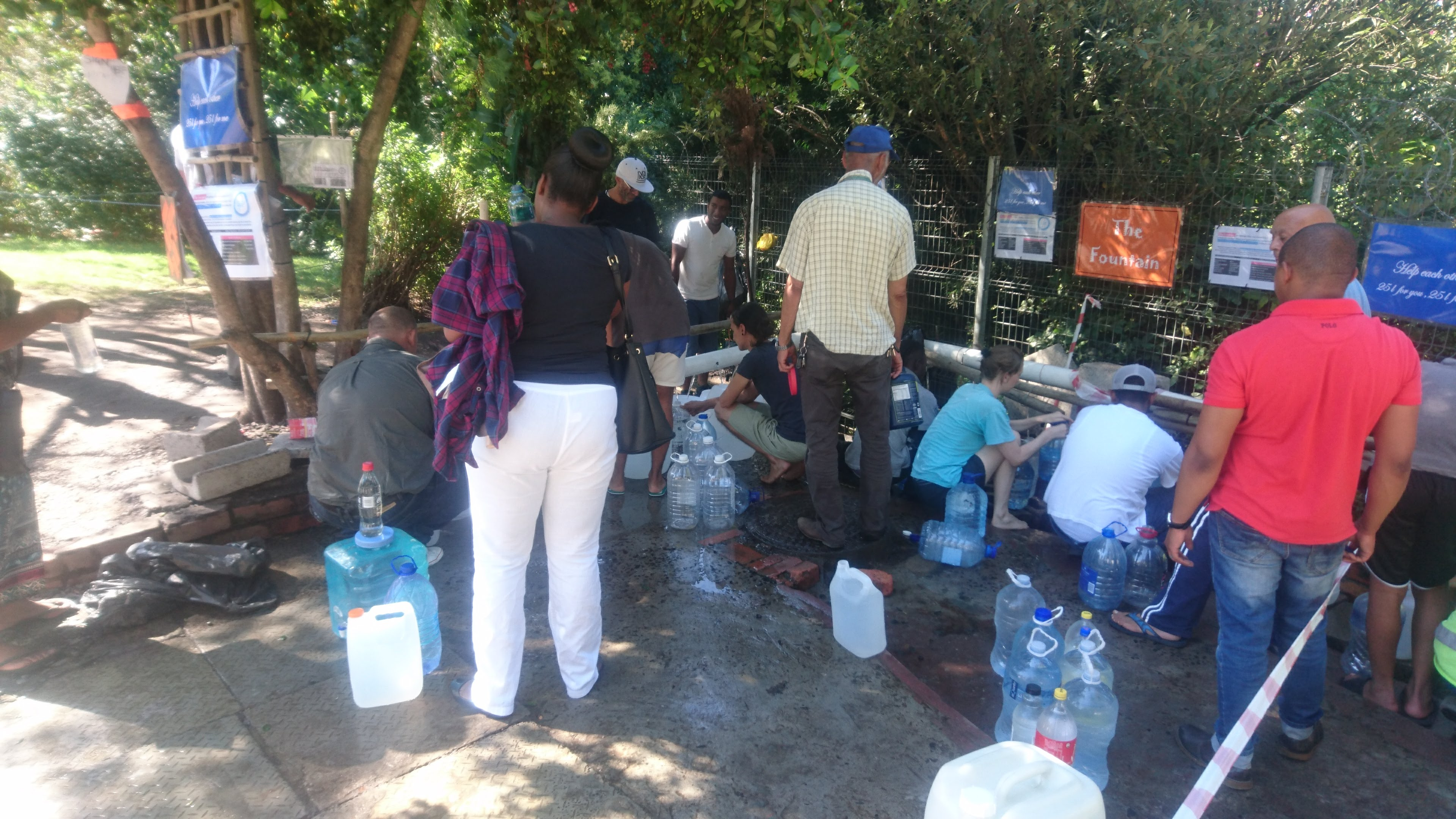
Residents queueing up at the Newlands Spring

Doomsday predictions of Day Zero in Cape Town led many individuals and businesses to seek alternative water supplies from the Western Cape Water Supply System. Many locals, armed with plastic containers, collected water from mountain streams and natural springs around the city. This led to long lines and even fights between citizens, and the City stepped up security at popular locations.

More innovative solutions included the installation of water storage tanks that will collect rainwater, and the drilling of private boreholes. Since the marginal cost of using water from the water storage tanks or private boreholes is close to zero, households and businesses with such installed options can reduce their demand for municipal water and meet their most price inelastic needs with these alternative supplies of water, with more price elastic needs making up a larger percentage of total municipal water demand.

This has potentially deleterious long-run consequences for water security and the municipal water supply system: first, it hampers the ability of the city to use water pricing and tariff policy to regulate use of the commons and two, given the importance of cross-subsidization of low-volume users by high-volume users in a progressive tiered-water tariff system, it raises financial sustainability concerns for a water system that is already buckling under its fiscal weight. While water regulations do not easily allow citizen and local businesses to go off the municipality's water supply system, further changes in local by-laws may need to be implemented to enable well-off households and the private sector to contribute to augmenting water service delivery.

=== Water-efficient farming ===
This water crisis has spurred research into, and the adoption of, more water-efficient methods of farming. Farmers have increasingly adopted agricultural precision technology to gain better insight into water use on their farm. Researchers from the University of Cape Town are examining traits from wild plants that can grow with limited water, with hopes of replicating such traits in food crops through conventional breeding and biotechnology. Other scientists are studying metabolism of plants to learn how they use less water during photosynthesis, which enables them to survive during long periods of severe drought. It is noteworthy that despite having the largest area under irrigation (269 476 ha), the Western Cape also has the lowest, and most efficient water use per area unit (5 874 cubic metres per ha) among the country's provinces.

=== Water-saving campaign at schools ===
In the second half of 2017, a campaign was launched to help save water through a maintenance and behavioral change campaign at schools. The intention was to save water at the schools, but also to raise awareness with the children. These children could then take the message home, thereby reaching thousands of users. The campaign was launched as a collaborative effort between four main partners: Shoprite (Africa's biggest retailer), Stellenbosch University, Cape Talk radio, and Bridgiot. Through the support of 93 corporate entities 358 schools were reached. Each corporate adopted one or more schools, with Shoprite supporting 100 schools. The Western Cape Education Department also contributed supporting a number of schools.

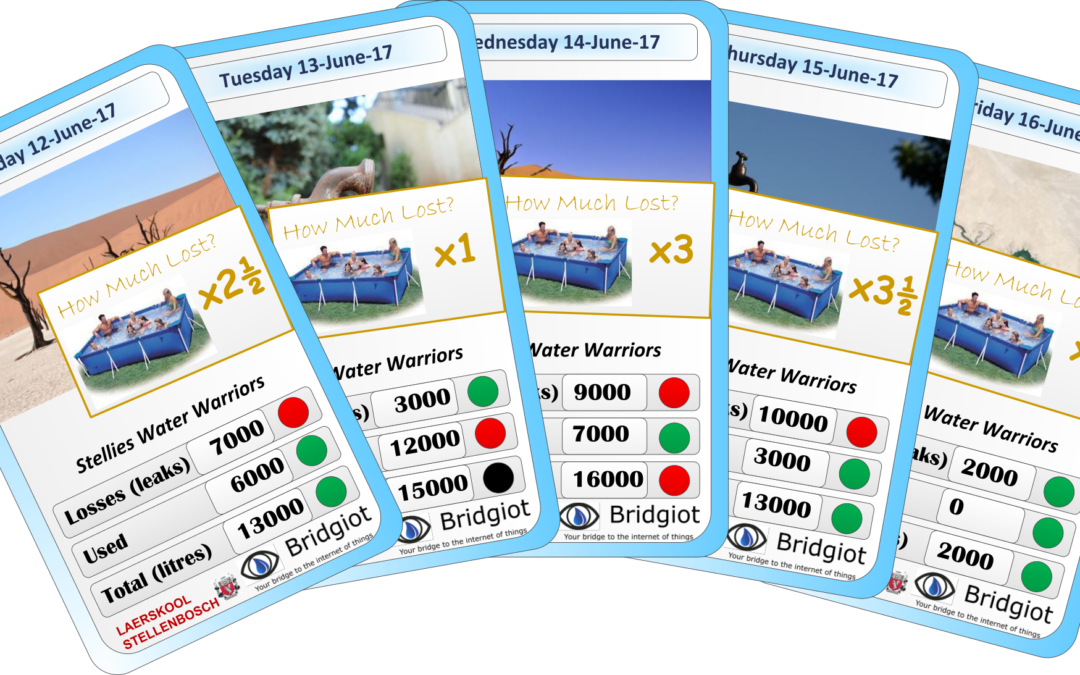
Top Trumps playing cards used to raise awareness at schools

The campaign's first phase was the installation of a smart meter, called the Dropula, followed by a 'quick-and-dirty' maintenance drive at each school. This was then followed by a behavioural change campaign, in which schools were split into three groups: a control group that was mostly left in the dark, except for subsequent urgent interventions, a group in which only staff were sent information, and a group in which the staff received information and the children were engaged in a competition. The results showed drastic savings from the maintenance drive with minimum night flow reducing by 28%. The behavioural change led to total additional savings ranging from 15% to 26%, with the information-only group saving the most. An interesting outcome from the study was the distribution of water use across school quintiles. The poorer schools have a water efficiency of around 50%, while affluent schools have a water efficiency of closer to 80%. The project was also covered in a CNN feature.

== Controversies ==
The water crisis has seen no lack of political controversies and misinformation, making it challenging to discern the true extent of the crisis, and to accurately appraise efforts at addressing the crisis. Some have even questioned the existence of a water crisis, and downplayed "Day Zero" as a scare tactic.

=== Distributional inequalities ===
The Cape Town water crisis have laid bare the water distributional inequalities in the city. Although one fifth of Cape Town's population lives in informal settlements, only 3.6 percent of the province's water supply went to such settlements in 2016/2017. This is so as residential demand for water is a function of infrastructure provided, and households relying on communal standpipes—as is the case in most townships—consume a lot less water than households with an in-house connection. This means that in practice, many of the residents of informal settlements already consume water at levels compliant with Level 6B restrictions and saw no substantial change in lifestyle before and during the water crisis. Observers have criticized the government's neglect of such water security and equity problems in the informal settlements prior to the Cape Town water crisis. Human Rights Watch released a statement, imploring the government to "keep respect for and fulfillment of fundamental rights at the core of a sustainable resolution, and ensure that allocation of water is prioritized according to vital needs."

=== Allocation between agricultural and urban use ===
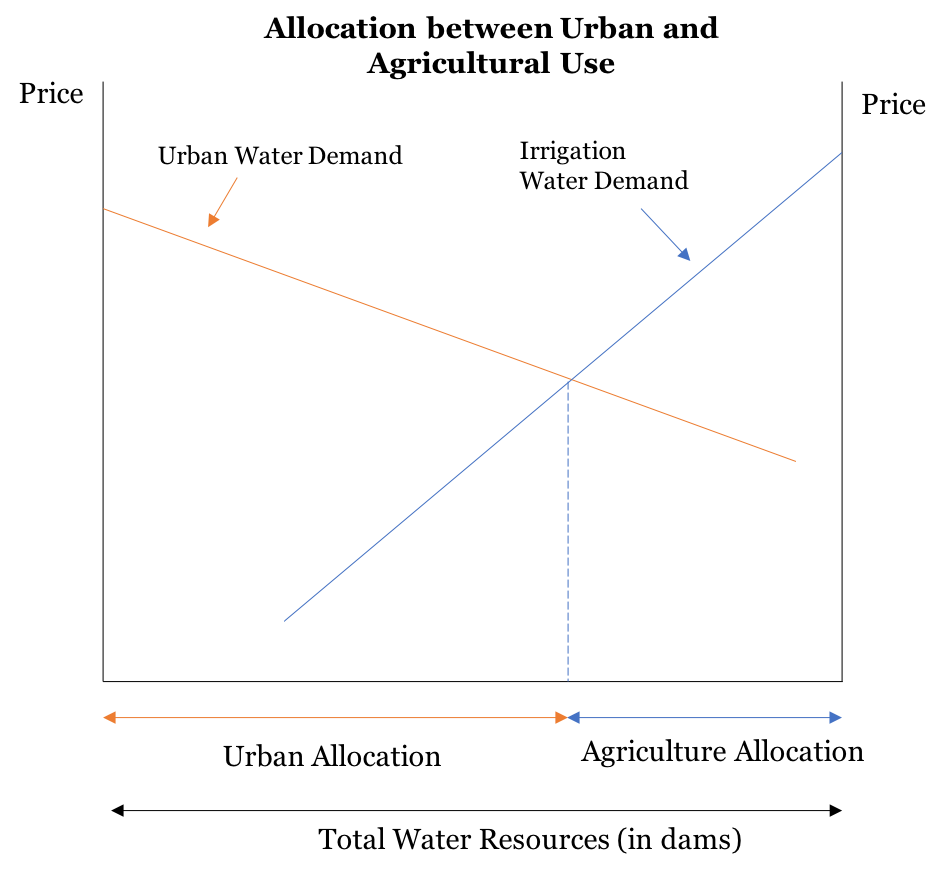
Allocation between different water uses depends on the relative marginal benefits of use. Graph does not model externalities.

Water restrictions were imposed on both agricultural and urban use of municipal water. On average, the agriculture sector in the Western Cape has had to cut its water use by 60 percent since 2017. Water restrictions varied from 50 percent in the Breede Valley, 60 percent in the Berg River and Riviersonderend region and 87 percent in the Lower Olifants River Valley. At Level 6B water restrictions, urban areas were expected to cut their water consumption by 45 percent. Anton Rabe, CEO of Hortgro, which represents deciduous fruit growers in Cape Town, argued that the cut of 60 percent to agriculture, compared with 45 percent to the city, was unfair. However, there were also sensational news and vlogs which blamed the water crisis on water inefficient agricultural and livestock farming methods. Optimal allocation of water between agricultural and urban use is particularly complicated due to the presence of multiple externalities, with irrigated water being crucial for food security and urban use for public health, as well as the seasonal changes in demand.

=== Comments by Premier of Western Cape, Helen Zille ===
Helen Zille, Premier of the Western Cape, drew attention for some of her comments on the water crisis. In September 2017, she revealed that she only showered once every three days, and that she regards "oily hair in a drought to be as much of a status symbol as a dusty car." This spurred public discussion, with some praising her dedication to the drought response and others offering cynicism. In January 2018, Zille also ignited outrage on Twitter after she responded to concerns over government neglect of water insecurity in the informal settlements by praising colonialism for providing piped water. This led to censure by the DA for "an infraction on the use of social media". Zille is also known for her doomsday characterization of the water crisis, at times comparing it to World War II and 9/11, which some have criticized as counter-productive.

=== Internal fights within the Democratic Alliance ===
In January 2018, the DA announced that Cape Town Mayor Patricia de Lille would be formally "charged and investigated" for eight charges of "governance failures" (unrelated to the water crisis) and would be removed from her leadership role in the city's response to the water crisis with immediate effect. Cape Town City Manager Achmat Ebrahim, who was implicated in alleged wrongdoing alongside De Lille, also resigned from his position.

=== Desalination and Israel ===
Members of the ANC have accused the DA of fabricating and exaggerating the water crisis to benefit Jews and Israel. This is so as Israel is a global leader in water desalination technology, and would be a potential partner in helping Cape Town set up her desalination plants. Relations between post-Apartheid South Africa and Israel have historically been rocky, with South Africa accusing Israel of apartheid (in handling the Israel–Palestine conflict). This has hampered effective collaboration in water management. For instance, a 2016 Johannesburg conference focusing on the water crisis was canceled due to news that the Israeli ambassador to South Africa at the time would be attending.

== See also ==
- Water scarcity
- Water security
- Common-pool resource
- Tragedy of the commons
- Millennium drought
- 2019 Chennai water crisis – similar water crisis that occurred in Chennai, India
- 2022–2023 Uruguay drought – similar water crisis that occurred in Montevideo, Uruguay
- 2018–20 Southern Africa drought
- Water demand management
