= Jackson Muneza M'vunganyi =

Rwandan-American journalist and broadcaster

- Born: Western Uganda
- Education: American University; University of Maryland
- Occupations: Journalist, broadcaster, multimedia producer
- Employer: Voice of America
- Known for: Hosting UpFront and Red Carpet

Jackson Muneza M'vunganyi is a Rwandan-American multimedia journalist, broadcaster, and digital media producer based in Washington, D.C. He is known for hosting UpFront, a youth-focused talk show produced by the Voice of America (VOA), and Red Carpet, VOA's entertainment program.

== Early life and education ==
M'vunganyi was born in a refugee camp in western Uganda after his family fled Rwanda. He has described growing up with limited resources and listening to VOA radio with his father as a primary source of information.

He returned to Rwanda at the age of 18 following the Rwandan genocide to attend university. He later moved to the United States for higher education, earning a bachelor's degree in Multimedia Development from American University in Washington, D.C., and a master's degree in Information Management from the University of Maryland.

== Career ==
M'vunganyi developed an interest in broadcasting and radio from a young age. He joined the Voice of America after completing graduate school.

In 2007, VOA's English to Africa Service launched UpFront as a youth-oriented talk show, with M'vunganyi serving as one of its hosts from Washington, D.C. The program was designed to engage young audiences across Africa and became a cross-continental radio program reaching students and young professionals.

As a host of UpFront, M'vunganyi covers issues including education, entrepreneurship, culture, leadership, innovation, and technology. According to his professional biographies, the program reaches more than 35 million listeners weekly across Africa and beyond. The UpFront Africa Facebook page has also attracted a large following, making it one of VOA's prominent digital platforms targeting African audiences.

M'vunganyi also hosts Red Carpet, VOA's entertainment program, which covers African and international entertainment, music, film, and popular culture.

His field reporting has taken him to more than 10 African countries, covering subjects including technology in Morocco, female genital mutilation in Kenya, the 2014–2016 Ebola virus epidemic in Liberia and Sierra Leone, and the Cape Town water crisis.

== Recognition and other work ==
M'vunganyi has received recognition for his contributions to journalism, broadcasting, and digital media.

In 2016, he was named one of the "20 Young African Influencers in the Diaspora". In 2020, he was featured on the cover of Ayoo Magazine as a trailblazer in new media.

He has also participated as a speaker and moderator at institutions and organizations including the United Nations, World Bank, International Republican Institute, Harvard University, Wharton School, and Georgetown University.

M'vunganyi has developed a significant social media following through his coverage of African news and current affairs. His social media updates have attracted thousands of followers, reportedly including former U.S. president Barack Obama.
