= Water supply and sanitation in South Africa =

Data
- Water coverage (broad definition): (improved water source) 93% (2015)
- Sanitation coverage (broad definition): (improved sanitation) 66% (2015)
- Continuity of supply: High
- Average urban water use (L/person/day): 186 (2006)
- Average urban water and sanitation tariff (US$/m^{3}): 1.07 (2006)
- Share of household metering: High
- Annual investment in WSS: US$38 per capita (2007)
- Share of external financing: 30% self-financing, 51% tax-financing and 19% loan financing (2003–07)

Institutions
- Decentralization to municipalities: Substantial
- National water and sanitation company: None
- Water and sanitation regulator: None
- Responsibility for policy setting: Department of Water Affairs
- Sector law: 1997 Water Services Act
- No. of urban service providers: 169
- No. of rural service providers: Urban service providers also serve rural areas

Water supply and sanitation in South Africa is characterised by both achievements and challenges. After the end of Apartheid South Africa's newly elected government struggled with the then growing service and backlogs with respect to access to water supply and sanitation developed. The government thus made a strong commitment to high service standards and to high levels of investment subsidies to achieve those standards. Since then, the country has made some progress with regard to improving access to water supply: It reached universal access to an improved water source in urban areas, and in rural areas the share of those with access increased from 66% to 79% from 1990 to 2010.

South Africa also has a strong water industry with a track record in innovation. However, much less progress has been achieved on sanitation: Access increased only from 71% to 79% during the same period. Significant problems remain concerning the financial sustainability of service providers, leading to a lack of attention to maintenance. The uncertainty about the government's ability to sustain funding levels in the sector is also a concern. Two distinctive features of the South African water sector are the policy of free basic water and the existence of water boards, which are bulk water supply agencies that operate pipelines and sell water from reservoirs to municipalities.

In May 2014 it was announced that Durban's Water and Sanitation Department won the Stockholm Industry Water Award "for its transformative and inclusive approach", calling it "one of the most progressive utilities in the world". The city has connected 1.3 million additional people to piped water and provided 700,000 people with access to toilets in 14 years. It also was South Africa's first municipality to put free basic water for the poor into practice. Furthermore, it has promoted rainwater harvesting, mini hydropower and urine-diverting dry toilets.

On 13 February 2018, the country declared a national disaster in Cape Town as the city's water supply was predicted to run dry before the end of June. With its dams only 24.9% full, water saving measures were in effect that required each citizen to use less than 50 litres a day. All nine of the country's provinces were effected by what the government characterized as the "magnitude and severity" of a three-year drought. According to UN-endorsed projections, Cape Town is one of eleven major world cities that are expected to run out of water. In 2018, Cape Town rejected an offer from Israel to help it build desalination plants.

== Water resources and water use ==
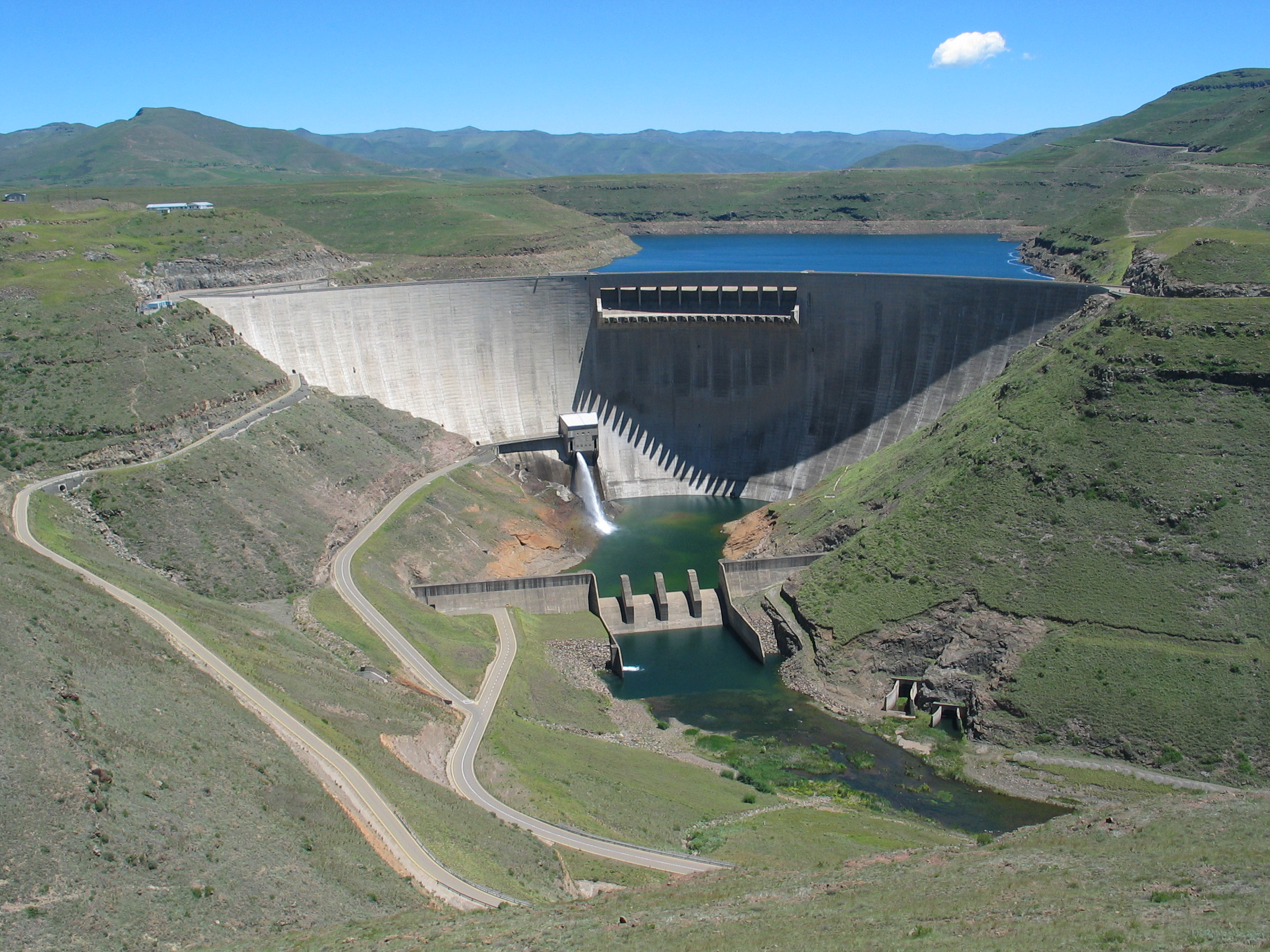
The Katse dam in Lesotho is an important source of water supply for the arid Gauteng area around Johannesburg, the industrial heartland of South Africa.

Water availability in South Africa varies greatly in space and time. While the West is dry with rainfall only during the summer and as low as 100 mm, the East and Southeast receive rainfall throughout the year with an average of up to 1,000 mm. Total annual surface runoff is estimated at 43 to 48 km^{3}, depending on the source.

Much of the runoff is lost through flood spillage, so that the available surface water resources are estimated at 14 km^{3}/year only. Although groundwater is limited due to geologic conditions, it is extensively utilised in the rural and more arid areas. Available groundwater is estimated at 1 km^{3}/year. The main rivers of South Africa are fairly small compared to the large rivers of the world: For example, the discharge of the Nile River alone is about six times higher than the available surface water resources from all South African rivers together.

The main rivers are the Orange River draining to the Atlantic Ocean, the Limpopo River, the Incomati River, the Maputo River, the Tugela River, the Olifants River (Limpopo), and the Breede River. The uMkhomazi, Maputo, Thukela and Limpopo all drain to the Indian Ocean. South Africa's most important rivers are transboundary: The Orange River is shared with Botswana, Namibia and Lesotho, the "water tower" of Southern Africa. The Limpopo-Olifants river basin is shared with Botswana, Zimbabwe and Mozambique, which lies the furthest downstream. International commissions of all riparian countries have been set up to manage these transboundary water resources. Potential future water resources are seawater desalination or the transfer of water from the Zambezi River.

Total annual water withdrawal was estimated at 12.5 km^{3} in 2000, of which about 17% was for municipal water use. In the northern parts of the country, both surface water and groundwater resources are nearly fully developed and utilised. In the well-watered southeastern regions of the country significant undeveloped and used resources exist. The Gauteng area around Johannesburg, which is very water scarce, receives water from various dams in the area such as the Vaal Dam and imports water from the Orange River system through the Lesotho Highlands Water Project, in particular from the Katse Dam. Cape Town receives its drinking water from an extensive system of rivers and dams, including the Berg River Dam.

Cape Town has 26 treatment plants, some of which are ineffective and date back to the 1950s, making clean water access and wastewater management major difficulties.

Cape Town will receive an €80 million loan from KfW to assist the city in improving and expanding different municipal wastewater treatment plants, a €1.2 million grant for training and a €4.5 million grant for city-supporting measures. The upgrades will allow the city to use recycled water for agricultural or industrial purposes and assist in dealing with droughts.

=== Wastewater reuse ===
In South Africa, the main driver for wastewater reuse is drought conditions. For example, in Beaufort West, South Africa's a direct wastewater reclamation plant (WRP) for the production of drinking water was constructed in the end of 2010, as a result of acute water scarcity (production of 2,300 m^{3} per day). The process configuration based on multi-barrier concept and includes the following treatment processes: sand filtration, UF, two-stage RO, and permeate disinfected by ultraviolet light (UV).

The town George faced water shortages and had decided on an IPR strategy (2009/2010), where final effluents from its Outeniqua WWTP are treated to a very high quality through UF and disinfection prior to being returned to the main storage facility, the Garden Route Dam, where they are combined with current raw water supplies. This initiative augments the existing supply by 10,000 m^{3} per day, approximately one third of the drinking water demand. The process configuration includes the following treatment processes: drum screen, UF, and chlorine disinfection. Provision has been made for powdered activated carbon (PAC) addition at George WTW, if required as an additional operational barrier.

Another example of DPR is the reuse plant constructed and operated in the town Hermanus (Overberg) in South Africa, where now 2,500 m^{3} per day of effluent reused, with a future plan to increase the capacity to 5,000 m^{3} per day. The treatment processes applied include UF pre-treatment, RO desalination, as well as advanced oxidation and carbon filtration. The product from the reuse plant is fed directly into the drinking water reticulation system.

== Access to water by SA citizens ==
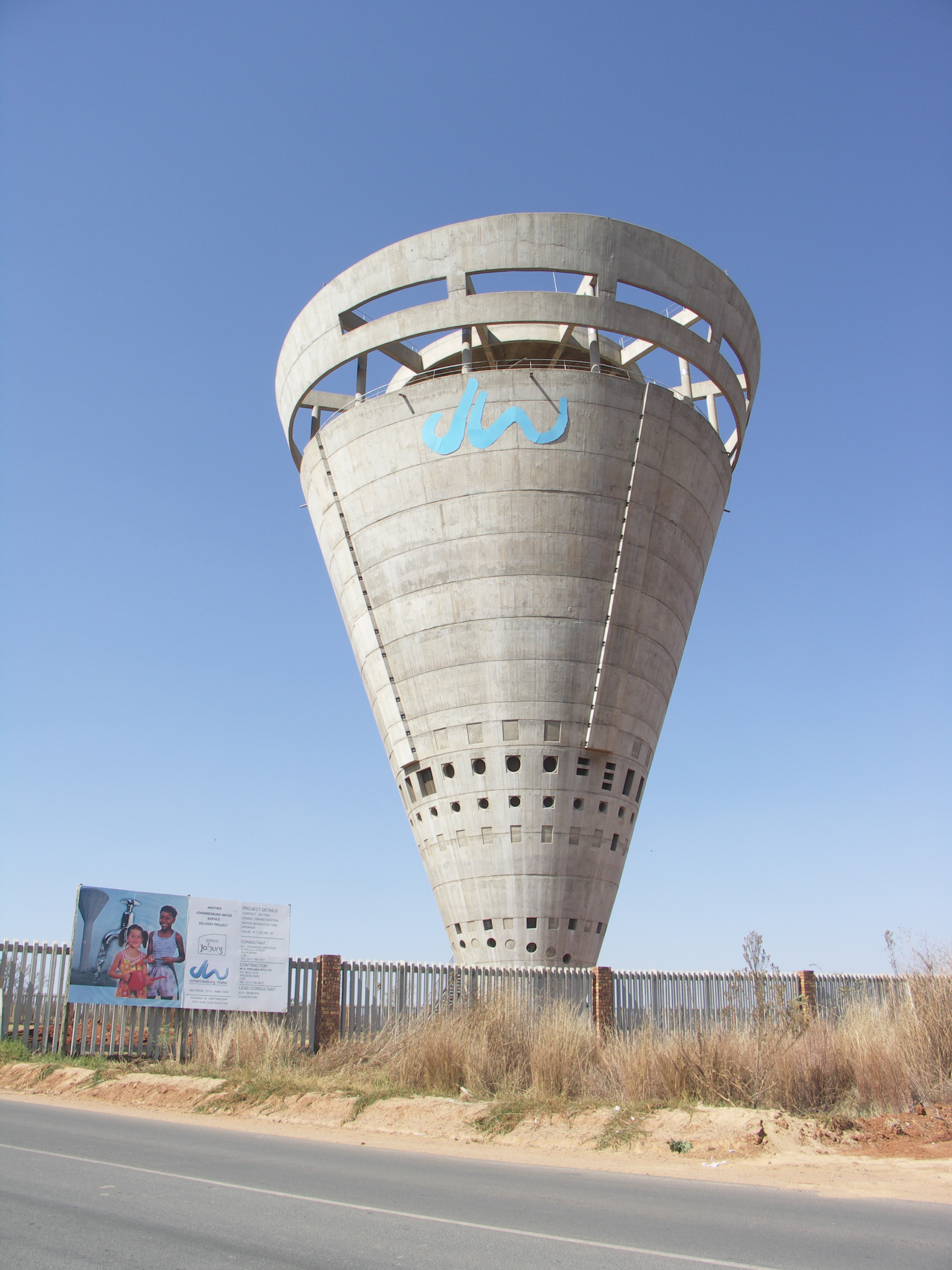
A water tower in Midrand, Johannesburg

South Africa is one of the few countries in the world that enshrines the basic right to sufficient water in its Constitution, stating that "Everyone has the right to have access to [...] sufficient food and water." However, much remains to be done to fulfill that right.

After the end of Apartheid South Africa's newly elected government inherited highly functional services with respect to access to water supply and sanitation.

However, as of 2017, owing to a lack of maintenance resulting from corruption, provision of water and sanitation has largely collapsed. In 2015, the Department of Water and Sanitation said it would require R293-billion to fix and upgrade all water and sewage infrastructure in the country.

While there has been a growth in the overall number of water-supplied dwellings, the percentage of houses with running water has decreased since 1994.

=== Water ===
In 2015, the total number of people in South Africa lacking access to an "improved" water supply was 3.64 million. 93% of the population had access to an improved water source in that year.

In his State of the Union address in May 2004 President Thabo Mbeki had promised "all households will have running water within five years". Despite substantial progress, this goal was not fully achieved. In some rural areas, women spend up to one-third of their time fetching water from streams and wells. They are also responsible for using it to cook meals, wash laundry and bathe children.

=== Sanitation ===
With respect to sanitation, progress has been slower. The total number of people in South Africa lacking access to "improved" sanitation was 18 million in 2015. This means that only 66% of the total population had access to improved sanitation in that year.

According to estimates by the WHO/UNICEF global Joint Monitoring Programme for Water Supply and Sanitation based on survey and census data, the share of South Africans with access to improved sanitation increased slowly from 71% in 1990 to 75% in 2000 and 79% in 2010. In 2010, an estimated 11 million South Africans still did not have access to improved sanitation: They and used shared facilities (4 million), bucket toilets (3 million) or practiced open defecation (4 million).

According to Statistics South Africa, access is higher, partially because it includes shared facilities in its definition of sanitation. According to the 2011 census figures, access to sanitation increased from 83% in 2001 to 91% in 2011, including shared and individual pit latrines as well as chemical toilets. The share of households with access to flush toilets increased from 53% in 2001 to 60% in 2011. The health impacts of inadequate sanitation can be serious, as evidenced by the estimated 1.5 million cases of diarrhoea in children under five and the 2001 outbreak of cholera. While most coliforms are harmless to human health, the presence of E. coli, which covers approximately 97% of coliform bacteria found in the intestines of animals and in faeces, underlines the presence of more harmful pathogens in the water system (DWAF 1996b).

South Africa's sewage system has largely collapsed. Globally, on average, annual maintenance to plants amounts to 15% of the plant's value but in South Africa only 1% of the plant's value is spent on annual maintenance. Of 824 water treatment plants, only around 60 release clean water. Every second, 50 000 litres of untreated sewage flows into rivers throughout the country.

== Service quality ==
=== Water quality and continuity of supply ===
Service quality is highly variable and data is sketchy. In 2003, 63% of municipalities were not able to say if they met drinking water quality standards or not. Water supply to 37% of households was interrupted for at least one day in 2003. Customers did not and often still do not trust that drinking water quality is adequate. This is why the Department of Water Affairs introduced in 2008 a so-called "blue drop" incentive-based water quality regulation strategy. Under the strategy municipal service providers are certified with a "blue drop" if they fulfill certain requirements. These include not only compliance with water quality standards, but also the existence of a water safety plan, process controlling and the credibility of sample results, among others.

The system is regarded internationally as unique in the drinking water regulatory domain and has been well received by the World Health Organization. However, observers from the private sector say that a "strong spin element" surrounds the programme and that water quality is actually deteriorating nationally, "while the government attempts to discredit commentators who persist in their view that there is a problem". In 2009, 23 water supply systems obtained the Blue Drop certification. In 2010, 9 lost it and 24 gained it for the first time, bringing the total to 38 (less than 5 percent) out of 787 systems that were assessed. The three top performers were Johannesburg, Cape Town and the small town of Bitou.

Water supply is increasingly under pressure. Eutrophication is a growing concern, with about one third of the total volume of water held in strategic storage approaching the point where it is no longer fit for purpose without significant and costly management intervention. Return flows out of mining areas, particularly from gold mining activities, are rapidly deteriorating, with highly acidic water starting to decant from abandoned and derelict mines.

=== Wastewater treatment ===
55% of wastewater treatment plants, especially smaller ones, do not meet effluent standards and some do not even measure effluent quality. In analogy to the blue drop certification system for drinking water, the government has launched a green drop certification for municipal wastewater treatment. As of May 2011, 7 out of 159 water supply authorities were certified with the green drop, and 32 out of 1,237 wastewater treatment plants. In 2009, when 449 wastewater treatment plants were assessed, according to official government data 7% were classified as excellently managed, 38% "performed within acceptable standards" and 55% did not perform within acceptable standards.

According to Bluewater Bio, an international firm specialised in wastewater treatment, out of 1,600 wastewater treatment plants in South Africa – not all of which were included in the Green Drop assessment – at least 60% are not meeting regulatory compliance requirements. According to a study by the South African Water Research Commission in partnership with the South African Local Government Association published in June 2013, 44% of wastewater treatment plants included in a representative sample used inappropriate and unnecessarily expensive technologies. There is a lack of funding for maintenance because of low tariffs, insufficient collection and the absence of ring-fencing of revenues for the purpose of maintaining assets, so that municipalities "run assets to failure".

== Stakeholders ==
The public water and sanitation sector in South Africa is organised in three different tiers:

- The national government, represented by the Department of Water and Sanitation (DWS), as a policy setter.
- Water Boards, which provide primarily bulk water, but also some retail services and operate some wastewater treatment plants, in addition to playing a role in water resources management;
- Municipalities, which provide most retail services and also own some of the bulk supply infrastructure.

Banks, the professional association WISA, the Water Research Commission and civil society also are important stakeholders in the sector.

=== Policy and regulation ===
The Department of Water Affairs (DWA) in the Ministry of Water and Environmental Affairs is primarily responsible for the formulation and implementation of policy governing water resources management as well as drinking water supply. Concerning sanitation, "there is a worrying absence of regulation [...] at all levels of government", according to an independent report. Around 2010 the sanitation function has been moved from DWA to the Department of Human Settlement (DHS), although some regulatory functions apparently remain with DWA, "causing institutional confusion over roles and responsibilities".

=== Service provision ===
Responsibility for service provision is shared among various entities: The country's 231 municipalities are in charge of water distribution and sanitation either directly or indirectly through municipally owned enterprises or private companies; government-owned water boards are in charge of operating bulk water supply infrastructure and some wastewater systems; and the Trans-Caledon Tunnel Authority finances and develops dams and bulk water supply infrastructure.

Map showing the districts (numbered) of South Africa: Eastern Cape; Free State; Gauteng; KwaZulu-Natal; Limpopo; Mpumalanga; North West; Northern Cape; Western Cape

Municipalities. According to the Constitution, the Municipal Structures Act and the Water Services Act of 1997 responsibility for the provision of water and sanitation services lies with water services authorities, which the Water Services Act defines as the municipalities. There are 52 district municipalities and 231 local municipalities in South Africa (see Municipalities of South Africa).

In many cases, the district municipalities are the water services authorities. However, the national government can assign responsibility for service provision to local municipalities. Overall, there are 169 water services authorities in South Africa, including water boards, district municipalities, local municipalities and municipal companies. Usually municipalities provide water and sanitation services directly through a municipal unit or department. For example, eThekwini (Durban) provides these services through the eThekwini Water and Sanitation Unit.

However, they can delegate this responsibility to a water services provider for a defined period. For example, in 2001 the city of Johannesburg created Johannesburg Water, a legally and financially independent company wholly owned by the municipality. This was done as part of a "Transformation Plan" embarked upon by the Greater Johannesburg Municipal Authority at the time. Johannesburg Water has committed itself to comply with the provisions of the King Report on Corporate Governance, including affirmative action, transparency, performance evaluation, a code of ethics, professional risk management and sustainability reporting.

The 1996 constitution strengthened the autonomy of municipalities. As a consequence, the responsibility for rural water supply and sanitation has been transferred from the national government, represented by DWAF, to municipalities.

Private sector participation. Since 1994 some municipalities have involved the private sector in service provision in various forms, including contracts for specific services such as wastewater treatment, short-term management contracts and long-term concessions.

Water Boards. The 13 government-owned Water Boards play a key role in the South African water sector. They operate dams, bulk water supply infrastructure, some retail infrastructure and some wastewater systems. Some also provide technical assistance to municipalities.

Trans-Caledon Tunnel Authority. The Trans-Caledon Tunnel Authority (TCTA) is a state-owned entity with the mission to finance and implement bulk raw water infrastructure. It was created in 1986 to develop the Lesotho Highland Water Project, a joint project between Lesotho and South Africa. As of 2012, TCTA has developed or is developing six other dam and bulk water supply projects throughout the country, including the Berg River Dam. TCTA sells bulk water to the government, represented by the Department of Water as the owner of the Water Boards that treat the water and sell it on to municipalities and mines. TCTA uses these revenues mainly to repay the debt it has raised to finance its infrastructure, its operating costs and to pay royalties to the government of Lesotho.

=== Others ===
Research, training and knowledge. South Africa has a fairly strong research and training infrastructure in the water sector. The Water Research Commission (WRC) supports water research and development as well as the building of a sustainable water research capacity in South Africa. It serves as the country's water-centred knowledge 'hub' leading the creation, dissemination and application of water-centred knowledge, focusing on water resource management, water-linked ecosystems, water use and waste management and water utilisation in agriculture.

The Water Institute of Southern Africa (WISA), a professional association, keeps its members abreast of the latest developments in water technology and research through its national and international liaison, links and affiliations.

Financiers and promoters. The Development Bank of Southern Africa (DBSA) is an important player in the water and sanitation sector, both as a financier and as an advisor and project promoter. In 2005–2006 about 29% of its approved projects were for water supply (1,881 million Rand) and sanitation (165 million Rand). Other financing institutions in the sector include the Infrastructure Finance Corporation Limited, which claims to be the only 100% privately owned infrastructure debt fund in the world.

Civil society. South Africa has a vibrant civil society, comprising a large number of non-governmental organisations (NGOs) with very diverse goals, membership and methods. On the one hand, civil society includes militant so-called "new social movements" that sprang up after the end of Apartheid, such as the Western Cape Anti-Eviction Campaign formed in 2000 and the shack dweller organisation Abahlali baseMjondolo formed in 2005. They fight water cut-offs for non-payment and are engaged in "mass popular appropriation" of water services. These groups claim to represent the poorest and most oppressed people in South Africa.

On the other hand, civil society in South Africa includes the Mvula trust which has disbursed over R300 million to water services programmes and projects and has provided services to over a million South Africans who previously did not have access to either water or sanitation services. It is specialised in implementing and supporting the delivery of water services in rural and peri-urban areas through community management, the establishment of community based water services providers and supporting local authorities to create an enabling environment for sustainability.

== Human resources ==
South Africa experiences a brain drain that also affects the availability of qualified engineers in water and sanitation utilities. The number of civil engineers in municipalities has declined from 20 per 100,000 inhabitants in 1994 to 2.8 in 2009.

One reason is the official policy of cadre deployment, whereby persons loyal to the ruling party, the African National Congress, are given jobs in different branches of government. This intransparent process puts party loyalty ahead of competence and demoralises public service employees, according to a 2012 study by the Human Sciences Research Council. Skilled staff are concentrated at the national and provincial levels, but there is a skills deficit at the municipal level. South Africa does not have a unified civil service, so that there are no uniform standards for hiring and promotion at the municipal level. According to the study, there is also a high level of turnover of middle and senior managers in the civil service, due to stressful working conditions and opportunities for qualified professionals in the private sector.

== History and recent developments ==
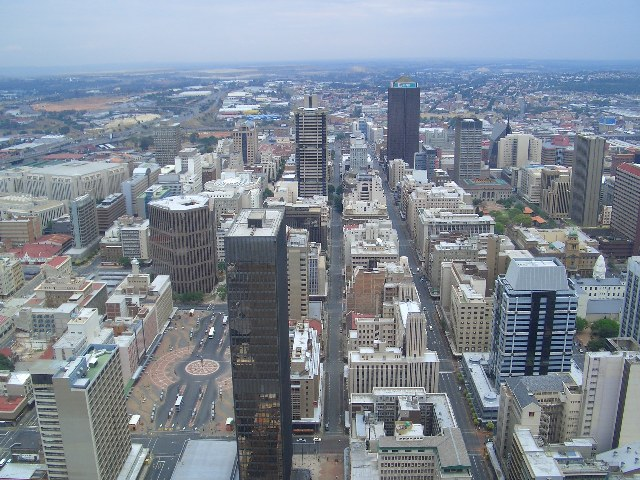
The skyline of Johannesburg's Central Business District as seen from the observatory of the Carlton Centre

During Apartheid, the national government had no role in providing public water or sanitation services.

The history of the water supply and sanitation sector since the end of Apartheid has been characterised by a strong government commitment to increase access to services and a gradual reduction of the role of Water Boards and the national government in service provision.

There has been tension between the goal of increased cost recovery enshrined in the Water Services Act on the one hand, and the constitutional rights introduced in 1996 and the policy of free basic water introduced in 2001 on the other hand. There have been a number of controversies on policies in the sectors, including about private sector participation, which was introduced in the mid-1990s, the practice of cutting off water or installing flow restrictors for those who do not pay their bills, and the installation of pre-paid meters.

=== Transition ===
In 1994, the first post-Apartheid government assigned the Department of Water Affairs and Forestry the task of ensuring that all South Africans would have "equitable access to water supply and sanitation". To that end, the Community Water Supply and Sanitation Program was created to target key areas for instituting water and sanitation systems, and the National Sanitation Program was established to increase the rate of distribution of water and sanitation services.

The passing of the Constitution of the Republic of South Africa in 1996 created a new, constitutional dispensation with a guaranteed Bill of Rights. Among those rights are the section 24(a) right to an environment that is not harmful to health or well-being, and the section 27(1)(b) right to sufficient water.

The government also created new policies such as the Water Services Act, the National Environmental Management Act (NEMA) of 1998, and the National Water Act (NWA) of 1998 in order to target water and sanitation problems.

=== Water Services Act of 1997 ===
In 1994 the government published its first White Paper on Water and Sanitation Policy, which led to the Water Services Act of 1997.

The Act calls for higher cost recovery, which proved a challenge due to widespread poverty and a culture of non-payment for water in many Townships, as a remnant of protests against Apartheid. Higher water tariffs and rigorous cut-offs for non-payment, or flow reductions through the installation of "tricklers" that allow only a very limited flow of water, imposed hardships on the poorest.

The Act also modified the role of Water Boards, providing a clear legal definition of the functions of Water Boards and municipalities. Water Boards have historically been the only bulk water providers. Municipalities were obliged to buy water through them. The Act allowed municipalities to develop their own bulk water supply infrastructure or to buy bulk water from providers other than Water Boards. Conversely it also allowed Water Boards to provide retail water services at the request of municipalities. Since the Act has been passed the capacity of both Water Boards and many water service providers has increased significantly.

=== Municipal Systems Act of 2000 ===
The Municipal Systems Act (MSA) placed the responsibility for water services on local governments. It thus became each city's responsibility to provide basic water and sanitation services for all residents. The funding for improvements to water and sanitation systems would come from the national government via the Municipal Infrastructure Grant MIG or Equitable Shares, or via local revenue collection.

=== Free Basic Water Policy ===
Durban was the first South African city to introduce a policy of free basic water in 1998. After Thabo Mbeki became President of South Africa in 1999 and a cholera outbreak occurred in 2000, the African National Congress promised free basic water during a municipal election campaign in December 2000. In July 2001 free basic water became a national policy through a revised tariff structure that included at least 6 "kilolitres" (cubic meters) of free water per month (40-litre per capita per day for a family of five or 25-litre per capita per day for a family of eight). The policy was being implemented gradually within the means of each municipality.

=== Management contract for Johannesburg and pre-paid meters ===
Johannesburg management contract. Building on earlier experiences with private sector participation since 1994, a five-year management contract for water services in Johannesburg, South Africa's largest city and the country's economic and financial hub, was awarded in 2000 to the Joint Venture Water and Sanitation Services South Africa (WSSA). The Johannesburg management contract was not renewed when it expired in 2005. However, private operators continue to provide services in many other South African cities.

Prepaid meters. 170,000 prepaid meters were installed in poor townships of Johannesburg, including in Soweto. Prepaid meters were also installed in other cities as part of management contracts with private operators. These meters, which cut off water supply above the 6 cubic meter monthly limit if no payment is made, sparked substantial protests in poor neighbourhoods. Residents of Phiri, a neighborhood in Soweto, sued against prepaid meters with the support of South African and international anti-privatisation activists in what has been called the Mazibuko case, named after the first plaintiff.

In April 2008 the South African High Court found the practice of prepaid meters in Soweto unconstitutional, and wrote that denying the poor access to adequate water "is to deny them the rights to health and to lead a dignified lifestyle." Further, the judge stated that "25 liters per person per day is insufficient for the residents of Phiri", and ordered the city to provide free basic water in the amount of 50 liters per person per day with the option of an ordinary credit-metered water supply (instead of prepaid) for more use. The Court apparently assumed a household size of eight.

In October 2009 the Constitutional Court overturned the case and declared prepaid meters to be lawful. The court case led to the development of a more social practice concerning prepaid meters. For example, the minimum amount can be increased from 6 m^{3} per month to 10 or even 15 m^{3} per month depending on the level of poverty and size of a household. Also, new prepaid meters still deliver a minimum amount of 40 liter per hour under low pressure after service is cut off. Furthermore, 1000 liter of "emergency water" can be used four times per year, for example to extinguish fires, even if bills should not have been paid. 2000 liter of additional water can be granted by local authorities on demand for special needs. However, not all residents are aware of these fairly complex mechanisms.

=== History and developments of water infrastructure in Johannesburg ===
Reliable and consistent water supply in Johannesburg has been a longstanding challenge. In 1903, the Water Works Commission established the Rand Water board to manage bulk water supply in the region. Its responsibilities included sourcing raw water, treatment and purification, distribution through a regional network, storage in reservoirs and towers, and delivery of potable water to consumers.

In recent years, water infrastructure in Johannesburg has required ongoing maintenance and investment. Planned maintenance programmes were announced for December 2025 and January 2026. The city also procured additional water tankers to mitigate the impact of supply disruptions.

=== Basic Sanitation White Paper ===
In response to the fact that access to sanitation lags significantly behind access to water, the government published its White Paper on Basic Household Sanitation in 2001. It called for universal access to basic sanitation by March 2010, with priority accorded to communities with the greatest needs. The policy outlines the roles of the various stakeholders – households, municipalities, provincial governments, various branches of national government – and establishes coordination and monitoring mechanisms.

It also calls for Infrastructure Grants to municipalities to finance investments in sanitation. The paper notes that it is the government's policy to provide free basic services to the poorest, but does not spell out how this policy will be implemented in the case of basic sanitation.

=== Decentralisation ===
Following a second White Paper on water supply and sanitation policy published in 2002 (after the first White Paper in 1994) a national policy was established to further decentralise the sector, phasing out the national government's involvement in service provision, limiting DWAF's role to policy and regulation.

In rural areas this policy of decentralisation has been supported by the Masibambane program, a sector-wide approach linked to budget-based donor support for rural water supply and sanitation. The initial investment was ZAR 2.2 billion (EUR 279 million) with a focus on the three poorest provinces and a target to reach about 2.5 million people. A 2004 evaluation by the Water and Sanitation Program (WSP) Africa showed that the program performed well financially. The program is now in its third phase.

=== National Sanitation Strategy, Bucket Eradication Programme and Free Basic Sanitation Implementation Strategy ===
In February 2005 the government launched a programme to eradicate the use of bucket toilets. Bucket toilets consist of a bucket placed under a toilet seat; in formally established settlements the buckets are emptied on a daily basis by the municipality and the content is brought to a sewage treatment plant. However, buckets are also used in newly established informal settlements. There were 250,000 bucket toilets in formally established settlements as of 2005. There was a strong political will to carry out the program. As of March 2008, 91% of the bucket toilets were replaced by flush toilets or Ventilated Improved Pit Latrines where water was not readily available.

However, communities resisted the construction of latrines, forcing construction to a standstill and asked for flush toilets. There had been no community participation in the choice of technologies. The programme was very much focused on the provision of infrastructure, with little emphasis on sustainability and hygiene promotion, so that the health impact was limited. The deadline to complete the program was moved from 2007 to 2010.

In August 2005 a National Sanitation Strategy was published. It covers, among other things, "the roles and responsibilities in sanitation delivery, planning for sanitation, funding sanitation, implementation approaches, regulating the sanitation sector, and monitoring and evaluation". It was followed by a Free Basic Sanitation Implementation Strategy in March 2009, with the aim of reaching universal access to sanitation by 2014. According to one observer, the strategy was "deliberately vague" because the issue of free provision of sanitation services is so controversial. There is no legal obligation to provide free basic sanitation. The implementation strategy includes eight different options to channel subsidies. The policy was piloted in 17 municipalities in 2010, and in a further 23 municipalities in 2011, although it is unclear which subsidy mechanism is being used.

=== Partnerships ===
South Africa has formed partnerships and engaged in discussions with several nations, including Denmark, the Netherlands, and Israel, to enhance its water supply and sanitation infrastructure. For instance, South Africa engaged in a Strategic Sector Cooperation with Denmark in 2015, focusing on strengthening water resilience and preparing for water sector reforms. It signed a Blue Deal agreement with the Netherlands in 2020 to support water management and facilitate the exchange of knowledge and experience. Additionally, South Africa engaged with high-level water delegations from Israel in 2023 to learn from its success in water sustainability and agricultural development in arid environments

=== List of ministers in charge of water ===
Ministers of Water Affairs and Forestry

- Dr. Kader Asmal (1994–1999)
- Ronnie Kasrils (1999–2004)
- Buyelwa Sonjica (2004–2006)
- Lindiwe Hendricks (2006–2009)

Ministers of Water and Environmental Affairs:

- Buyelwa Sonjica (2009–2010)
- Edna Molewa (2010-2014)

Ministers of Water and Sanitation:

- Nomvula Mokonyane (2014-2018)
- Gugile Nkwinti (2018-2019)

Ministers of Human Settlements, Water and Sanitation

- Lindiwe Sisulu (since 2019)

== Efficiency ==
One indicator to measure the technical efficiency of water utilities is the level of non-revenue water. In a well-managed utility that level should be below about 25%. In Johannesburg, the estimated level declined from 44% in 2003 to 31% in 2006. In Durban it stood at an estimated average of 31% between 2002 and 2006. In Cape Town the estimates fluctuated significantly between 10% and 37%, suggesting that the estimates may not be reliable. The average level of non-revenue water for South African utilities participating in the International Benchmarking Network for Water and Sanitation Utilities in the 2002–2006 period was 31%.

== Financial aspects ==
=== Tariff level ===
Tariffs include bulk water tariffs charged by water boards to municipalities and retail water tariffs charged by municipalities to users.

Bulk water tariffs vary greatly. In 2011 the largest water board, Rand Water, charged Rand 3.97 (US$0.48) per cubic meter. The highest bulk water tariff (Rand 9.11 or US$1.10 per cubic meter) was charged by the financially crippled Namakwa Water Board, while the lowest tariff (Rand 2.28 or US$0.28) was charged by the Pelladrift Water Board.

Retail water tariffs vary between municipalities and between user categories, with non-residential users being charged higher tariffs than residential users. Typically water tariffs also vary with consumption, with higher tariffs applied to higher consumption. The average retail water tariff in 2006 for a sample of cities and across all consumption levels was estimated to be the equivalent of US$1.06 per cubic meter.

In 2010 Johannesburg water provided between 6 and 15 cubic meters of water per month for free, depending on the poverty level of residents. For those considered not poor, the tariff for the tranche between 6 and 10 cubic meters was R4.93 (US$0.73), for the tranche up to 15 cubic meters it was R7.31 (US$1.08) and so on until R14.94 (US$2.21) for a consumption exceeding 40 cubic meters per month. The bill for 10 cubic meters per month thus is R20. Poor households have to register themselves as "indigent" (poor), which – according to critics – leads to a situation where only a fraction of the poor receive the higher free basic water allocation to which they are eligible.

In Cape Town water tariffs for the first block beyond free basic water are slightly lower than in Johannesburg at R4.55 until 10 cubic meters, and the next tranche at R9.7 is broader than in Johannesburg covering until 20 cubic meters per month, with R23,42 charged beyond 50 cubic meters, resulting in a steeper tariff structure. The water bill for 10 cubic meters per month is R18. The sewer charge is 70% of the water charge.

Durban distinguishes between a lower tariff for semi-pressure service for houses in low-income settlements with roof tanks and a higher full pressure service for "formal" housing areas. Semi-pressure service is free until 9 cubic meters, while full-pressure service costs R9.50 per cubic meter until 9 cubic meters per month, and R11.25 until 25 cubic meters. The bill for 10 cubic meters per month is R7 for semi-pressure service and R97 for full-pressure service. There is also a free low-pressure service for ground tanks in informal and rural areas, under which water is pumped once a day to fill a 200 litres ground tank.

=== Free basic water ===
South Africa has introduced a policy of free basic services, including water, electricity and solid waste collection. As part of that policy, every household is to receive the first 6 cubic meters per month for free. The policy was introduced gradually since 2000 within the means of each municipality. Each municipality decides if free basic water is made available to everyone or only to the poor. Most municipalities provide free basic water to all or almost all their residents. In 2012 the program reached 86% of all households.

Based on an average consumption of 5 cubic meters of free water per household and month, an estimated 8 million beneficiary households, and an estimated water supply cost of 4 Rand per cubic meter, the annual cost of the policy can be estimated at 2bn Rand (US$280m). This corresponds to about 0.1% of GDP in 2011, or about 0.25% of government expenditures. Another estimate puts the cost of free basic water at 5.84 Rand per capita per month, which corresponds to 2.2bn Rand per year.

Out of the 32 million people that received free basic water in 2005, almost half, or 15 million, were not poor. Furthermore, many poor in rural areas, who receive limited amounts of water for free through standpipes, do not benefit fully. Those without access to publicly provided water do not benefit at all from the program. The policy is more successful in wealthier municipalities, which have the ability to cross-subsidise water provision for the poor, than in poorer, often rural municipalities. This is one of the reasons why in 2009 the government announced it would review its implementation strategy for free basic water, possibly through registers of poor users.

As part of this review process, Durban has now changed its implementation of the free basic water policy: Households living in properties that are valued above a certain threshold now must prove that their income is below the poverty limit, in order to continue to receive free basic water. The reason for the change was that most of those benefiting from free basic water were not poor. They used less than amount of free basic water – 9 cubic meters per month in the case of Durban – for the simple reason that there were two or less residents in the household.

=== Affordability ===
There is little information available on their affordability, i.e. the share of water bills in household income. If a household consumes less than the free basic water limit, the share is obviously zero. For a household in Cape Town that has no sewer connection and consumes 10 cubic meters of water, the monthly water bill is almost R20 or US$2.40. With the poverty line at R500 per capita and month, the monthly income of a four-person household at the poverty line would be R2000, and the water bill would be 1 percent of income. However, according to another source the poverty level in South Africa was only R1000 per household, in which case the share of the water bill would be 2 percent of income, and higher for those living below the poverty line.

=== Cost recovery ===
In 2010, eleven of the 13 water boards were financially viable. The exceptions were Namakwa and Bushbuckridge water boards. Municipalities owed the water boards more than Rand 1.3bn (about US$200 million). There is little information available on cost recovery at the municipal level, partly because revenues and costs associated with water supply and sanitation are not necessarily accounted for separately in municipal budgets. If Water Services Authorities prepare water and sanitation budgets, asset replacement costs (depreciation) are often not included in budgets. Furthermore, the policy of free basic water leads to deficits in the supply of these services. Municipalities cover these deficits in large part through the "equitable share" transfers from national government.

=== Investment ===
According to the 2008 Infrastructure Barometer published by DBSA and based on figures provided by the National Treasury, total municipal investments in water supply and sanitation in 2007 were 13.4 billion Rand (US$1.9 billion at the 2007 exchange rate), broken down as follows:

- 5.6 billion Rand for water supply by municipalities
- 4.7 billion Rand for sanitation by municipalities
- 1.0 billion Rand for water resources development by Water Boards
- 1.0 billion Rand for water resources development by DWAF
- 1.1 billion Rand for water resources development by the Trans-Caledon Tunnel Authority (TCTA)

Municipal investments in the sector increased substantially from 2001 when they were about four times less than in 2007 at 2.8 billion Rand.

In 2010/11 total spending by the Department of Water Affairs was 8.2 billion Rand, including compensation for employees (1.2 bn), consultants for the design and supervision of civil works (0.6 bn) and investments. Investments include direct expenditures for TCTA and indirect expenditures in the form of transfers to Water Boards and Water Service Authorities (municipalities), mostly for dams, bulk water transfers and water treatment plants. The largest project under construction is the De Hoop Dam which is part of the Olifants River Water Resources Development Programme that provides water for mining and municipal uses.

=== Financing ===
Municipal water and sanitation investments were financed from the following sources in 2003–06:

- 51% through inter-governmental grants;
- 19% through borrowing; and
- 30% through internal cash generation.

The larger municipalities rely more on loans and on internal cash generation, while the smaller ones depend more on grants and other sources of funding. Wealthier municipalities partially finance free basic water through cross-subsidies from non-residential users and local tax revenue.

All municipalities receive a constitutionally mandated share of national tax revenues as an unconditional recurrent grant, called "equitable share". One of its objectives is to offset the cost of free basic water and free basic electricity. The formula provides higher grants to those municipalities that have a high number of poor among those that receive water services. If a municipality increases access to water, its share in the transfers thus also increases. The number of poor is determined through census data, which – according to some municipalities – underestimates the actual extent of poverty.

In the 2012/13 budget the total equitable share was Rand 37.8 billion (US$4.6bn). In addition there is a Municipal Infrastructure Grant (MIG). The MIG programme is aimed at providing all South Africans with at least a basic level of service by the year 2013 through the provision of grant finance to cover the capital cost of basic infrastructure for the poor. In the 2012/13 budget the allocation for MIGs was Rand 13.8 billion (US$1.7 billion). In addition, there is a Capacity Building Grant. All these grants are administered by the Department of Cooperative Governance and Traditional Affairs (formerly the Department of Provincial and Local Government).

== See also ==
- List of water supply and sanitation by country
- Sanitation worker
- Water supply and sanitation in Sub-Saharan Africa
- Water pollution in Southern Africa
- Western Cape Water Supply System
