= Theewaterskloof =

Theewaterskloof may refer to:

- Theewaterskloof Dam, near Villiersdorp, Western Cape, South Africa
- Theewaterskloof Local Municipality, governing Villiersdorp and the surrounding area in the Western Cape, South Africa
