= Water management device =

Hose

Water management devices are water meters which, at once provide accurate data on water flow and water consumption levels, and can be programmed to control water use at household- or business-level. This is valuable for consumer who can ensure that they stay within a certain level of consumption, allowing savings on water costs, or for water suppliers who wish to reduce overall water consumption due to lack of water supply or increased demand.

== Utilization ==
=== South Africa ===
Water management devices are widely distributed throughout South African municipalities as a way to regulate water consumption in indigent households (those household who do not have the means to meet their own needs). They have also been used to drastically reduce water demand during the Cape Town Water Crisis: devices were deployed on households which were not reducing their consumption below 10500 litres per month and were programmed to halt water flow if the household past 350 litres per day.

Smart meters were also employed to help users identify maintenance issues in their water systems. A large effort was extended to install smart meters in schools around the city, enabling schools to detect leak and improve the maintenance of their system. The savings from reduced water payments have enabled schools to invest funds elsewhere. Smart meters can also be used in communities who are serviced by standpipes to monitor the flow of water and report leakage or dysfunction.

Installation of water management devices in Cape Town, South Africa has led to complaints by residents who perceive this intervention as a draconian, unilateral action by the City. The use of households as units may also be problematic as the city stated an assumption of 4 people per household. For any households with less or more people, the allocation of 350 litres per day is not necessarily accurate.
