= Stormsvlei =

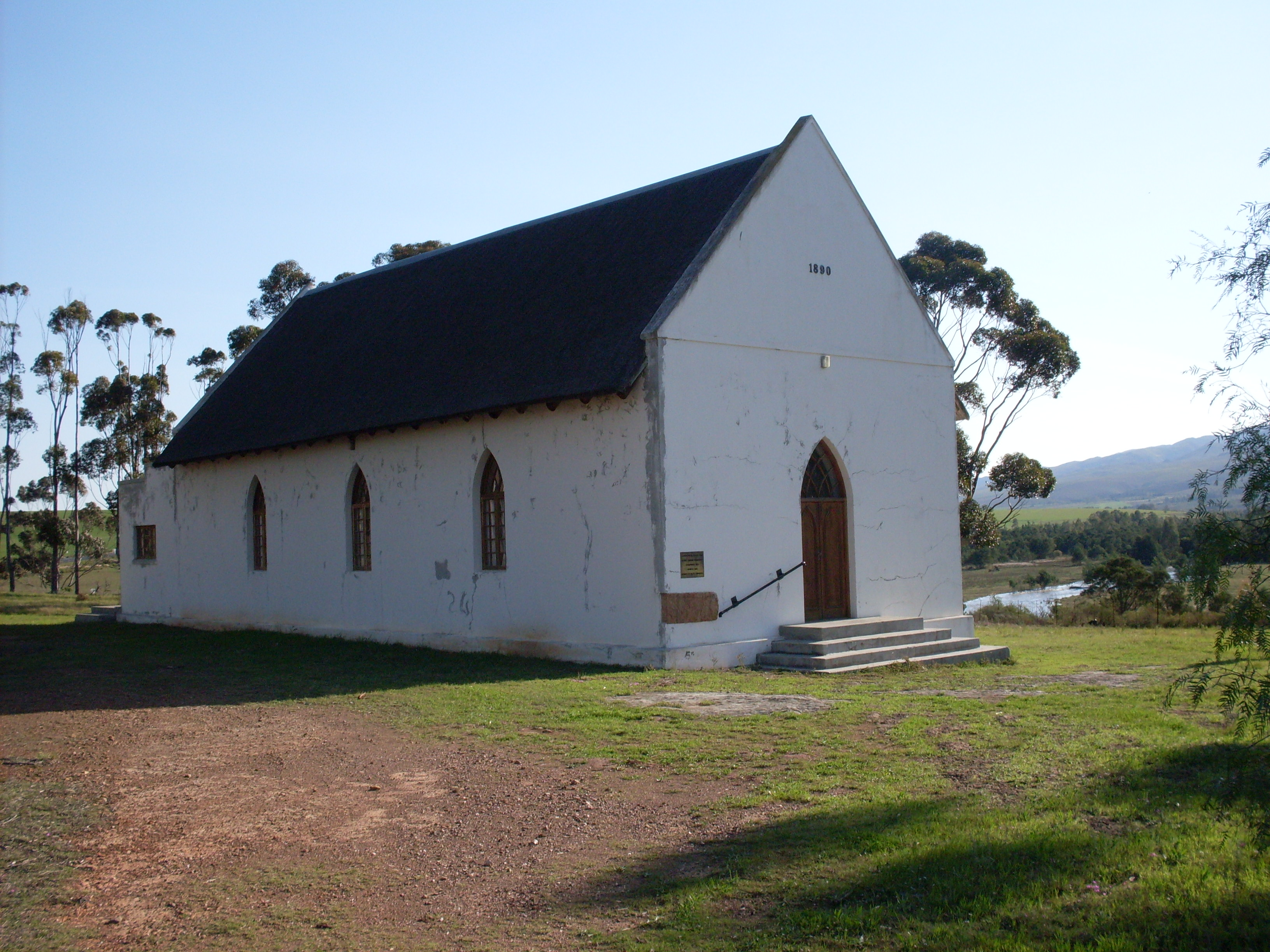
- Stormsvlei Church

- Location within Western Cape Location within South Africa
- Coordinates: 34.083°S 20.097°E
- Country: South Africa
- Province: Western Cape
- District: Overberg
- Municipality: Swellendam

Population
  - Total: 987

Racial Makeup (2011)
  - Coloured: 64.7%
  - White: 18.1%
  - Black African: 16.8%
  - Other: 0.4%

First Languages (2011)
  - Afrikaans: 85.7%
  - Xhosa: 10.9%
  - English: 2.5%
  - Other: 0.8%
- Time zone: UTC+2 (SAST)
- PO box: 7252

Stormsvlei is a town on the southern bank of the Riviersonderend, some 17 km south of Bonnievale and 50 km north of Bredasdorp. Of Afrikaans origin, the name means 'storm marsh'.

As of 2011 the town's population was 987 people living in 282 households.

== History ==
By 1732, grazing rights were already granted here, but apparently they were not used. Fifty years later, in 1782, the farm known as Avontuur was awarded to Christiaan Andreas Storm and the town was named after him, hence the name 'Stormsvlei'.

In 1841 the farm came into the ownership of cousins Laurence and William Twentyman. They were good businessmen and developed here at the intersection of the route from the Cape to the eastern districts of the Cape Colony and of the route from the interior (via Kogmanskloof, Ashton and Bonnievale) to the sea at Agulhas a popular stopover.

In its prime, Stormsvlei had a hotel with a bar. There was a wagon maker and a blacksmith, stables, a mill and even a post office, a police station and a prison. Only the church still exists. The old mansion is now a guest house.
