= Wemmershoek Dam =

- Interactive map of Wemmershoek Dam
- Location: Western Cape, South Africa
- Coordinates: 33°50′1″S 19°5′20″E
- Purpose: Water supply
- Opening date: 1957
- Owner: City of Cape Town

Dam and spillways
- Type of dam: Rock-fill dam
- Impounds: Wemmershoek River
- Height: 55 m (180 ft)
- Length: 518 m (1,699 ft)

Reservoir
- Creates: Wemmershoek Dam Reservoir
- Total capacity: 58,644 Ml (2,071.0×10^{6} cu ft)
- Catchment area: 86 km^{2} (33 sq mi)
- Surface area: 296 ha (730 acres)

Map of the Wemmershoek Dam and its catchment area

Wemmershoek Dam is a rock-fill type dam located on the Wemmershoek River near Franschhoek and Paarl in South Africa. It was constructed between 1953 and 1957 on behalf of the City of Cape Town. With a reservoir capacity of 58,644 megalitres (2,071.0×10^{6} cu ft), it provides approximately 6.5% of the storage capacity of the Western Cape Water Supply System which supplies Cape Town and surrounding areas.

== History ==
As early as 1882 the Cape Colony's hydrographic surveyor reported on the potential of the Wemmershoek valley for water supply. In 1899 the municipal council of Woodstock, then an independent suburb of Cape Town, began purchasing land at Wemmershoek with the aim of building a reservoir. In 1907 the councils of Woodstock, Mowbray, Rondebosch and Claremont obtained a private bill from the colonial parliament authorising the construction of a small dam at Wemmershoek.

In 1913 the four suburban councils were incorporated into the City of Cape Town, which took over their rights at Wemmershoek. Water shortages demanded that Cape Town, which had until then relied on water supplies from Table Mountain, find a source of water from outside the Cape Peninsula. The two leading candidates were the Wemmershoek catchment and the Steenbras catchment in the Hottentots Holland mountains. A ratepayers' referendum decided on Steenbras which led to the construction of the Steenbras Dam starting in 1918.

After the Second World War, with the growth of Cape Town's urban population, the city again needed to find an additional water supply. The Wemmershoek scheme was revived, and a new private bill was passed by Parliament in 1951 for the construction of a larger dam. Construction began in 1953 and was completed in 1957.

== Characteristics ==
The dam wall is of rock-fill type with a clay core. It is 518 metres (1,699 ft) long and 55 metres (180 ft) tall at its highest point. The dam impounds a reservoir of 58,644 megalitres (2,071.0×10^{6} cu ft) capacity which, when full, covers an area of 296 hectares (730 acres). Its catchment area in the Wemmershoek Mountains covers an area of 86 square kilometres (33 sq mi). An intake tower draws water into a pipeline which supplies a water treatment plant at the foot of the dam. Releases of water into the Wemmershoek River are by way of a gate-controlled spillway with a maximum flow of 1,065 cubic metres per second (37,600 cu ft/s).

== See also ==
- List of reservoirs and dams in South Africa
