= Water Boards in South Africa =

Water management authorities in South Africa

Water Boards play a key role in the South African water sector. They operate dams, bulk water supply infrastructure, some retail infrastructure and some wastewater systems. Some also provide technical assistance to municipalities. Through their role in the operation of dams they also play an important role in water resources management. The Water Boards report to the Department of Water Affairs (DWA). The Water Boards in South Africa (see list below), together indirectly served more than 24 million people in 90 municipalities in 2005, or about half the population of South Africa.

The three largest Water Boards - Rand Water in Gauteng Province, Umgeni Water in KwaZulu Natal Province and Overberg Water – indirectly serve 10 million, 4 million and 2 million people respectively. This is three times as much (18 million) as all the 12 smaller water boards together (6 million). Rand Water has a more than 100-year history in the Gauteng area, the industrial heartland of South Africa. It buys water from DWA, treats it and sells it to large industries, mines and municipalities.

== List of Water Boards in South Africa ==
- Amatola Water Board (East London, Eastern Cape) now incorporates Albany Coast Water Board which served the Boesmansriviermond area, Eastern Cape)
- Bloem Water (Bloemfontein, Free State)
- Lepelle Northern Water (Phalaborwa, Limpopo)
- Magalies Water (Tehabane - Rustenburg, North West)
- Mhlathuze Water (Richards Bay, KwaZulu Natal)
- Overberg Water (Heidelberg CP, Western Cape)
- Rand Water (Johannesburg, Gauteng)
- Sedibeng Water (Bothaville, Free State) (formerly Goudveld Water)
- Umgeni Water (Pietermaritzburg, KwaZulu Natal) (Regional Office located in Durban)

The following stock-watering Water Boards are to be transformed into water user associations (see National Water Act section 98(1)):

- Kalahari East Water Board (Upington, Northern Cape) (formerly Kalahari-Oos Waterraad)
- Kalahari West Water Board (Upington, Northern Cape)
- Karos-Geelkoppen Water Board (Joostepan, Northern Cape)

== Disestablished Water Boards ==
- Botshelo Water (Mmabatho, North West) (formerly Bophuthatswana Water Supply Authority and then the North-West Water Supply Authority Board) (disestablished 1 April 2014)
- Bushbuckridge Water Board (Mafmani/Nelspruit, Mpumalanga) (disestablished 1 April 2014)
- Namakwa Water (Nababeep, Northern Cape) (disestablished 8 April 2011)
- Nkangala Water board (Belfast, Mpumalanga) (disestablished)
- Pelladrift Water Board (Northern Cape) (disestablished 30 October 2014)
