= Sonderend River =

River in the Western Cape, South Africa

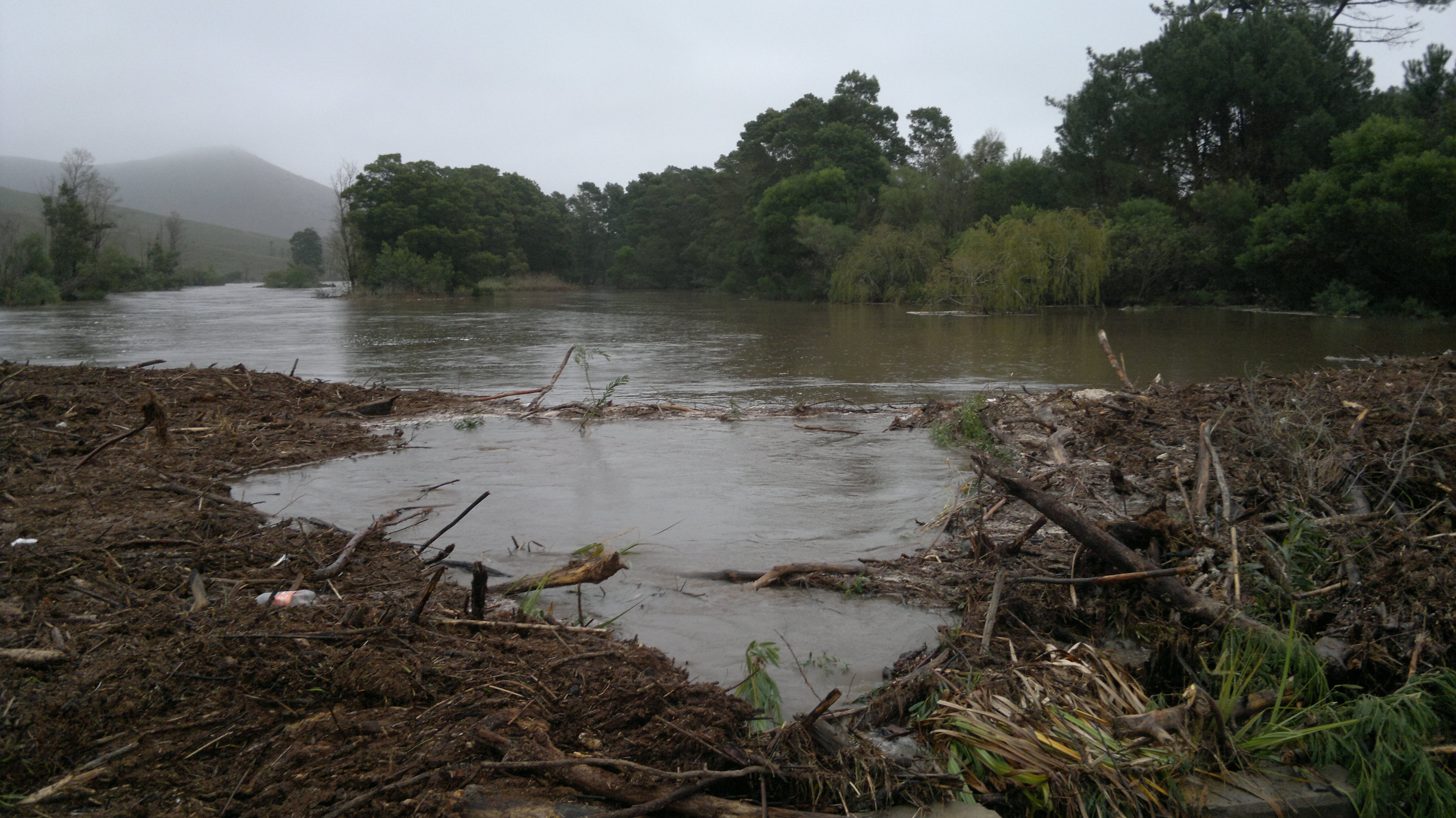
- The River in flood

- Etymology: Afrikaans/Dutch for "River without an end"

Location
- Country: South Africa
- Province: Western Cape

Physical characteristics
- Source
  - location: Near Villiersdorp
- Mouth: Breede River
  - location: Between Stormsvlei and Swellendam
  - coordinates: 34°4′14″S 20°17′7″E
  - elevation: 84 m (276 ft)
- Length: 115 km (71 mi)

The Sonderend River, also known as the Riviersonderend (Afrikaans for River without an end), is a main tributary of the Breede River, located in Western Cape Province, South Africa. The village of Riviersonderend is believed to have taken its name from the river.

== Naming ==
In 1673, Willem ten Rhyne referred to the river as "sine fine flumen" (Latin for "endless river"). In 1707, Jan Hatogh, a Dutch East India Company horticulturist, referred to the river as the "Kantdydnn", likely derived from the Hessequa "Kamma-kan Kamma", roughly "water, endless water" or "endless river". The Hessequa were a local tribe of Khoi-khoi herders.

== Dams in the River ==
- Theewaterskloof Dam

== See also ==
- List of reservoirs and dams in South Africa
