= Theewaterskloof Dam =

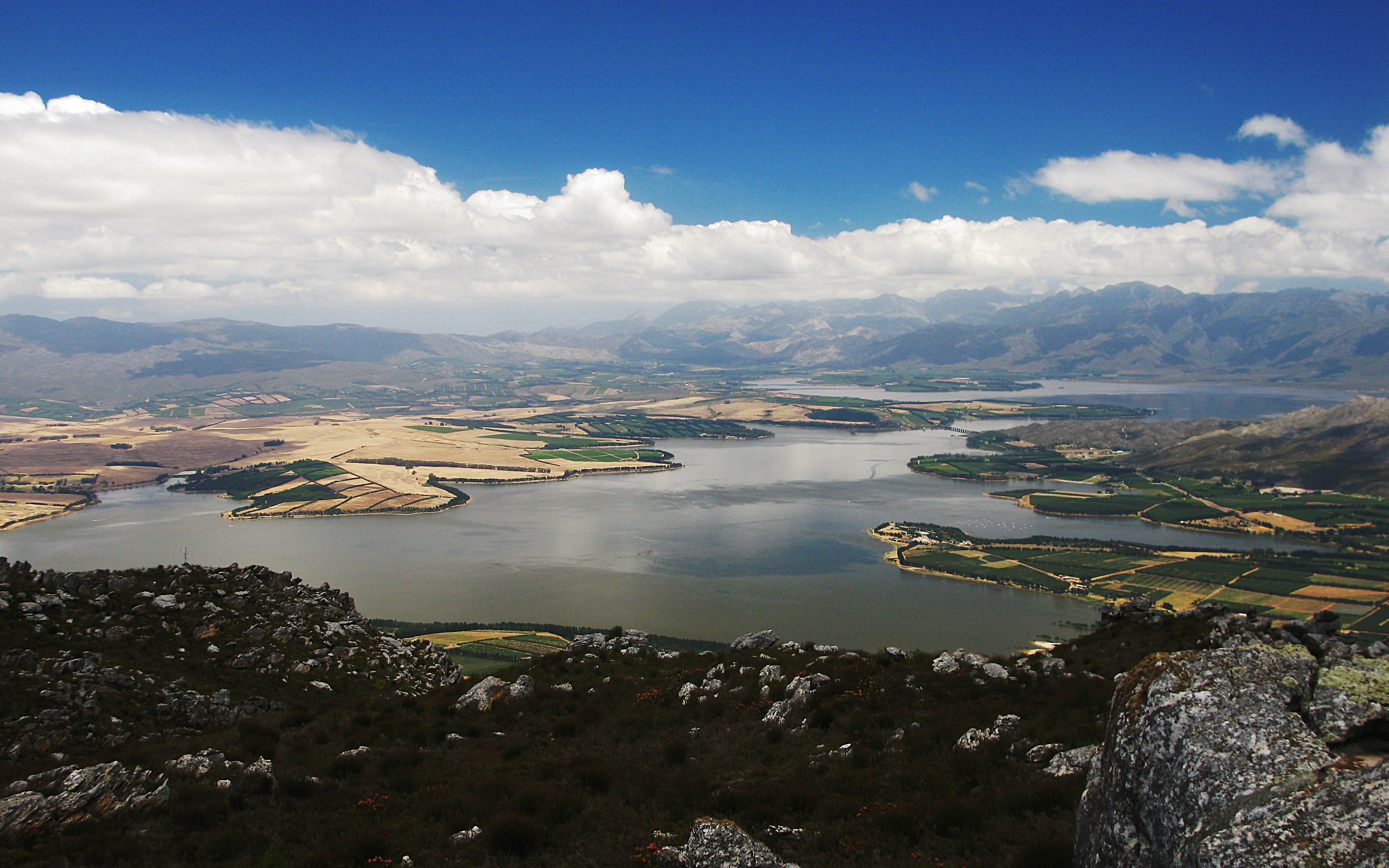
- View of Theewaterskloof reservoir from hills to the east

- Location in the Western Cape
- Location: Western Cape, South Africa
- Coordinates: 34°4′41″S 19°17′21″E
- Purpose: Irrigation and domestic
- Opening date: 1980
- Owner: Department of Water and Sanitation

Dam and spillways
- Type of dam: Earth fill dam
- Impounds: Sonderend River
- Height: 35 m (115 ft)
- Length: 646 m (2,119 ft)

Reservoir
- Creates: Theewaterskloof Dam Reservoir
- Total capacity: 480,406 Ml (16,965.4×10^{6} cu ft)
- Catchment area: 500 km^{2} (190 sq mi)
- Surface area: 5,059 ha (12,500 acres)

Theewaterskloof Dam is an earth-fill type dam located on the Sonderend River near Villiersdorp, Western Cape, South Africa. Administratively it is located within Theewaterskloof Local Municipality. It was established in 1978 and is the largest dam in the Western Cape Water Supply System with a capacity of 480 million cubic metres, about 41% of the water storage capacity available to Cape Town, which has a population of over 4 million people. The dam mainly serves for municipal and industrial use as well as for irrigation purposes. The hazard potential of the dam has been ranked high (3).

== Dam characteristics ==
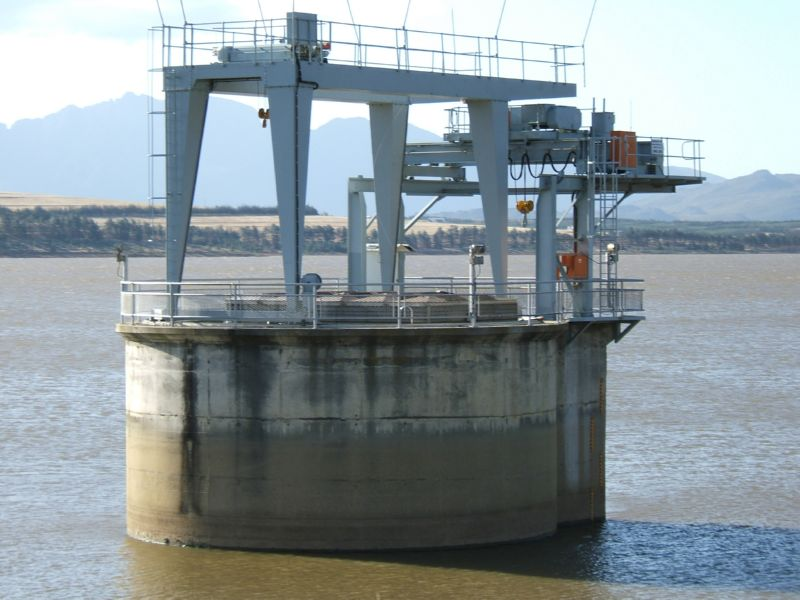

Theewaterskloof Dam's earth-fill wall is 646 metres (2,119 ft) long and 35 metres (115 ft) high. An inlet tower and conduit through the wall allow for releases of water into the Sonderend River. The spillway can handle a maximum flood of 394 cubic metres per second (13,900 cu ft/s). The Charmaine intake tower draws water from the reservoir into the Franschhoek Tunnel, which conveys it under the Franschhoek Mountains into the Berg River catchment and ultimately into Cape Town's water supply. In winter the tunnel can operate in reverse, conveying surplus water from the Berg River into Theewaterskloof. An additional intake tower supplies water to the Vyeboom Irrigation Board for irrigation of areas around the dam.

== Water restrictions ==
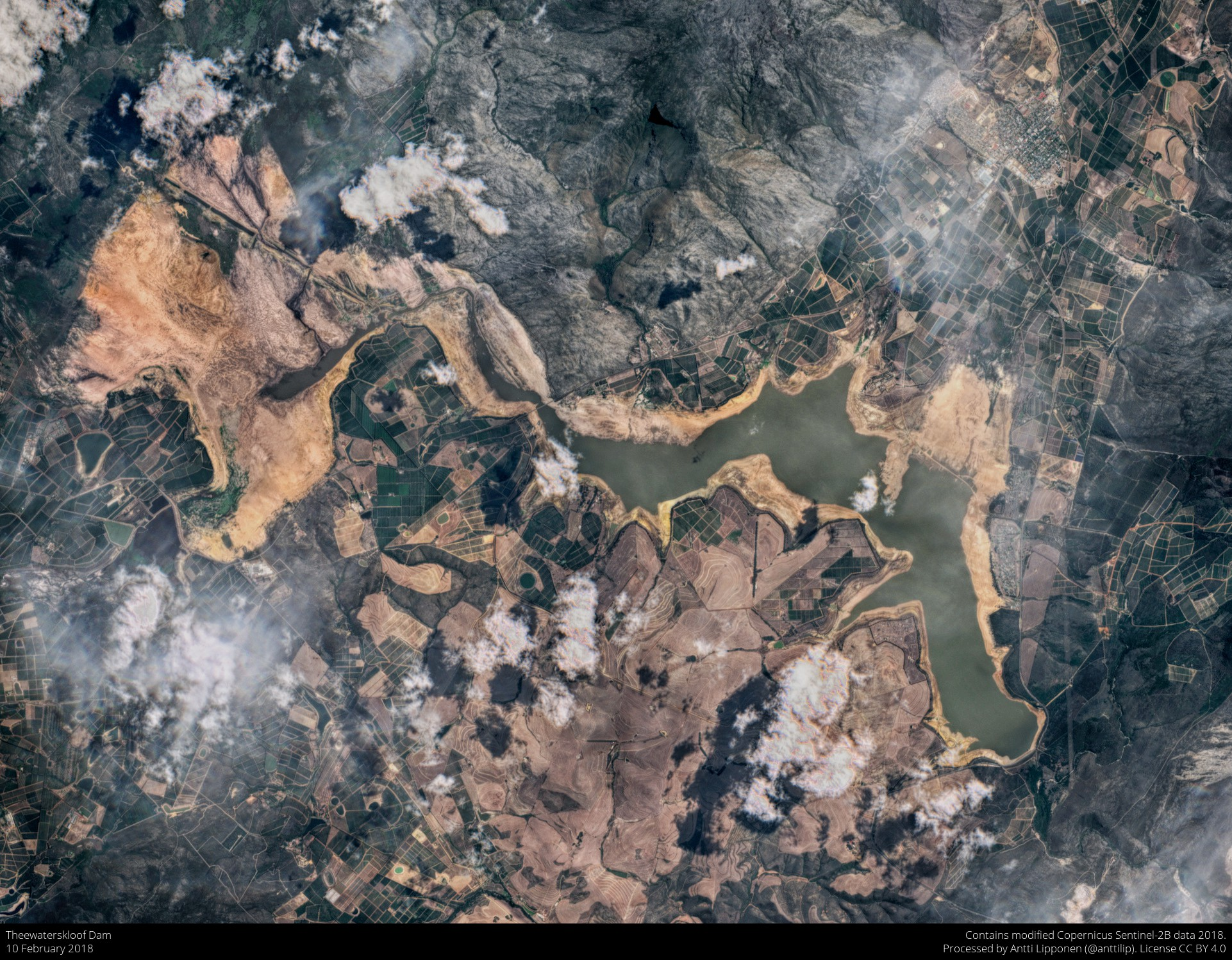
Theewaterskloof at approximately 12% capacity on 10 February 2018

Below-average rainfall since 2015 have seen the Theewaterskloof water level drop to critical levels. Water restrictions were imposed by the City of Cape Town in 2016 to meet a target of 600 million litres of water per day, with residents limited to 100 litres of water per day and a ban on car washing, watering gardens and topping up swimming pools with municipal water.

By the end of the 2017 dry season, Theewaterskloof had declined to a level of 12.9%, with the last 10% mostly unreachable. A storm in June 2017 brought heavy rain, increasing the level to 15%, but overall rainfall in 2017 remained very low. Media footage of the declining dam level sparked the importance of conserving water. Water restrictions in Cape Town were increased from Level 4 to Level 4b on 1 July 2017, limiting consumption to 87 litres of water per person per day. Rainfall in 2017 remained well below average, and by early 2018 the dam was again approaching critically low level, resulting in water consumption being limited to only 50 litres per person per day, and plans for a possible "Day Zero" in April 2018 when Cape Town's municipal water supply was predicted to be shut off.

As a result of good rains in the winters of 2019 and 2020, the Theewaterskloof water level reached 100% in October 2020.

== Rainfall and capacity ==
Theewaterskloof dam has a capacity of 480,406 megalitres (16,965.4×10^{6} cu ft) of water, and when full the reservoir covers an area of 5,059 hectares (12,500 acres). The catchment area of 500 square kilometres (190 sq mi) is served by streams emanating in the Hottentots Holland mountain range. This area has a long-term average of 69 days with precipitation per year. Historically records show we are in a dry period 1mm of rain per square meter equates to 500 000 000 litres falling on this area. Hence it requires a full metre of rainfall with 100% runoff to fill the dam from totally empty, which is unlikely to happen in any single year. It takes a few days for all the runoff to reach the dam. Evaporation and how saturated the ground is affects the amount of water reaching the dam. An average amount of between 9% and 15% is used to offset the values against evaporation and soil absorption. A deeper dam has less evaporation due to less surface area per volume.

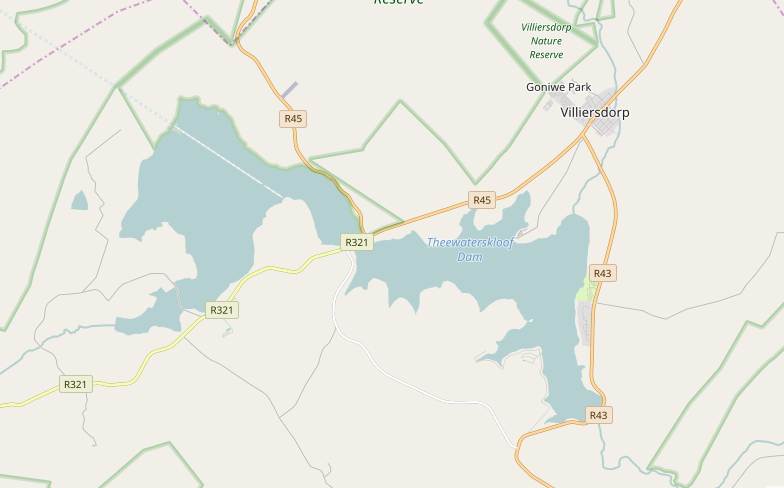
Location of the dam

Catchment area of the dam

== Social events ==
The Theewaterskloof Dam is also the home of the annual Synergy Live music festival, one of the biggest outdoor music festivals in South Africa, which typically takes place on the last weekend of November or the first weekend of December.

== See also ==
- List of reservoirs and dams in South Africa
