= Berg River Dam =

- An aerial view of the Berg River Dam

- Location within South Africa
- Official name: Berg River Dam
- Country: South Africa
- Location: Western Cape
- Coordinates: 33.90240°S 19.057000°E
- Purpose: Drinking water, storage
- Opening date: 2009
- Owner: Department of Water and Sanitation

Dam and spillways
- Type of dam: Embankment dam
- Impounds: Berg River
- Height: 68 metres (220 ft)
- Length: 929 metres (1,016 yd)

Reservoir
- Creates: Berg River Dam Reservoir
- Total capacity: 130,000 megalitres (130 hm^{3})
- Surface area: 4.88 square kilometres (1.88 mi^{2})

The Berg River Dam is a 68-metre (223 ft) high dam on the Berg River in South Africa. Situated between the towns of Franschhoek and Paarl, it is the centerpiece of the Berg Water Project (BWP) which is designed to capture the winter rainfall and store it for supply to Cape Town during the dry summer months.

The project in turn forms an important part of the Western Cape Water Supply System (WCWSS), an intricate system of dams and bulk water infrastructure that provides water to more than 3 million people. At the inauguration of the dam in 2009, then President of South Africa Kgalema Motlanthe called the project "a good example of how public infrastructure projects can be used to contribute meaningfully to poverty eradication and to foster social empowerment of the people."

The Berg River Dam was the first dam in South Africa to be designed and constructed in accordance with the guidelines of the World Commission on Dams. It has been completed on time and within budget. The Berg River basin and the adjacent metropolitan area of Cape Town are of particular importance to the Western Cape region because, although the basin generates only about 3% of the country's water resources, it is home to about 8% of South Africa's population, and produces about 12% of GDP.

The Berg River Dam (Autshumato Dam) was completed in 2007 at cost of R1.5 billion. It was designed and built in accordance with the United Nations World Commission on Dams, to provide water for Cape Town.

== Planning and construction ==
Planning for the Berg river dam began in 1989 by the South African Department of Water Affairs and Forestry. The process started with an analysis of future needs and water resources in the region, and was subjected to rigorous public participation process and debate.

In 1995/6, a comprehensive "Evaluation of Options" study was undertaken, a process in which more than 1,100 individuals and organisations took part. Extensive environmental and social impact studies were undertaken during 1996 and 1997 The Department of Environmental Affairs and Tourism approved the project in 1999.

In April 2002, the Cabinet approved the construction of the dam on condition that the City of Cape Town reduces the demand for water by 20% by 2020. Construction began in July 2004.

The dam started storing water in July 2007 and was full a year later thanks to good rainfall. According to the South African government, the decision to build the dam was taken only after an extensive review of the alternative options. It also involved an intensive public consultation process.

== Benefits ==
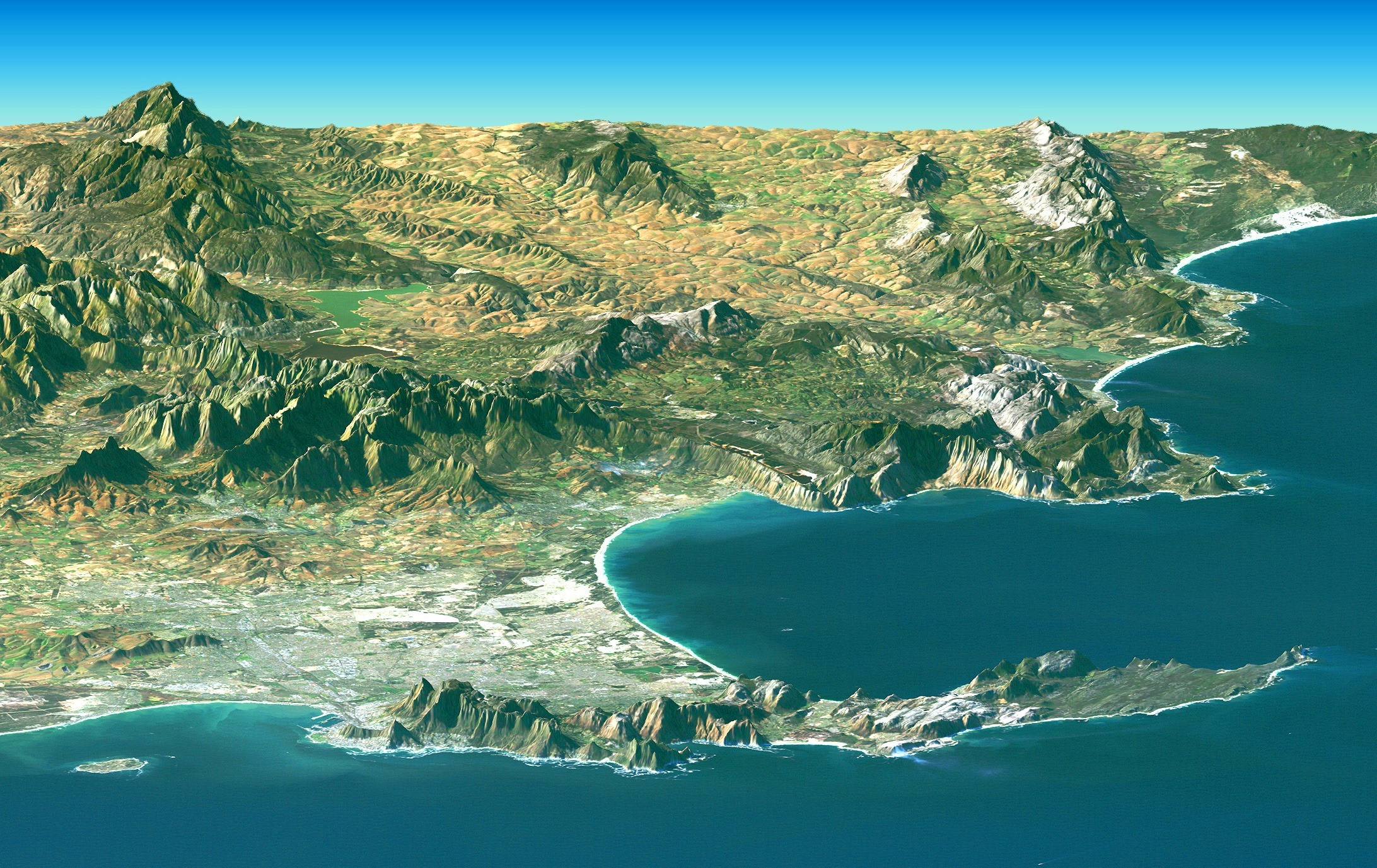
Cape Town, shown here based on a Landsat satellite picture in February 2000, will receive a greater and more reliable water supply through the Berg river dam. The reservoir shown in the background is formed by the Theewaterskloof Dam. The site of today's Berg river dam is in the valley to the left of the reservoir.

The dam will increase the water storage capacity to supply Cape Town, South Africa's second largest metropolitan area, from 768 to 898 million cubic metres (623,000 to 728,000 acre⋅ft). The scheme will also improve the reliability of water supplies in the drought-prone river basin. It is also expected that it will contribute to improve the naturally poor water quality in the lower reaches of the river.

== Environmental impact and its mitigation ==
The Berg River Dam was the first dam in South Africa to be designed, constructed and operated in accordance with the guidelines of the World Commission on Dams. According to the South African government this was confirmed by a 2001 a review of the project's processes. This is despite the fact that its planning phase preceded the World Commission on Dams, which was formed in 1997 and presented its report in 2000. The experience under the Berg River Dam thus influenced the work of the commission, not vice versa.

Indigenous plants have been planted on the downstream face of the dam wall, ensuring that the dam blends with the surrounding landscape. Parallel to the dam's construction alien vegetation was removed from the upper river catchment, significantly increasing the amount of water available for storage and for indigenous plant species. The scheme was designed to maintain the ecological integrity of the river, including through the release of specific volumes of water for this purpose.

The releases of low flows and high flows coincide as closely as possible with natural flows. The outlet works of the dam have been designed for a peak release of up to 200 m³ per second, making it the first dam in South Africa where provision is made for flood releases for environmental purposes.

An Environmental Management Plan (EMP) has been drawn up, on the basis of which an independent Environmental Control Officer (ECO) monitored and audited compliance by the dam's owner, the Trans-Caledon Tunnel Authority (TCTA), and all contractors. Achievements were documented in monthly reports and 6-monthly audits. Compliance was 82% in the first audit and 96% in the second audit. According to the project company, the independent ECO stated that there are no observable significant negative impacts associated with the project. Furthermore, a community-based and representative Environmental Monitoring Committee (EMC) has been created to ensure effective environmental management of the project.

Cape Town implemented a water conservation strategy aimed at reducing the use of water by using treated sewage effluent instead of fresh water for irrigation and industrial purposes. As a result of this strategy, and because people have become more aware of the value of water and are trying harder to conserve it, the council is experiencing a 25% saving.

== Adapting to climate change ==
It has been estimated that as a result of climate change, average runoff in the Berg river could decrease from a "reference scenario value" of 75.5 million cubic metres (61,200 acre⋅ft) per year to 58.9 million cubic metres (47,800 acre⋅ft) in 2030. It remains unclear how the above values relate to actual water use in the Berg system, which was 493 million cubic metres (400,000 acre⋅ft) in 2008. On the basis of a dynamic spatial equilibrium model for the Berg River, it has been estimated that the net present value of economic activities in the basin could be reduced by 11.5%. Without the Berg dam it would have been reduced by about 15%.

== Cost and financing ==
The Berg Water Project was initially estimated at R1,877m, which was reduced to R1,552 million (2006 estimate) after changes to the design of the dam. The Berg Water Project has been financed by loans from the Development Bank of Southern Africa (DBSA) (R500 million), the European Investment Bank (EIB) (R800 million) and Absa Group Limited (R300 million). In 2004 Fitch Ratings awarded the highest credit rating for a project of this kind, AA+. Debt was contracted by the TCTA.–

Cost recovery is through the sale of bulk water from TCTA to the Department of Water and Forestry, a government Ministry, which in turn sells the bulk water to the city of Cape Town. This arrangement reduces the financial risk, since the national government has a better credit rating than the city of Cape Town. The Western Cape population contributed towards the project in the form of an annual increase in water tariffs of 2.5% between 1999 and 2009.

== Technical characteristics ==
Map of the Berg River Dam and its catchment area

The concrete-faced rockfill dam is 68 metres (223 ft) high and 929 metres (3,048 ft) long. Its gross storage capacity is 130 million cubic metres (110,000 acre⋅ft) and the surface area of the reservoir is 488 hectares (1,210 acres). Downstream of the dam a "supplement scheme" diverts winter high flow, entering the Berg River from the Franschhoek, Wemmershoek and the Dwars River tributaries, to supplement water stored in the dam. Water from the scheme is pumped via the Drakenstein pump station, along a 9.5-kilometre (5.9 mi) pipeline, back up to the Berg River Dam.

== Awards ==
The Berg Water Project has received the following awards:

- the Consulting Engineers South Africa's Glenrand MIB Award for Engineering Excellence
- the International Association for Environmental Impact Assessment South Africa's Award for Excellence in Environmental Management in Project Execution
- the South African Institute of Civil Engineering Technical Excellence Award
- Construction World Best Project 2008 public/private partnership.

== See also ==
- List of reservoirs and dams in South Africa
