= Breede Water Management Area =

Breede WMA, or Breede Water Management Area (coded: 18), Includes the following major rivers: the Breede River, Riviersonderend River, Sout River, Bot River and Palmiet River, and covers the following Dams:

- Brandvlei Dam Lower Brandvlei River
- Buffeljags Dam Buffeljags River
- Eikenhof Dam Palmiet River
- Elandskloof Dam Elands River
- Keerom Dam Nuy River
- Klipberg Dam Konings River
- Kwaggaskloof Dam Doorn River
- Lakenvallei Dam Sanddrifskloof River
- Pietersfontein Dam Pietersfontein River
- Poortjieskloof Dam Groot River
- Roode Els Berg Dam Sanddrifskloof River
- Stettynskloof Dam Holsloot River
- Teewaterskloof Dam Sonderend River

== Boundaries ==
Tertiary drainage regions G40 (excluding quaternary catchment G40A), G50, and H10 to H70.

== See also ==
- Water Management Areas
- List of reservoirs and dams in South Africa
- List of rivers of South Africa
