= Breede River =

River in South Africa

Breede Breë
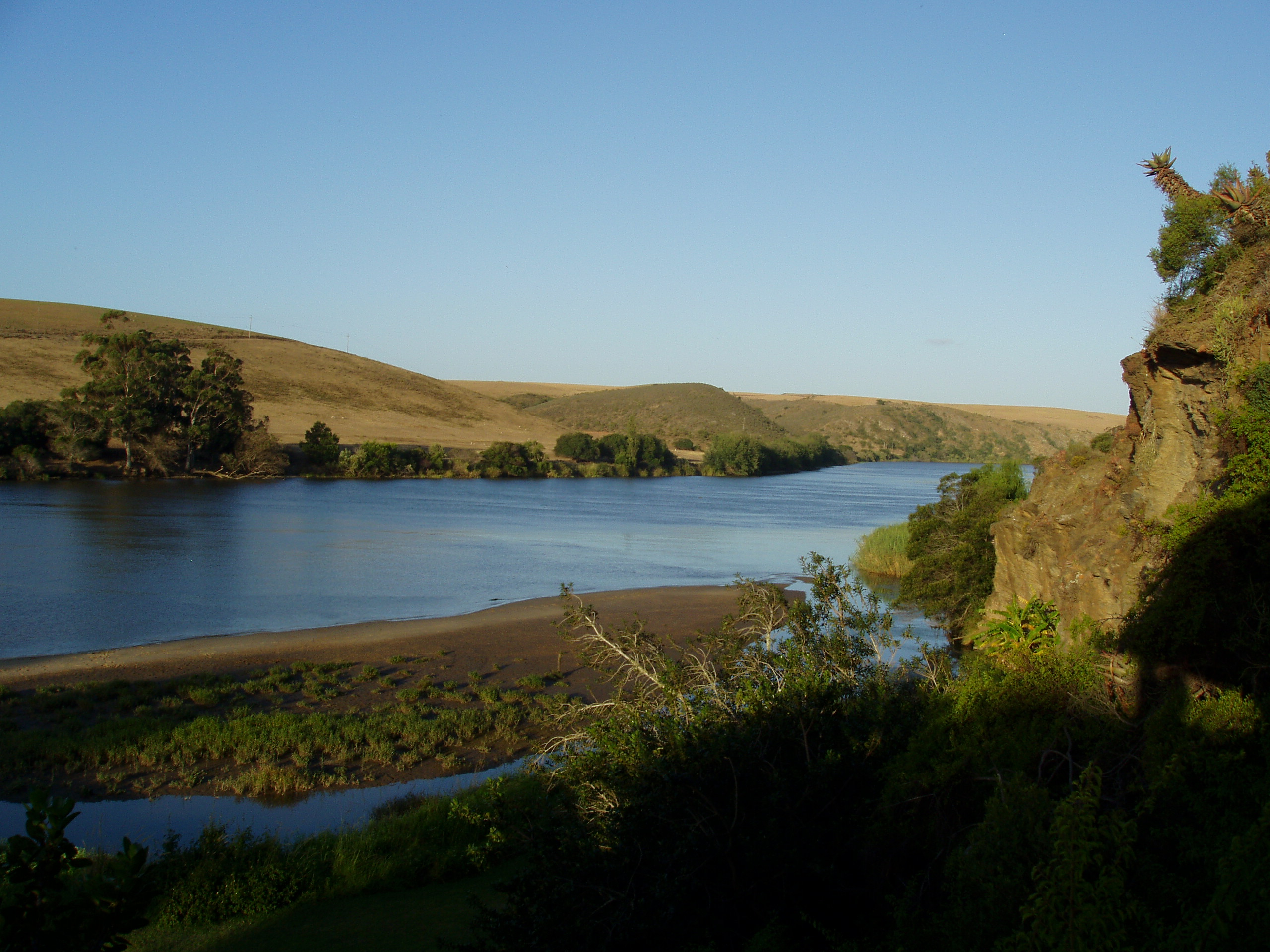
- The Breede River about 5km inland from its mouth.

- Location of the Breede River mouth
- Etymology: Dutch for "wide" or "broad".

Location
- Country: South Africa
- Region: Western Cape Province

Physical characteristics
- Source: North of the Swartberg
- Mouth: Witsand
  - location: Indian Ocean
  - coordinates: 34°24′S 20°50′E
- Length: 337 km (209 mi)
- Basin size: 12,384 km^{2} (4,781 sq mi)

The Breede River (Afrikaans: Breederivier), also known as Breë River, is a river in the Western Cape Province of South Africa. Travelling inland north from the city of Cape Town, the river runs in a west to east direction. The surrounding western mountains formed the first continental divide experienced by European settlers in the 18th century. The Witels River and Dwars River become the Breë River.

== Sources ==
The first catchment area of the river is in the Skurweberg mountain range close to Ceres. The head waters then runs through the modern day Michell's Pass before plaining out on its middle course in the Worcester area. The river mouth is in an estuary at Witsand on the Indian Ocean.

== Tributaries ==
On its course through the Breede River Valley, it is joined by the Holsloot and Smalblaar Rivers, from their catchment areas, the Du Toitskloof and Stettyn mountain ranges. The Hex River with its catchment area in the Hex River Mountains also joins the Breede River from the north-east. Further downstream the Slang River and Buffeljags River drain the southern slopes of the Langeberg mountains before depositing their water in the Breede River. Near Swellendam the river is joined by the Riviersonderend, with its catchment area in the mountains surrounding the Theewaterskloof Dam near Villiersdorp.

== Dams on the river ==
The Greater Brandvlei Dam, completed in 1936 and fully extended by 1987, provides water to various irrigation schemes throughout the agricultural sector of the region. (also known as the Brandvlei Dam and the Kwaggaskloof Dam. In the catchment area are a few more dams:

- Stettynskloof Dam on the Holsloot River tributary of the Breede River.
- Zwiegelaars Dam
- Theewaterskloof Dam both on the Riviersonderend River
- Elandskloof Dam on the Elands River a tributary of the Riviersonderend River.
- Moordkuil Dam on the Hooks River a tributary of the Breede River.
- Keerom Dam on the Nuy River a tributary of the Breede River.
- Klipberg Dam on the Konings River itself a tributary of the Keisers River, a tributary of the Breede River.
- Pietersfontein Dam on the Pietersfontein River a tributary of the Kogmanskloof River, again a tributary of the Breede River.
- Poortjieskloof Dam on the Groot River also flowing into the Kogmanskloof River
- Buffeljags Dam on the Buffeljags River a tributary of the Breede River.

== Activities ==
The Breede River is a popular location for river rafting tours. The gently flowing water and the absence of crocodiles, hippos and mosquitoes make this a popular weekend destination. Several tour operators launch about 20 km south of Swellendam in two-man blow-up boats. The river is navigable for about 28 km, from the mouth at Witsand.

== Ecology ==
Frequently, bull sharks enter the estuary and dwell in the waters of the Breede River, having been recorded as much as 5 km upriver. These sharks were featured on the second season of the series River Monsters. As Jeremy Wade's investigations indicate, the bull sharks of the Breede River are larger than average due to their unique habit of stealing fishermen's catches, allowing them to feed and gain weight without expending much energy. This and the healthy nature of the river's ecosystem in turn has led to a record of very few to no shark attacks on humans in the area.

== Gallery ==
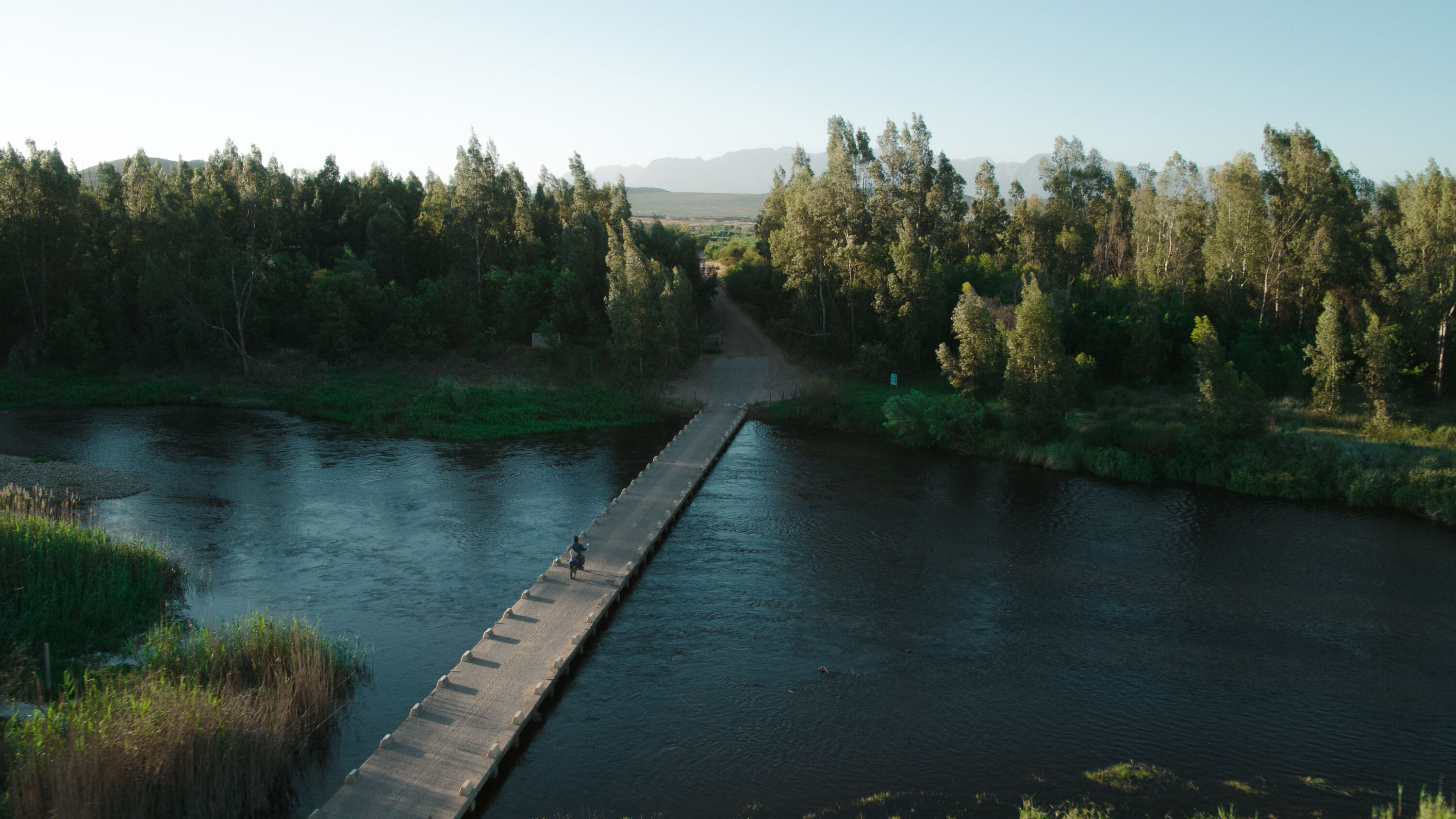
Alvi's Drift low-water bridge across the Breede River

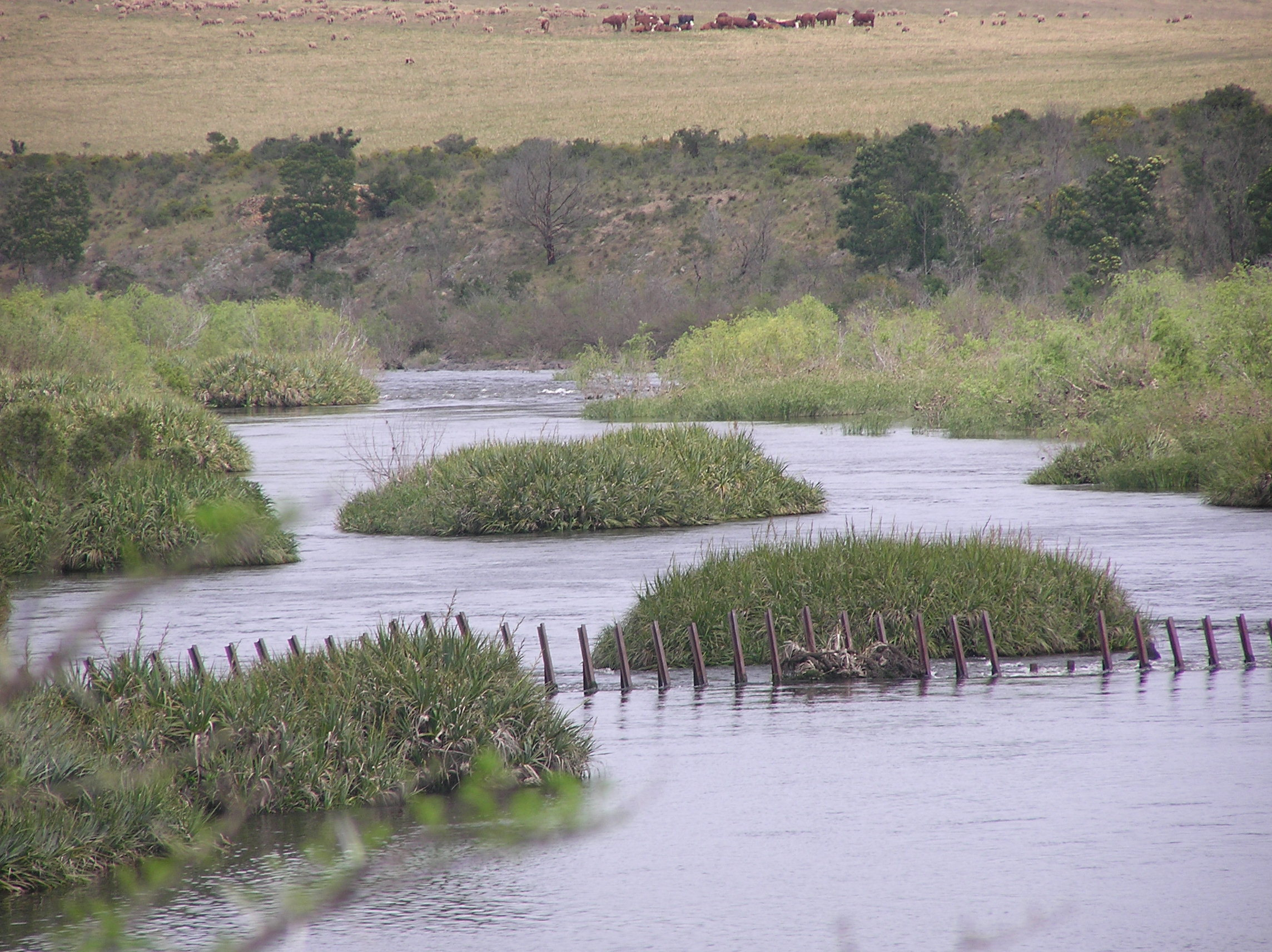
Breede from Bontebok Park

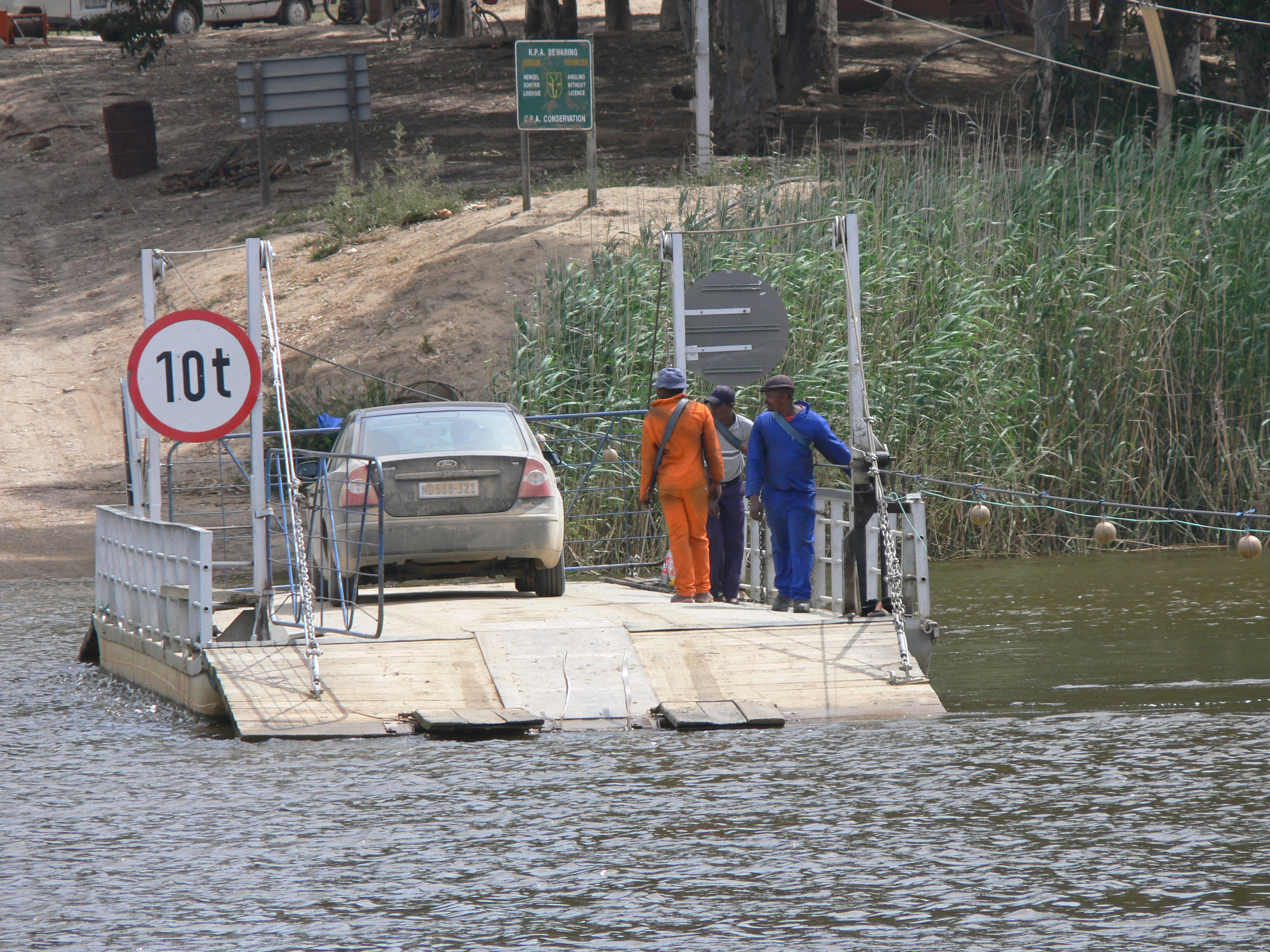
Cable ferry at Malgas

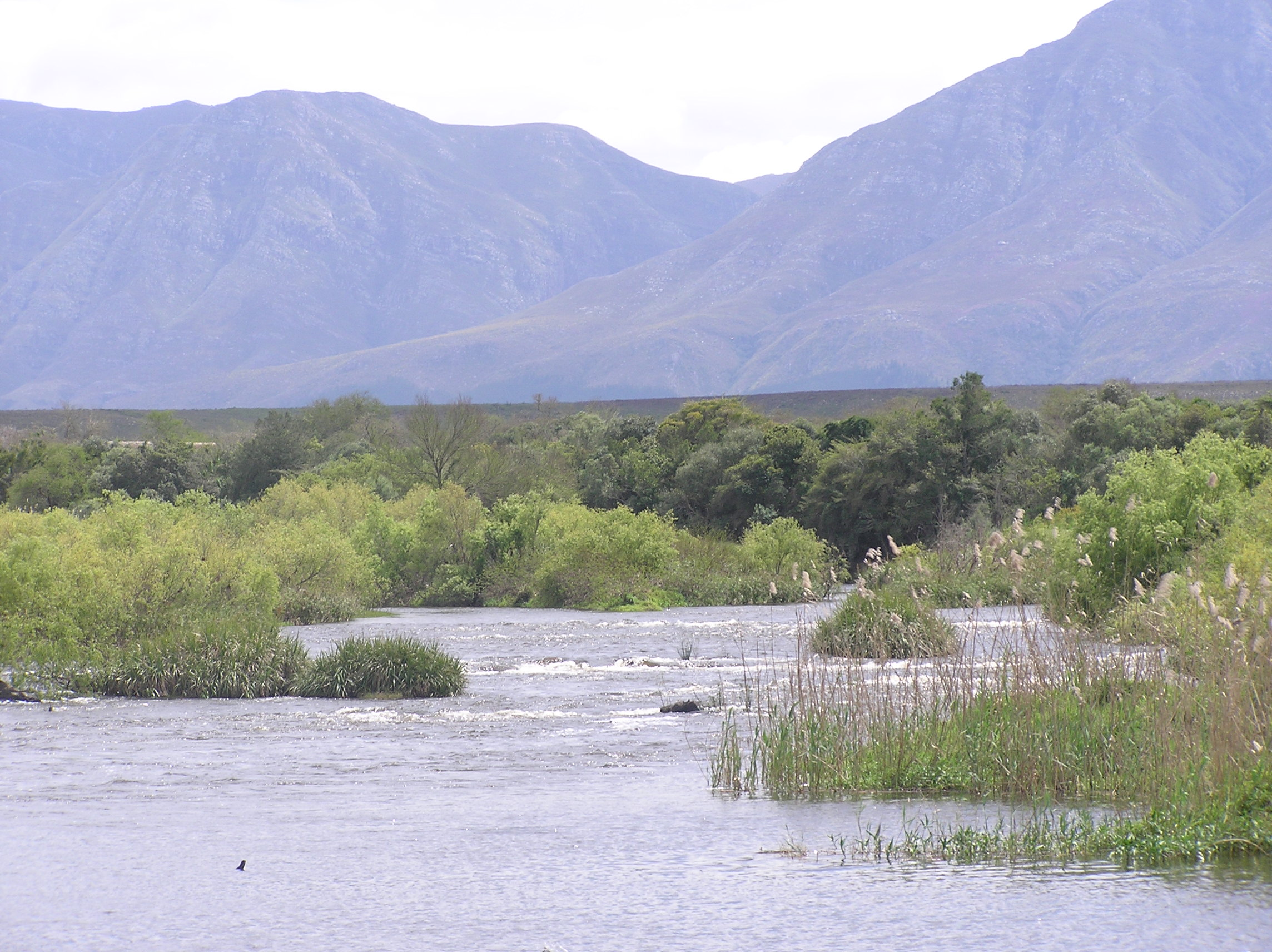
Breede with Langeberg backdrop

== See also ==
- List of rivers of South Africa
- Skurweberg Pass
