= Upper Orange Water Management Area =

Upper Orange WMA, or Upper Orange Water Management Area (coded: 13), Includes the following major rivers: the Modder River, Riet River, Caledon River and Orange River, and covers the following Dams:

- Armenia Dam Leeu River
- Egmont Dam Witspruit
- Gariep Dam Orange River
- Groothoek Dam Kgabanyane River
- Kalkfontein Dam Riet River
- Katse Dam Malibamatso River
- Knellpoort Dam Rietspruit
- Krugersdrift Dam Modder River
- Mohale Dam Senqunyane River
- Rustfontein Dam Modder River
- Tierpoort Dam Tierpoort River
- Vanderkloof Dam Orange River
- Welbedacht Dam Caledon River

== Boundaries ==
Tertiary drainage regions C51, C52, D11 to D18, D21 to D24, D31, D32, D34 and D35.

== See also ==
- Water Management Areas
- List of reservoirs and dams in South Africa
- List of rivers of South Africa
