= Usutu to Mhlatuze Water Management Area =

South African water management area

Usutu to Mhlatuze WMA, or Usutu to Mhlatuze Water Management Area (coded: 6), in South Africa includes the following major rivers: the Usutu River, Pongola River, Mhlatuze River, Mfolozi River and Mkuze River, and covers the following Dams:

- Goedertrouw Dam Mhlatuze River
- Heyshope Dam Assegaai River
- Hluhluwe Dam Hluhluwe River
- Jericho Dam Mpama River
- Klipfontein Dam Wit Mfolozi River
- Morgenstond Dam Ngwempisi River
- Pongolapoort Dam Phongolo River
- Westoe Dam Usutu River

== Boundaries ==
Primary drainage region W.
