= Lower Vaal Water Management Area =

Lower Vaal WMA, or Lower Vaal Water Management Area (coded: 10), includes the following major rivers: the Harts River, Molopo River and Vaal River, and covers the following Dams:

- Spitskop Dam - Harts River
- Vaalharts Storage Weir - Vaal River

== Boundaries ==
Tertiary drainage regions C31 to C33, C91, C92 (excluding quaternary catchment C92C), D41 (excluding quaternary catchment D41A), and quaternary catchments D73A and portions of D42C, D42D, D73B, D73C, D73D and D73E. The western boundary of this area runs from the confluence of the Kuruman River with the Molopo River along the watershed between quaternary catchments D42C and D42D until it meets the boundary of the Kalahari East Water Board. The Water Management Area boundary then follows this Water Board boundary to a point, west of the Langberge, 19 kilometres west of Beeshoek, near Postmasburg. The Water Management Area boundary then runs South East to meet the watershed between quaternary catchments D73A and D73B. The boundary then follows this watershed, and that between D73A and D71B, until it meets the watershed of tertiary catchment C92.

== See also ==
- List of dams and reservoirs in South Africa
