= Greater Brandvlei Dam =

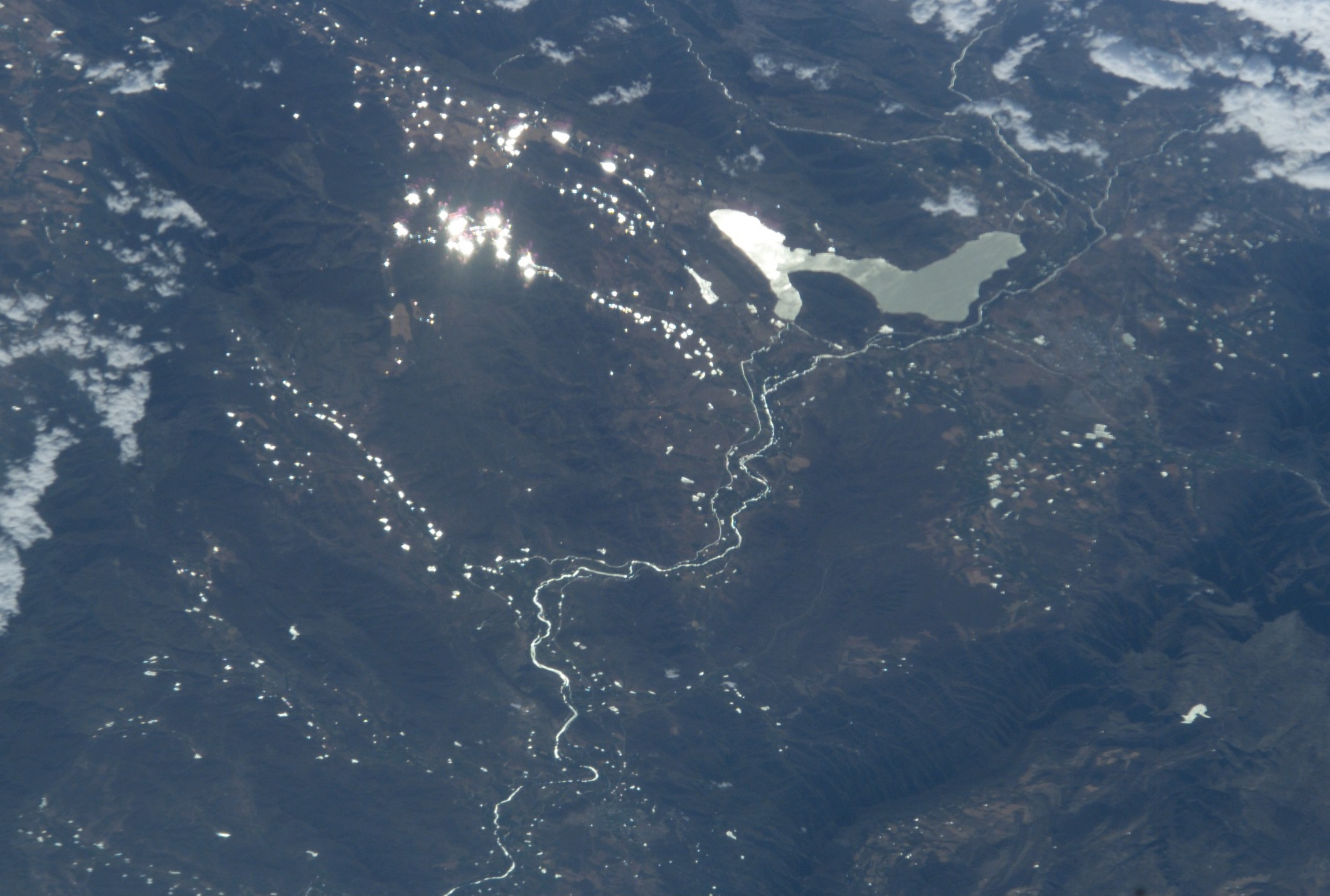
- A view of the reservoir and Breede River, as seen from space in December 2002
- Interactive map of Greater Brandvlei Dam
- Official name: Greater Brandvlei Dam
- Location: Western Cape, South Africa
- Coordinates: 33°42′1″S 19°27′46″E
- Opening date: 1983
- Operators: Department of Water Affairs and Forestry

Dam and spillways
- Type of dam: earth-fill
- Impounds: Breede River
- Height: 21.5 m
- Length: 1250 m

Reservoir
- Creates: Greater Brandvlei Dam Reservoir
- Total capacity: 459 000 000 m³
- Catchment area: 64 km^{2}
- Surface area: 4110 ha

Greater Brandvlei Dam is an earth-fill type dam located on a tributary of the Breede River, near Worcester, Western Cape, South Africa. It was formed by joining the original Brandvlei Dam (Lake Marais) and the Kwaggaskloof Dam after reconstruction in 1989. Its main purpose is for irrigation use and the hazard potential of the dam has been ranked high (3).

== See also ==
- List of reservoirs and dams in South Africa
- List of rivers of South Africa
