= De Beer's Pass =

De Beer's Pass can refer to one of two mountain passes in South Africa:

- In the Eastern Cape, on an unmarked road between Cookhouse and Tarkastad
- In KwaZulu-Natal, on an unmarked road between Ladysmith and Harrismith
