= Buffelspoort Dam =

- Interactive map of Buffelspoort Dam
- Official name: Buffelspoort Dam
- Country: South Africa
- Location: Near Rustenburg, North West
- Coordinates: 25°46′50″S 27°29′1″E
- Purpose: Irrigation
- Opening date: 1937
- Owner: Department of Water Affairs

Dam and spillways
- Type of dam: Arch dam
- Impounds: Sterkstroom River
- Height: 34.7 m
- Length: 168 m

Reservoir
- Creates: Buffelspoort Dam Reservoir
- Total capacity: 10 251 000 m³
- Surface area: 135.7 ha

Buffelspoort Dam is an arch type dam in the Sterkstroom River, a tributary of the Crocodile River in the North West Province of South Africa. Its main purpose is for irrigation use and it is owned by the Department of Water Affairs.

It is located on the northern slopes of Magaliesberg mountain range, 27 km southeast of Rustenburg. This dam is a popular fishing spot.

== See also ==
- List of reservoirs and dams in South Africa
- List of rivers of South Africa
- List of mountain ranges of South Africa
