= Alphen Dam =

- Interactive map of Alphen Dam
- Official name: Alphen Dam
- Country: South Africa
- Location: near Stellenbosch, Western Cape
- Coordinates: 34°00′42″S 18°52′25″E
- Opening date: 1990; 35 years ago
- Owner: Department of Water Affairs

Dam and spillways
- Impounds: Bonte River
- Height: 21 m (69 ft)
- Length: 122 m (400 ft)

Reservoir
- Creates: Alphen Dam Reservoir

Alphen Dam is a small dam in the Bonte River near Stellenbosch, Western Cape province of South Africa. It was established in 1990.

== See also ==
- List of reservoirs and dams in South Africa
- List of rivers of South Africa
