= Bospoort Dam =

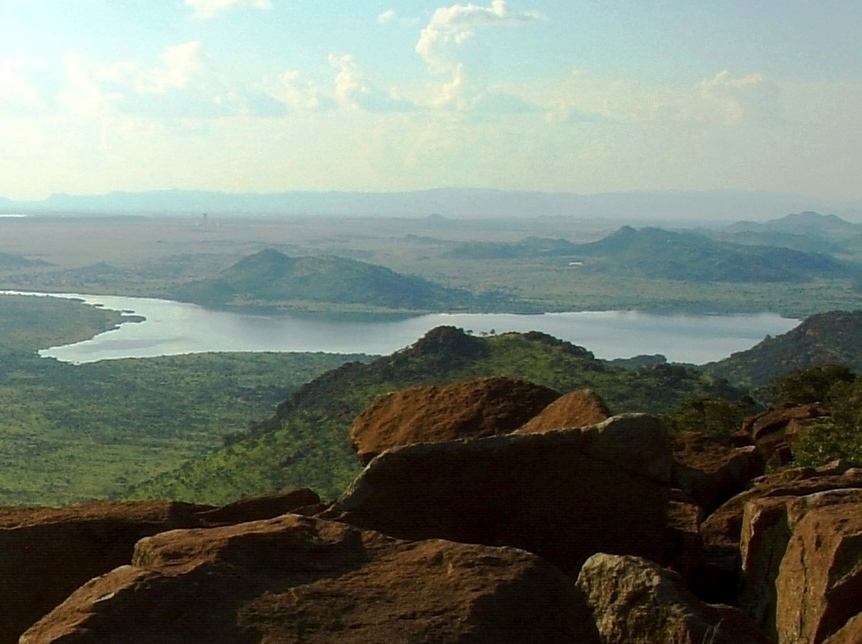

- Location within South Africa Location within North West (South African province)
- Official name: Bospoort Dam
- Country: South Africa
- Location: North West
- Coordinates: 25°33′45″S 27°21′14″E
- Purpose: Irrigation
- Opening date: 1933; 93 years ago
- Owner: Department of Water Affairs

Dam and spillways
- Type of dam: Combination gravity and earth fill dam
- Impounds: Hex River
- Height: 23 m (75 ft)
- Length: 468 m (1,535 ft)

Reservoir
- Creates: Bospoort Dam Reservoir
- Total capacity: 18.2×10^{6} m^{3} (640×10^{6} cu ft)
- Surface area: 378.8 ha (936 acres)

Bospoort Dam is a gravity/earth-fill type dam on the Hex River, a tributary of the Elands River, part of the Crocodile River (Limpopo) basin. It is located near Rustenburg, North West, South Africa. Its primary purpose is for irrigation.

== History ==
It was established in 1933. It was originally the main water supply for the town of Rustenburg. In the sixties it was no longer used for drinking water due to contamination from platinum and chrome mines in the region. Due to water shortages in the nineties it was again used as the main water source for the Boitekong and surrounding townships. The fish in the dam are not fit for human consumption. The water in the dam is so corrosive that the steel sluices had to be replaced by a major rebuilding project in 2009 and 2010 for fear of the dam wall collapsing in a flood. The new dam structure was built from corrosion resistant compounds.

== See also ==
- List of reservoirs and dams in South Africa
- List of rivers of South Africa
