= Madikwe Dam =

- Interactive map of Madikwe Dam
- Official name: Madikwe Dam
- Location: North West, South Africa
- Coordinates: 25°23′6″S 26°35′1″E
- Opening date: 1976
- Operators: Department of Water Affairs and Forestry

Dam and spillways
- Type of dam: earth-fill
- Impounds: Tholwane River
- Height: 17 metres (56 ft)
- Length: 1,820 metres (5,970 ft)

Reservoir
- Creates: Madikwe Dam Reservoir
- Total capacity: 14,000,000 cubic metres (490,000,000 cu ft)
- Catchment area: 305 km^{2}
- Surface area: 431 hectares (1,070 acres)

Madikwe Dam is an earth-fill type dam located on the Tholwane River, near Madikwe, North West, South Africa. It was established in 1976 and the dams primary purpose is to serve for municipal and industrial use. The hazard potential of the dam has been ranked high (3).

== See also ==
- List of reservoirs and dams in South Africa
- List of rivers of South Africa
