= Craigie Burn Dam =

- Interactive map of Craigie Burn Dam
- Official name: Craigie Burn Dam
- Country: South Africa
- Location: near Greytown, KwaZulu-Natal
- Coordinates: 29°9′47″S 30°17′2″E
- Purpose: Irrigation
- Opening date: 1963
- Owner: Department of Water Affairs

Dam and spillways
- Type of dam: arch, earth-fill
- Impounds: Mnyamvubu River
- Height: 39.9 m
- Length: 262 m

Reservoir
- Creates: Craigie Burn Dam Reservoir
- Total capacity: 23 070 000 m³
- Surface area: 207.3 ha

Craigie Burn Dam is an arch/earth-fill type dam located on the Mnyamvubu River, near Greytown, KwaZulu-Natal, South Africa. It was established in 1963 and its primary purpose is for irrigation usage. Recent assessments however, assign a significant hazard potential to the dam/reservoir which in turn makes the intended use questionable.

== See also ==
- List of reservoirs and dams in South Africa
- List of rivers of South Africa
