= Klipdrif Dam =

- Interactive map of Klipdrif Dam
- Official name: Klipdrif Dam
- Country: South Africa
- Location: near Potchefstroom, North West
- Coordinates: 26°36′32″S 27°18′41″E
- Purpose: Irrigation
- Opening date: 1990
- Owner: Department of Water Affairs

Dam and spillways
- Type of dam: Earth fill dam
- Impounds: Loopspruit
- Height: 12m
- Length: 190 m

Reservoir
- Creates: Klipdrif Dam Reservoir
- Total capacity: 3 100 000 m^{3}
- Surface area: 440 ha
- Maximum water depth: 5m

Klipdrif Dam is an earth-fill type dam located on the Loopspruit and Enselspruit near Potchefstroom, North West, South Africa. The river flowing out the dam is the Loopspruit. It was established in 1990 and its primary purpose is to serve for irrigation. The hazard potential of the dam has been ranked significant (2).

== Fauna ==
The reservoir contains a healthy population of Common Carp (Cyprinus carpio) as well as Sharptooth Catfish (Clarias gariepinus), Orange River Mudfish (Labeo capensis), Moggel (Labeo umbratus), Smallmouth Yellowfish (Labeobarbus aeneus), Largemouth Bass (Micropterus dolomieu), Banded Tilapia (Tilapia sparrmanii), Threespot Barb ( Enteromius trimaculatus), Chubbyhead Barb (Enteromius anoplus), Straightfin Barb (Enteromius paulindnosus), Southern Mouthbrooder (Pseudocrenilabrus philander), Rock Catfish (Austroglanis sclateri) and Western Mosquitofish (Gumbisa affinis).

There is a healthy bird population around the dam with birds such as African Fish Eagle, Greater and Lesser Flamingo, Egyptian Goose, Red-knobbed coot, Moorhen, White-faced Whistling Duck, African Black Duck, Cape and Red-billed Teal, Southern Pochard, Yellow-billed Duck, Yellow-billed Stork, Abdim's Stork, White Stork, Grey Heron, Goliath Heron, Purple Heron, Black-headed Heron, Black-crowned Night Heron, African Spoonbill, Pied Kingfisher, Malachite Kingfisher, Giant Kingfisher, Helmet Guineafowl, Osprey, Grey-headed Gull and various Terns, Coursers, Plovers and Wagtails residing in and around the reservoir.

Other animals residing in and around the dam include Cape Clawless Otter, Blesbok, Grey Rhebok, Common Duiker, Steenbok, Warthog, Black-backed Jackal, Cape Fox, Aardwolf, African Wild Cat, Caracal, Porcupine, Aardvark, Southern Hedgehog, Cape Pangolin, Honey Badger, Cape and Scrub Hare, Springhare as well as feral cats and dogs. Reptiles include Nile and Rock Monitor Lizards, African Rock Python, Puffadder, Rinkhals and Leopard Tortoise. African Bullfrog can also be found around the dam.

== Flora ==
The vegetation around the dam is typical Highveld Grassland used for cattle grazing. There are scattered reed beds (Phragmites spp.) along the reservoir, with thick reed beds (Phragmites spp.) along the banks near the inlet. The reservoir contains thick beds of algae sludge and also blue floating algae.

== Uses ==
=== Angling ===
The dam is popular amongst recreational anglers, with competitions being hosted along the banks each year.

Fishing Records from the dam
Species	Common name	Size	Year
Cyprinus Carpio	Common Carp	13.4 kg	2012
Clarias Gariepinus	Sharptooth Catfish	30.2 kg	2013
Labeo Capensis	Orange River Mudfish	2.1 kg	2001
Labeobarbus Aeneus	Smallmouth Yellowfish	4.1 kg	1999
Micropterus Dolomieu	Largemouth Bass	3.6 kg	2017

=== Irrigation ===
The dams main purpose was to provide water for irrigation for farm lands downstream from the dam.

=== Water Sports ===
Boating, water skiing and canoeing are all popular at the dam.

== See also ==
- List of reservoirs and dams in South Africa
- List of rivers of South Africa
