= Spring Grove Dam =

Dam in KwaZulu-Natal, South Africa

- Interactive map of Spring Grove Dam
- Official name: Spring Grove
- Country: South Africa
- Location: Approximately 5 kilometres (3.1 mi) North West of Nottingham Road in the KwaZulu-Natal province.
- Coordinates: 29.32°S 29.97°E
- Purpose: Municipal and industrial use
- Opening date: 2013
- Owner: Department of Water Affairs

Dam and spillways
- Impounds: Mooi River
- Height: 37 m (121 ft)
- Length: 607 m (1,991 ft)

Reservoir
- Creates: Spring Grove Dam Reservoir
- Total capacity: 139,500,000 m^{3} (4.93×10^{9} cu ft)
- Catchment area: 344 km^{2} (133 sq mi)
- Surface area: 1,022 ha (2,530 acres)

Spring Grove Dam is an roller compacted concrete (RCC) dam with an earth embankment located on the Mooi River in the KwaZulu-Natal north west of the town of Nottingham Road in South Africa. Construction commenced in 2011 and was officially opened on 19 November 2013. It has a full capacity of 139,500,000 cubic metres (4.93×10^{9} cu ft) of water and serves primarily for Municipal and industrial use.

== See also ==
- List of reservoirs and dams in South Africa
