= Jericho Dam =

- Interactive map of Jericho Dam
- Official name: Jericho Dam
- Country: South Africa
- Location: Amsterdam, Mpumalanga
- Coordinates: 26°39′15″S 30°29′10″E
- Purpose: Industrial and domestic
- Opening date: 1966/68
- Operator: Department of Water Affairs

Dam and spillways
- Type of dam: Combination gravity and earth fill dam
- Impounds: Mpama River
- Height: 21.3 m
- Length: 1 167.8 m

Reservoir
- Creates: Jericho Dam Reservoir
- Total capacity: 59 300 000 m^{3}
- Catchment area: 218 km^{2}
- Surface area: 982.5 ha

Jericho Dam is a combined concrete gravity and earth-fill type dam on the Mpama River, near Amsterdam, Mpumalanga, South Africa. It became operational from 1966 though to 1968 and its primary purpose is to serve for municipal and industrial use.

== See also ==
- List of reservoirs and dams in South Africa
- List of rivers of South Africa
