= Lubisi Dam =

- Interactive map of Lubisi Dam
- Official name: Lubisi Dam
- Country: South Africa
- Location: Qamata, Eastern Cape
- Coordinates: 31°47′45″S 27°25′0″E
- Purpose: Irrigation
- Opening date: 1968
- Owner: Department of Water Affairs

Dam and spillways
- Type of dam: Arch dam
- Impounds: Indwe River
- Height: 51 metres (167 ft)
- Length: 236 metres (774 ft)

Reservoir
- Creates: Lubisi Dam Reservoir
- Total capacity: 158,200 cubic metres (5,590,000 cu ft)
- Catchment area: 1,255 square kilometres (485 sq mi)
- Surface area: 1,115 hectares (2,760 acres)

Lubisi Dam is an arch type dam located on the Indwe River, near Qamata, Eastern Cape, South Africa. It was established in 1968 and it serves mainly for irrigation purposes. The hazard potential of the dam has been ranked high (3).

== See also ==
- List of reservoirs and dams in South Africa
- List of rivers of South Africa
