= Xilinxa Dam =

- Interactive map of Xilinxa Dam
- Official name: Xilinxa Dam
- Country: South Africa
- Location: Idutywa, Eastern Cape
- Coordinates: 32°07′47.5″S 28°04′48.7″E
- Purpose: Irrigation
- Owner: Department of Water Affairs

Dam and spillways
- Type of dam: Earth fill dam
- Impounds: Xilinxa River

Reservoir
- Creates: Xilinxa Dam Reservoir

Xilinxa Dam is a dam on the Xilinxa River, lying between Nqamakwe and Idutywa in the Eastern Cape, South Africa.

== See also ==
- List of reservoirs and dams in South Africa
- List of rivers of South Africa
