= Babiana arenicola =

Scientific classification
- Kingdom: Plantae
- Clade: Tracheophytes
- Clade: Angiosperms
- Clade: Monocots
- Order: Asparagales
- Family: Iridaceae
- Genus: Babiana
- Species: B. arenicola

Binomial name
- Babiana arenicola Goldblatt & J.C.Manning

Species of flowering plant

Babiana arenicola is a perennial, geophytic flowering plant in the family Iridaceae. It is part of the fynbos ecoregion. The species is endemic to the Western Cape. It occurs near Worcester, at the Greater Brandvlei Dam, there are two subpopulations. The planting of vineyards is a threat to the species.
