= Phiphidi Dam =

- Official name: Phiphidi Dam
- Country: South Africa
- Location: Thohoyandou, Limpopo
- Opening date: 1971
- Owner: Department of Water Affairs

Dam and spillways
- Impounds: Mutshindudi River
- Height: 16

Reservoir
- Creates: Phiphidi Dam Reservoir
- Total capacity: 187 355

Phiphidi Dam is dam in South Africa. It was established in 1971.

== See also ==
- List of reservoirs and dams in South Africa
