= Hellsgate Dam =

- Official name: Hellsgate Dam
- Country: South Africa
- Location: Uitenhage, Eastern Cape
- Opening date: 1910
- Owner: Department of Water Affairs

Dam and spillways
- Type of dam: Earth fill dam
- Impounds: Klip River
- Height: 28 m
- Length: 4 m

Reservoir
- Creates: Hellsgate Dam Reservoir
- Total capacity: 120 000 m³

Hellsgate Dam is a dam on the Klip River, near Uitenhage, Eastern Cape, South Africa. It was established in 1910.

== See also ==
- List of reservoirs and dams in South Africa
- List of rivers of South Africa
