= Leeu River =

Leeu River, (English: Lion River), The Leeu Taaiboschspruit Catchment is situated in the Greater Sasolburg area in the Free State, South Africa. Armenia Dam is constructed across the river.

Invasive tamarix species are found along the river.

== See also ==
- List of rivers of South Africa
- List of reservoirs and dams in South Africa
