= 111 Battalion =

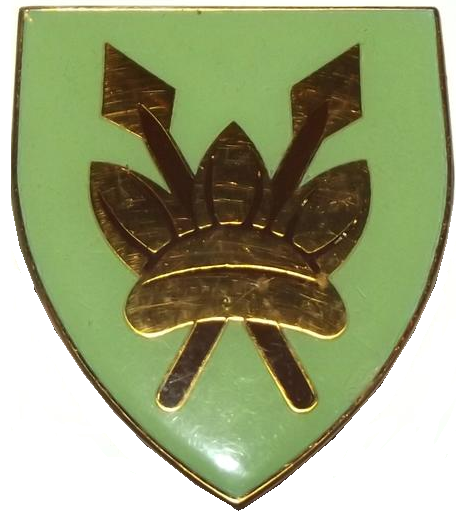
- 111 Battalion emblem
- Active: 1980–1994
- Country: South Africa
- Branch: South African Army
- Type: Motorised infantry
- Part of: South African Army Infantry Corps
- Garrison/HQ: New Amsterdam
- Motto: Luec Doctrinae Light of Knowledge
- Equipment: Buffel APC, Samil 20

Insignia
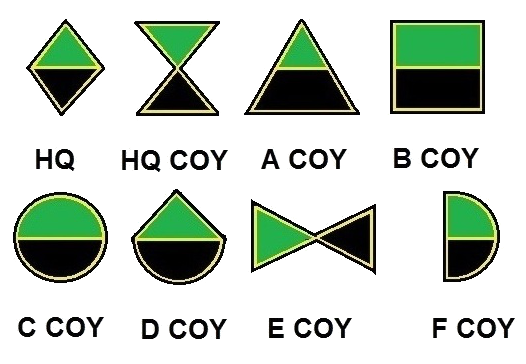
- Company level insignia

- SA Motorised Infantry beret bar circa 1992: SA Motorised Infantry beret bar

111 Battalion was a motorised infantry unit of the South African Army.

== History ==
=== Origin of the black battalions ===
By the late 1970s the South African government had abandoned its opposition to arming black soldiers.

In early 1979, the government also approved a plan to form a number of regional African battalions, each with a particular ethnic identity, which would either serve in their respective homelands or under regional SADF commands.

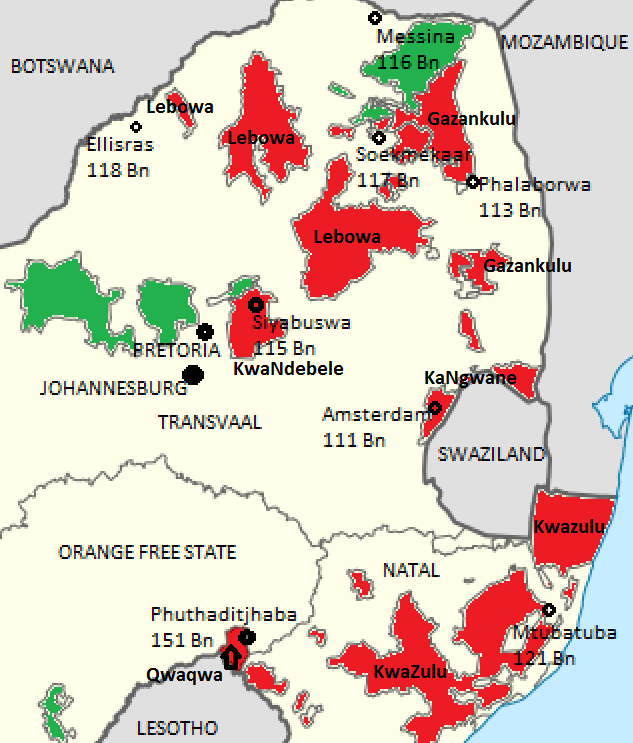
Location of the 100 Battalions in relation to their respective homelands

=== The Swazi Battalion ===
This policy led to the formation of 111 Battalion for Swazis. 111 Battalion was raised in 1980 at Amsterdam, Mpumalanga on the Swaziland Border in the then Eastern Transvaal where a purpose built base was developed for it.

Troops for 111 SA Battalion were recruited from the self-governing territory of KaNgwane, where the SADF itself maintained a base.

=== Higher Command ===
111 Battalion resorted under the command of Eastern Transvaal Command based in Nelspruit.

=== Operational Deployment ===
The battalion was responsible for patrolling the border between Swaziland and South Africa.

=== Disbandment ===
111 Battalion was disbanded around 1999.

== Insignia ==
The badge was designed to represent the head ring and plumes of the Swazi King upon crossed assegais.

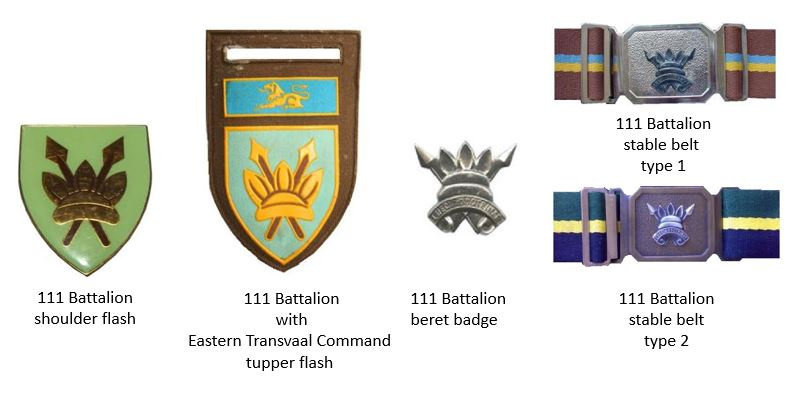
SADF era 111 Battalion insignia

== Notes ==
Peled, A. A question of Loyalty Military Manpower Policy in Multiethinic States, Cornell University Press, 1998, ISBN 0-8014-3239-1 Chapter 2: South Africa: From Exclusion to Inclusion
