= Oudebaaskraal Dam =

- Location within South Africa
- Official name: Oudebaaskraal Dam
- Country: South Africa
- Location: Ceres, Western Cape
- Coordinates: 32°23′27.25″S 19°53′32.65″E
- Purpose: Irrigation
- Opening date: 1969
- Owner: Department of Water Affairs

Dam and spillways
- Type of dam: Earth fill dam
- Impounds: Tankwa River
- Height: 21 metres (69 ft)
- Length: 1,200 metres (3,900 ft)

Reservoir
- Creates: Oudebaaskraal Dam Reservoir
- Total capacity: 34,000,000 cubic metres (1.2×10^{9} cu ft)
- Catchment area: 800 hectares (2,000 acres)

Oudebaaskraal Dam is an earth-fill type dam located on the Tankwa River near Ceres, Western Cape, South Africa. It was established in 1969 and serves mainly for irrigation purposes. The hazard potential of the dam has been ranked significant (2).

Hundreds of pink flamingos can be spotted there at certain times, and the areas of the dam which are covered in algae have a kelp type smell similar to the ocean.

== See also ==
- List of reservoirs and dams in South Africa
- List of rivers of South Africa
