= Nooitgedacht Dam =

- Interactive map of Nooitgedacht Dam
- Official name: Nooitgedacht Dam
- Country: South Africa
- Location: Carolina, Mpumalanga
- Coordinates: 25°57′01″S 30°05′01″E
- Purpose: Irrigation
- Opening date: 1962
- Owner: Department of Water Affairs

Dam and spillways
- Type of dam: Earth fill dam
- Impounds: Komati River
- Height: 41.8 m
- Length: 1053 m

Reservoir
- Creates: Nooitgedacht Dam reservoir
- Total capacity: 78 477 000 m^{3}
- Catchment area: 1 588 km^{2}
- Surface area: 763 ha

Nooitgedacht Dam is an earth-fill type dam located on the Komati River in South Africa. It was established in 1962 and serves mainly for irrigation purposes as well as municipal and industrial use. The hazard potential of the dam has been ranked high (3).

== See also ==
- List of reservoirs and dams in South Africa
