= Ceres Koekedouw Dam =

- Interactive map of Ceres Koekedouw Dam
- Official name: Ceres Koekedouw Dam
- Country: South Africa
- Location: near Ceres, Western Cape
- Coordinates: 33°21′45″S 19°16′31″E
- Purpose: Irrigation
- Owner: Witzenberg Local Municipality

Dam and spillways
- Type of dam: rockfill
- Impounds: Koekedouw River
- Height: 64 m
- Length: 275 m

Reservoir
- Creates: Ceres Koekedouw Dam Reservoir
- Total capacity: 17 200 000 m³
- Surface area: 107 ha

Ceres Koekedouw Dam is a rockfill type dam on the Koekedouw River, near Ceres, Western Cape, South Africa. Its primary purpose is for irrigation.

== See also ==
- List of reservoirs and dams in South Africa
- List of rivers of South Africa
