= Kalkfontein Dam =

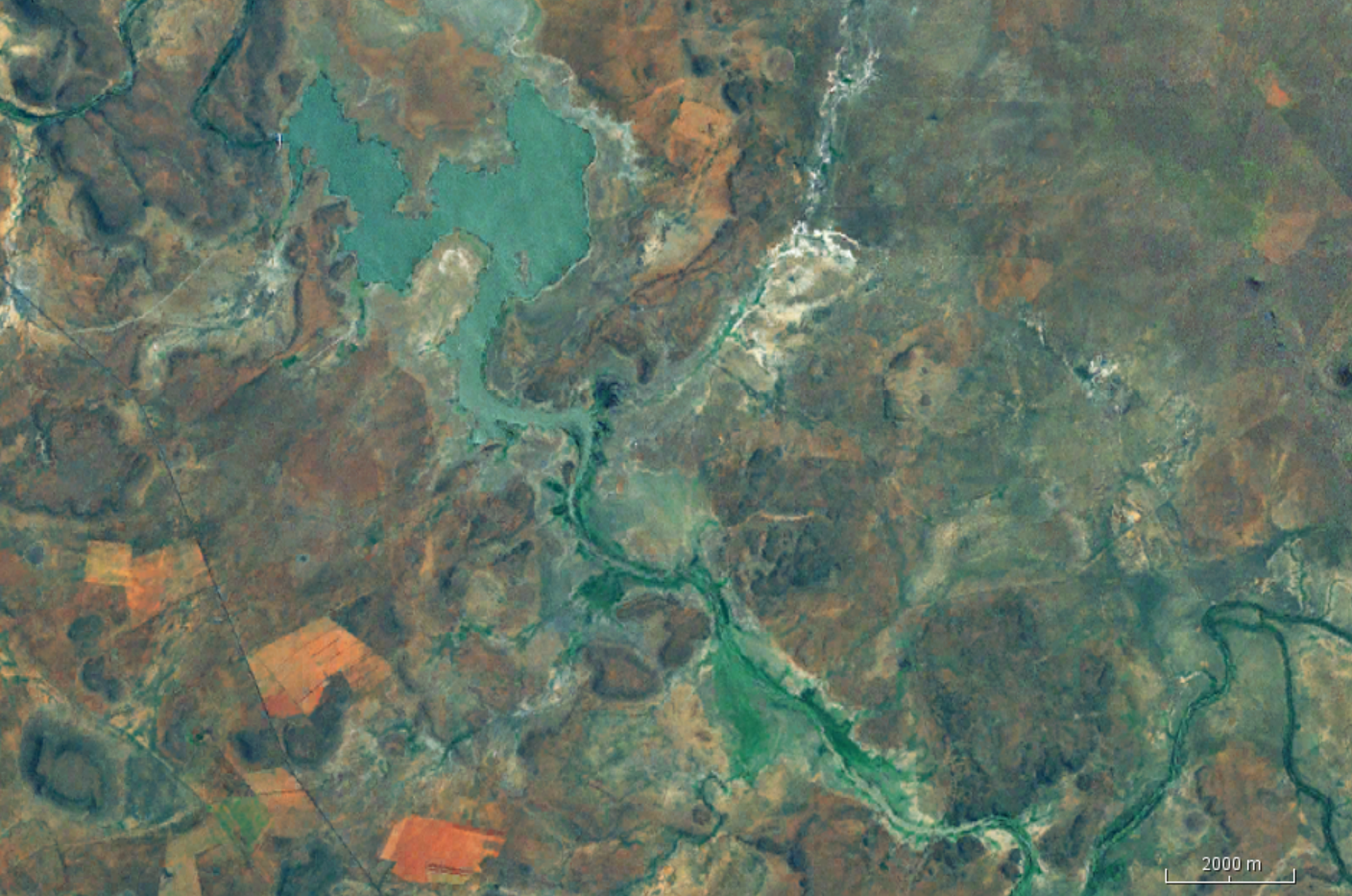
- Kalkfontein Dam from Space
- Interactive map of Kalkfontein Dam
- Official name: Kalkfontein Dam
- Country: South Africa
- Location: Koffiefontein, Free State
- Coordinates: 29°29′45″S 25°13′20″E
- Purpose: Irrigation and household
- Opening date: 1938 (renovated 1977)
- Owner: Department of Water Affairs

Dam and spillways
- Type of dam: rockfill
- Impounds: Riet River
- Height: 36 m
- Length: 317 m

Reservoir
- Creates: Kalkfontein Dam Reservoir
- Total capacity: 258 274 000 m³
- Surface area: 3 769.7 ha

Kalkfontein Dam is a rockfill type dam located on the Riet River, near Koffiefontein, Free State, South Africa. It was established in 1938 and renovated in 1977. The primary purpose of the dam is to serve for irrigation purposes and its hazard potential has been ranked high (3). Kalkfontein Dam reservoir is often quite low (10-20% full) as the upstream area is hot and dry and too small to fill a dam of this size, however during flooding on the Orange River, water is transferred from the Orange River at Vanderkloof Dam to Kalkfontein Dam. In 2021 this led to the reservoir rising from 17.3% to 61.7% in a single week.

== See also ==
- List of reservoirs and dams in South Africa
- List of rivers of South Africa
