= Driekloof Dam (Western Cape) =

- Official name: Driekloof Dam (Western Cape)
- Location: Western Cape, South Africa
- Operators: Department of Water Affairs and Forestry

Dam and spillways
- Impounds: Klip River
- Height: 15 m

Reservoir
- Creates: Driekloof Dam (Western Cape) Reservoir
- Total capacity: 263 000 M³

Driekloof Dam (Western Cape) is dam on the Klip River, Western Cape, South Africa. It was established in 1989.

== See also ==
- List of reservoirs and dams in South Africa
- List of rivers of South Africa
