= Oxkraal Dam =

- Interactive map of Oxkraal Dam
- Official name: Oxkraal Dam
- Country: South Africa
- Location: Whittlesea, Eastern Cape
- Coordinates: 32°12′43″S 26°45′12″E
- Purpose: Irrigation
- Opening date: 1989
- Owner: Department of Water Affairs

Dam and spillways
- Type of dam: earth-fill, rock-fill
- Impounds: Oxkraal River
- Height: 30 m
- Length: 915 m

Reservoir
- Creates: Oxkraal Dam Reservoir
- Total capacity: 18 000 000 m^{3}
- Catchment area: 396 km^{2}
- Surface area: 220 ha

Oxkraal Dam is a zoned earth-fill/rock-fill type dam located on the Oxkraal River, about 8 km South West of Whittlesea, Eastern Cape, South Africa. It was created in 1989 and serves mainly for irrigation purposes. The hazard potential of the dam has been ranked high (3).

== See also ==
- List of reservoirs and dams in South Africa
- List of rivers of South Africa
