= Slangdraai Dam =

- Interactive map of Slangdraai Dam
- Official name: Slangdraai Dam
- Location: KwaZulu-Natal, South Africa
- Coordinates: 28°15′1″S 29°45′1″E
- Opening date: 1986
- Operators: Department of Water Affairs and Forestry

Dam and spillways
- Type of dam: earth-fill
- Impounds: Sundays River
- Height: 15 metres (49 ft)
- Length: 210 metres (690 ft)

Reservoir
- Creates: Slangdraai Dam Reservoir
- Total capacity: 10,300,000 cubic metres (360,000,000 cu ft)
- Surface area: 240 hectares (590 acres)

Slangdraai Dam is an earth-fill type dam located on the Sundays River near Ladysmith, KwaZulu-Natal, South Africa. It was established in 1986 and serves mainly for irrigation purposes. The hazard potential of the dam has been ranked significant (2).

== See also ==
- List of reservoirs and dams in South Africa
- List of rivers of South Africa
