= Metz Dam =

Coordinates: 24.2553°S 30.4522°E

- Interactive map of Metz Dam
- Official name: Metz Dam
- Country: South Africa
- Location: Limpopo
- Owner: Department of Water Affairs

Dam and spillways
- Type of dam: Earth fill dam
- Impounds: Moetladimo River
- Height: 16 metres (52 ft)
- Length: 760 metres (2,490 ft)

Reservoir
- Creates: Metz Dam Reservoir
- Total capacity: 385,000,000 cubic metres (1.36×10^{10} cu ft)
- Surface area: 55 ha

Metz Dam is an earth-fill type dam located on the Moetladimo River, near Trichardsdal, Limpopo [opposite Sekororo Hospital ], South Africa. The dam serves mainly for domestic supply, stock watering and irrigation and its hazard potential has been ranked significant (2).

== See also ==
- List of reservoirs and dams in South Africa
- List of rivers of South Africa
