= Vaalharts Storage Weir =

- Location: South Africa
- Coordinates: 28.115°S 24.925°E

Vaalharts Storage Weir is a dam in South Africa. It was established in 1936. Vaalhartz Weir (alternative spelling) is located on the Vaal River approximately 100 km downstream of Bloemhof Dam and 13 km upstream of Warrenton. The main purpose of the dam is to divert water from the Vaal River (released from Bloemhof Dam) to the Olebogeng Mokoena Government Water Scheme as well as the Barkly Government Water Scheme. Water is also used for numerous small towns including Vryburg, Hartswater, Jan Kempdorp, Warrenton, Winsorton, Kipdam, Barkly West and Delportshoop.

The main construction of the weir was completed in 1938 and was part of the government initiatives to alleviate unemployment following the depression of the 1930s.

In 1967, the weir was raised by 1.2m to its current height of 11m. It is a concrete barrage-type structure, 765m wide with numerous sluices. The sluices are of two types; some for the normal river releases and some for flood management purposes. The dam is designed to handle floods of up to 14200 m³/s.

After the raising of the dam in 1967, it has a storage capacity of 45 million m³. It diverts water into a concrete lined canal on the right flank with a capacity of 40 m³/s. This canal supplies water to approximately 37000 ha of irrigation, most of which is located in the Vaalhartz and Barkly Government Water Schemes.

== See also ==
- List of reservoirs and dams in South Africa
- Department of Water Affairs
