= Da Gama Dam =

- Interactive map of Da Gama Dam
- Official name: Da Gama Dam
- Location: Mpumalanga, South Africa
- Coordinates: 25°8′30″S 31°1′1″E
- Opening date: 1971
- Operators: Department of Water Affairs and Forestry

Dam and spillways
- Type of dam: earth-fill, gravity
- Impounds: Witwaters River
- Height: 36 m
- Length: 238 m

Reservoir
- Creates: Da Gama Dam Reservoir
- Total capacity: 13 578 000 m³
- Surface area: 128.9 ha

Da Gama Dam, is an earthfill/gravity-type dam on the Witwaters River, near White River, Mpumalanga, South Africa. It was established in 1971 and its main purpose is for irrigation. Its hazard potential has been ranked to be high.

== See also ==
- List of reservoirs and dams in South Africa
- List of rivers of South Africa
