= Morgenstond Dam =

- Interactive map of Morgenstond Dam
- Official name: Morgenstond Dam
- Location: Mpumalanga, South Africa
- Coordinates: 26°45′57″S 30°22′10″E
- Opening date: 1978 (renovated: 1991)
- Operators: Department of Water Affairs and Forestry

Dam and spillways
- Type of dam: earth-fill
- Impounds: Ngwempisi River
- Height: 45.3 metres (149 ft)
- Length: 600 metres (2,000 ft)

Reservoir
- Creates: Morgenstond Dam Reservoir
- Total capacity: 100,773,000 cubic metres (3.5588×10^{9} cu ft)
- Catchment area: 548 km^{2}
- Surface area: 977.2 hectares (2,415 acres)

Morgenstond Dam is an earth-fill type dam located on the Ngwempisi River, near Amsterdam, Mpumalanga, South Africa. It was established in 1978 and was renovated in 1991. The dams main purpose is to serve for municipal and industrial use. Its hazard potential has been ranked high (3).

== See also ==
- List of reservoirs and dams in South Africa
- List of rivers of South Africa
