= Kruismansrivier Dam =

Kruisrivier Dam
- Interactive map of Kruisrivier Dam
- Official name: Kruisrivier Dam
- Location: Western Cape, South Africa
- Coordinates: 32°44′5″S 18°50′0″E
- Opening date: 1992
- Operators: Department of Water Affairs and Forestry

Dam and spillways
- Impounds: Kruis River
- Height: 18 m

Reservoir
- Creates: Kruisrivier Dam Reservoir
- Total capacity: 1 500 000 m³
- Surface area: 18 ha

Kruismansrivier Dam, is a dam located on the Kruis River, Western Cape, South Africa. It was established in 1992 and it serves mainly for irrigation. The hazard potential of the dam has been ranked significant (2).

== See also ==
- List of reservoirs and dams in South Africa
- List of rivers of South Africa
