= Klipberg Dam =

- Interactive map of Klipberg Dam
- Official name: Klipberg Dam
- Country: South Africa
- Location: McGregor, Western Cape
- Coordinates: 33°56′30″S 19°47′21″E
- Purpose: Irrigation
- Opening date: 1964
- Operator: Department of Water Affairs

Dam and spillways
- Type of dam: Arch dam
- Impounds: Konings River
- Height: 26 m (85 ft)
- Length: 103 m (338 ft)

Reservoir
- Creates: Klipberg Dam Reservoir
- Total capacity: 1,990,000 m^{3} (70,000,000 cu ft)
- Surface area: 26.5 ha (65 acres)

Klipberg Dam is an arch type dam located on the Konings River, near McGregor, Western Cape, South Africa. It was established in 1964 and its main purpose is to serve for irrigation. It is located in the Breede Water Management Area.

== See also ==
- List of reservoirs and dams in South Africa
- List of rivers of South Africa
