= Boschmanskop No 1 Dam =

Boschmanskop No 1+2 Dam
- Interactive map of Boschmanskop No 1+2 Dam
- Official name: Boschmanskop No 1+2 Dam
- Country: South Africa
- Location: Middelburg, Mpumalanga
- Coordinates: 26°1′6″S 29°37′50″E
- Purpose: Flood control
- Opening date: 1995
- Owner: Optimum Colliery Pullen's Hope

Dam and spillways
- Type of dam: Earth fill dam
- Impounds: Woes-Alleen River
- Height: 21.5 m
- Length: 955 m

Reservoir
- Creates: Boschmanskop No 1+2 Dam Reservoir
- Total capacity: 14 400 000 m³
- Surface area: 185 ha

Boschmanskop No 1+2 Dam, is an earth-fill type dam on the Woes-Alleen River, near Middelburg, Mpumalanga, South Africa. It was established in 1995. Its primary purpose is flood control and it is owned by Optimum Colliery Pullen's Hope.

== See also ==
- List of reservoirs and dams in South Africa
- List of rivers of South Africa
