= Ngodwana Dam =

- Interactive map of Ngodwana Dam
- Official name: Ngodwana Dam
- Location: Ngodwana, Mpumalanga, South Africa
- Coordinates: 25°35′1″S 30°40′5″E
- Opening date: 1982
- Operators: Department of Water Affairs and Forestry

Dam and spillways
- Type of dam: earth-fill
- Impounds: Ngodwana River
- Height: 44 metres (144 ft)
- Length: 450 metres (1,480 ft)

Reservoir
- Creates: Ngodwana Dam Reservoir
- Total capacity: 10,400,000 cubic metres (370,000,000 cu ft)
- Catchment area: 229 km^{2}
- Surface area: 87 hectares (210 acres)

Ngodwana Dam is an earth-fill type dam located on the Ngodwana River, just south of Ngodwana, Mpumalanga, South Africa. It was established in 1982 and serves primarily for municipal use and industrial purposes. The hazard potential of the dam has been ranked high (3).

== See also ==
- List of reservoirs and dams in South Africa
- List of rivers of South Africa
