= Lake Mzingazi Dam =

- Interactive map of Lake Mzingazi Dam
- Official name: Lake Mzingazi Dam
- Location: KwaZulu-Natal, South Africa
- Coordinates: 28°46′1″S 32°5′1″E
- Opening date: 1942
- Operators: Department of Water Affairs and Forestry

Dam and spillways
- Impounds: Mzingazi River
- Height: 8 m
- Length: 1 800 m

Reservoir
- Creates: Lake Mzingazi
- Total capacity: 37 000 000 m³
- Surface area: 1 100 ha

Lake Mzingazi Dam is a dam on the Mzingazi River, near Richards Bay, KwaZulu-Natal, South Africa. It was established in 1942.

== See also ==
- List of reservoirs and dams in South Africa
- List of rivers of South Africa
