= Modderpoort Dam =

- Interactive map of Modderpoort Dam
- Official name: Modderpoort Dam
- Location: Western Cape, South Africa
- Coordinates: 31°56′50″S 22°8′1″E
- Opening date: 1953
- Operators: Department of Water Affairs and Forestry

Dam and spillways
- Type of dam: buttress & earth-fill
- Impounds: Rietfontein River
- Height: 15 metres (49 ft)
- Length: 710 metres (2,330 ft)

Reservoir
- Creates: Modderpoort Dam Reservoir
- Total capacity: 10,000,000 cubic metres (350,000,000 cu ft)
- Surface area: 125 hectares (310 acres)

Modderpoort Dam is a combined buttress & earth-fill type dam located on the Rietfontein River, near Beaufort West, Western Cape, South Africa. It was established in 1953 and serves primarily for irrigation purposes. The hazard potential of the dam has been ranked significant (2).

== See also ==
- List of reservoirs and dams in South Africa
- List of rivers of South Africa
