= Spitskop Dam =

Dam in the Northern Cape province, South Africa

- Interactive map of Spitskop Dam
- Official name: Spitskop Dam
- Country: South Africa
- Location: North of Kimberley in the Northern Cape province.
- Coordinates: 28.1232°S 24.502°E
- Purpose: Irrigation
- Opening date: 1975 (renovated 1989)
- Owner: Department of Water Affairs

Dam and spillways
- Type of dam: Earth fill dam
- Impounds: Harts River
- Height: 16 m
- Length: 900 m

Reservoir
- Creates: Spitskop Dam Reservoir
- Total capacity: 57 887 000 m^{3}
- Catchment area: 26 922 km^{2}
- Surface area: 2509 ha

Spitskop Dam is an earth-fill type dam located on the Harts River in the Northern Cape Province north of the city of Kimberley in South Africa. It was established in 1975 and rebuilt in 1989 after breaching during a flood in 1988. It has a full capacity of 57.887 million cubic meters of water and serves primarily for irrigation purposes. The hazard potential of the dam has been ranked high (3).

== See also ==
- List of reservoirs and dams in South Africa
