= Kromfonteinlower (Wilge) Cofferdam =

- Interactive map of Kromfonteinlower (Wilge) Cofferdam
- Official name: Kromfonteinlower (Wilge) Cofferdam
- Location: Mpumalanga, South Africa
- Coordinates: 26°5′0″S 29°15′0″E
- Opening date: 1992
- Operators: Department of Water Affairs and Forestry

Dam and spillways
- Type of dam: rockfill
- Impounds: Steenkool Spruit
- Height: 15 m
- Length: 780 m

Reservoir
- Creates: Kromfonteinlower Reservoir
- Total capacity: 13 000 000 m³
- Surface area: 30 ha

Kromfonteinlower (Wilge) Cofferdam is a rockfill type dam located on the Steenkool Spruit, near Witbank, Mpumalanga, South Africa. It was established in 1992 and its primary purpose is to serve for river diversion. The hazard potential of the dam has been ranked significant (2).

== See also ==
- List of reservoirs and dams in South Africa
- List of rivers of South Africa
