= Westoe Dam =

- Interactive map of Westoe Dam
- Official name: Westoe Dam
- Location: Mpumalanga, South Africa
- Coordinates: 26°30′15″S 30°37′5″E
- Opening date: 1968 (renovated: 1973)
- Operators: Department of Water Affairs and Forestry

Dam and spillways
- Type of dam: concrete-gravity
- Impounds: Usutu River
- Height: 26 metres (85 ft)
- Length: 1,056 metres (3,465 ft)

Reservoir
- Creates: Westoe Dam Reservoir
- Total capacity: 61,900,000 cubic metres (2.19×10^{9} cu ft)
- Catchment area: 533 km^{2}
- Surface area: 726 hectares (1,790 acres)

Westoe Dam is a concrete-gravity type dam located on the Usutu River near Amsterdam, Mpumalanga, South Africa. It was established in 1968 and has been renovated in 1973. The dam serves mainly for municipal and industrial water supply and its hazard potential has been ranked high (3).

== See also ==
- List of reservoirs and dams in South Africa
- List of rivers of South Africa
