= Damani Dam =

- Interactive map of Damani Dam
- Official name: Damani Dam
- Location: Limpopo, South Africa
- Coordinates: 22°50′7″S 30°31′22″E
- Opening date: 1991
- Operators: Department of Water Affairs and Forestry

Dam and spillways
- Type of dam: earthfill
- Impounds: Mbwedi River
- Height: 35 m

Reservoir
- Creates: Damani Dam Reservoir
- Total capacity: 11 000 000 m³
- Surface area: 130 ha

Damani Dam, is an earth-fill type dam on the Mbwedi River, near Thohoyandou (former capital of Venda), Limpopo, South Africa. It was established in 1991. Its primary purpose is for industrial and municipal usage. Its hazard potential has been ranked as significant.

== See also ==
- List of reservoirs and dams in South Africa
- List of rivers of South Africa
