= Tsojana Dam =

- Interactive map of Tsojana Dam
- Official name: Tsojana Dam
- Location: Eastern Cape, South Africa
- Coordinates: 31°53′0″S 27°38′1″E
- Opening date: 1978
- Operators: Department of Water Affairs and Forestry

Dam and spillways
- Type of dam: earth-fill
- Impounds: Ncuncuzo River
- Height: 24 metres (79 ft)
- Length: 180 metres (590 ft)

Reservoir
- Creates: Tsojana Dam Reservoir
- Total capacity: 12,340,000 cubic metres (436,000,000 cu ft)
- Catchment area: 85.6 km^{2}
- Surface area: 203 hectares (500 acres)

Tsojana Dam is an earth-fill type dam located on the Ncuncuzo River near Cofimvaba, Eastern Cape (former Transkei), South Africa. It was established in 1978 and serves mainly for municipal and industrial use. The hazard potential of the dam has been ranked significant (2).

== See also ==
- List of reservoirs and dams in South Africa
- List of rivers of South Africa
