= Doring River Dam =

- Interactive map of Doring River Dam
- Official name: Doring River Dam
- Location: Eastern Cape, South Africa
- Coordinates: 31°30′47″S 27°20′30″E
- Opening date: 1971
- Operators: Department of Water Affairs and Forestry

Dam and spillways
- Type of dam: earthfill
- Impounds: Doring River
- Height: 27.5 m
- Length: 513.2 m

Reservoir
- Creates: Doring River Dam Reservoir
- Total capacity: 19 690 000 m³
- Catchment area: 295 km^{2}
- Surface area: 367 ha

Doring River Dam is an earth-fill type dam on the Doring River, near Indwe, Eastern Cape, South Africa. It was established in 1971. Primarily it serves for domestic use and industrial purposes and its hazard potential has been ranked high.

== See also ==
- List of reservoirs and dams in South Africa
- List of rivers of South Africa
