= List of dams in South Africa =

The following is a partial list of dams in South Africa.

In South African English (under influence of Afrikaans), a dam refers to both the wall as well as the reservoir or lake that builds up as a consequence.

== List of dams (reservoirs) ==
Name (Alt.)	Nearest locale	province	Impounds	Year completed (commissioned)	Reservoir volume ML	Surface area (km^{2})	Wall height (metres)	Map ref
Albasini Dam	Louis Trichardt	Limpopo	Levubu River (Luvuvhu River)	1952	28,200^{[N]}	3.498	34	23°6′30″S 30°7′48″E
Albert Falls Dam	Pietermaritzburg	KZN	Umgeni River	1976	288,100^{[N]}	23.521	33	29°26′10″S 30°23′18″E
Alexandra Dam	Cape Town	Western Cape	Disa River	1903	126	0.03	12.1	33°59′17″S 18°24′42″E
Allemanskraal Dam	Ventersburg	Free State	Sand River	1960	174,500^{[N]}	26.481	38	28°17′15″S 27°9′1″E
Alphen Dam	Stellenbosch	Western Cape	Bonte River	1990	70^{[G]}	0.8	18.3	34°00′42″S 18°52′25″E
Arieskraal Dam	Grabouw	Western Cape	Palmiet River	1987	17,330	1.42		34°14′40″S 18°59′03″E
Armenia Dam	Hobhouse	Free State	Leeu River	1954	13,000^{[N]}	3.933	22	29°21′52″S 27°7′44″E
Beervlei Dam	Willowmore	Eastern Cape	Groot River	1957	85,800^{[N]}	23.145	31	33°4′37″S 23°29′26″E
Bedford Dam	NE van Reenen Pass	Free State		2011	22,000^{[I]}	2.55	41	28°14′20″S 29°35′8″E
Berg River Dam	Franschhoek	Western Cape	Berg River	2007	130,010^{[N]}	5.260	68	33°54′34″S 19°03′21″E
Binfield Park Dam	Alice, Eastern Cape	Eastern Cape	Tyhume River	1986 (1987)	36,830	1.870	60	32°41′55″S 26°54′18″E
Bivane Dam (Paris Dam)	Vryheid	KZN	Bivane River	2000	115,200	7	72	27°31′10″S 31°3′15″E
Bloemhoek Dam	Kroonstad	Free State	Jordaan Spruit	1976	26,400	2.800	28	27°38′1″S 27°17′0″E
Bloemhof Dam (Oppermansdrif)	Bloemhof	border North West Free State	Vaal River	1970	1,240,200^{[N]}	230.665	33	27°40′5″S 25°37′3″E
Blyderivierpoort Dam	Hoedspruit	Mpumalanga	Blyde River	1974	54,400^{[N]}	2.494	71	24°32′15″S 30°47′20″E
Boegoeberg Dam	Prieska	Northern Cape	Orange River	1929	19,800^{[N]}	7.423	12	29°2′30″S 22°12′13″E
Bon Accord Dam	Tshwane	Gauteng	Apies River	1925	4,400^{[N]}	1.440	18	25°37′45″S 28°11′21″E
Bongolo Dam (Bonkolo)	Queenstown	Eastern Cape	Komani River	1908	7,015	1.1	24	31°52′04″S 26°55′15″E
Boskop Dam	Potchefstroom	North West	Mooi River	1959	20,840^{[N]}	3.741	33	26°33′42″S 27°6′41″E
Boschmanskop No 1 Dam	Middelburg	Mpumalanga	Woes-Alleen River	1995	14,400	0.185	22	26°1′6″S 29°37′50″E
Bospoort Dam	Rustenburg	North West	Hex River	1933	15,800^{[N]}	3.741	28	25°33′45″S 27°21′14″E
Bramhoek Dam	NE van Reenen Pass	KZN	Braamhoek Spruit	2011	22,000^{[I]}	2.56	27.5	28°18′41″S 29°34′35″E
Brandvlei Dam	Rawsonville	Western Cape	Lower Brandvlei River	1983	286,040^{[N]}	24.49	14	33°41′20″S 19°22′40″E
Bridle Drift Dam	East London	Eastern Cape	Buffels River	1969	101,600^{[N]}	7.460	55	32°59′22″S 27°43′14″E
Bronkhorstspruit Dam	Bronkhorstspruit	Gauteng	Bronkhorst Spruit	1950	57,400^{[N]}	9.609	35	25°53′15″S 28°43′15″E
Buffeljags Dam	Swellendam	Western Cape	Buffeljags River	1967	4,540^{[N]}	1.269	24	34°01′07″S 20°31′58″E
Buffelspoort Dam	Rustenburg	North West	Sterkstroom River	1934	10,251	1.357	34	25°46′50″S 27°29′1″E
Ceres Koekedouw Dam	Ceres	Western Cape	Koekedouw River	2001	17,200	1.07	60	33°21′45″S 19°16′31″E
Churchill Dam (Krom River Dam)	Kareedouw	Eastern Cape	Krom River	1943	35,500	2.492	43	34°00′03″S 24°29′36″E
Clanwilliam Dam	Clanwilliam	Western Cape	Olifants River	1935	121,800	11.236	43	32°11′5″S 18°52′29″E
Craigie Burn Dam	Greytown	KZN	Mnyamvubu River	1963	22,500^{[N]}	2.073	38	29°9′47″S 30°17′2″E
Dap Naudé Dam	Polokwane	Limpopo	Broederstroom River	1958	1,900^{[N]}	.281	23	23°48′49″S 29°57′59″E
Da Gama Dam	White River	Mpumalanga	Witwaters River	1971	13,578	1.289	38	25°8′30″S 31°1′1″E
Damani Dam (Mvuwe Dame)	Thohoyandou	Limpopo	Mbwedi River	1991	11,000	1.30	28	22°51′3″S 30°30′56″E
Darlington Dam (Lake Mentz)	Kirkwood	Eastern Cape	Sundays River	1922	188,800^{[N]}	34.527	48	33°12′22″S 25°8′59″E
De Bos Dam	Hemel En Aarde	Western Cape	Onus River	1994	5,740	0.43	24	34°22′05″S 19°14′01″E
De Hoop Dam	Graaff-Reinet	Eastern Cape	Kamdeboo River	1938	14,500		21	32°27′1″S 24°25′4″E
De Hoop Dam (Limpopo)	Steelpoort	Limpopo	Steelpoort River	2014	348,700	16.9	81	24°57′27″S 29°57′23″E
De Villiers Dam	Cape Town	Western Cape	Disa River	1910	243	28		33°59′31″S 18°24′35″E
Disaneng Dam	Mmabatho	North West	Molopo River	1980	17,400	4.253	17	25°49′25″S 25°18′20″E
Doorndraai Dam	Mokopane	Limpopo	Sterk River	1952	43,800^{[N]}	5.606	25	24°16′45″S 28°46′1″E
Doring River Dam	Indwe	Eastern Cape	Doring River	1971	19,690	3.592	35	31°30′47″S 27°20′30″E
Douglas Weir	Douglas	Northern Cape	Vaal River	1977	16,700	7.991	10	29°2′37″S 23°50′11″E
Driekloof Dam	Hermanus	Western Cape	Klip River	1989	263	0.56	15	28°31′58.5″S 29°4′05.9″E
Driekloof Dam	Harrismith	Free State	Nuwejaar Spruit	1979	32,071^{[D^]}	1.906	47	28°31′1″S 29°4′1″E
Driekoppies Dam	Malelane	Mpumalanga	Lomati River	1998	250,900^{[N]}	18.700	50	25°42′42″S 31°31′49″E
Driel Barrage	Bergville	KZN	Tugela River	1973	8700	2.99	22	28°45′46″S 29°17′27″E
Ebenezer Dam	Tzaneen	Limpopo	Groot Letaba River	1959	69,100^{[N]}	3.862	61	23°56′30″S 29°59′1″E
Egmont Dam	Van Stadensrus	Free State	Witte Spruit	1937	9300^{[N]}	2.442	25	30°03′10″S 27°01′39″E
Eikenhof Dam	Grabouw	Western Cape	Palmiet River	1977	28,900^{[N]}	2.40	46	34°7′46″S 19°2′5″E
Elandskloof Dam	Villiersdorp	Western Cape	Elands River	1976	11,017	0.700	69	33°57′1″S 19°17′1″E
Elandskuil Dam		North West	Swartleegte River	1969	1181^{[N]}	0.45	11	26°20′34″S 26°46′42″E
Emmarentia Dam	Johannesburg	Gauteng	Braamfontein Spruit	1912	250^{[G]}	0.09	11	26°09′01″S 28°00′21″E
Engelhard Dam	Letaba camp, Kruger National Park	Limpopo	Letaba River	~1975				23°50′30″S 31°38′15″E
Erfenis Dam	Theunissen	Free State	Groot-Vet River	1960	206,100^{[N]}	32.821	46	28°30′39″S 26°46′38″E
Fika-Patso Dam	Phuthaditjhaba	Free State	Namahadi River	1987	28,000	1.585	65	28°40′20″S 28°51′24″E
Flag Boshielo Dam	Marble Hall	Limpopo	Olifants River	1987	185,100^{[N]}	12.877	36	24°47′0″S 29°25′40″E
Floriskraal Dam	Laingsburg	Western Cape	Buffels River	1957	50,334	7.592	33	33°17′30″S 20°59′26″E
Gamkapoort Dam	Prince Albert	Western Cape	Gamka River	1969	37,213	6.015	42	33°18′33″S 21°38′1″E
Garden Route Dam	George	Western Cape	Swart River	1984	9,980	0.871		33°57′51″S 22°30′51″E
Gariep Dam (Hendrik Verwoerd Dam)	Norvalspont	Free State	Orange River	1971	5,340,600^{[N]}	352.162	88	30°37′30″S 25°30′58″E
Glen Alpine Dam	Mokopane	Limpopo	Mogalakwena River	1968	18,900^{[N]}	4.613	28	23°11′30″S 28°41′5″E
Glen Melville Dam	Grahamstown	Eastern Cape	Orange–Fish River Tunnel	1992	6,300			33°11′6″S 26°39′19″E
Goedertrouw Dam	Eshowe	KZN	Mhlatuze River	1982	301,300	11.939	88	28°46′17″S 31°28′7″E
Grassridge Dam	Hofmeyer	Eastern Cape	Great Brak River	1924	46,200	14.145	24	31°45′30″S 25°28′1″E
Grey Dam	Grahamstown	Eastern Cape	Bloukrans River	1859	68			33°19′29″S 26°31′40″E
Groendal Dam	Uitenhage	Eastern Cape	Swartkops River	1934	12,100	0.960		33°42′26″S 25°15′57″E
Grootdraai Dam	Standerton	Mpumalanga	Vaal River	1981	349,500^{[N]}	38.813	42	26°55′9″S 29°17′1″E
Gubu Dam	Stutterheim	Eastern Cape	Gubu River	1971	8,666	1.1	26	32°36′35″S 27°16′41″E
Hartbeespoort Dam	Brits	North West	Crocodile River	1925	186,400^{[N]}	20.652	59	25°43′33″S 27°50′55″E
Hazelmere Dam	Hazelmere	KZN	Mdloti River	1977	37,133	1.813	50	29°36′1″S 31°2′30″E
Hellsgate Dam	Uitenhage	Eastern Cape	Klip River	1910	120		26	
Hely-Hutchinson Dam	Cape Town	Western Cape	Disa River	1904	925	0.16		33°58′38″S 18°24′28″E
Heyshope Dam	Piet Retief	Mpumalanga	Assegaai River	1983	451,300^{[N]}	50.238	29	26°59′45″S 30°31′50″E
Hluhluwe Dam	Hluhluwe	KZN	Hluhluwe River	1965	25,900	3.64	33	28°7′19″S 32°10′45″E
Holo Hlahatse Dam	Jozana's Hoek Sterkspruit	Eastern Cape	Hlatimnyama and Mhlangeni Rivers		10,000	0.8	30	30°38′12″S 27°22′11″E
Howieson's Poort Dam (Howison's Poort)	Grahamstown	Eastern Cape	Kariega River	1931	227			33°23′9″S 26°28′59″E
Impofu Dam	Humansdorp	Eastern Cape	Krom River	1982	105,800^{[N]}	6.350	75	34°5′44″S 24°41′25″E
Inanda Dam	Hillcrest	KZN	Umgeni River	1989	241,700^{[N]}	14.633	65	29°42′1″S 30°52′1″E
Injaka Dam (also spelled Inyaka)	Hazyview	Mpumalanga	Marite River	2002	123,700^{[N]}	8.111	53	24°53′6″S 31°5′5″E
Jericho Dam	Amsterdam	Mpumalanga	Mpama River	1966	59,500	9.825	22	26°39′15″S 30°29′10″E
J.L. de Bruin Dam	Burgersdorp	Eastern Cape	Klein Buffel River	1982	1696	0.06	15	31°01′44″S 26°37′25″E
Kalkfontein Dam	Koffiefontein	Free State	Riet River	1938	325,100^{[N]}	37.697	36	29°29′45″S 25°13′20″E
Kammanassie Dam	De Rust	Western Cape	Kammanassie River	1923	35,870	3.516	35	33°38′39″S 22°24′31″E
Katrivier Dam	Seymour	Eastern Cape	Kat River	1969	24,690	2.129	55	32°34′15″S 26°45′1″E
Katse Dam		Lesotho	Malibamatšo River	1996	1,950,000	35.80	185	29°20′13″S 28°30′22″E
Keerom Dam	Worcester	Western Cape	Nuy River	1954	10,400	1.17	40	33°35′10″S 19°42′27″E
Kettingspruit Dam		Mpumalanga	tributary of Ketting Spruit	2006	70,000	0.027	8.5	24°10′10″S 30°31′0″E
Kilburn Dam	Bergville	KZN	Mnjaneni River	1981	35,577^{[D]}	1.947	51	28°35′25″S 29°6′15″E
Kleinplaats Dam	Simon's Town	Western Cape			1,368	0.24		
Klerkskraal Dam	Ventersdorp	North West	Mooi River	1965	7,900^{[N]}	3.773	15	26°13′59″S 27°08′55″E
Klipberg Dam	McGregor	Western Cape	Konings River	1964	1,980	0.26	29	33°56′29″S 19°47′36″E
Klipdrif Dam	Potchefstroom	North West	Loop Spruit	1918	13,300^{[N]}	4.713	12	26°37′0″S 27°18′1″E
Klipfontein Dam	Vryheid	KZN	White Mfolozi River	1983	18,080	2.95	28	27°50′11″S 30°48′51″E
Klipkoppie Dam	White River	Mpumalanga	White River	1960	12,256	2.354	20	25°13′1″S 31°1′10″E
Klipvoor Dam	Brits	North West	Pienaars River	1970	47,000	7.532	30	25°7′54″S 27°48′33″E
Knellpoort Dam	Wepener	Free State	Riet Spruit	1988	130,000^{[N]}	9.854	50	29°46′54″S 26°53′19″E
Kogelberg Dam	Grabouw	Western Cape	Palmiet River	1986	17,330^{[P]}	1.428	54	34°12′57″S 18°58′31″E
Kommandodrif Dam	Cradock	Eastern Cape	Tarka River	1956	58,114	8.820	39	32°7′1″S 26°3′9″E
Koppies Dam	Koppies	Free State	Renoster River	1911	42,300^{[N]}	13.622	25	27°15′25″S 27°40′15″E
Korintepoort Dam	Krantz Kloof	Western Cape	Korinte River	1966	8,090	1.029	16	34°00′17″S 21°09′56″E
Kouga Dam (Paul Sauer Dam)	Patensie	Eastern Cape	Kouga River	1969	125,900^{[N]}	5.545	81	33°44′28″S 24°35′18″E
Kromfonteinlower (Wilge) Cofferdam	Witbank	Mpumalanga	Steenkool Spruit	1992	13,000	0.300	17	26°5′0″S 29°15′30″E
Kromfontein Middle Cofferdam	Witbank	Mpumalanga	Steenkool Spruit	1990	18,000		16	26°7′0″S 29°15′20″E
Krugersdrift	Bloemfontein	Free State	Modder River	1970	66,000	18.525	26	28°53′1″S 25°57′30″E
Kruismansrivier Dam		Western Cape	Kruismans River	1997	1,500	0.18	18	32°44′35″S 18°50′10″E
Kwaggaskloof Dam	Worcester	Western Cape	Wabooms River	1975	169,410^{[N]}	16.12	18	33°45′46″S 19°28′18″E
Kwene Dam (Braam Raubenheimer Dam)	Lydenburg	Mpumalanga	Crocodile River	1987	158,900^{[N]}	12.504	52	25°21′45″S 30°22′30″E
Lady Grey Dam	Lady Grey	Eastern Cape	Wilgespruit	1925	153	0.018	23	30°42′41″S 27°14′26″E
Laing Dam	East London	Eastern Cape	Buffalo River	1951	19,860	2.038	45	32°57′59″S 27°29′22″E
Lake Arthur Dam	Cradock	Eastern Cape	Tarka River	1924	10,700	8.867	38	32°13′1″S 25°49′45″E
Lake Mzingazi Dam	Richards Bay	KZN	Mzingazi River	1942	37,000	11.000	8	28°46′1″S 32°5′1″E
Lakenvallei Dam	Ceres	Western Cape	Sanddrifskloof River	1974	10,300^{[N]}	0.825	56	33°22′0″S 19°34′52″E
Land-en-Zeezicht Dam	Helderberg	Western Cape			451			
Leeu-Gamka Dam	Beaufort West	Western Cape	Leeuw River	1958	13,600	4.258	15	32°37′23″S 22°00′13″E
Lewis Gay Dam	Simon's Town	Western Cape			182			
Lindleyspoort Dam	Swartruggens	North West	Elands River	1943	14,381	1.801	39	25°29′50″S 26°41′32″E
Loskop Dam	Groblersdal	Mpumalanga	Olifants River	1939	361,500^{[N]}	24.277	54	25°25′1″S 29°21′1″E
Lubisi Dam	Qamata	Eastern Cape	Indwe River	1968	158,000^{[N]}	11.290	52	31°47′45″S 27°25′0″E
Luphephe Dam	Musina	Limpopo	Luphephe River	1963	14,000^{[N]}	1.416	42	22°38′4″S 30°24′8″E
Madikwe Dam	Madikwe	North West	Thulane River	1976	14,000	4.318	17	25°23′36″S 26°35′51″E
Makuleke Dam	Giyani	Limpopo	Mphongolo River	1990	13,000	0.750	22	22°52′3″S 30°54′18″E
Marico-Bosveld Dam	Groot Marico	North West	Groot Marico River	1933	27,813	4.376	34	25°28′15″S 26°23′50″E
Metz Dam	Trichardsdal	Limpopo	Mortladime River		385	0.55	18	
Middelburg Dam	Middelburg	Mpumalanga	Klein Olifants River	1978	48,435	4.680	36	25°46′31″S 29°32′46″E
Middle Letaba Dam	Giyani	Limpopo	Middle Letaba River	1984	171,900	18.787	34	23°16′26″S 30°24′12″E
Midmar Dam	Howick	KZN	Umgeni	1965	235,400^{[N]}	15.643	32	29°29′43″S 30°12′1″E
Misverstand Dam	Porterville	Western Cape	Berg River	1977	6,400^{[N]}	2.552	26	33°01′32″S 18°47′20″E
Modderpoort Dam	Beaufort West	Northern Cape	Rietfontein River	1953	10,000	0.125	15	31°56′43″S 22°8′40″E
Mohale Dam		Lesotho	Senqunyane River	2002	938,000	22.0	144	29°27′24″S 28°05′45″E
Mokolo Dam (Hans Strijdom Dam)	Lephalale	Limpopo	Mokolo River	1980	145,400^{[N]}	8.288	57	23°58′30″S 27°43′1″E
Molatedi Dam	Zeerust	North West	Marico River	1986	200,800^{[N]}	35.670	23	24°52′13″S 26°27′1″E
Molteno Dam	Cape Town	Western Cape	Table Mountain rivers	1881	3,000^{[N]}	0.36	15	33°56′18″S 18°24′43″E
Morgenstond Dam	Amsterdam	Mpumalanga	Ngwempisi River	1978	100,773	9.772	43	26°42′40″S 30°32′41″E
Moutloatsi Setlogelo Dam (Groothoek)	Thaba Nchu	Free State	Kgabanyane River	1981	12,000	2.5	29	29°18′12″S 26°50′49″E
Mthatha Dam	Mthatha	Eastern Cape	Mthatha River	1977	253,674	25.417	18	31°33′2″S 28°44′24″E
Mutshedzi Dam	Thohoyandou	Limpopo	Mutshedzi River	1990	2,300^{[N]}	0.392	25	22°56′55″S 30°9′40″E
Nagle Dam	Cato Ridge	KZN	Umgeni River	1950	23,200^{[N]}	1.561	46	29°35′1″S 30°37′1″E
Nahoon Dam	East London	Eastern Cape	Nahoon River	1966	19,934	2.347	44	32°54′36″S 27°48′55″E
Nandoni Dam	Thohoyandou	Limpopo	Levuvhu River	2004	166,100^{[N]}	15.700	47	22°58′51″S 30°35′53″E
Ncora Dam	Tsomo	Eastern Cape	Tsomo River	1975	150,100^{[N]}	13.920	44	31°47′15″S 27°40′1″E
Ngodwana Dam	Nelspruit	Mpumalanga	Ngodwana River	1984	10,400	8.660	47	25°35′1″S 30°40′5″E
Ngotwane Dam	Lobatieng	North West	Ngotwane River	1982	18,800	3.900	19	25°11′56″S 25°48′47″E
Nooitgedacht Dam (Vygeboom)	Carolina	Mpumalanga	Komati River	1962	78,400^{[N]}	4.630	42	25°57′1″S 30°5′1″E
Nsami Dam (Hudson Ntsanwisi Dam)	Giyani	Limpopo	Nsama River	1976	21,900	5.15	24	23°15′16″S 30°46′14″E
Nqweba Dam (Previously Vanryneveld's Pass Dam)	Graaff-Reinet	Eastern Cape	Sundays River	1925	46,369	10.285		32°14′8″S 24°31′41″E
Nwanedi Dam	Musina	Limpopo	Nwanedi River	1964	5,100^{[N]}	0.56	36	22°38′6″S 30°23′56″E
Ntshingwayo Dam (Chelmsford Dam)	Newcastle	KZN	Nsama River	1961	194,600^{[N]}	34.412		27°57′12″S 29°57′0″E
Nzhelele Dam	Musina	Limpopo	Nzhelele River	1948	51,200^{[N]}	5.442	47	22°43′29″S 30°5′43″E
Ohrigstad Dam	Ohrigstad	Mpumalanga	Ohrigstad River	1955	13,400^{[N]}	0.99	52	24°55′59″S 30°37′54″E
Olifantsnek Dam	Rustenburg	North West	Hex River	1928	14,200	2.548	31	25°47′3″S 27°15′52″E
Oliphantskop Dam	Ladysmith	KZN	Sondagsrivier	1984	0,000	0.000	16	28°28′5″S 30°3′23″E
Osplaas Dam	De Doorns	Western Cape	-	2007	2,700	-	34	33°27′4.77″S 19°43′54.86″E
Oudebaaskraal Dam	Ceres	Western Cape	Tankwa River	1969	34,000	8.000	21	32°23′26″S 19°53′35″E
Oxkraal Dam	Queenstown	Eastern Cape	Oxkraal River	1989	14,900^{[N]}	2.2	30	32°12′43″S 26°45′12″E
Phiphidi Dam	Thohoyandou	Limpopo	Mutshindudi River	1971	187,355		16	
Pietersfontein Dam	Montagu	Western Cape	Pietersfontein River	1968	1,984	0.033	18	33°40′12″S 20°00′59″E
Pongolapoort Dam	Jozini	KZN	Pongola River	1973	2,267,100^{[N]}	132.728	89	27°25′15″S 32°4′30″E
Poortjieskloof Dam	Montagu	Western Cape	Groot River	1955	9,700^{[N]}	1.029	38	33°51′30″S 20°22′16″E
Potchefstroom Dam	Potchefstroom	North West	Mooi River	1950	2,027	0.77	8	26°40′12″S 27°5′50″E
Qedusizi Dam	Ladysmith	KZN	Klip River	1998	194,000	2.5		28°32′30″S 29°44′41″E
Rhenosterkop Dam	Marble Hall	Mpumalanga	Elands River	1984	204,600^{[N]}	62.400		25°5′55″S 28°55′5″E
Rietvlei Dam	Tshwane	Gauteng	Rietvlei River, a tributary to the Hennops River	1933	12,300^{[N]}	1.890	21	25°52′36″S 28°15′57″E
Rockview Dam	Grabouw	Western Cape	Palmiet River	1986	16,630^{[P]}	0.775	48	34°11′30″S 18°57′17″E
Roode Els Berg Dam	De Doorns	Western Cape	Sanddrifskloof River	1969	8210	36	72	33°26′10″S 19°34′05″E
Roodekoppies Dam	Brits	North West	Crocodile River	1984	103,000	15.710	25	25°24′15″S 27°35′29″E
Roodeplaat Dam	Tshwane	Gauteng	Pienaars River	1959	41,200^{[N]}	3.952	59	25°37′15″S 28°22′1″E
Rust de Winter Dam	Pretoria	Limpopo	Elands River	1934	28,200	4.73	31	25°14′0″S 28°31′3″E
Rustfontein Dam	Thaba Nchu	Free State	Modder River	1955	72,200	11.585	36	29°16′15″S 26°37′1″E
Sandile Dam	Keiskammahoek	Eastern Cape	Keiskamma River	1983	30,960	1.460	61	32°43′0″S 27°6′4″E
Settlers Dam	Grahamstown	Eastern Cape	Kariega River	1962	5,300	1.01	21	33°24′42″S 26°30′34″E
Setumo Dam	Mmabatho	North West	Molopo River	1995	19,600	4.473	17	25°51′30″S 25°30′1″E
Shongweni Dam (Ntshongweni Dam)	Hillcrest	KZN	Sterkspruit and Wekeweke Rivers	1927	2,200	0.3	39	29°51′25″S 30°43′20″E
Silvermine Dam	Cape Town	Western Cape		1898	82	0.04	9	34°4′31″S 18°23′56″E
Slangdraai Dam	Ladysmith	KZN	Sundays River	1986	10,300	2.400		28°14′24″S 29°44′58″E
Smartt Dam	Britstown	Northern Cape	Ongers River	1912	100,300	31.569		30°36′48″S 23°18′2″E
Sol Plaatje Dam (Previously Saulspoort Dam)	Bethlehem	Free State	Liebenbergsvlei River	1968	15,676	3.560	24	28°13′1″S 28°22′1″E
Spioenkop Dam	Bergville	KZN	Tugela River	1973	270,600^{[N]}	15.314	53	28°40′53″S 29°31′1″E
Spitskop Dam	Schmidtsdrift	Northern Cape	Harts River	1974	57,800	25.312	18	28°7′29″S 24°30′9″E
Spring Grove Dam	Nottingham Road	KZN	Mooi River	2013	139,300	10.2	32	29°19′23″S 29°56′38″E
Steenbras Dam (lower)	Gordons Bay	Western Cape	Steenbras River	1921	33517	3.642	37	34°11′15″S 18°51′4″E
Steenbras Upper Dam	Gordons Bay	Western Cape	Steenbras River	1977	31767^{[S]}	2.750	37	34°10′5″S 18°54′5″E
Steenbras Hydro-Electric Lower Dam	Gordons Bay	Western Cape	Sir Lowry's Pass River	1977	3,560^{[S]}	0.35	31	34°8′50″S 18°54′0″E
Sterkfontein Dam	Harrismith	Free State	Nuwejaar Spruit	1980	2,616,900^{[N]}	67.260	93	28°23′15″S 29°1′10″E
Stettynskloof Dam	Worcester	Western Cape	Holsloot River	1955	14,700^{[N]}	1.004	48	33°50′14″S 19°15′8″E
Stompdrift Dam	De Rust	Western Cape	Olifants River	1965	46,270	6.203	49	33°30′45″S 22°35′8″E
Taung Dam	Taung	North West	Harts River	1993	58,900	4.650	44	27°31′35″S 24°51′16″E
Theewaterskloof Dam	Villiersdorp	Western Cape	Riviersonderend River	1978	480188^{[N]}	51.204	38	34°4′45″S 19°17′1″E
Tierpoort Dam	Bloemfontein	Free State	Tierpoort River	1990	34,000	9.11	20	29°25′20″S 26°08′10″E
Trichardtsfontein Dam	Trichardt	Mpumalanga	Trichardt Spruit	1981	15,200	2.459	26	26°29′53″S 29°14′1″E
Tsojana Dam	Cofimvaba	Eastern Cape	Tsojana River	1978	12,340	2.360	23	31°53′0″S 27°38′1″E
Tweedraai Dam	Trichardt	Mpumalanga	Trichardt Spruit	1991	16,000	2.370	21	26°25′45″S 29°13′0″E
Tzaneen Dam (previously Fanie Botha Dam)	Tzaneen	Limpopo	Groot Letaba River	1977	157,291	11.636	50	23°47′37″S 30°9′48″E
Vaal Barrage	Vanderbijlpark	Gauteng	Vaal River	1923	56,712	13.485	10	26°45′53″S 27°41′30″E
Vaal Dam	Deneysville	Free State Gauteng	Vaal River	1939	2,603,400^{[N]}	322.755	63	26°53′1″S 28°7′20″E
Vaalharts Storage Weir	Warrenton	North West	Vaal River	1936	48,700	1.189	12	28°06′55″S 24°55′32″E
Vaalkop Dam	Beestekraal	North West	Elands River, Hex River	2010	53,500	11.1	33	25°18′37″S 27°28′33″E
Vanderkloof Dam (previously P.K. Le Roux Dam)	Petrusville	Northern Cape, Free State	Orange River	1977	3,171,300^{[N]}	133.402	108	29°59′29″S 24°43′55″E
Vanwyksvlei Dam	Vanwyksvlei	Northern Cape	Vanwyksvlei	1884	143,081	49.934	15	30°22′46″S 21°48′41″E
Victoria Dam	Cape Town	Western Cape	Disa River	1895	128	0.05	6	33°59′11″S 18°24′29″E
Voëlvlei Dam	Gouda	Western Cape	Voëlvlei Lake^{[V]}	1971	164095^{[N]}	15.730	10	33°20′15″S 19°2′1″E
Vondo Dam	Sibasa	Limpopo	Mutshundudi River	1982	30,540	2.19	47	22°56′45″S 30°20′7″E
Vygeboom Dam	Badplaas	MP	Komati River	1971	83,000^{[N]}	6.7	45	25°52′53″S 30°37′9″E
Wagendrift Dam	Estcourt	KZN	Bushmans River	1963	55,900^{[N]}	5.084	41	29°2′15″S 29°51′1″E
Waterdown Dam	Whittlesea	Eastern Cape	Klipplaat River	1958	38,400	2.608	44	32°17′15″S 26°51′1″E
Welbedacht Dam	Wepener	Free State	Caledon River	1973	10,200^{[N]}	10.185	32	29°54′34″S 26°51′37″E
Wemmershoek Dam	Franschhoek	Western Cape	Wemmers River	1957	58644^{[N]}	2.960	53	33°50′1″S 19°5′20″E
Westoe Dam	Amsterdam	Mpumalanga	Usutu River	1968	61,900	7.333	26	26°30′15″S 30°37′5″E
Witbank Dam	Witbank	Mpumalanga	Olifants River	1971	104,000^{[N]}	12.112	44	25°53′30″S 29°19′1″E
Witklip Dam	Sabie	Mpumalanga	Sand River	1969	12,970	1.875	21	25°14′10″S 30°54′1″E
Wolwedans Dam	Mossel Bay	Western Cape	Great Brak River	1990	25,530	1.100	70	34°0′51″S 22°13′44″E
Woodhead Dam	Cape Town	Western Cape	Disa River	1897	954	0.16	38	33°58′38″S 18°24′8″E
Woodstock Dam	Bergville	KZN	Tugela River	1983	373,300^{[N]}	29.129	49	28°45′31″S 29°14′46″E
Wriggleswade Dam	Stutterheim	Eastern Cape	Kubusi River	1991	93,200	10.000	35	32°34′1″S 27°35′0″E
Xilinxa Dam	Idutywa	Eastern Cape	Xilinxa River	1972	13,900	2.81	25	32°08′32″S 28°05′57″E
Xonxa Dam	Queenstown	Eastern Cape	White Kei River	1974	115,900^{[N]}	12.881	49	31°51′0″S 27°11′13″E
Zaaihoek Dam	Wakkerstroom	Mpumalanga	Slang River	1988	184,600^{[N]}	12.446	46	27°26′1″S 30°4′30″E

- N Nett or working capacity
- G Gross or maximum capacity
- I The Bedford and Bramhoek dams form part of the Ingula Pumped Storage Scheme
- D The Driekloof and Kilburn dams form part of the Drakensberg Pumped Storage Scheme
- P The Kogelberg and Rockview dams form part of the Palmiet Pumped Storage Scheme
- S The Steenbras Dam – Upper and Steenbras Hydro-Electric Lower Dam form part of the Steenbras Pumped Storage Scheme
- V The Voëlvlei Dam is an off-channel reservoir supplied by canals from the Klein Berg River, Leeu River and Vier-en-Twintig River, and discharging by canal into the Great Berg River.

== See also ==
- Water supply and sanitation in South Africa
- List of lakes of South Africa
- List of rivers of South Africa
- List of dams and reservoirs
- List of waterfalls in South Africa
- List of waterways
- Transvasement
- Water Management Areas, also known as WMA's.
