= Tweedraai Dam =

- Interactive map of Tweedraai Dam
- Official name: Tweedraai Dam
- Location: Mpumalanga, South Africa
- Coordinates: 26°25′45″S 29°13′0″E
- Opening date: 1991
- Operators: Department of Water Affairs and Forestry

Dam and spillways
- Type of dam: earth-fill
- Impounds: Trichardtspruit
- Height: 20 metres (66 ft)
- Length: 1,100 metres (3,600 ft)

Reservoir
- Creates: Tweedraai Dam Reservoir
- Total capacity: 18×10^{6} m^{3} (640×10^{6} cu ft)
- Catchment area: 61 km^{2} (24 sq mi)
- Surface area: 237 hectares (590 acres)

Tweedraai Dam is an earth-fill type dam located on the Trichardtspruit near Trichardt, Mpumalanga, South Africa. It was established in 1991 and serves primarily for flood control purposes. The hazard potential of the dam has been ranked high (3).

== See also ==
- List of reservoirs and dams in South Africa
- List of rivers of South Africa
