= Smartt Dam =

South African dam

- Interactive map of Smartt Dam
- Official name: Smartt Dam
- Location: Northern Cape, South Africa
- Coordinates: 30°37′45″S 23°18′16″E
- Opening date: 1908
- Operator: Smartt Irrigation Board

Dam and spillways
- Type of dam: earth-fill
- Impounds: Ongers River
- Height: 21 metres (69 ft)
- Length: 1,806 metres (5,925 ft)

Reservoir
- Creates: Smartt Dam Reservoir
- Total capacity: 100,300,000 cubic metres (3.54×10^{9} cu ft)
- Surface area: 3,156.9 hectares (7,801 acres)

Smartt Dam is an earth-fill type dam located on the Ongers River near Britstown, Northern Cape, South Africa. It was established in 1908(rebuilt in 1963 after severe floods) and serves mainly for irrigation purposes. The hazard potential of the dam has been ranked high (3).

== See also ==
- List of reservoirs and dams in South Africa
- List of rivers of South Africa
