= Douglas Weir =

- Interactive map of Douglas Weir
- Official name: Douglas Weir
- Location: Northern Cape, South Africa
- Coordinates: 29°4′1″S 23°50′1″E
- Opening date: 1977
- Operators: Department of Water Affairs and Forestry

Dam and spillways
- Impounds: Vaal River
- Height: 10 m
- Length: 1063 m

Reservoir
- Creates: Douglas Weir Reservoir
- Total capacity: 16 700 000 m³
- Surface area: 799 ha

Douglas Weir is a dam on the Vaal River, near Douglas, Northern Cape, South Africa. It was established in 1896 and raised in 1977.

== See also ==
- List of reservoirs and dams in South Africa
- List of rivers of South Africa
