= De Hoop Dam =

- Interactive map of De Hoop Dam
- Official name: De Hoop Dam
- Location: Eastern Cape, South Africa
- Coordinates: 32°27′5″S 24°25′23.6″E
- Opening date: 1938
- Operators: Department of Water Affairs and Forestry

Dam and spillways
- Impounds: Kamdeboo River
- Height: 21 m
- Length: 128 m

Reservoir
- Creates: De Hoop Dam Reservoir
- Total capacity: 16 500 000 m³

De Hoop Dam is a dam on the Kamdeboo River, near Graaff-Reinet, Eastern Cape, South Africa. It was established in 1938 and its primary purpose is for irrigation.

== See also ==
- List of reservoirs and dams in South Africa
- List of rivers of South Africa
