= Trichardtsfontein Dam =

- Interactive map of Trichardtsfontein Dam
- Official name: Trichardtsfontein Dam
- Location: Mpumalanga, South Africa
- Coordinates: 26°29′53″S 29°14′1″E
- Opening date: 1981
- Operators: Department of Water Affairs and Forestry

Dam and spillways
- Type of dam: earth-fill
- Impounds: Trichardtspruit
- Height: 24 metres (79 ft)
- Length: 1,240 metres (4,070 ft)

Reservoir
- Creates: Trichardtsfontein Dam Reservoir
- Total capacity: 15,200,000 cubic metres (540,000,000 cu ft)
- Catchment area: 15 km^{2}
- Surface area: 245.9 hectares (608 acres)

Trichardtsfontein Dam is an earth-fill type dam located on the Trichardtspruit near Trichardt, Mpumalanga, South Africa. It was established in 1981 and serves mainly for municipal and industrial water supply purposes. The hazard potential of the dam has been ranked high.

== See also ==
- List of reservoirs and dams in South Africa
- List of rivers of South Africa
