= Vanwyksvlei =

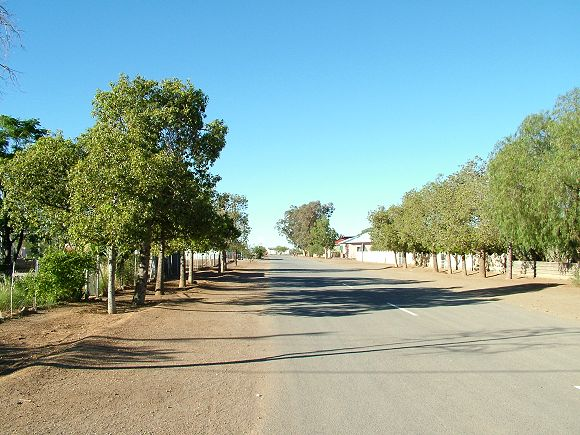
- A road in Vanwyksvlei

- Location within Northern Cape Location within South Africa
- Coordinates: 30°21′S 21°49′E
- Country: South Africa
- Province: Northern Cape
- District: Pixley ka Seme
- Municipality: Kareeberg

Area
  - Total: 2.66 km^{2} (1.03 sq mi)

Population (2011)
  - Total: 1,721
  - Density: 647/km^{2} (1,680/sq mi)

Racial makeup (2011)
  - Black African: 2.3%
  - Coloured: 92.5%
  - Indian/Asian: 0.9%
  - White: 4.0%
  - Other: 0.3%

First languages (2011)
  - Afrikaans: 97.7%
  - Other: 2.3%
- Time zone: UTC+2 (SAST)
- Postal code (street): 8922
- PO box: 8922

Vanwyksvlei or Van Wyk's Vlei (Afrikaans for Van Wyk's Marsh) is a small town in the Northern Cape, South Africa.

== Name ==
The town is named after a farmer called Van Wyk, and the Afrikaans suffix vlei, meaning 'pond', 'marsh'. However, it is one of the driest places in South Africa, and the surrounding region is named the Dorsland (Afrikaans for Thirstland).

== History ==
Vanwyksvlei was founded in 1881. It later saw action in the Second Boer War where two Victoria Crosses were awarded; Harry Hampton and Henry Knight were awarded the medal for gallant acts.

== Vanwyksvlei Dam ==
The Vanwyksvlei Dam was the first (1882) state-funded dam built in South Africa.

== See also ==
- Vanwyksvlei Dam
