= Kromfontein Middle Cofferdam =

- Interactive map of Kromfontein Middle Cofferdam
- Official name: Kromfontein Middle Cofferdam
- Location: Mpumalanga, South Africa
- Coordinates: 26°7′0″S 29°15′0″E
- Opening date: 1990
- Operators: Department of Water Affairs and Forestry

Dam and spillways
- Type of dam: earthfill
- Impounds: Steenkool Spruit
- Height: 14 m
- Length: 610 m

Reservoir
- Creates: Kromfontein Middle Reservoir
- Total capacity: 18 000 000 m³
- Surface area: 40 ha

Kromfontein Middle Cofferdam is an earthfill type dam located on the Steenkool Spruit, near Witbank, Mpumalanga, South Africa. It was established in 1990 and serves primarily for flood storage (retention) and river diversion. The hazard potential of the dam has been ranked significant (2).

== See also ==
- List of reservoirs and dams in South Africa
- List of rivers of South Africa
