= Hazelmere Dam =

- Interactive map of Hazelmere Dam
- Official name: Hazelmere Dam
- Location: Kwazulu Natal, South Africa
- Coordinates: 29°36′00″S 31°2′30″E
- Opening date: 1977
- Operators: Department of Water Affairs and Forestry

Dam and spillways
- Type of dam: concrete gravity
- Impounds: Mdloti River
- Height: 44 m
- Length: 478 m

Reservoir
- Creates: Hazelmere Dam Reservoir
- Total capacity: 37 133 000 m^{3}
- Catchment area: 376 km^{2}
- Surface area: 189.9 ha

Hazelmere Dam is a combined concrete gravity type dam located on the Mdloti River, Kwazulu Natal, South Africa. It was established in 1977 and its primary purpose is to serve for irrigation and domestic use. The hazard potential of the dam assembly has been ranked high (3).

== See also ==
- List of reservoirs and dams in South Africa
- List of rivers of South Africa
