= Kettingspruit Dam =

- Interactive map of Kettingspruit Dam
- Official name: Kettingspruit Dam
- Location: Mpumalanga, South Africa
- Coordinates: 24°10′0″S 30°31′0″E
- Opening date: 2006
- Operators: Department of Water Affairs and Forestry

Dam and spillways
- Impounds: tributary of the Ketting Spruit

Reservoir
- Creates: Kettingspruit Dam Reservoir
- Total capacity: 70 000 000 m³

Kettingspruit Dam is a dam on a tributary of the Ketting Spruit, Mpumalanga, South Africa. It was established in 2006.

== See also ==
- List of reservoirs and dams in South Africa
- List of rivers of South Africa
