= De Beer's Pass (Eastern Cape) =

Mountain pass in South Africa

Coordinates: 32°18′53.8″S 26°11′08.7″E

De Beer's Pass is located in the Eastern Cape province of South Africa. It is situated on an unmarked road between the settlements of Cookhouse and Tarkastad.
