= Armenia Dam =

- Interactive map of Armenia Dam
- Official name: Armenia Dam
- Country: South Africa
- Location: Hobhouse, Free State
- Coordinates: 29°22′15″S 27°8′1″E
- Purpose: Irrigation
- Opening date: 1954
- Owner: Department of Water Affairs

Dam and spillways
- Type of dam: Earth fill dam
- Impounds: Leeu River (Mohokare)
- Height: 22 m (72 ft)
- Length: 110 m (360 ft)

Reservoir
- Creates: Armenia Dam Reservoir
- Total capacity: 13,000 m^{3} (460,000 cu ft)
- Surface area: 393 ha (970 acres)

Armenia Dam is a dam across the Leeu River, near Hobhouse, Free State province, South Africa. It was established in 1954. It has a capacity of 13,000 cubic metres (460,000 cu ft), and a surface area of 3.933 square kilometres (1.519 sq mi), the wall is 22 metres (72 ft) high.

== See also ==
- List of reservoirs and dams in South Africa
- List of rivers in South Africa
