= Goedertrouw Dam =

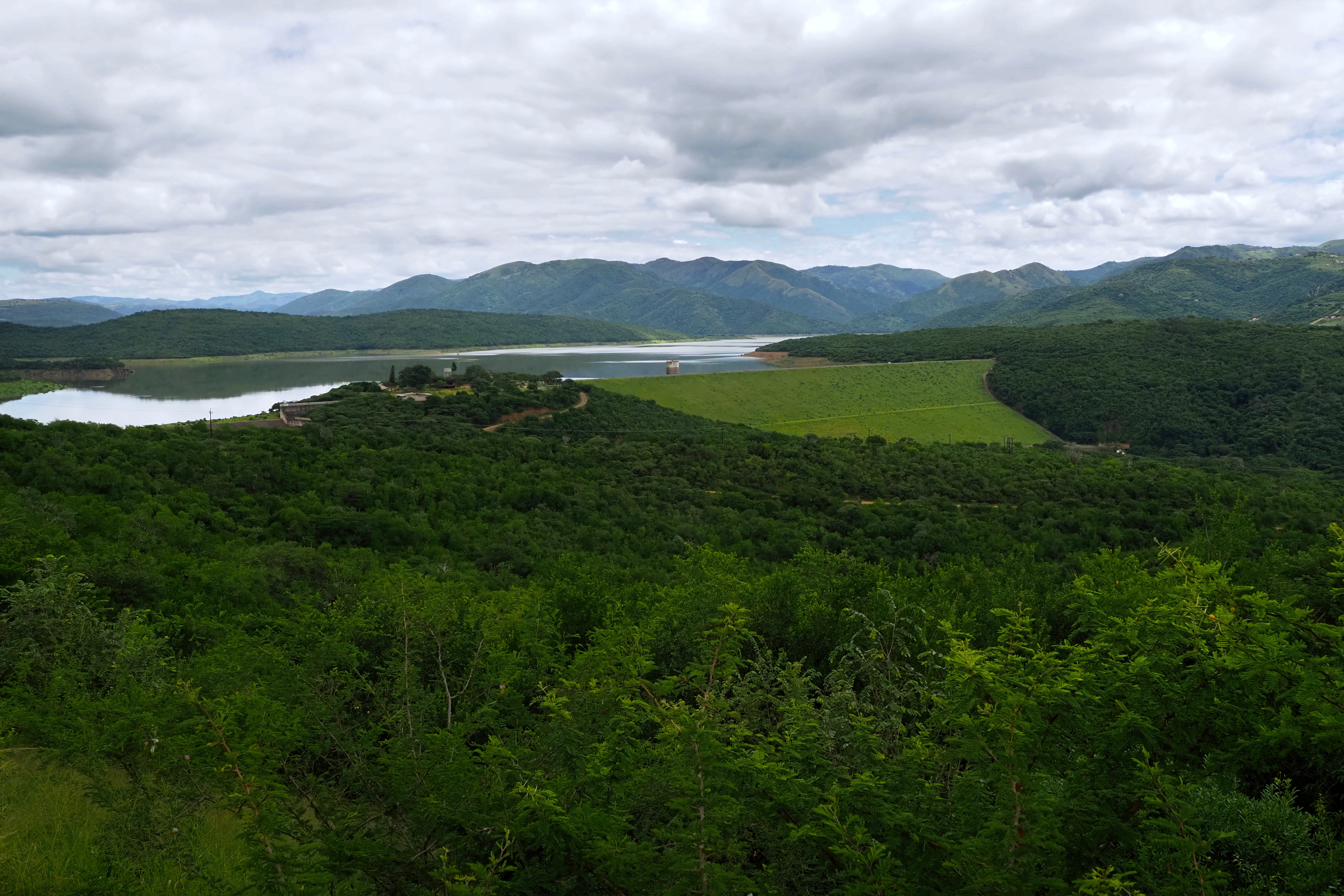
- Interactive map of Goedertrouw Dam
- Official name: Goedertrouw Dam
- Location: KwaZulu-Natal, South Africa
- Coordinates: 28°45′52″S 31°25′46″E
- Construction began: 1980
- Opening date: 1982
- Operators: Department of Water Affairs and Forestry

Dam and spillways
- Type of dam: earth-fill
- Height: 88 m
- Length: 660 m

Reservoir
- Creates: Goedertrouw Dam Reservoir
- Total capacity: 301 000 000 m³
- Catchment area: 1270 km^{2}
- Surface area: 1200 ha

Goedertrouw Dam is an earth-filled dam in South Africa. The dam was constructed on the Mhlathuze River, near Eshowe, KwaZulu-Natal, in 1980 (commissioned in 1982). It currently has a capacity of 301 million m^{3}. It is principally for the provision of water to the industrial complex at Richards Bay. It also serves as a reservoir for irrigation and domestic use. The hazard potential of the dam has been ranked high (3).

== See also ==
- List of reservoirs and dams in South Africa
- List of rivers of South Africa
