= Roode Els Berg Dam =

Coordinates: 33°26′7.91″S 19°34′6.96″E

Roode Elsberg Dam
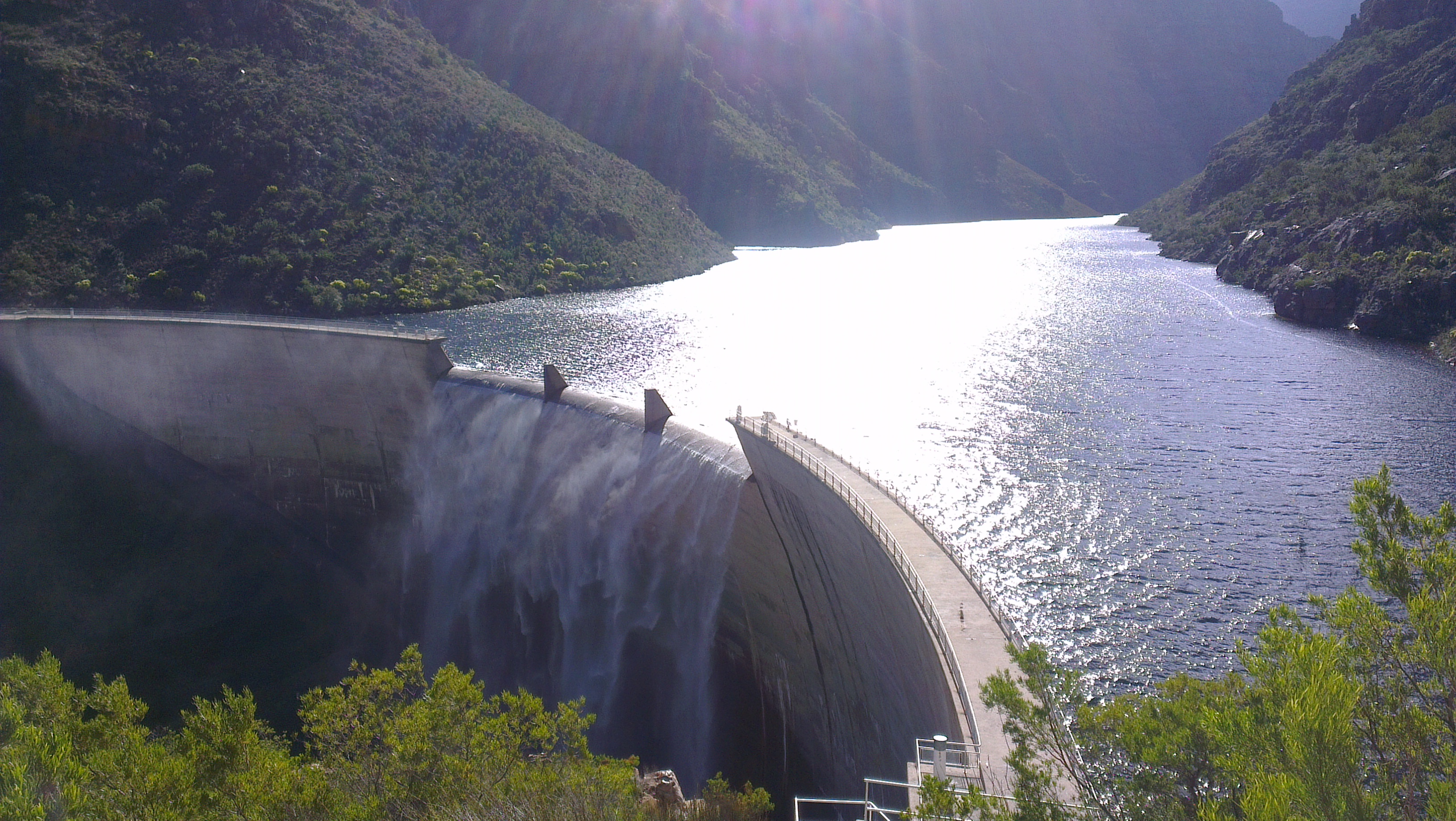
- Interactive map of Roode Elsberg Dam
- Location: Sanddriftkloof Hex Valley De Doorns South Africa

Roode Elsberg Dam is a dam in South Africa and located on the Sanddrift River, some 10 km north west of the town of De Doorns in the Western Cape. The catchment is medium-sized (139 km^{2}) and the dam functions primarily as storage for domestic and irrigation use. The dam completed in 1969, was designed, built and is owned by the Department of Water Affairs and operated by the Hex Valley Water Users Association. The dam wall is a double curvature arch dam with an uncontrolled ogee spillway in the river section. An apron is provided at the toe of the spillway. A gallery system of two interconnected galleries in the dam body itself as well as five galleries into the foundation (two on the left and three on the right flank) provide drainage and pressure relief to the dam.

The main outlet works of the dam consists of an inlet structure on the left bank upstream of the dam wall. The inlet is controlled by a service gate. From the inlet a 1 890 mm diameter tunnel leads to a control room 91.44 m downstream of the inlet. The control room is accessed by a tunnel from the left bank downstream of the dam wall. In the control room the water flows through a 1 219 mm steel pipe.

== General ==
- Owner: Department of Water Affairs
- Designer: Department of Water Affairs
- Type: Double curvature arch dam
- Built by: Department of Water Affairs
- Completion date: 1969
- Purpose: Irrigation and domestic use
- Classification: Category 3
- Capacity 7.73 x 10.6 m3

== Concrete arch ==
- Spillway type: Uncontrolled ogee
- Non-overspill crest level: RL 577.492 m
- Full supply level: RL 572.92 m
- Freeboard between NOC and FSL: 7.572 m
- Height above riverbed: 65.53 m
- Effective crest length of spillway: 74.371 m
- Capacity of spillway: 1 659 m3/s

== See also ==
- List of reservoirs and dams in South Africa
