= Lakenvallei Dam =

- Interactive map of Lakenvallei Dam
- Official name: Lakenvallei Dam
- Location: Western Cape, South Africa
- Coordinates: 33°22′1″S 19°34′1″E
- Opening date: 1974
- Operators: Department of Water Affairs and Forestry

Dam and spillways
- Type of dam: gravity & arch
- Impounds: Sanddrifskloof River
- Height: 56 m
- Length: 268 m

Reservoir
- Creates: Lakenvallei Dam Reservoir
- Total capacity: 10 300 000 m^{3}
- Surface area: 83 ha

Lakenvallei Dam is a combined gravity & arch type dam located on Sanddrifskloof River, near Ceres, Western Cape, South Africa. It was established in 1974 it serves mainly for irrigation purposes. The hazard potential of the dam has been ranked high (3).

== See also ==
- List of reservoirs and dams in South Africa
- List of rivers of South Africa
