= Buffeljags Dam =

- Interactive map of Buffeljags Dam
- Official name: Buffeljags Dam
- Country: South Africa
- Location: near Swellendam, Western Cape
- Coordinates: 34°00′37.1″S 20°33′11.8″E
- Purpose: Irrigation
- Opening date: 1967
- Owner: Department of Water Affairs

Dam and spillways
- Type of dam: Combination gravity and earth fill dam
- Impounds: Buffeljags River
- Height: 24 m
- Length: 335 m

Reservoir
- Creates: Buffeljags Dam Reservoir
- Total capacity: 5 200 000 m^{3}
- Surface area: 129 ha

Buffeljags Dam is a gravity/earth-fill type dam on the Buffeljags River, near Swellendam, Western Cape, South Africa. It was established in 1967 and renovated in 1983. Its primary purpose today is for irrigation use.

== See also ==
- List of reservoirs and dams in South Africa
- List of rivers of South Africa
