= Rustfontein Dam =

- Interactive map of Rustfontein Dam
- Official name: Rustfontein Dam
- Location: Free State, South Africa
- Coordinates: 29°16′15″S 26°37′1″E
- Opening date: 1955
- Operators: Department of Water Affairs and Forestry

Dam and spillways
- Type of dam: gravity
- Impounds: Modder River
- Height: 33.4 metres (110 ft)
- Length: 182 metres (597 ft)

Reservoir
- Creates: Rustfontein Dam Reservoir
- Total capacity: 72,200,000 cubic metres (2.55×10^{9} cu ft)
- Catchment area: 937 km^{2}
- Surface area: 1,158.5 hectares (2,863 acres)

Rustfontein Dam is a gravity type dam located on the Modder River near Botshabelo, Free State, South Africa. It was established in 1955 and serves mainly for domestic supply and industrial purposes. Its hazard potential has been ranked high (3).

== See also ==
- List of reservoirs and dams in South Africa
- List of rivers of South Africa
