= Elandskloof Dam =

- Interactive map of Elandskloof Dam
- Official name: Elandskloof Dam
- Country: South Africa
- Location: Villiersdorp, Western Cape
- Coordinates: 33°57′1″S 19°17′1″E
- Purpose: Irrigation and domestic
- Opening date: 1976
- Owner: Department of Water Affairs

Dam and spillways
- Type of dam: Gravity dam
- Impounds: Elandskloof River
- Height: 65 m
- Length: 165 m

Reservoir
- Creates: Elandskloof Dam Reservoir
- Total capacity: 11 500 000 m³
- Catchment area: 50 km^{2}
- Surface area: 70 ha

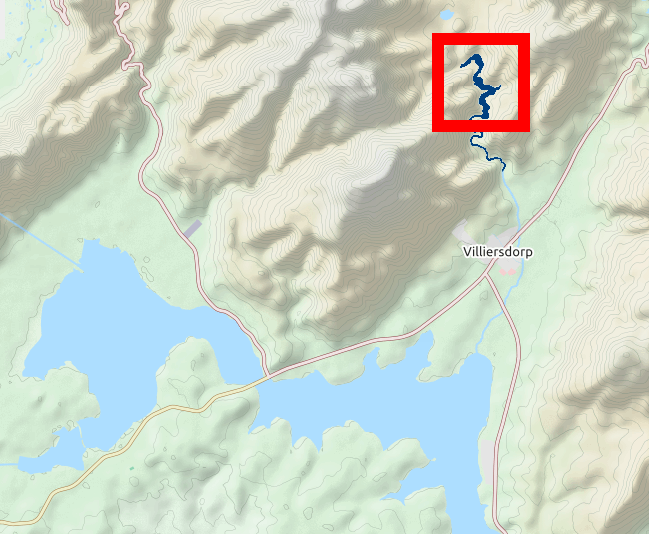

Elandskloof Dam is a gravity type dam located on the Elandskloof River, near Villiersdorp, Western Cape, South Africa. It was established in 1976. The primary purpose of the dam is for irrigation and domestic water supply. Its hazard potential has been ranked high (3).

This dam flows into the Theewaterskloof Dam, which is a major supplier of household water to the city of Cape Town.

== See also ==
- List of reservoirs and dams in South Africa
- List of rivers of South Africa
