= Eikenhof Dam =

- Interactive map of Eikenhof Dam
- Official name: Eikenhof Dam
- Location: Western Cape, South Africa
- Coordinates: 34°7′46″S 19°2′5″E
- Opening date: 1977
- Operators: Department of Water Affairs and Forestry

Dam and spillways
- Type of dam: earth-fill
- Impounds: Palmiet River
- Height: 47 m
- Length: 300 m

Reservoir
- Creates: Eikenhof Dam Reservoir
- Total capacity: 29 000 000 m³
- Surface area: 270 ha

Eikenhof Dam is an earth-fill type dam on the Palmiet River, near Grabouw, Western Cape, South Africa. It was established in 1977. The primary purpose of the dam is for irrigation use and its hazard potential has been ranked high (3).

== See also ==
- List of reservoirs and dams in South Africa
- List of rivers of South Africa
