= Brandvlei Dam =

- Interactive map of Brandvlei Dam
- Official name: Brandvlei Dam
- Country: South Africa
- Location: Western Cape
- Coordinates: 33°42′45″S 19°24′57″E
- Purpose: Irrigation
- Opening date: 1983
- Owner: Department of Water Affairs

Dam and spillways
- Type of dam: Earth fill dam
- Impounds: Lower Brandvlei River

Reservoir
- Creates: Brandvlei Dam Reservoir
- Total capacity: 303.800.000 m^{3}

Brandvlei Dam is an earth-fill type dam on the Lower Brandvlei River in the Western Cape, South Africa. It was completed in 1983 and its inlet is the Holsloot River.

== See also ==
- List of reservoirs and dams in South Africa
- List of rivers of South Africa
