= Pietersfontein Dam =

- Interactive map of Pietersfontein Dam
- Official name: Pietersfontein Dam
- Country: South Africa
- Location: Western Cape
- Coordinates: 33°39′58″S 20°00′59″E
- Purpose: Irrigation
- Opening date: 1968
- Owner: Department of Water Affairs

Dam and spillways
- Type of dam: Arch dam
- Impounds: Keisies River
- Height: 25 m
- Length: 162 m

Reservoir
- Creates: Pietersfontein Dam Reservoir
- Total capacity: 2 028 000 m^{3}
- Catchment area: 115 km^{2}
- Surface area: 32.5 ha

Pietersfontein Dam is an arch type dam located on the Keisies River in Western Cape Province, South Africa. It was created in 1968 and serves mainly for irrigation purposes. Its hazard potential has been ranked high (3).

== See also ==
- List of reservoirs and dams in South Africa
