= Vanwyksvlei Dam =

- Location: South Africa
- Coordinates: 30.401293°S 21.800385°E

Vanwyksvlei Dam is a dam in South Africa. It was established in 1884.

== See also ==
- List of reservoirs and dams in South Africa
