= De Beer's Pass, KwaZulu-Natal =

Mountain pass

De Beer's Pass
- Location within KwaZulu-Natal
- Elevation: 1,720 metres (5,640 ft)

Third Approach
- Location: Between Ladysmith and Harrismith, South Africa
- Coordinates: 28°19′2.8″S 29°29′57.4″E

De Beer's Pass is located in the KwaZulu-Natal province of South Africa. It is situated on an unmarked road between Ladysmith and Harrismith (labelled as S61 on Google Maps) in the neighbouring Free State province.

== N3 realignment ==
A proposal was made to reroute the nearby N3 national road over De Beer's Pass. The proposed new alignment would shorten the route between Durban and Johannesburg by 14 kilometres (8.7 mi) and have a more gentle gradient (easier route for trucks) than the existing Van Reenen's Pass.

In March 2017, SANRAL decided that the construction of the De Beer's Pass Route for the N3 will not continue, as it would have disturbed the economies of Harrismith and Van Reenen.
