= Stettynskloof Dam =

- Location within Western Cape
- Official name: Stettynskloof Dam
- Country: South Africa
- Location: Western Cape
- Coordinates: 33°50′00″S 19°15′05″E
- Opening date: 1981

Dam and spillways
- Type of dam: earth-fill, rock-fill
- Impounds: Stettynskloof River
- Height: 48 m (157 ft)
- Length: 250 m (820 ft)

Reservoir
- Total capacity: 15 000 000 m^{3}
- Catchment area: 55 km^{2}
- Surface area: 90 ha

Stettynskloof Dam is a combined earth-fill/rock-fill type dam located on the Stettynskloof River in South Africa. It serves mainly for municipal and industrial use and its hazard potential has been ranked high (3).

== See also ==
- List of reservoirs and dams in South Africa
