= Keerom Dam =

- Interactive map of Keerom Dam
- Official name: Keerom Dam
- Location: Western Cape, South Africa
- Coordinates: 33°34′4″S 19°42′8″E
- Opening date: 1954 (renovated 1989)
- Operators: Department of Water Affairs and Forestry

Dam and spillways
- Type of dam: arch
- Impounds: Nuy River
- Height: 38 m
- Length: 105 m

Reservoir
- Creates: Keerom Dam Reservoir
- Total capacity: 9 110 000 m³
- Catchment area: 392 km^{2}
- Surface area: 90.2 ha

Keerom Dam is an arch type dam located on the Nuy River, near Worcester, Western Cape, South Africa. It was established in 1954 and has been renovated in 1989. The primary purpose of the dam is to serve for irrigation and its hazard potential has been ranked high (3).

== See also ==
- List of reservoirs and dams in South Africa
- List of rivers of South Africa
