= Poortjieskloof Dam =

- Interactive map of Poortjieskloof Dam
- Official name: Poortjieskloof Dam
- Location: Western Cape, South Africa
- Coordinates: 33°51′29″S 20°22′16″E
- Opening date: 1955 (renovated in 1968)
- Operators: Department of Water Affairs and Forestry

Dam and spillways
- Type of dam: double curvature arch
- Impounds: Groot River
- Height: 33.5 m
- Length: 144 m

Reservoir
- Creates: Poortjieskloof Dam Reservoir
- Total capacity: 9 680 000 m^{3}
- Catchment area: 94 km^{2}
- Surface area: 305 ha

Poortjieskloof Dam is a double curvature arch type dam in the Groot River in Western Cape, South Africa. It was created in 1955 and renovated in 1968.

== See also ==
- List of reservoirs and dams in South Africa
