= Kwaggaskloof Dam =

- Interactive map of Kwaggaskloof Dam
- Official name: Kwaggaskloof Dam
- Location: Western Cape, South Africa
- Coordinates: 33°46′6″S 19°26′4″E
- Opening date: 1975
- Operator: Department of Water Affairs

Dam and spillways
- Impounds: Wabooms River
- Height: 18 m
- Length: 933 m

Reservoir
- Creates: Kwaggaskloof Dam Reservoir
- Total capacity: 173 900 000 m³
- Surface area: 1 688 ha

Kwaggaskloof Dam is a dam on the Wabooms River, near Worcester, Western Cape, South Africa. It was established in 1975.

== See also ==
- List of reservoirs and dams in South Africa
- List of rivers of South Africa
