= Madikwe =

- Location within North West (South African province) Location within South Africa
- Coordinates: 25.355°S 26.530°E
- Country: South Africa
- Province: North West
- District: Bojanala Platinum
- Municipality: Moses Kotane

Area
  - Total: 1.45 km^{2} (0.56 sq mi)

Population (2011)
  - Total: 3,623
  - Density: 2,500/km^{2} (6,470/sq mi)

Racial makeup (2011)
  - Black African: 99.1%
  - Indian/Asian: 0.4%
  - White: 0.2%
  - Other: 0.3%

First languages (2011)
  - Tswana: 89.7%
  - English: 4.1%
  - Zulu: 1.8%
  - S. Ndebele: 1.1%
  - Other: 3.2%
- Time zone: UTC+2 (SAST)
- Postal code (street): 2840
- PO box: 2840
- Area code: 014

Madikwe is a town in Bojanala District Municipality in the North West province of South Africa.
