= Amsterdam, South Africa =

Amsterdam eMvelo
- Location within Mpumalanga Location within South Africa
- Coordinates: 26.617°S 30.667°E
- Country: South Africa
- Province: Mpumalanga
- District: Gert Sibande
- Municipality: Mkhondo

Area
  - Total: 8.13 km^{2} (3.14 sq mi)
- Elevation: 1,230 m (4,040 ft)

Population (2011)
  - Total: 6,769
  - Density: 833/km^{2} (2,160/sq mi)

Racial makeup (2011)
  - Black African: 90.4%
  - Coloured: 0.8%
  - Indian/Asian: 0.4%
  - White: 7.4%
  - Other: 0.9%

First languages (2011)
  - Zulu: 78.6%
  - Afrikaans: 8.0%
  - Swazi: 6.2%
  - English: 2.1%
  - Other: 5.1%
- Time zone: UTC+2 (SAST)
- Postal code (street): 2375
- PO box: n/a
- Area code: 017

Amsterdam, renamed eMvelo in 2019, is a small town located in Mkhondo Local Municipality, Mpumalanga South Africa. eMvelo encompasses a large Swazi population as a result of its proximity to the Eswatini border which is relatively close to the area. The town is located some 77 km east of Ermelo. There are large plantations of gum, pine and wattle trees in the area. The town also boasts of a peaceful community with rich culture and heritage.

== History ==
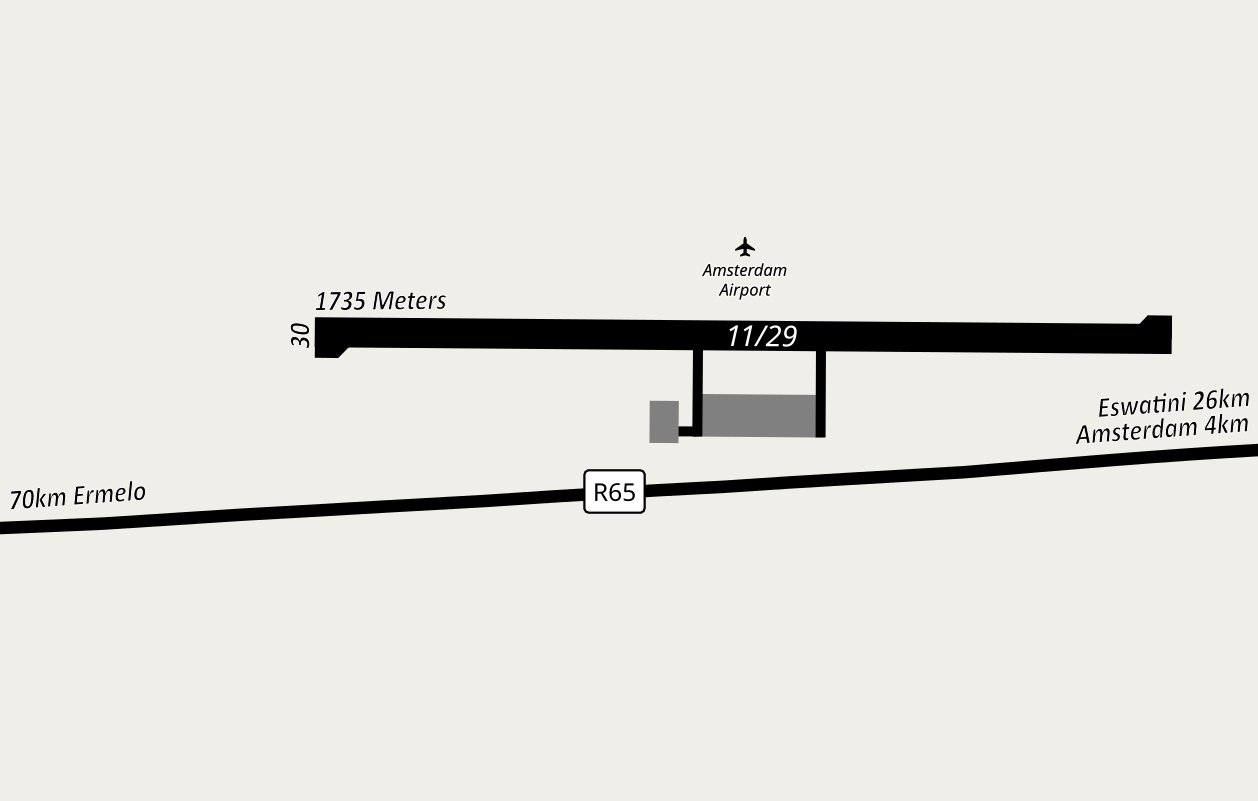
Amsterdam, Mpumalanga Airport, sometimes used as a drag racing track

Part of a Scottish settlement established by Alexander McCorkindale in 1868, it was proclaimed a town in June 1881. At first called Roburnia, in honour of Scottish Poet Robert Burns, the name was changed on 5 July 1882 to Amsterdam, after the Dutch city where the State Secretary, Eduard Bok, was born, and out of gratitude for Dutch sympathy during the First Anglo-Boer War (1880–1881). In 2019 the name of the town was changed again to eMvelo, a Swazi word meaning "In Nature"
