= Department of Water and Sanitation =

Department of the South African government

- List: 10 other official names: Departement van Waterwese en Bosbou (Afrikaans); umNyango wezaManzi namaHlathi (Southern Ndebele); iSebe lezaManzi namaHlathi (Xhosa); uMnyango Wezamanzi Namahlathi (Zulu); Litiko Letemanti Netemahlatsi (Swazi); Kgoro ya Merero ya Meetse le Kagodikgwa (Northern Sotho); Lefapha la Merero ya Metsi le Meru (Sotho); Lefapha la Merero ya Metsi le Dikgwa (Tswana); Ndzawulo ya Timhaka ta Mati ni Swihlahla (Tsonga); Muhasho wa zwa Maḓi na Maḓaka (Venda)

Department overview
- Formed: 1912; 114 years ago (as the Department of Irrigation in the Union of South Africa)
- Jurisdiction: Government of South Africa
- Annual budget: R 18.555 billion (2022/23)
- Minister responsible: Pemmy Majodina, Minister of Water Affairs and Sanitation
- Deputy Minister responsible: Jack Bloom, Deputy Minister of Water and Sanitation
- Department executive: Margaret-Ann Diedricks, Director-General: Water Affairs
- Website: https://www.dws.gov.za/

The Department of Water and Sanitation is one of the departments of the South African government. It is responsible for the state of water and sanitation in South Africa.

In May 2009, following the election of Jacob Zuma, the Department of Water Affairs and Forestry was divided, with the forestry responsibility being transferred to the Department of Agriculture, Forestry and Fisheries. The Department of Water and Sanitation was established in May 2014 by President Jacob Zuma with former Gauteng Premier Nomvula Mokonyane becoming the first Minister (26 May 2014 – 28 January 2018). She was replaced by Gugile Nkwinti.

== Corruption and incapacitation ==
The department has developed a reputation for fraud, corruption and procurement irregularities. The 2019/20 financial year report noted R10-billion had been squandered by the department, and the 2020–21 financial report has found another R10-billion in irregular expenditure. As a result of this widespread, large-scale and persistent financial ill-discipline, the department has stated it cannot fund necessary water infrastructure projects. A report by Corruption Watch and the Water Integrity Network in 2020 noted that corruption in the Department of Water and Sanitation exacerbates water shortages in South Africa, as are currently happening in the Eastern Cape.

== Water security ==
In 2022, the department revealed that almost all municipalities had ageing and dysfunctional water infrastructure. Poor maintenance and operations at local government level caused an average 40% (26%-60%) of water to be lost before it reached end users.
