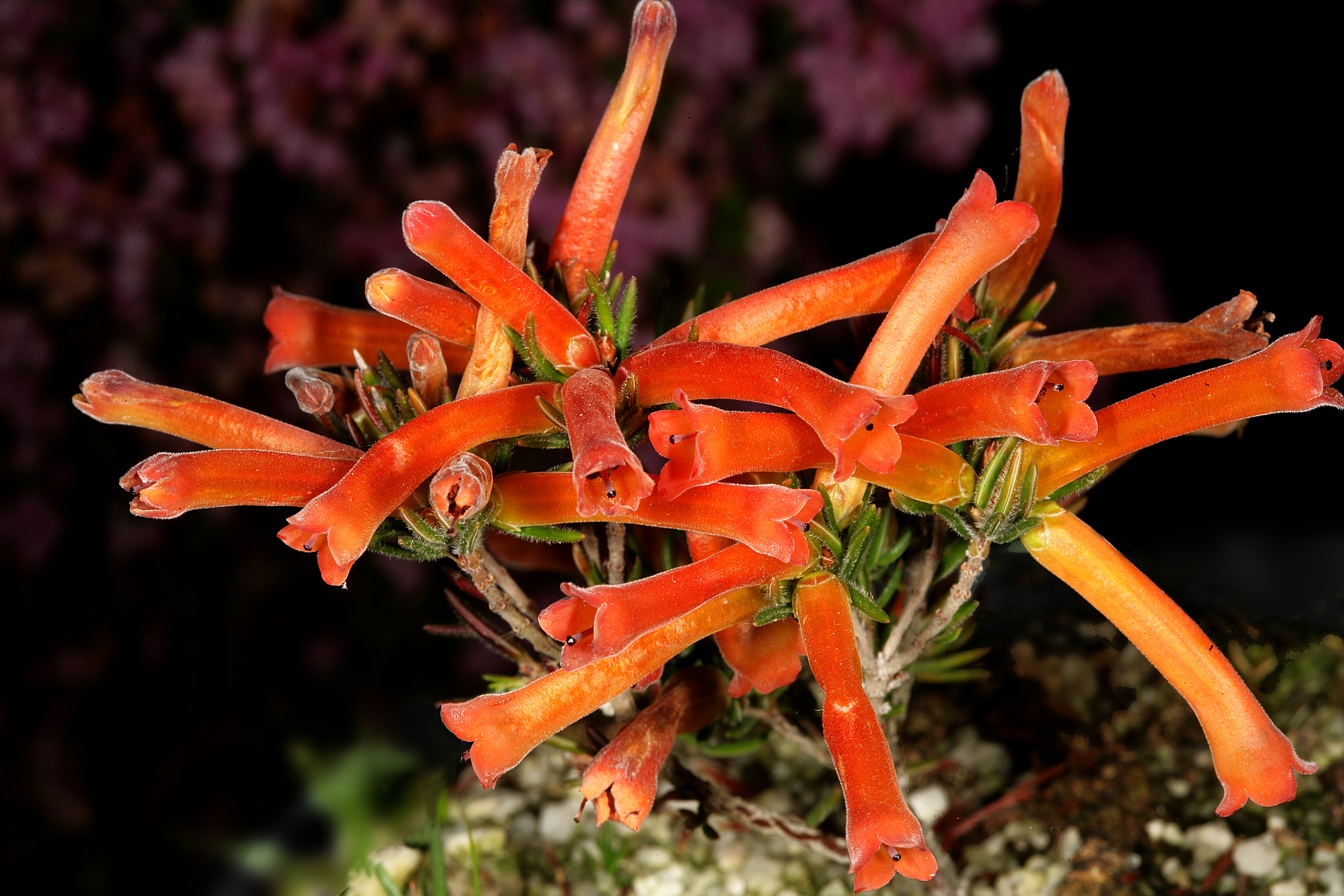

Scientific classification
- Kingdom: Plantae
- Clade: Tracheophytes
- Clade: Angiosperms
- Clade: Eudicots
- Clade: Asterids
- Order: Ericales
- Family: Ericaceae
- Genus: Erica
- Species: E. viridimontana

Binomial name
- Erica viridimontana E.G.H.Oliv. & I.M.Oliv.

= Erica viridimontana =

Species of flowering plant

Erica viridimontana is a plant belonging to the genus Erica and is part of the fynbos. The species is endemic to the Western Cape and occurs in the Groenland mountains, east of Grabouw. There is only one population, with less than 250 plants, occurring in an area of less than 7 km^{2}. The habitat has been reduced due to the high incidence of veldfires and is also threatened by invasive plants such as hakea and pinus species.

The plant has one subspecies: Erica viridimontana subsp. nivicola E.G.H.Oliv. & I.M.Oliv.
