= Palmiet Pumped Storage Scheme =

Pumped storage hydroelectric plant in the Western Cape, South Africa

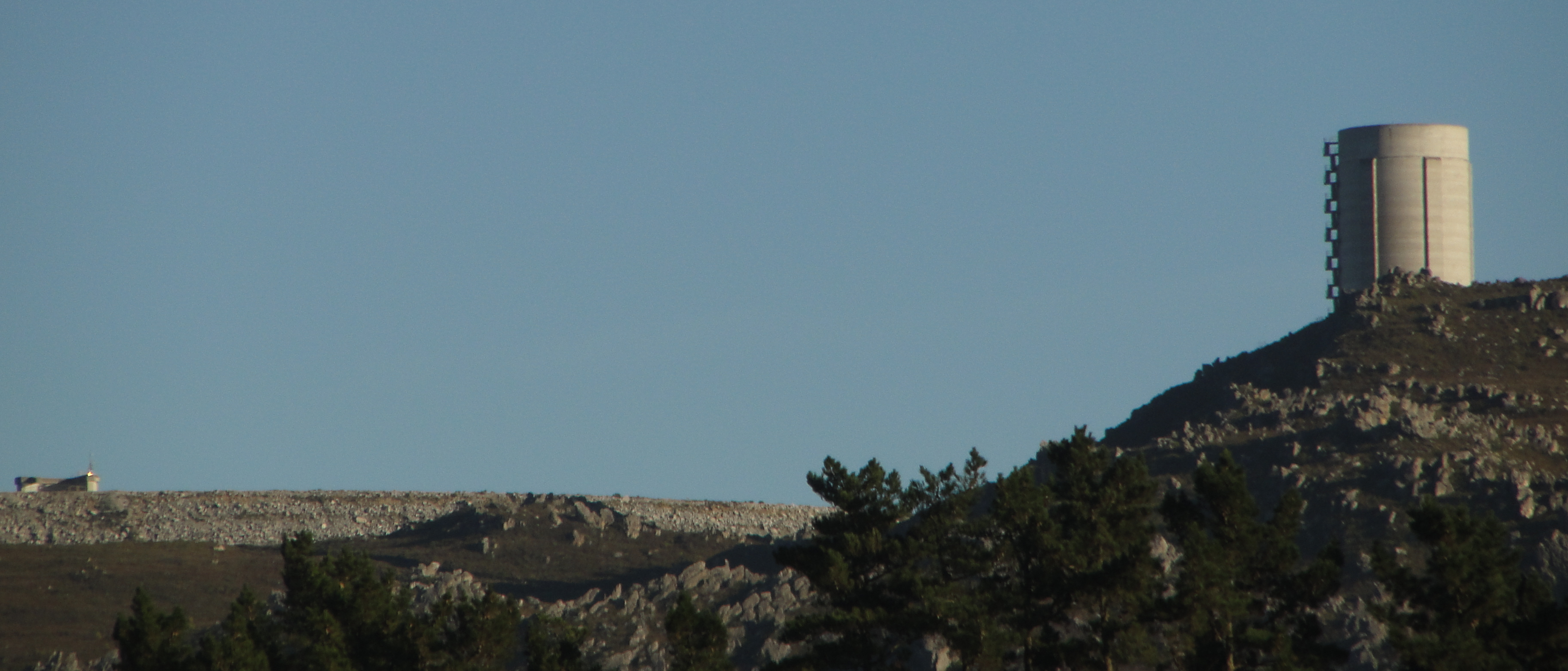
- Dam and tower of the Palmiet Pumped Storage Scheme seen from the Palmiet River

- Location within South Africa
- Location: Western Cape
- Coordinates: 34.19782°S 18.97407°E
- Status: Operational
- Opening date: 1988; 38 years ago
- Operator: Eskom

Upper reservoir
- Creates: Rockview Dam
- Total capacity: 3 100 000 m^{3}

Lower reservoir
- Creates: Kogelberg Dam

Power Station
- Installed capacity: 400 MW

The Palmiet Pumped Storage Scheme consists of two 200 megawatts (270,000 hp) turbine units located 2 kilometres (1.2 mi) upstream of the Kogelberg Dam on the Palmiet River near Cape Town, South Africa. The pumped-storage hydroelectricity plant is capable of responding to a surge in peak power demand in minutes. At night, excess power on the grid generated by conventional coal and nuclear plants is used to pump water to the upper Rockview Dam overlooking Gordon's Bay.

It is regarded as a forerunner in environmental engineering. The whole Palmiet site is a conservation area and in December 1998 the area was declared a Biosphere Reserve by UNESCO - the first in South Africa.

== See also ==
- Eskom
- List of hydropower stations in Africa
