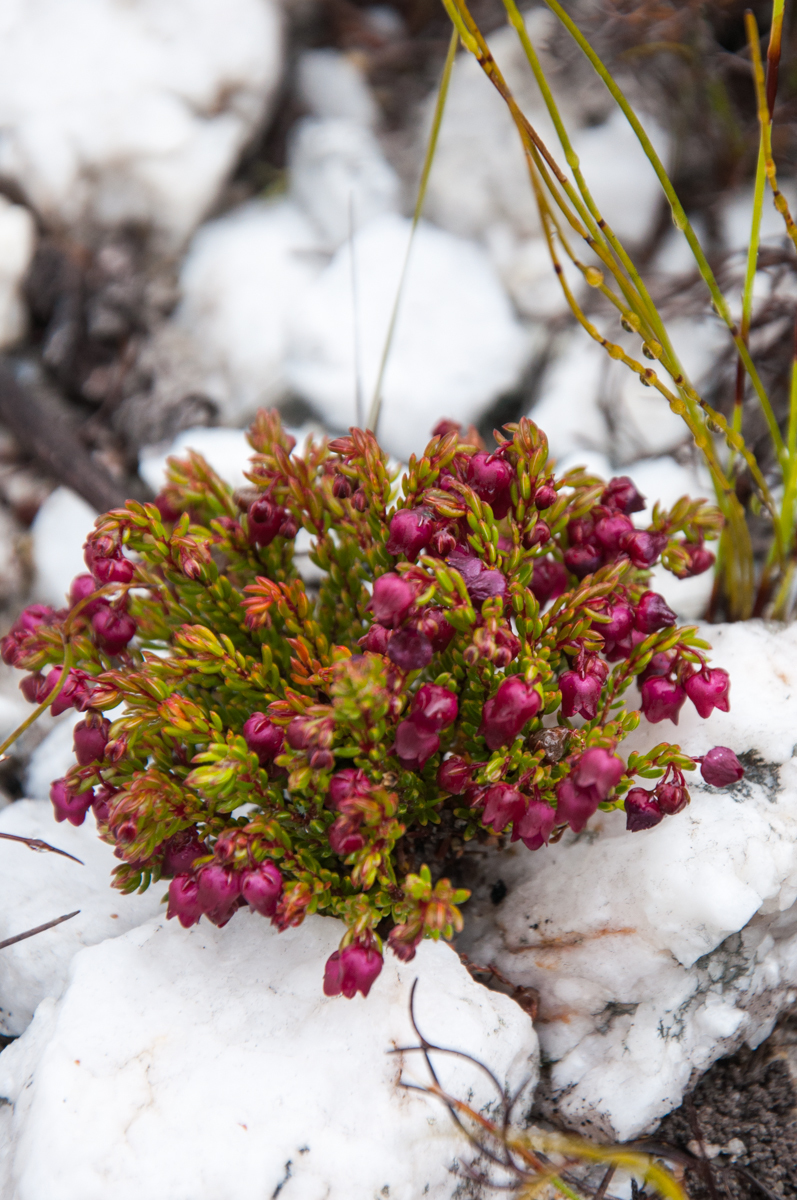

Scientific classification
- Kingdom: Plantae
- Clade: Tracheophytes
- Clade: Angiosperms
- Clade: Eudicots
- Clade: Asterids
- Order: Ericales
- Family: Ericaceae
- Genus: Erica
- Species: E. cabernetea

Binomial name
- Erica cabernetea E.G.H. Oliv.

= Erica cabernetea =

Species of flowering plant

Erica cabernetea is a plant species endemic to a small region in the Western Cape Province of South Africa.

Erica cabernetea is a small, highly branched shrub up to 15 centimetres (6 inches) tall. Leaves are up to 4 millimetres (1/8 in) long, crescent-shaped in cross section. Flowers are borne in small racemes at the tips of each of the branches. Flowers are rounded, deep red, about 4 mm across. Fruit is a dry, egg-shaped capsule about 3 mm long.

The specific epithet "cabernetea" refers to Cabernet Sauvignon, a red wine with approximately the same color as the flowers of E. cabernetea.

It is known only from the Elgin Basin in the Caledon District, Arieskraal, slopes above the Klein Palmiet River at an elevation of approximately 250 metres (820 feet), about 60 kilometres (37 miles) southeast of Cape Town. This site lies within the Kogelberg Nature Reserve.
