= Erica filiformis =

Scientific classification
- Kingdom: Plantae
- Clade: Tracheophytes
- Clade: Angiosperms
- Clade: Eudicots
- Clade: Asterids
- Order: Ericales
- Family: Ericaceae
- Genus: Erica
- Species: E. filiformis

Binomial name
- Erica filiformis Salisb.

Synonyms
- Ectasis filiformls (Salisb.) G.Don; Ericoides filiforme (Salisb.) Kuntze

Species of flowering plant

Erica filiformis is a plant that belongs to the genus Erica and forms part of the fynbos. The species is endemic to the Western Cape where it occurs from Paarl to Elgin. The plant has an area of occurrence of 1,463 km² and its habitat is threatened by invasive plants and the high frequency of fires.

The species has three varieties:

- Erica filiformis var. filiformis
- Erica filiformis var. longibracteata Bolus
- Erica filiformis var. maritima Bolus
