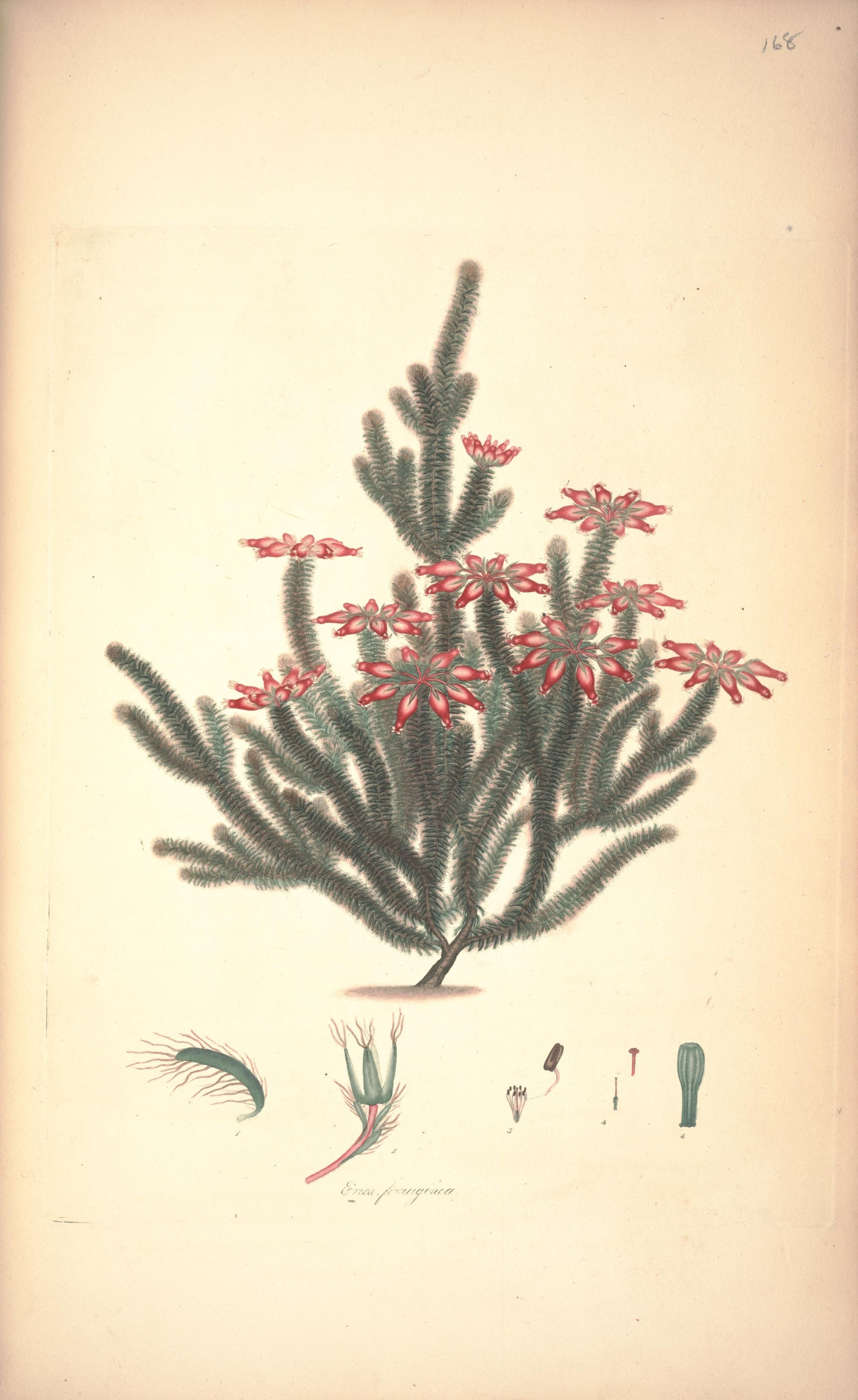

Scientific classification
- Kingdom: Plantae
- Clade: Tracheophytes
- Clade: Angiosperms
- Clade: Eudicots
- Clade: Asterids
- Order: Ericales
- Family: Ericaceae
- Genus: Erica
- Species: E. squarrosa

Binomial name
- Erica squarrosa Salisb.

Synonyms
- Callista ferruginea G.Don; Erica ferruginea Andrews; Euryloma squarrosa G.Don

= Erica squarrosa =

Species of flowering plant

Erica squarrosa is a plant belonging to the genus Erica and is part of the fynbos. The species is endemic to the Western Cape and occurs in the Hottentots Holland Mountains and Groenlandberg. There are four subpopulations, all of which are threatened by the invasive plant, the pine tree.
