= Oude Molen Distillery =

Oude Molen Distillery is situated in the Elgin Valley near the town of Grabouw in the Western Cape province of South Africa. The area is part of the Elgin Wine of Origin district and is home to several celebrated wine estates.

== History ==
=== René Santhagens ===
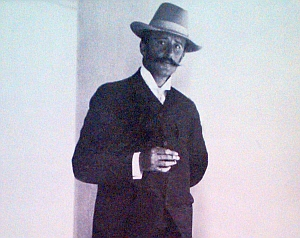
Founder René Santhagens.

The distillery was established by Reinier (René) van Eibergen Santhagens, born in Meester Cornelis, Batavia in 1864 and died in 1937 in Stellenbosch. He was an adventurer, explorer, cavalry officer and chemical engineer.

René became passionate about wine and brandy after a stay in France on the estate of the Marquis Jules Auguste de Pellerin de Latouche in Cognac. It was here that he fell in love with the Marquis' daughter, Jeanne de Pellerin de Latouche (1879-1961), whom he married in 1898 in Cape Town.

In 1897, he answered an advertisement for a distiller in the South African Republic (later the Transvaal Province). Alois Hugo Nellmapius had obtained a concession from President Paul Kruger to erect a distillery near Pretoria. To ensure high-quality standards, the distillery had advertised the position to cognac makers. Thus it was that Santhagens arrived on the goldfields of the Witwatersrand, with his own curvaceous alembic copper pot stills in tow. The distillery was a success, but production was halted during the South African war and was abandoned thereafter.

In 1903 René moved to the Cape and shortly afterward Jeanne, arrived with her father, the Marquis. By this time he had convinced most of the wine farmers of the area that his distillation methods were superior. In 1909, Santhagens purchased a farm called Oude Molen in Stellenbosch, in the shadow of the Papegaaiberg mountain. In time, Santhagens revamped the simple, single-storey tin-roofed house into a double-storey mansion with a thatched roof and gable. The fashionable couple became prominent figures in Stellenbosch and Cape society.

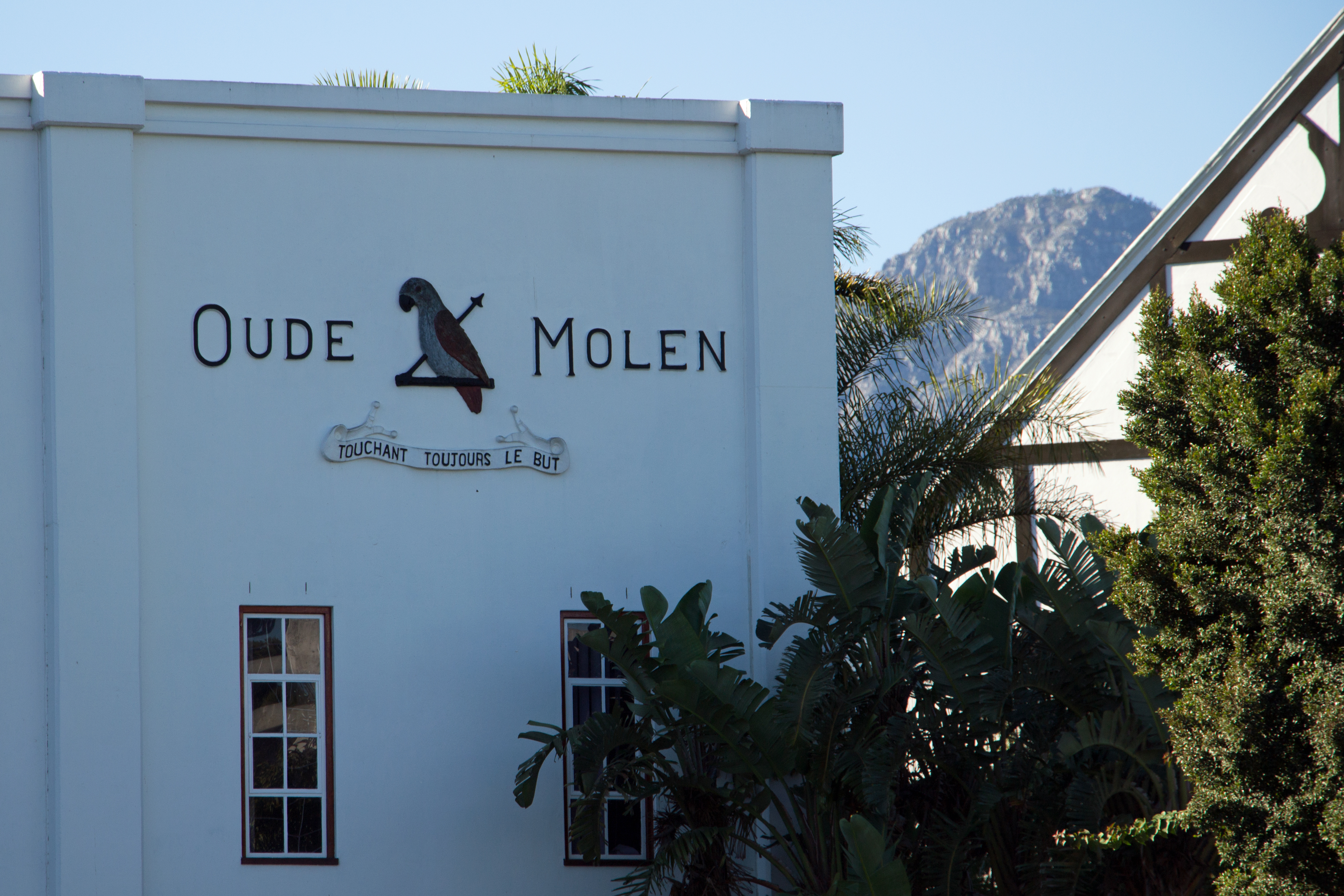
The original Stellenbosch distillery.

=== Oude Molen ===
At Oude Molen, Santhagens started production of his brandies in 1910 and became the first distiller in South Africa to use the cognac-method exclusively. His commitment to quality is perhaps best illustrated by the fact that his bedroom was directly linked with the distillery via a specially-constructed catwalk.

The "Santy's" brand soon became the benchmark of quality.

His French motto read Touchant Toujours le But ("Always hitting the mark") and his emblem was a shield depicting a parrot pierced by an arrow. Both the emblem and the motto still grace the original manor house in Stellenbosch and also the Oude Molen Distillery in Elgin.

The arrow-pierced parrot is a nod to archery competitions held in Stellenbosch, which featured painted wooden parrots as targets. These competitions took place at the foot of the Papegaaiberg ("Parrot Mountain") not far from the Santhagens homestead.

=== Legacy ===
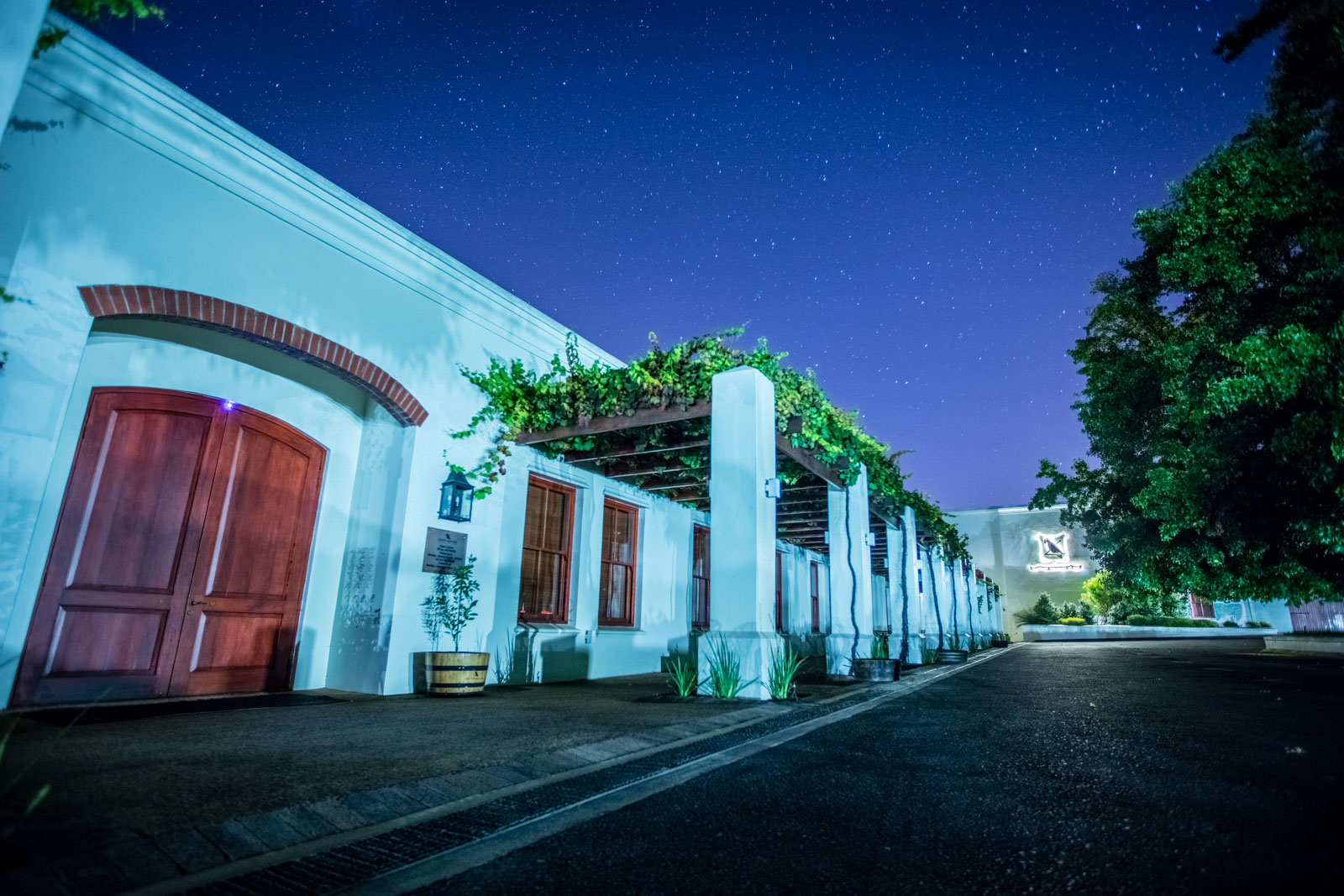
The current distillery in Grabouw.

His commitment to the cognac method of distillation and maturation gained him a national reputation for superior brandy. Santhagens was instrumental in framing the legislation that became the Wine and Spirits Act of 1924, which promulgated strict criteria for brandy distillation. When the Act came into effect, Sanghagens was the only person who had a supply of brandy that met all of its criteria.

Santhagens died in 1937, but his legacy of remains firmly established in the South African brandy industry, which is subject to some of the most stringent production legislation in the world.

=== A New Chapter ===
In 2003, Oude Molen relocated to its present site in the Elgin Valley, where legendary distiller Dave Acker had established a distillery a number of years before. The distillery was extensively renovated and modernized to become the new home of Oude Molen Cape Brandy.

== The Distillery ==
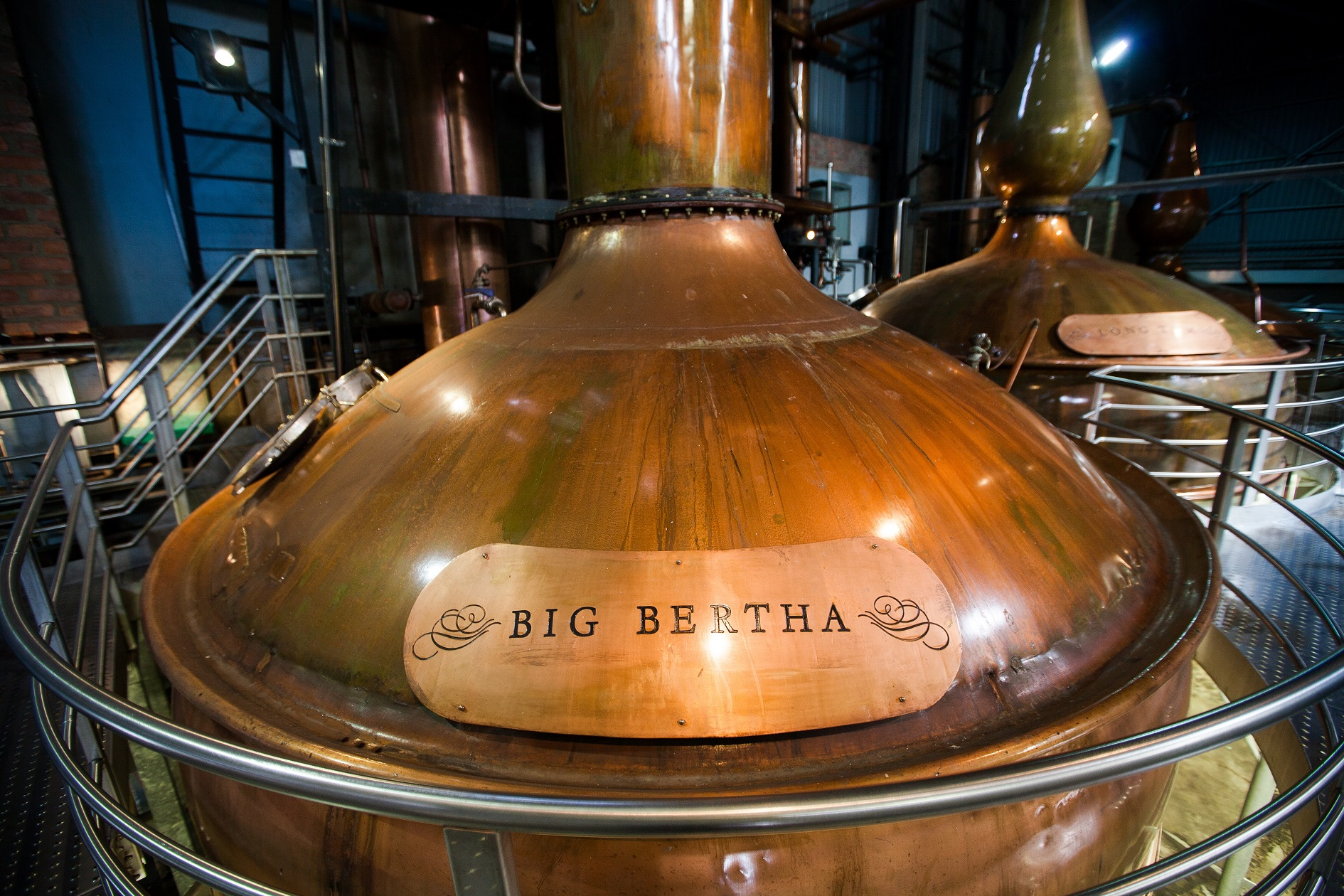
Big Bertha - the largest of Oude Molen's pot stills.

The distillery is located on a 12.6-hectare (31-acre) property, which includes a dam fed by spring water directly from the Nuweberg Mountains. Chenin blanc and colombard vineyards are planted behind the facility, on the bank of the Swannie River.

The building retains historical elements despite being part of a modern complex, with some of the roofs of the maturation cellars still supported by the original gum poles that were put in place when the first buildings were erected on the site in 1942.

Oude Molen houses the three biggest pot stills in South Africa - Big Bertha, Long Tom and Long Cecil. Made entirely of copper, the stills are more than a century old and are renowned for the freshness and purity of the spirit they yield.

Several cavernous maturation chambers contain thousands of barrels of maturing spirit. The high humidity in the Elgin Valley makes it particularly suitable for this purpose, as the amount of alcohol lost to evaporation is limited.

== Products ==
The distillery produces the acclaimed Oude Molen Cape Brandy range and is a founding member of the Cape Brandy Distillers Guild. The Cape Brandy descriptor is increasingly being used by South African distillers as an indicator of quality and provenance.

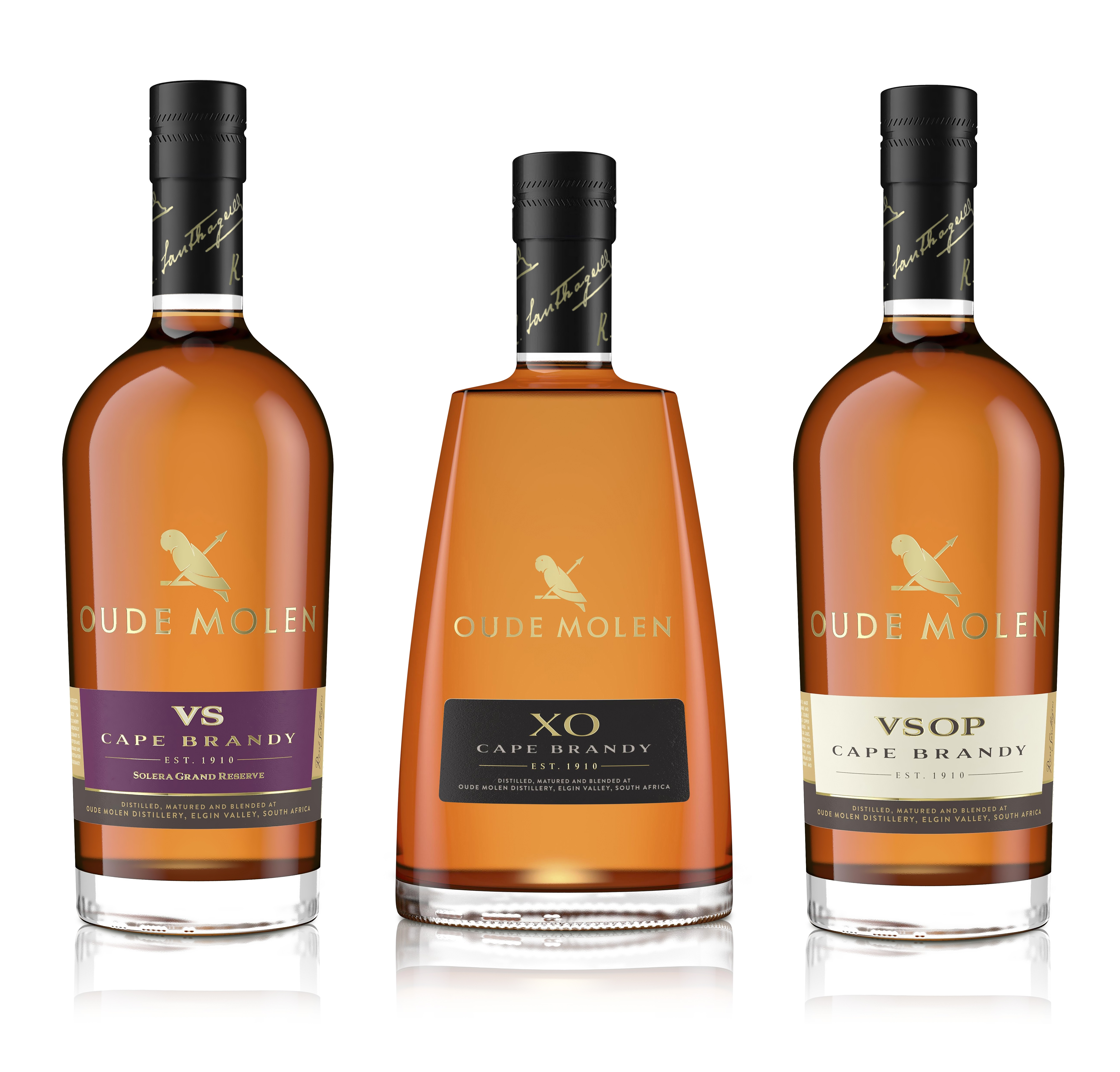
The Oude Molen Cape Brandy range.
