= Rockview Dam =

- Location within Western Cape Location within South Africa
- Official name: Rockview Dam
- Country: South Africa
- Location: Grabouw, Western Cape
- Coordinates: 34°11′16.5″S 18°57′09.5″E
- Purpose: Pumping storage
- Opening date: 1986; 40 years ago
- Owner: Department of Water Affairs

Dam and spillways
- Type of dam: Earth fill dam
- Impounds: Palmiet River
- Height: 48 metres (157 ft)
- Length: 1,300 metres (4,300 ft)

Reservoir
- Creates: Rockview Dam Reservoir
- Total capacity: 16,400,000 cubic metres (580,000,000 cu ft)
- Catchment area: 1.5 km^{2}
- Surface area: 73 hectares (180 acres)

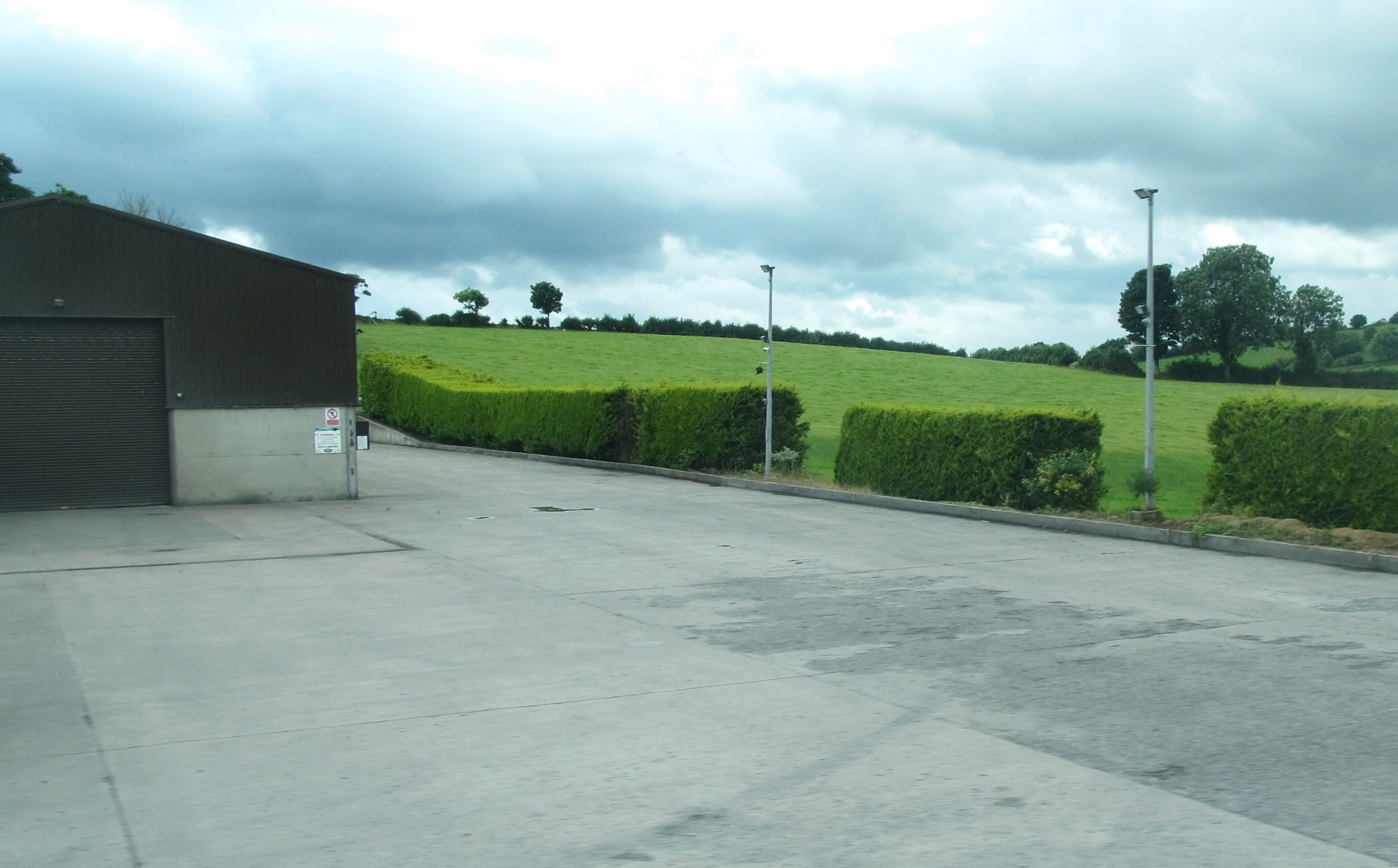

Rockview Dam is a zoned earth-fill/rock-fill type dam located on the Palmiet River near Grabouw, Western Cape, South Africa. It was established in 1986 and serves mainly for pumping purposes (storage). The hazard potential of the dam has been ranked high (3).

== See also ==
- List of reservoirs and dams in South Africa
- List of rivers of South Africa
