= Kogelberg Dam =

- Interactive map of Kogelberg Dam
- Official name: Kogelberg Dam
- Location: South Africa
- Coordinates: 34°12′7″S 18°58′1″E
- Opening date: 1986
- Operators: Department of Water Affairs and Forestry

Dam and spillways
- Type of dam: gravity & arch
- Impounds: Palmiet River
- Height: 52 m
- Length: 850 m

Reservoir
- Creates: Kogelberg Dam Reservoir
- Total capacity: 19 300 000 m³
- Catchment area: 179 km^{2}
- Surface area: 155 ha

Kogelberg Dam is a combined gravity & arch type dam located on the Palmiet River, near Grabouw, Western Cape, South Africa. It was established in 1986 and its primary purpose is to serve for irrigation and industrial use. The hazard potential of the dam has been ranked high (3).

== See also ==
- List of reservoirs and dams in South Africa
- List of rivers of South Africa
