= Grabouw =

Town in Western Cape, South Africa

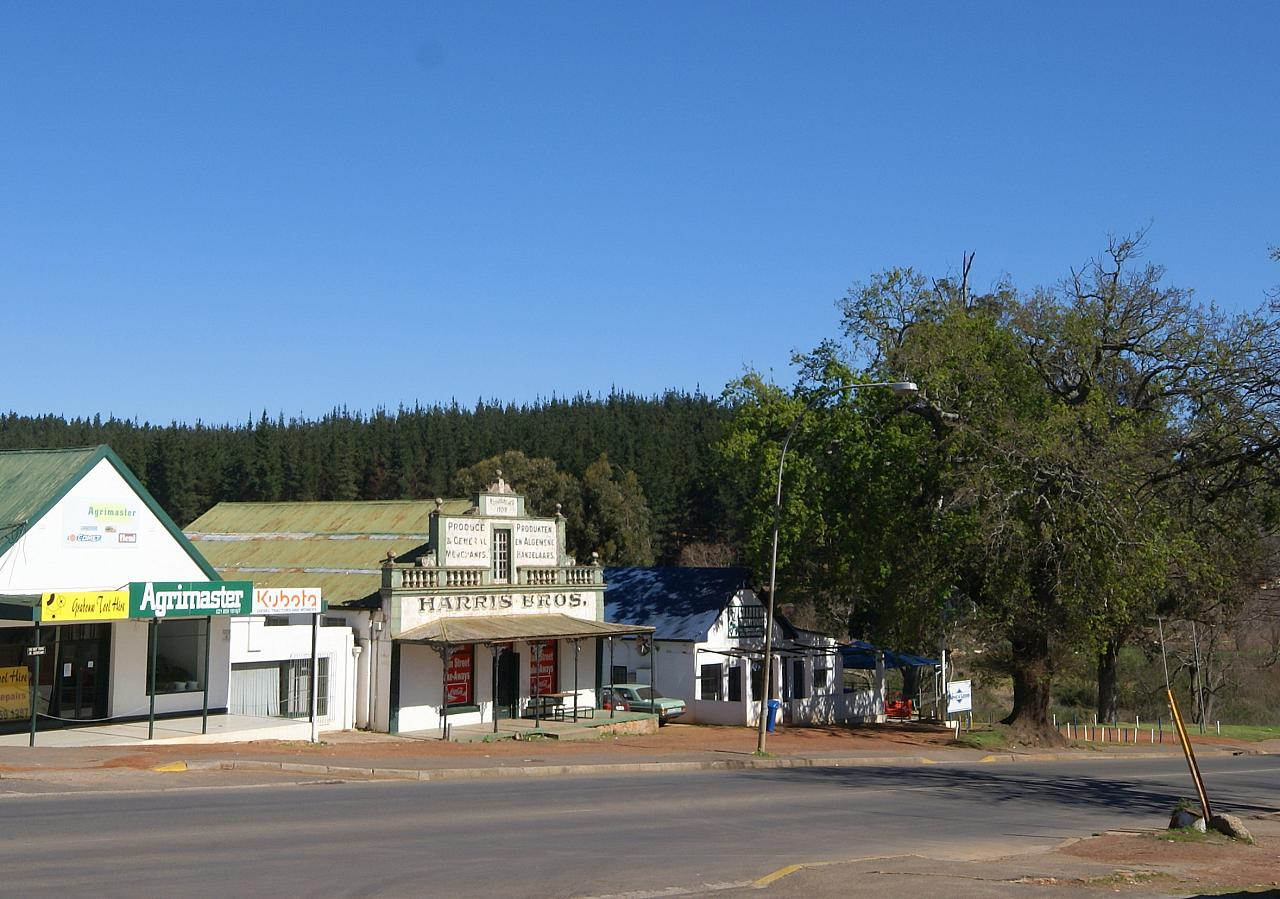
- Old buildings on the outskirts of Grabouw

- Location within Western Cape Location within South Africa
- Coordinates: 34°09′S 19°01′E
- Country: South Africa
- Province: Western Cape
- District: Overberg
- Municipality: Theewaterskloof

Area
  - Total: 6.65 km^{2} (2.57 sq mi)

Population (2019)
  - Total: 44 593
  - Density: 6.6/km^{2} (17/sq mi)

Racial makeup (2011)
  - Black African: 38.5%
  - Coloured: 55.8%
  - Indian/Asian: 0.2%
  - White: 4.6%
  - Other: 0.9%

First languages (2011)
  - Afrikaans: 61.8%
  - Xhosa: 28.5%
  - Sotho: 5.0%
  - English: 2.5%
  - Other: 2.2%
- Time zone: UTC+2 (SAST)
- Postal code (street): 7160
- PO box: 7160
- Area code: 021

Grabouw (/xrʌˈboʊ/ khrub-OH, Afrikaans: [χraˈbœu]) is a town located in the Western Cape province of South Africa. Grabouw is located some 65 km south-east of Cape Town, over Sir Lowry's Pass from Somerset West, along the N2 highway. The town is the commercial centre for the vast Elgin Valley, the largest single export fruit-producing area in Southern Africa, which extends between the Hottentots-Holland, Kogelberg, Groenland, and Houwhoek Mountains. The town's population has grown rapidly, with 44,593 people in 2019 from 21,593 as listed by the 2001 census.

== History ==
=== Pre-colonial history ===
The original inhabitants of the area were the Khoikhoi pastoralists and the San hunter gatherers. The indigenous people of the region, the Chainouqua Khoi, inhabited a large area on both sides of the Hottentots Holland Mountains. They traded with early European settlers, but were later dispossessed from their lands by the Dutch colonists, who began to move into the area in the late 1600s and took the Chainouqua land for farming. Fortunately, the Khoikhoi names for some of the region's specific land-forms are recorded, and include Houtema, which is thought to have been the name for the Palmiet River, and Gantouw which was the name for Sir Lowry's Pass.

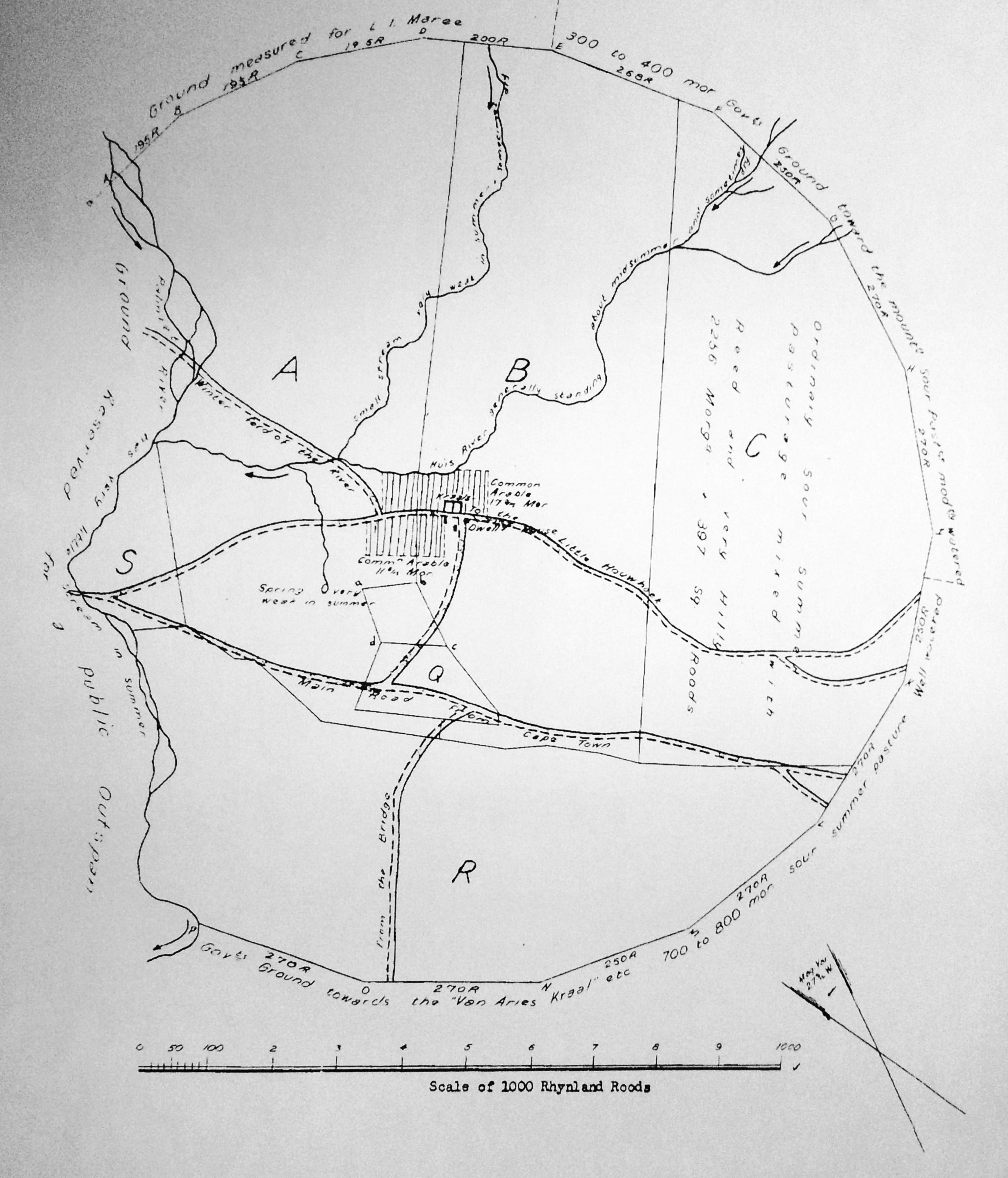
Early historical map of the Grabouw area.

=== Early colonial era ===
The original Chairouqua name for the region where Grabouw is located is unfortunately not known. However a wide range of different names sprung up in colonial times. The town's location was first a stopping point for wagons on the route eastwards from Cape Town, along the route which the N2 highway now follows. The area was known at the time as "Koffiekraal". Another colonial name for the area was "Groenland" ("Greenland" in Dutch) - a name given by early European settlers to various parts of the region, but which now applies only to the mountainous area to the north. The town itself was created on the farm "Grietjiesgat", bought in 1856 by Wilhelm Langschmidt, a painter from Cape Town, who started the community around his wife's little trading store. Langschmidt named the village after the German town Grabow where he was born. It was initially spelt as "Grabau".

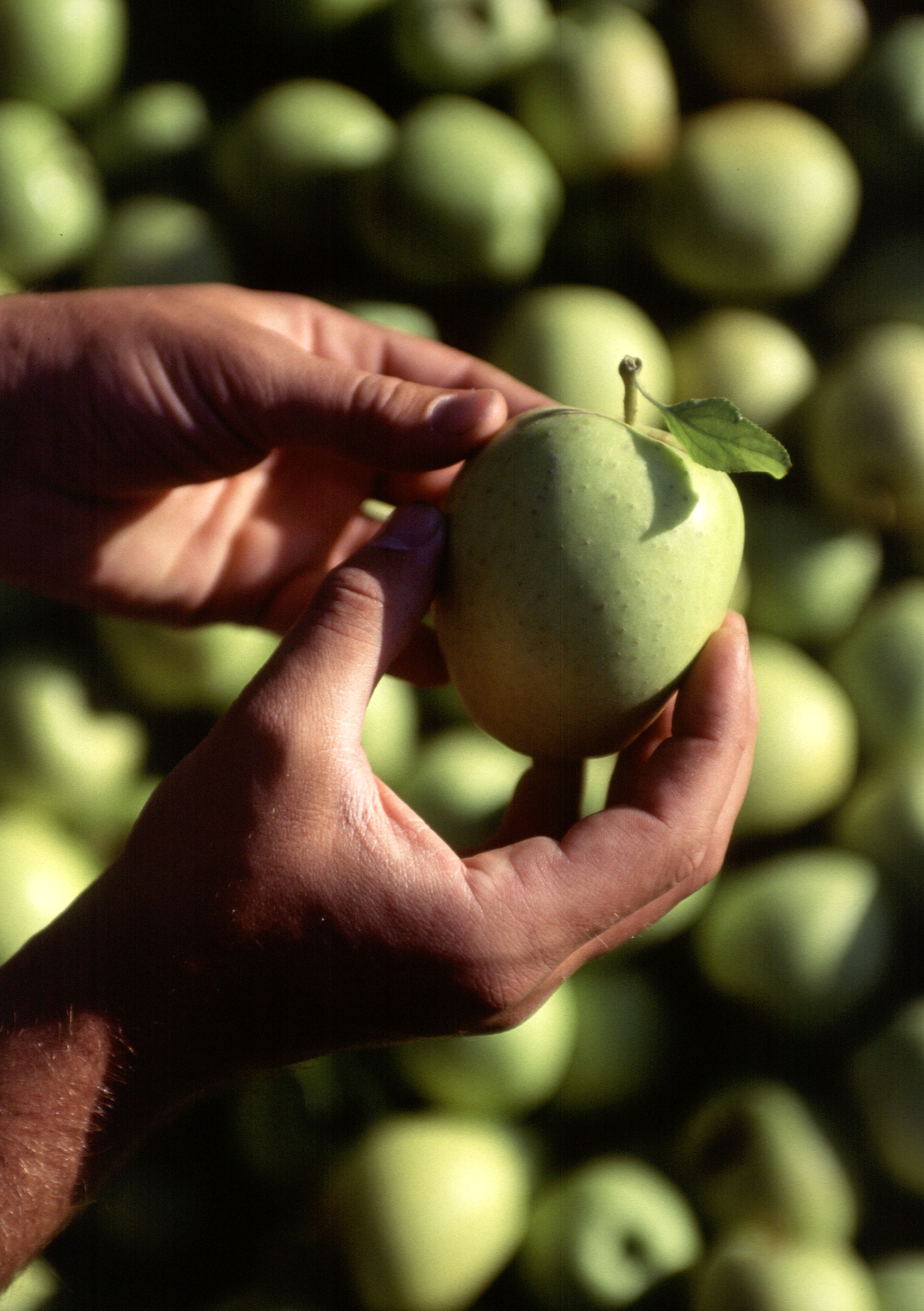
The town's economic activity has historically been centred on deciduous fruit farming. Now increasingly, the wine and tourism industry is growing.

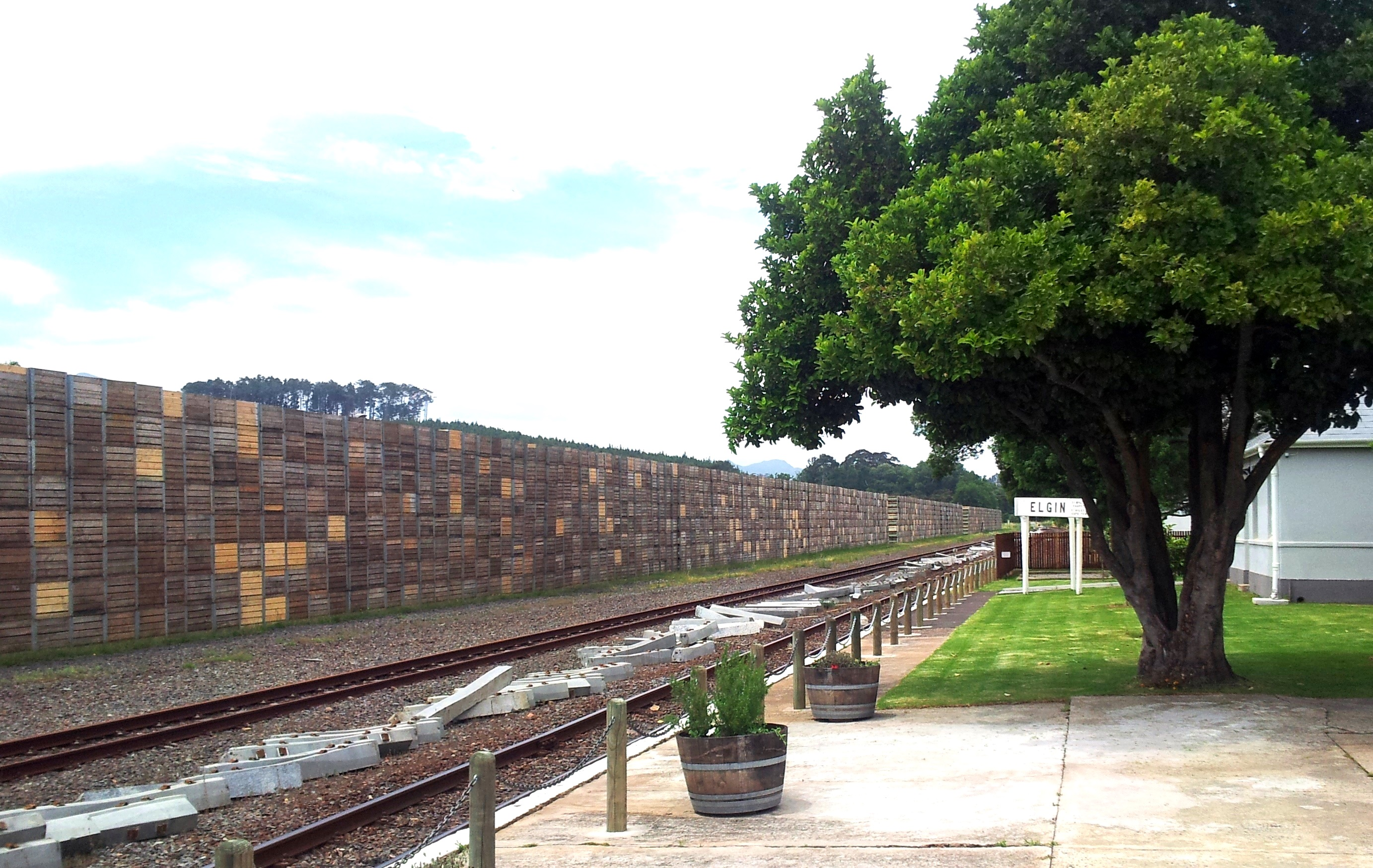
The original train station of Grabouw.

=== Agricultural revolution ===
In the early 1900s, the village and surrounding area underwent an agricultural revolution, that had a profound effect on the Grabouw's development. This was the beginning of deciduous fruit farming, which became the town's main economic activity and correlated with a large growth in the town's population.

The local suffragist farmer Antonie Viljoen is recorded as the first purchaser of apple trees in the area. However it was in fact his farm workers who first successfully farmed them, on their own plots, and through their own private initiative. In 1903 the Italian South African Molteno family also began to farm in the area - including two brothers who - together with Viljoen's "Oak Valley" farms - helped to build the town's deciduous fruit industry. Another influential pioneer for this period in Grabouw's history was a local woman farmer - Kathleen Murray. She was extremely active also in Grabouw community development (and later became an enthusiastic member of the Black Sash movement). These enterprises turned Grabouw into the hub of Southern Africa's largest single export fruit-producing area. Other influential pioneers were the Beukes family and the Franco-Italian immigrant Edmond Lombardi, who created an apple-juice drink he called "Appletiser", on his nearby farm Applethwaite, and introduced it to the market in 1966.

Fueled by the agricultural development of the surrounding region, the town became an economic hub, and gained its first local council in 1923. Full municipal status was granted in 1956.

=== Modern developments ===
By the end of the 20th century, a significant shift began in Grabouw's economic focus, with a move towards viticulture and tourism. A large and thriving wine industry has developed across the valley, and wines from the region have won several international awards.

The Elgin valley is South Africa's coolest climate wine-growing region and a range of other geographic factors (for example, its proximity to the Atlantic Ocean, cool temperatures, plentiful winter rainfall, prevailing wind directions, and altitude) have created a set of conditions for wine growing which are markedly different to those in surrounding areas. Of the many varietals grown in the region, special attention has been paid to Sauvignon Blanc and Pinot Noir.

Grabouw and its surrounding valley is historically significant for South Africa's wine history also because, of all the country's regions, it had one of the earliest movements towards Black ownership of vineyards and wineries. The Elgin winery Thandi was in fact the country's second post-Apartheid winery with significant black involvement (after New Beginnings in Paarl).

== Economy ==
The town's economy is based on servicing the surrounding agricultural industry, with the Elgin Valley being intensively used for viticulture and the cultivation of apples, pears, plums and other deciduous fruit.

This agricultural region produces 65% of South Africa's apple exports. One of the biggest factories in Grabouw is Appletiser which provides the popular Appletiser soft drinks. Altogether, this has earned it the reputation worldwide as the "valley of apples".

The wine industry is an increasingly important component of the town's economy. The surrounding agricultural region has undergone a move from deciduous fruit farming to viticulture, and this has had an effect on Grabouw, as the region's population hub.

Tourism is also of importance to the economy. The N2 highway through the valley is extremely busy during the holiday season.

== Education ==
The town has a number of schools:

- Grabouw High
- Groenberg Secondary
- Umyezo High
- DE Rust Future Academy
- Kingsway Christian Private
- Pineview Primary
- Kathleen Murray Primary
- Umyezo Primary
- St. Michael Primary
- Glen Elgin Primary
- Maxonia Primary
- Arrieskraal Primary
- Dennegeur Primary
- Agape Special Needs School
- Applewood Preparatory School

== Attractions ==
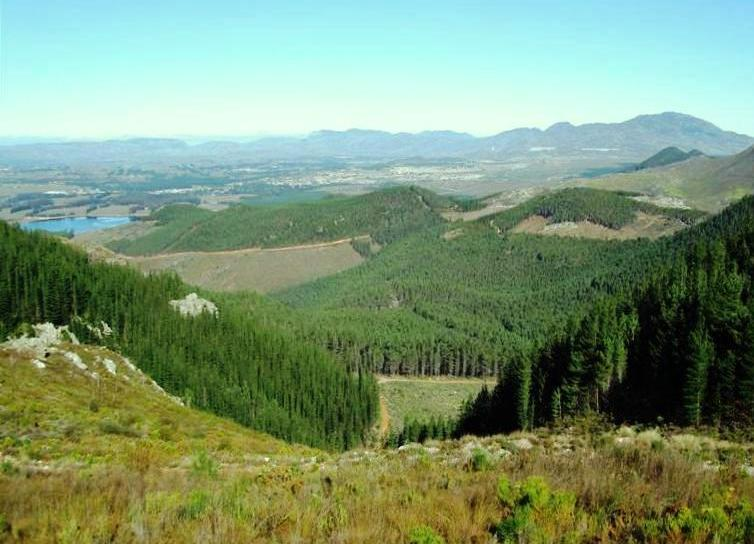
View over the Elgin valley, towards Grabouw

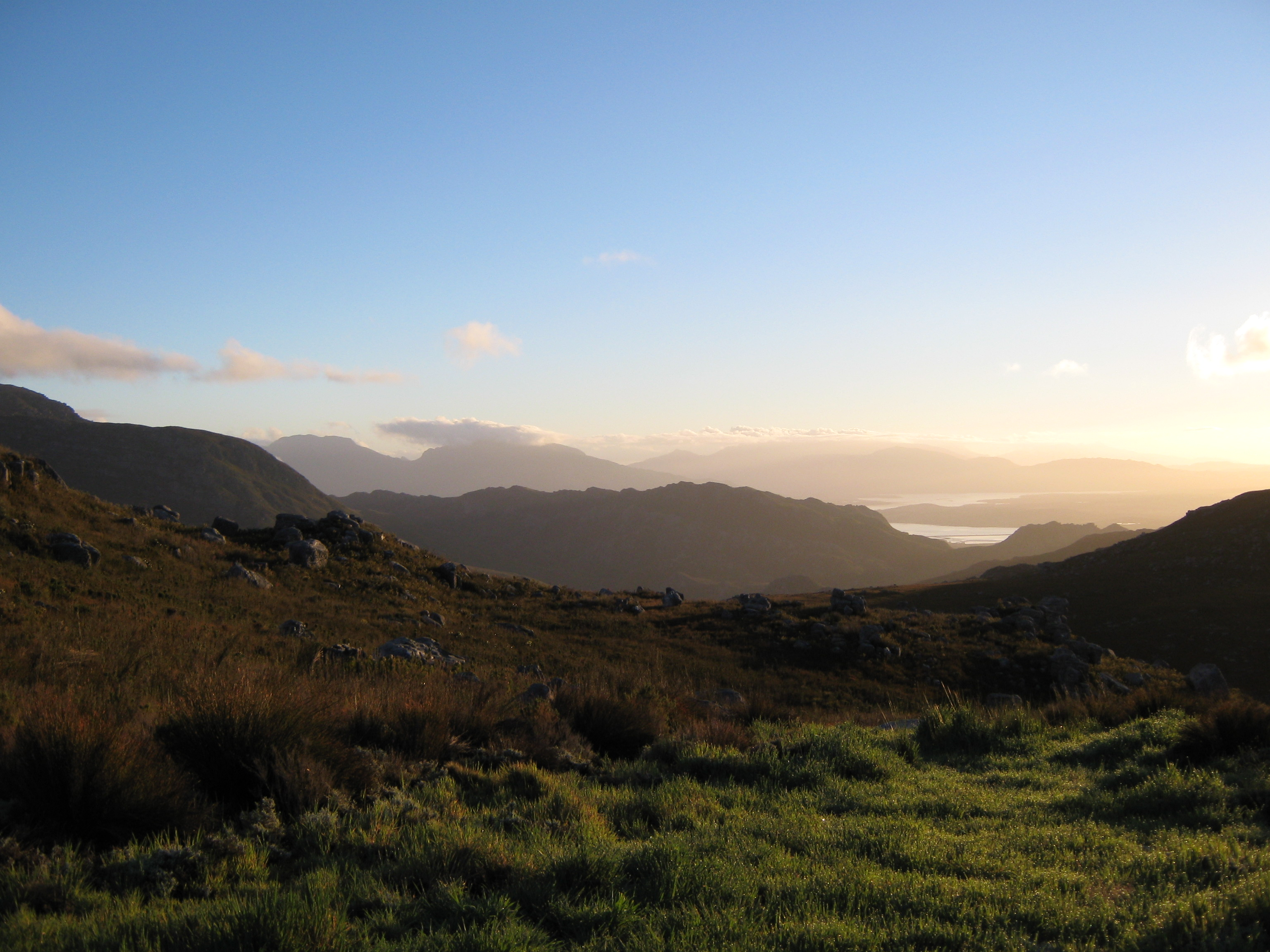
The Hottentots Holland Mountains, one of several surrounding mountain ranges.

Situated by the Palmiet river in the fertile Elgin valley, Grabouw is surrounded by the Hottentots Holland and Groenland mountains to the north, and the Kogelberg Biosphere Reserve to the south. Several routes for exploring the surrounding mountains begin from the town.

There is wine and cider tasting on the surrounding farms. A brandy tasting and cellar tour is also available from Oude Molen Distillery which is just outside the town. There is also the annual Elgin Festival, which takes place on the last week-end in October and boasts a wide range of flower displays, fruit, wines and a great variety of local products.

Within the town, the Elgin Apple Museum is one of the oldest remaining buildings in Grabouw. It is situated on the banks of the Palmiet River. The Museum depicts the history of the fruit industry in the region. The nearby Grabouw Country Club has scenic views overlooking the Eikenhof dam and pine-covered mountains. Applethwaite Farm and Church, was built in the early 1960s by Edmond Lombardi, the founder of Appletiser.

The church was built for the use of the farming community and is interesting because of the Italian marbles and wood carvings of the Stations of the Cross.

== List of Suburbs ==
- Komga
- Molteno Park
- Klipkop
- Newtown
- Waterworks
- Pineview
- Pineview North
- Beverly Hills
- Lost City
- Dennekruin
- Bosbou
- Shukushukum
- Siteview
- Snake Park
- Hillside
- Xola Naledi
- Siyanyanzela
- Khutsong
- Steenbras
- Zola
- Old Rooidakke
- Rooidakke
- Timbers

== Notable people ==
- Wilhelm Langschmidt (1805-1866) - A German-born South African painter and drawing master of 59 Long Street, Cape Town.
- Antonio Viljoen (1858-1918) - An influential liberal Afrikaner politician and progressive farmer of the Cape Colony, South Africa.
- Kathleen Murray - Political activist, member of Black Sash movement.
- Louis Kreiner - former Mayor of Cape Town
- Sol Kreiner - former Mayor of Cape Town and brother of Louis.
- Edmond Lombardi - Entrepreneur who created "Appletiser" apple-juice drink.
- René Santhagens - The distillery pioneer born in Batavia in 1864.
- Edward Molteno (1877-1950) and Harry Molteno (1880-1969) - Sons of Cape Prime Minister, John Molteno. Pioneering and successful fruit exporters.
- Adrian Kuiper (1959-) - Former South African international cricketer and a farmer.
- Mzwandile Makwayiba - South African trade unionist
- Karin Kortje - Gospel, R&B and Pop singer. Third season winner of South African Idols.
- Ronelda Kamfer - Afrikaans-speaking South African poet.
- Luyanda Qolo - Former athlete that represented South Africa in 2011 IAAF World Cross Country Championships - Junior men's race in Spain.
- Mojowise - A rapper, song writer and actor, two times Media and Arts Music Awards nominee.
- Aphiwe Dyantyi - South African professional rugby union player.

== Climate ==
The town experiences a very mild Mediterranean climate, more moderate than most other Western Cape locales, with abundant rainfall, mostly in the winter months, although strong summer south-easterly winds can sometimes bring squalls. This wind is known as the "Black South-Easter" for its gusting winds and showers.
