= Groenland mountains =

Mountain range in the Western Cape, South Africa

- Location within South Africa

Highest point
- Coordinates: 34°6′40.55″S 19°6′49.18″E

Geography
- Country: South Africa
- State: Western Cape
- Region: Overberg

The Groenland (Dutch for "Greenland") is a small mountain range in the Western Cape, South Africa, and forms part of the Cape Fold Belt.

== Location and geography ==
The Groenland mountains run from east to west. They lie between the Hottentots Holland mountains to the west, and the Houwhoek mountains to the south-east. They thus form the northern boundary of the Elgin valley. They are located between the towns of Grabouw in the south-west, and Villiersdorp in the north-east. These towns are linked by the Viljoen's Pass (named after local farmer Antonie Viljoen), part of the R321 road which cuts through the Groenland mountains at the point where the Palmiet River flows. The range is primarily composed of Table Mountain Sandstone.

== History ==
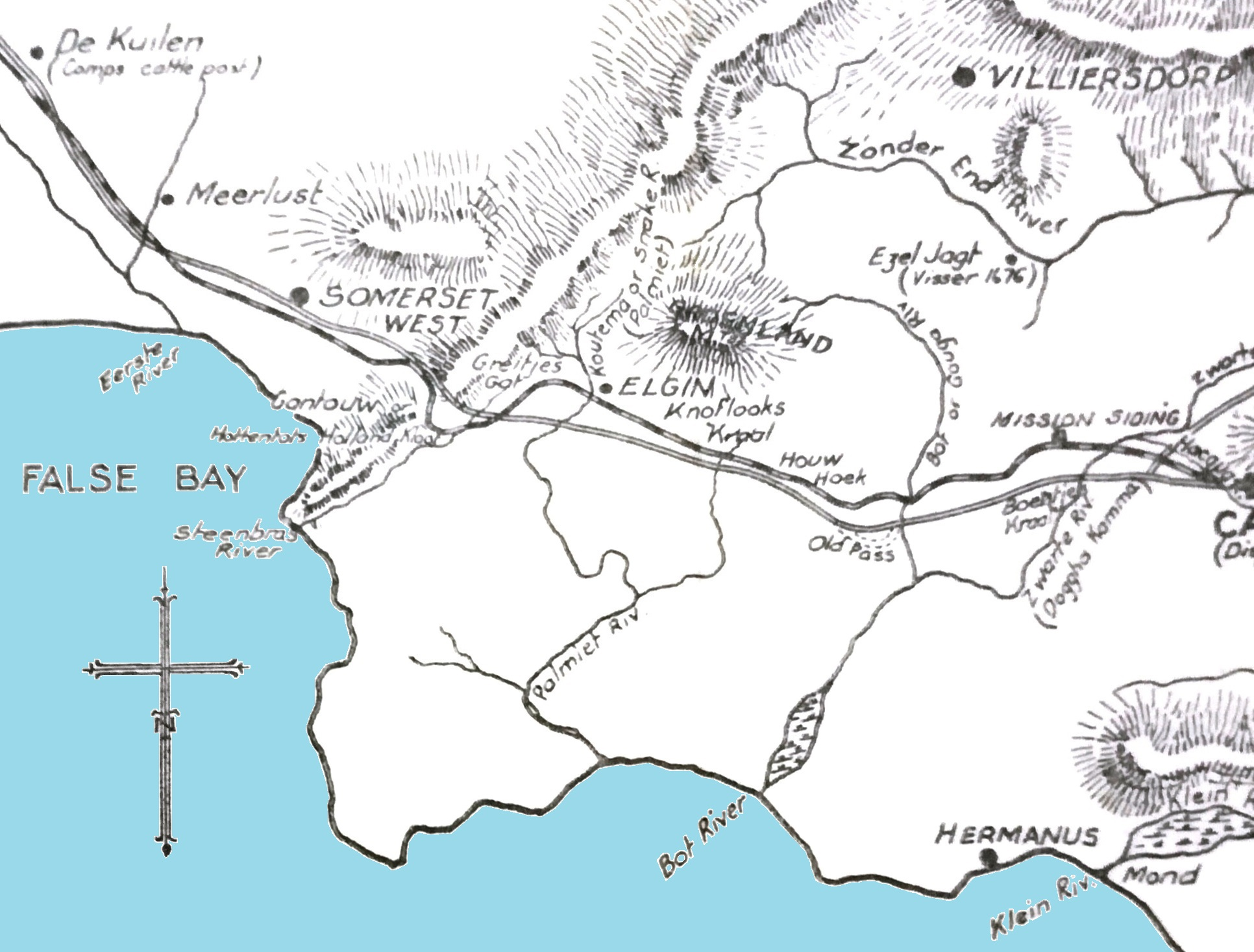
Historical map showing location of the Groenland Mountains in the south-western Cape. Cape Archives.

=== Pre-colonial history ===
The mountain and its surrounding areas were originally the homeland of the indigenous Chainouqua Khoi people (also spelled as Chainoqua), who inhabited a large area on either side of the Hottentots Holland mountains. Under the leadership of their Chiefs - such as Soeswa, and later "Klaas" Dorha - the Chainoqua attempted to resist the expansion of European colonists into Chainoqua territory. However the region ultimately fell under European control, and the Chainoqua were displaced from their land, which was divided into farms for European colonists.

=== Colonial era ===
The name "Groenland" was given by early European colonists to both the mountains, and to the surrounding area. Meaning "Greenland" in Dutch, it refers to the lush green vegetation of the mountain and its surrounds (Although the name is also the Dutch language term for the island of Greenland in the north Atlantic, the two toponyms were coined independently of each other). The original indigenous Chainoqua names for the area's landforms are unfortunately not well recorded.

The low-lying region to the south, acquired the name "Elgin", after its historic railway station. The station name in turn originally came from the name of a young locally-born girl, Elgine Herold, who was tragically killed by snake-bite in the 1800s near the spot where the current station stands. The grieving father and community named the whole area in her memory, and through a series of events, her name came to be memorialised in the name of both the station, and the whole valley. The Elgin area had formerly also held other names, such as "Koffiekraal" or sometimes as "Grietjiesgat", and was also known as "Groenland" during parts of the early Dutch and British colonial era. However these names fell out of usage.

=== Modern naming ===
By compromise, both names - Groenland and Elgin - came to be preserved. Avoiding further confusion, the term "Groenland" was kept for the high and mountainous area to the north, while the term "Elgin" remained for the low-lying valley region to the south.

The mountains are located within the modern Theewaterskloof Local Municipality, in the far west of the greater Overberg District Municipality.

The "Groenlandberg Conservancy" was established in 1994 in the Groenland mountains, and takes its name from the Afrikaans version of the mountain range's name.

Other initiatives named after these mountains include the "Green Mountain Eco Route".
