= Wilhelm Langschmidt =

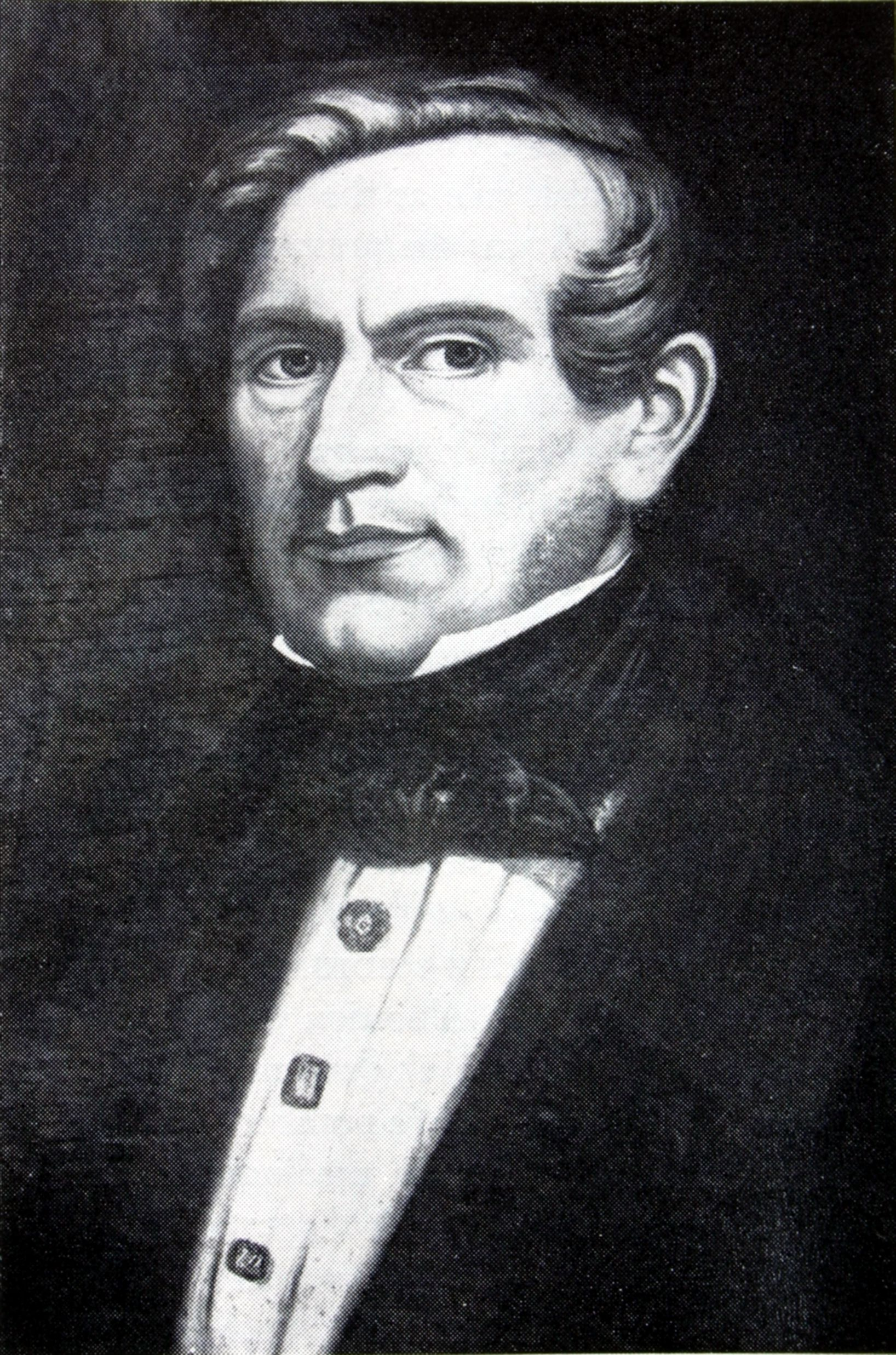
Langschmidt self-portrait

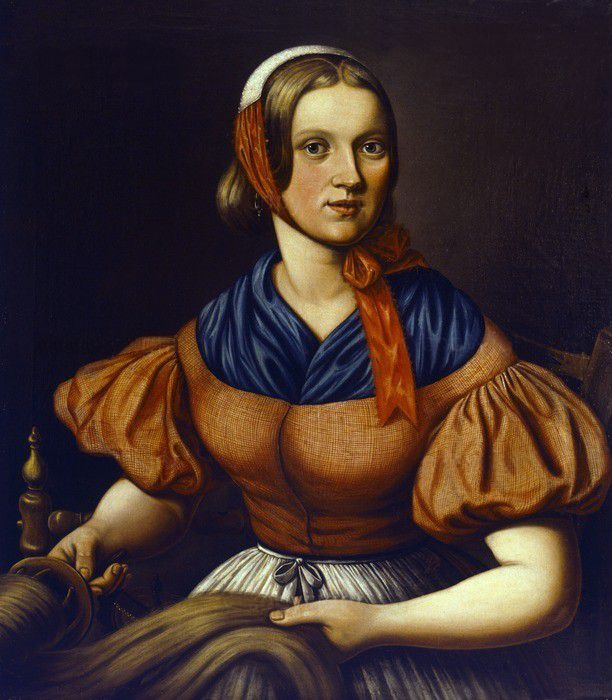
Langschmidt's portrait of his wife Dorothea Ahrens

Wilhelm Heinrich Franz Ludwig Langschmidt (10 January 1805 – 5 October 1866) was a German-born painter and drawing master who spent most of his life in the Cape Colony, living at 59 Long Street, Cape Town.

He was the seventh child in a family of 4 sons and 3 daughters raised by August Wilhelm Langschmidt (*8 June 1754), a wealthy merchant of Grabow, and his wife Dorothea Elisabeth Höpcker (*6 September 1774). Wilhelm was expected to take up the profession of merchant, but showed little interest in such a career, and instead had a great passion for painting. In 1826 he turned to the Mecklenburg Grand Duke Friedrich Franz for support, but was rejected. For a while he studied in Berlin, in the Kingdom of Prussia, under Prof. Kretsch, and decided to emigrate to Cape Colony, but not before marrying Dorothea Ahrens from Ludwigslust, 18 years his junior.

The couple landed in Cape Town on 2 March 1840, where Langschmidt lived and worked until 1851. He was active as a miniaturist, and portrait and landscape painter, working mainly in oils, pastels and chalks. He also ran drawing classes and was a competent lithographer. A supporter of the Anti-Convict movement, he destroyed a portrait he had painted of the Governor, Sir Harry Smith, at an anti-convict meeting.

Returning to his merchant roots in 1856, Langschmidt bought the farm "Grietjiesgat" and started a trading store, around which in due course the town of Grabouw grew, named for his German hometown. Langschmidt is assumed to have eventually retired to his farm "Gustrow", also near Elgin in the Cape Colony. He had at least 18 children, some sources citing 23, including 3 sets of twins. Langschmidt's great, great grandson is the Cape Town artist and whale conservationist, Noel Ashton.

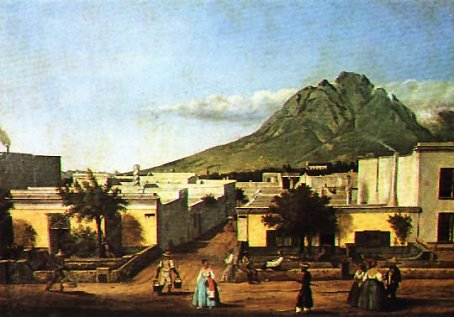
Long Street (1850), The William Fehr Collection
