= Kathleen Murray =

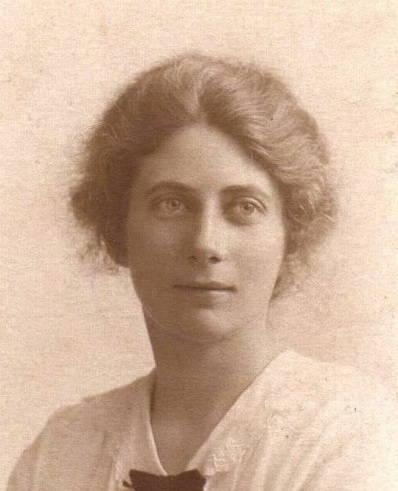
- Kathleen Murray. Cape farmer and activist.
- Born: 9 August 1892; Kenilworth, Cape Town, Cape Colony
- Died: 9 February 1984 (aged 92)
- Education: Bedales School
- Occupations: Export farmer, philanthropist and Black Sash activist

Caroline Kathleen Murray (9 August 1892 – 9 February 1984) was an export farmer, philanthropist and Black Sash activist of Elgin, South Africa.

== Background ==
Kathleen Murray was born in Kenilworth, Cape Town. She was the youngest daughter of Dr Charles Murray, an Irish naval Doctor, and Caroline Molteno, an early suffragette of the Cape Colony. She attended Bedales School. As a girl she decided to go into farming rather than to marry. She was one of the first single woman farmers in the region. She began with beekeeping and small patches of vegetables. By the end of her life she ran a large commercial deciduous farming enterprise and the produce of her farms won prizes around the world. In Elgin she chaired the farming co-operative and was responsible for schools for the underprivileged as well as other local projects. She was an active figure in the non-violent women's resistance group Black Sash from the 1950s onwards.
