= Antonie Viljoen =

Afrikaner politician and farmer

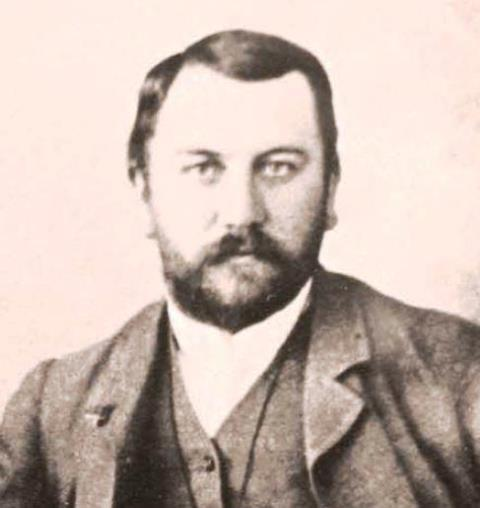
Dr Anthonie Gysbert Viljoen of Elgin

Sir Antonie Gysbert Viljoen (21 August 1858 – 26 October 1918) was an influential liberal Afrikaner politician and progressive farmer of the Cape Colony, South Africa.

== Early life and career ==
Born on 21 August 1858, Viljoen was raised at Middelplaas, Caledon, and was the only one of his 10 siblings to be properly educated, matriculating at the South African College school in Cape Town. He studied medicine eventually at the University of Edinburgh, graduating with Sir Arthur Conan-Doyle. He travelled in Europe and studied a range of agricultural practices too. On returning to South Africa, he served as District Surgeon in Caledon, where he met and married his wife Margaretha Johanna Jacoba (Maggie) Beyers. The couple had three daughters, Maria Elizabeth Anna (who died at age 8 years), Johanna Jakobmina Kurgerina (Hannah) (married to Rawbone), and Oaklene Savoye Marguerite (married to Hewat).

== Elgin farming (1898–1918) ==
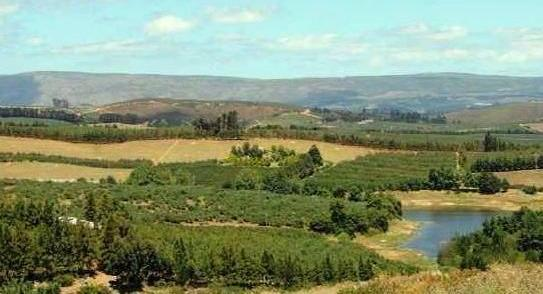
The undulating hills of the vast Elgin valley - source of much of South Africa's deciduous fruit exports.

In the 1880s he lived and worked in the Transvaal Republic, and served as pres Paul Kruger's personal surgeon (one of his daughters was named "Krugerina" after Paul Kruger) and with the money he earned there, he bought farmland in the Elgin Valley in 1898, part of which was the Oak Valley farm.

He spent much of the next few years under house arrest on his farm (he had signed up as a medical officer with the Boer army, during the Anglo-Boer war, and was soon captured by the British. His internment on Oak Valley was only granted on condition that he paid for the services of two British soldiers to guard him for the duration of the war!) Antonie Viljoen was a farmer extraordinaire growing everything from grape vines to potatoes. Among his many farming achievements were the purchase of the first deciduous fruit trees in the Elgin valley after realising that the area was ideally suited for the cultivation of apples and pears. He is regarded as the pioneer to establish the apple industry of the region. These were initially grown and maintained by his farm labourers, largely as their own separate concern, however they constituted the first known deciduous orchard in the region.

== Political career ==
Viljoen was elected to the Legislative Council (Upper House) of the Cape Parliament in 1903, for the South Western Circle. For the year he was on the council, he worked primarily on healing the wounds between the English and Afrikaner ethnic groups after the Anglo-Boer War.

In 1904 he was elected to the House of Assembly (Lower House) of the Cape Parliament, for the Caledon district. In this capacity, he worked on conservation (banning the sale of certain species of wild flower, and cooperating on the founding of Kirstenbosch National Botanical Garden).

Viljoen was part of a liberal grouping in parliament, who strongly supported women's suffrage and the extension of the multi-racial Cape Qualified Franchise. His most famous contribution was in being part of the first attempt to extend the vote to women of all races, with fellow MPs JW Sauer and James Molteno on 4 July 1907. Viljoen was in fact the MP who first tabled the motion.

At the formation of the Union of South Africa, he was also elected to the Senate, where he continued his policies of pushing for a more inclusive, multi-racial, and gender-sensitive future for the country. He was knighted by the British king in 1916. The Viljoen pass between Elgin and Villiersdorp is named after him. His descendants still farm on Oak Valley, Elgin, under the surname Rawbone-Viljoen after the husband of his daughter Johannah Jakobmina Krugerina, George Crundwell Rawbone, changed the family's surname to Rawbone-Viljoen to comply with Viljoen's will and testament, viz that the farm can only be inherited by a descendant who bears the surname "Viljoen".

== Later life ==
In later life he served on the boards of Old Mutual and the National Bank of South Africa. He was knighted in 1916, and died at his Oak Valley farm in Elgin in 1918.
