= Elgin, South Africa =

Region in the Western Cape, South Africa

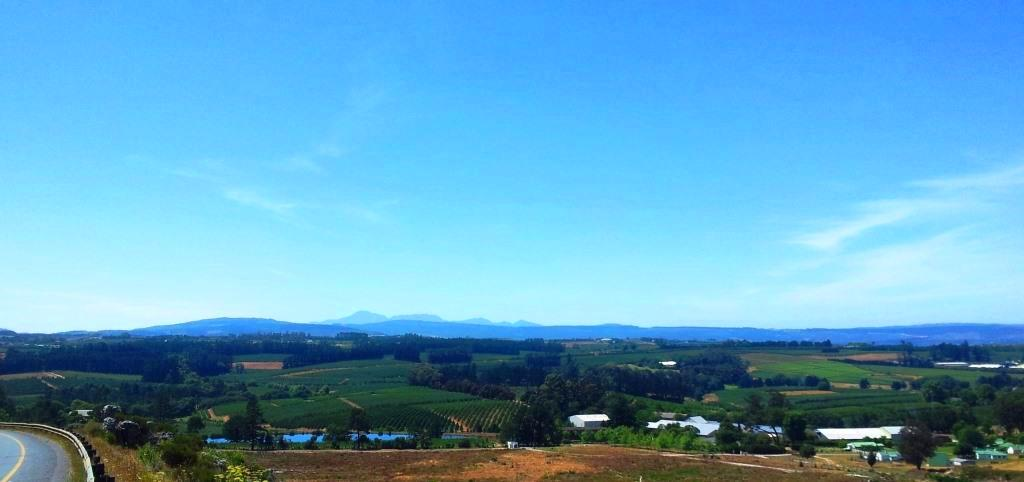
View over the Elgin valley from the west

Elgin is a large, lush area of land, circled by mountains, in the Overberg region of South Africa. This broad upland valley lies about 70 km southeast of Cape Town, just beyond the Hottentots Holland Mountains.

The Elgin region is centered on the town of Grabouw.

The Elgin Valley is one of the more intensively farmed districts of South Africa and produces 60% of the national apple crop. Consequently it is now known in South Africa as the place “where the apples come from”. However a recent shift in economic focus has led to Elgin also becoming one of South Africa's most notable and successful wine regions, with the coolest climate of any region in the country. Elgin wines and tourism have consequently become significant parts of the valley's economy.

== Deciduous fruit, Flowers and Wine ==
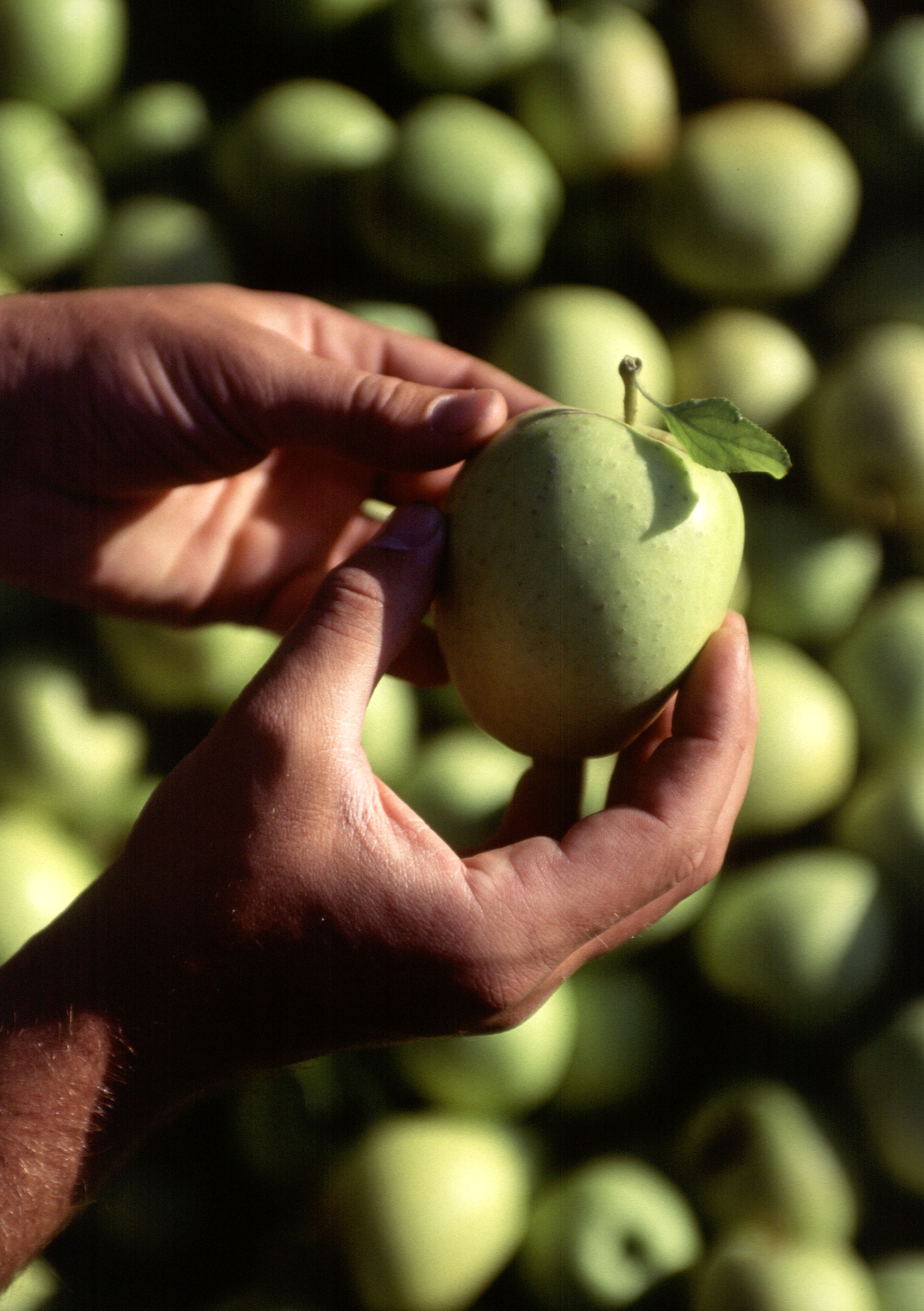
The Elgin valley is historically known for its deciduous fruit farming

Today the Elgin valley is renowned for its apple and pear orchards, its greenhouse cut flowers, its rose growing, and, increasingly, for the production of high quality, cool climate wines.

Over 40 percent of South Africa’s apple production is exported, and the Elgin Valley produces about 60 percent of the total annual apple crop of about 819,000 metric tonnes (2012 data). Industry and government export estimates can vary slightly. The United Kingdom is the top destination for South African apples, with Malaysia, Benin and Netherlands as the next largest importers of South African apples. Granny Smith and Golden Delicious were the top apple varieties exported in 2007/08. South Africa is said to be the only southern hemisphere country that produces a top quality Golden Delicious apple, a major advantage against competing exporting countries.

Elgin has more recently developed a large and thriving wine industry, and wines from the region have won several international awards. It is South Africa's coolest climate wine growing region. Other key geographic factors include its proximity to the Atlantic Ocean, the prevailing wind directions, and its altitude. The cool temperatures and plentiful winter rainfall mean that the Elgin basin has a set of conditions for wine growing which are markedly different to those in surrounding areas. Of the many varietals grown in the region, special attention has been paid to Sauvignon Blanc and Pinot noir.

The region is historically significant for South Africa's wine history also because it had one of the earliest movements towards Black ownership of vineyards and wineries. The Elgin winery Thandi was in fact the country's second post-Apartheid winery with significant black involvement (after New Beginnings in Paarl).

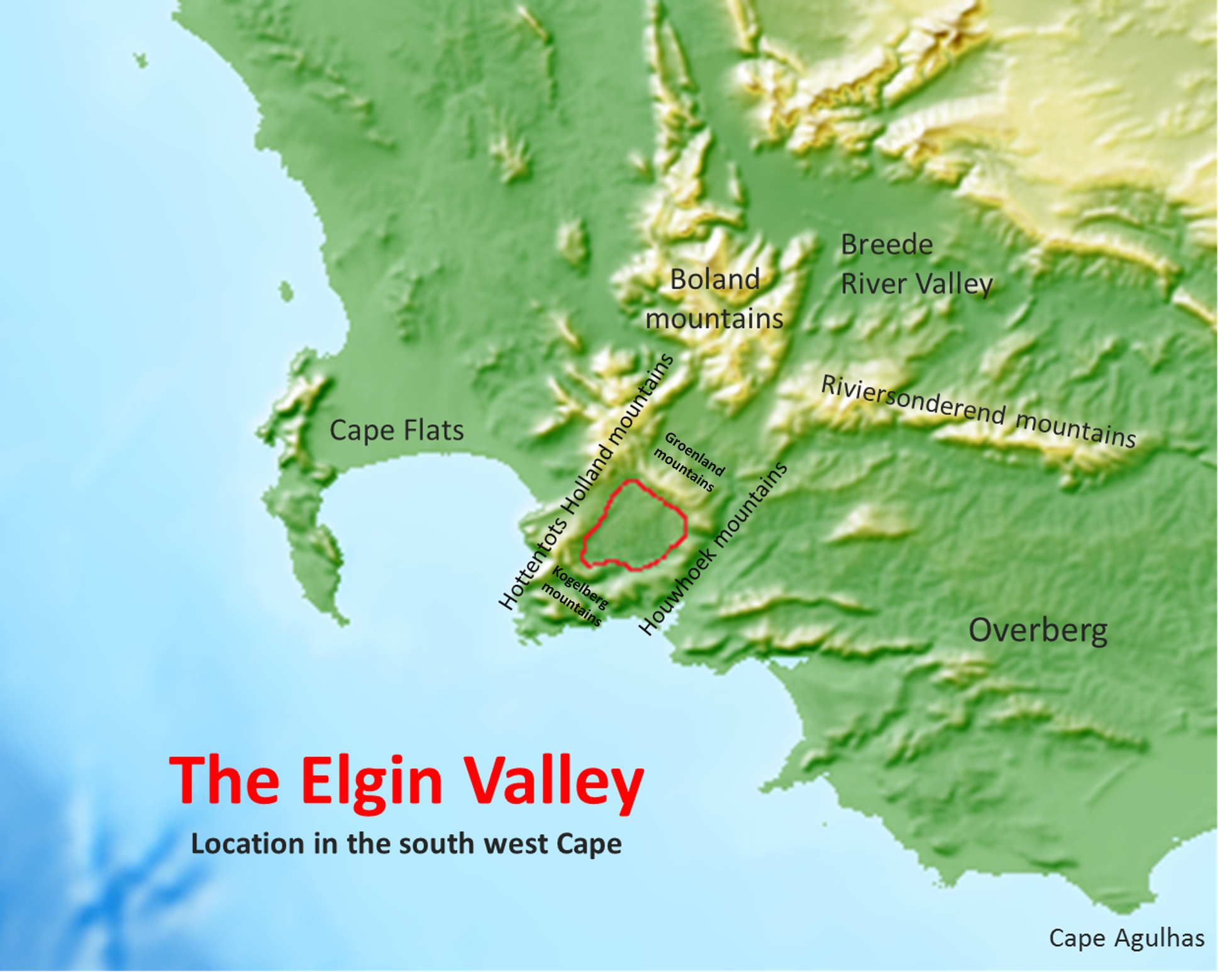
Location of the Elgin valley, to the east of Cape Town.

== Grabouw ==
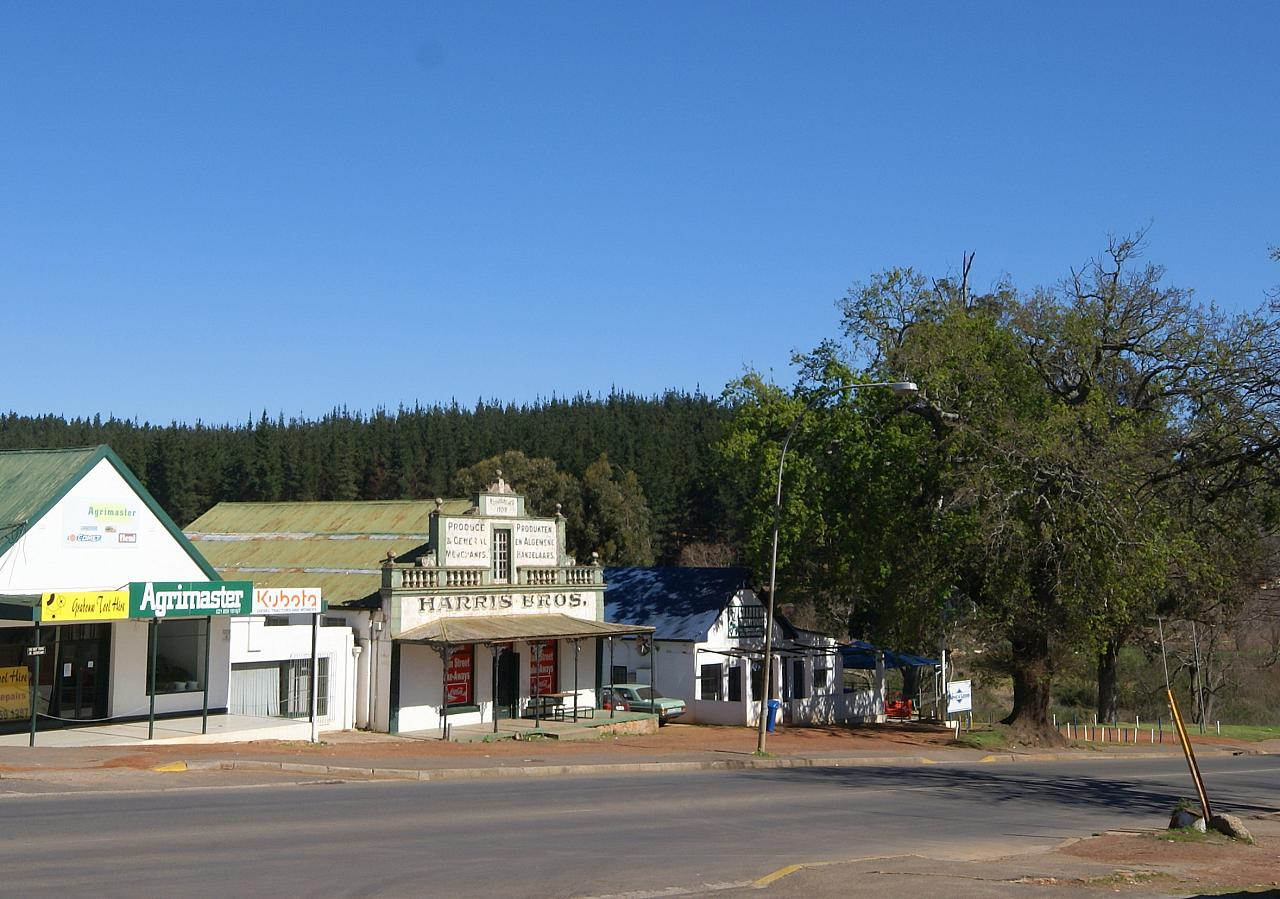
Old buildings on the outskirts of Grabouw

Today, the town of Grabouw, in the heart of the vast Elgin Valley, is the commercial centre for what is the largest single export fruit producing area in Southern Africa. It lies just to the north of the N2 highway, and has a population of 30,337 (2011).

Grabouw was created on the farm Grietjiesgat acquired on 22 November 1856 by Wilhelm Langschmidt, who named the place after Grabow, the village of his birth in Germany. His wife opened a small trading store and he was the bookkeeper. Later he sold parts of his farm and so began the farming community of Grabouw as it was later spelled. Langschmidt was the father of 23 children, including 3 sets of twins.

== Etymology ==
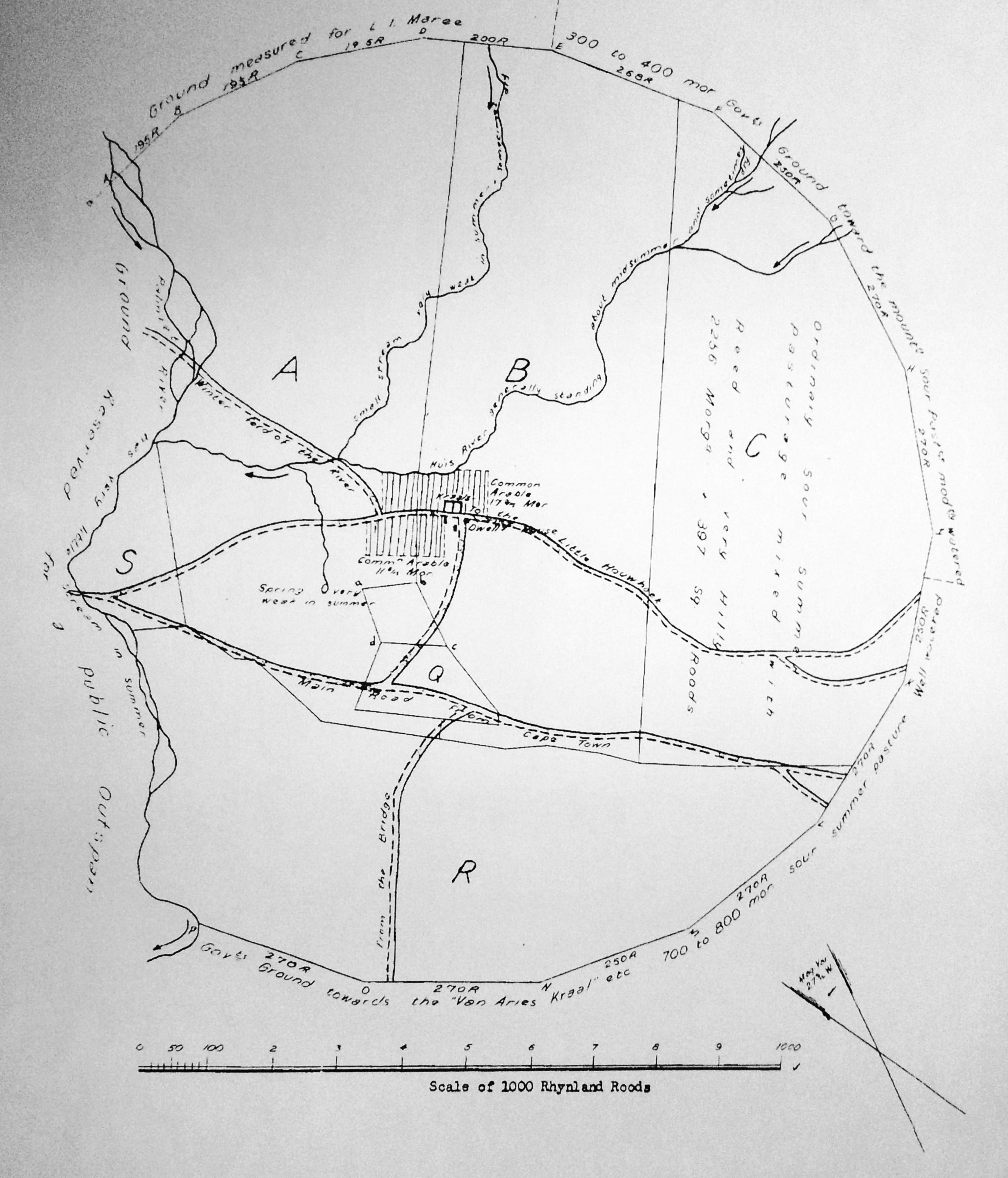
Early map of the farms around the Palmiet River, Elgin

In the late 1800s, a locally-born child named "Elgine Herold" was killed by snakebite near the Palmiet River. Her distraught father named the area of land "Elgin" in his daughter's memory, with support from other locals.

Two main events caused this name eventually to be used for the entire valley. Firstly, when the earliest railway was built through the area, it was found that this plot of land was the most suitable for a railway station, and the station was consequently also named "Elgin". For decades, this station provided the main connection between the people and produce of the valley, and the outside world. The name therefore became known around the world due to Elgin's famous agricultural produce. Secondly, two young brothers had bought a small plot of land here named "Glen Elgin" in 1903, where they grew vegetables. The Molteno brothers were partially responsible for revolutionising the region's deciduous farming industry and, in an unusual move in the 1950s, they ordered that their vast "Glen Elgin" farming enterprise was to be divided up and returned "...to Elgin's farmworkers and inhabitants for their own use." The name "Elgin" thereby gained a certain significance, as the name by which some of the region's land first began to be shared with the majority.

A range of other names were applied for the region, or parts of the region, over the course of its history. The original Chainouqua Khoikhoi names for the various parts of the valley were unfortunately not well recorded. Early colonial era names included the Dutch name "Groenland" ("Greenland"), used variously for the Groenland mountains to the north, and sometimes for the low-lying area to the south. The name "Grietjiesgat", after the farm owned by the settler Wilhelm Langschmidt, was used for parts of the valley, including the area where the modern town of Grabouw is located. Yet another early name was "Koffiekraal", after the spot where settlers unhitched oxen from the wagons, between Bot River and Palmiet River on the Cape Town to Caledon road. Overall, there was inconsistency in the naming of the different land-forms of the region.

By the middle of the 20th century, there was widespread standardisation of the naming, so that the names became popularly recognised as "Elgin" for the low-lying farming valley to the south; "Groenland" for the green mountainous area to the north; and "Grabouw" for the town.

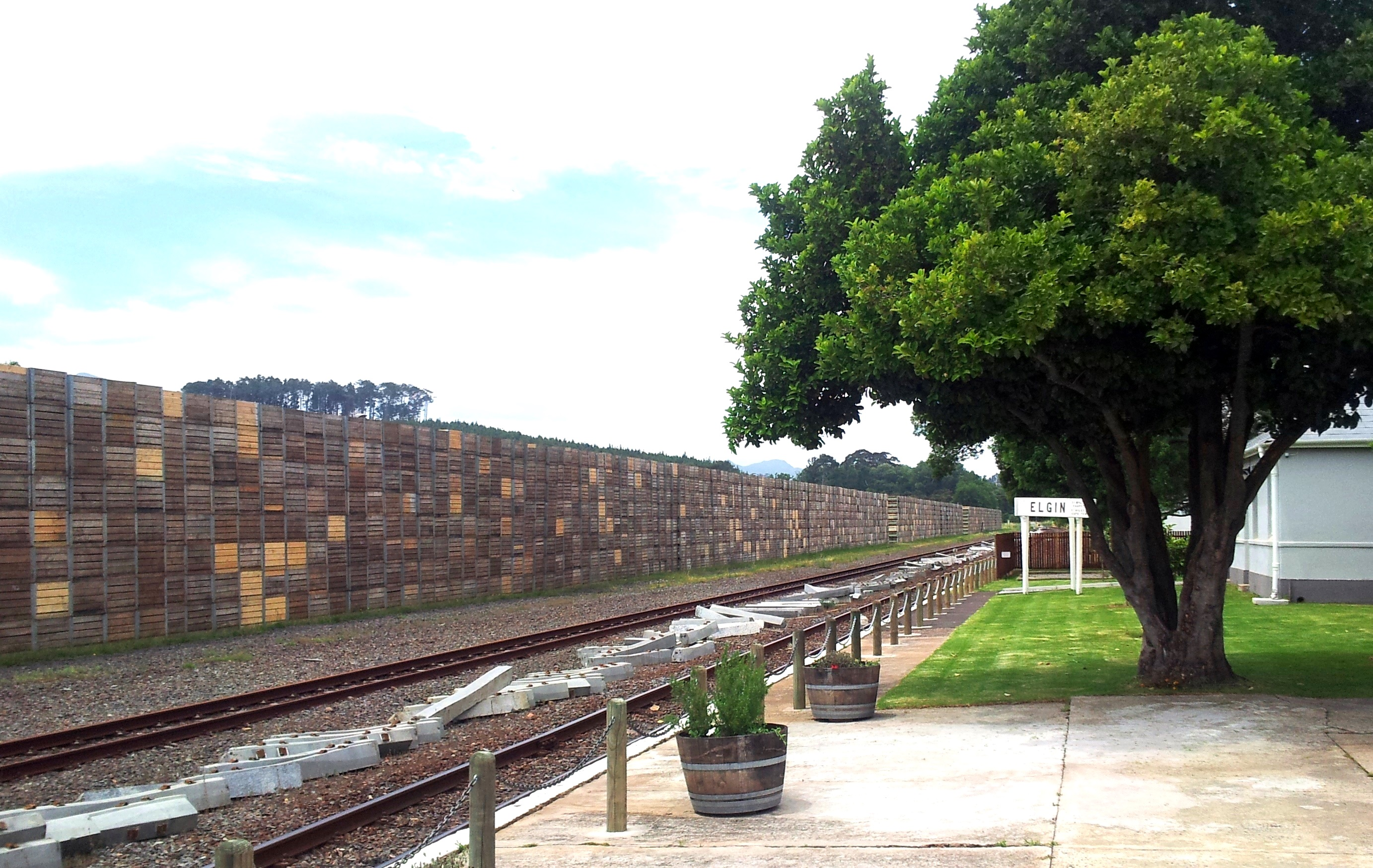
The original Elgin Railway Station

== History and development of the Elgin valley ==
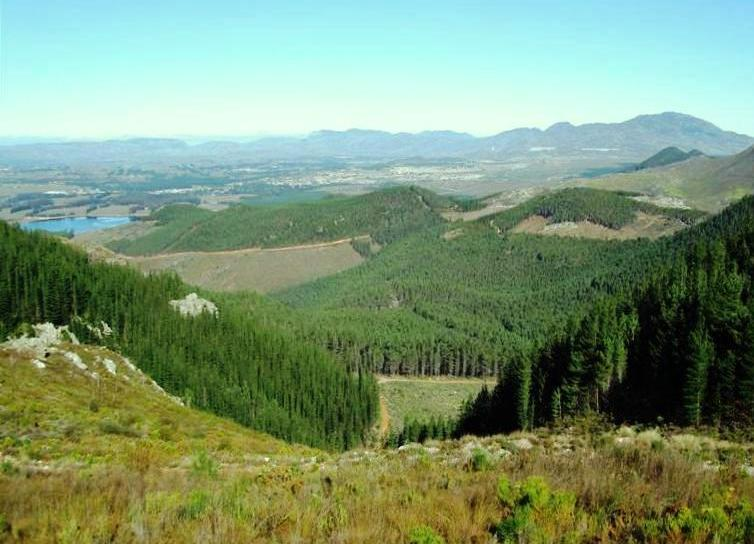
View into the Elgin valley.

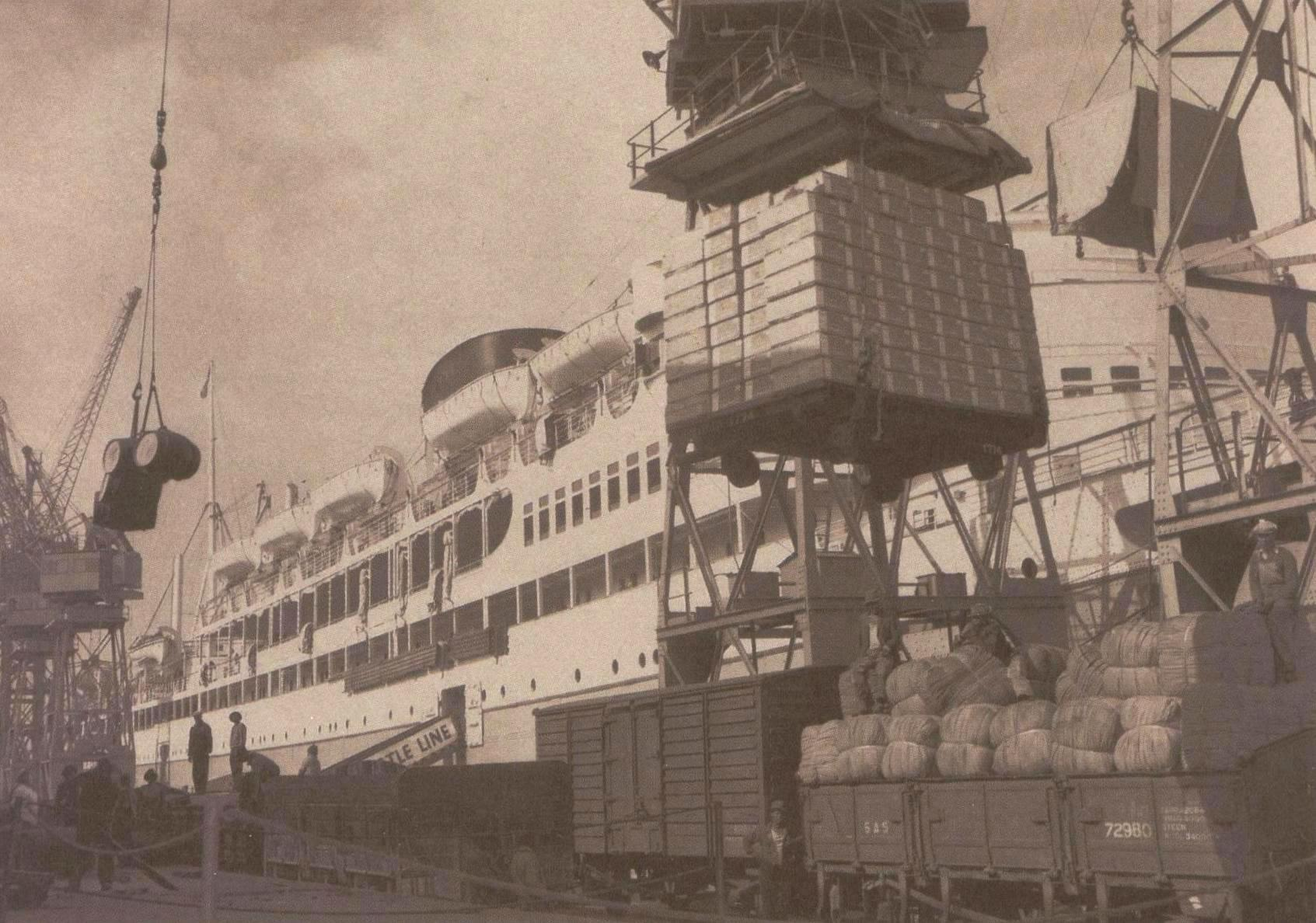
Elgin produce being loaded for export at Cape Town harbour.

The original inhabitants of the area were the Khoikhoi pastoralists and the San hunter gatherers. The indigenous people of the region, the Chainouqua Khoi, inhabited a large area on both sides of the Hottentots Holland Mountains. They traded with early European settlers, but were later dispossessed from their lands by the Dutch colonists, who began to move into the area in the late 1600s.

After displacing the Chainouqua Khoi, the colonists divided up the Chainouqua land into farms, and the region remained a relatively underdeveloped backwater for many centuries. Several waves of settlers arrived in the valley, after the initial Dutch colonists. Small numbers of British settlers arrived from the 19th century. Other diverse groups of settlers arrived in smaller numbers, including even groups of Italian prisoners of war. However demographically, the valley remained predominantly Afrikaans speaking, like the majority of the greater Overberg area. Similarly, land remained in the hands of a minority of farmers, while the majority of the region's inhabitants remained landless.

The development of the region changed substantially in the early 20th century, with the arrival of several influential families who had an enormous effect on Elgin.

Sir Antonie Viljoen, an Afrikaans medical doctor, bought a farm named Oak Valley Estate in the Elgin Valley in 1898. He spent much of the next few years under house arrest on his farm as he was captured by the British soon after signing up as a medical officer with the Boer army. His internment on Oak Valley was only granted on condition that he paid for the services of two British soldiers to guard him for the duration of the war. Antonie Viljoen was a farmer extraordinaire growing everything from grape vines to potatoes. Amongst his many farming achievements were the purchase of the first deciduous fruit trees in the Elgin valley. These were initially grown and maintained by his farm labourers, mostly as their own private project. However they constituted the first known deciduous orchard in the region, and Antonie Viljoen's farm workers deserve the honour of being the first true deciduous fruit farmers of Elgin.

In 1903 an Italian South African family named Molteno began farming in the area. Two friends of Dr Viljoen, the young brothers Edward and Harry Molteno initially bought a small plot of land named "Glen Elgin", near the modern Elgin railway station, where they grew vegetables. They soon started growing deciduous fruit though, and built up a vast fruit farming enterprise that spanned the entire valley. Charismatic and eccentric, they long dominated the fruit export industry but later left their enormous network of farms, as a trust, to be broken up, distributed, and used for the benefit of the farm workers and the region's inhabitants.

These early farming groups had a relatively inclusive and progressive effect on the Cape's conservative farming society. Sir Antonie was an MP in the Cape Parliament and, together with fellow MP James Molteno, he launched the first movement to give women of all races the right to vote, in 1907. Another progressive local entrepreneur who had an enormous influence on the valley was Kathleen Murray, who was a leader in the Black Sash among other political activities.

In 1966, on Applethwaite farm, the Franco-Italian immigrant Edmond Lombardi created and introduced to the market a 100% apple-juice beverage, free of additives and preservatives, known as Appletiser. Appletiser is now owned by SAB Miller and is sold across Europe, Asia, and North America.

The history of much of Elgin's economic development is recorded in the Elgin Apple Museum. This was founded in 1972 in a historic old cottage on the banks of the Palmiet River.

== See also ==
- Overberg
- Elgin Apple Museum
