= Palmiet River =

River in the Western Cape, South Africa

Coordinates: 34°19′52.36″S 18°59′26.36″E

Palmiet River Palmietrivier
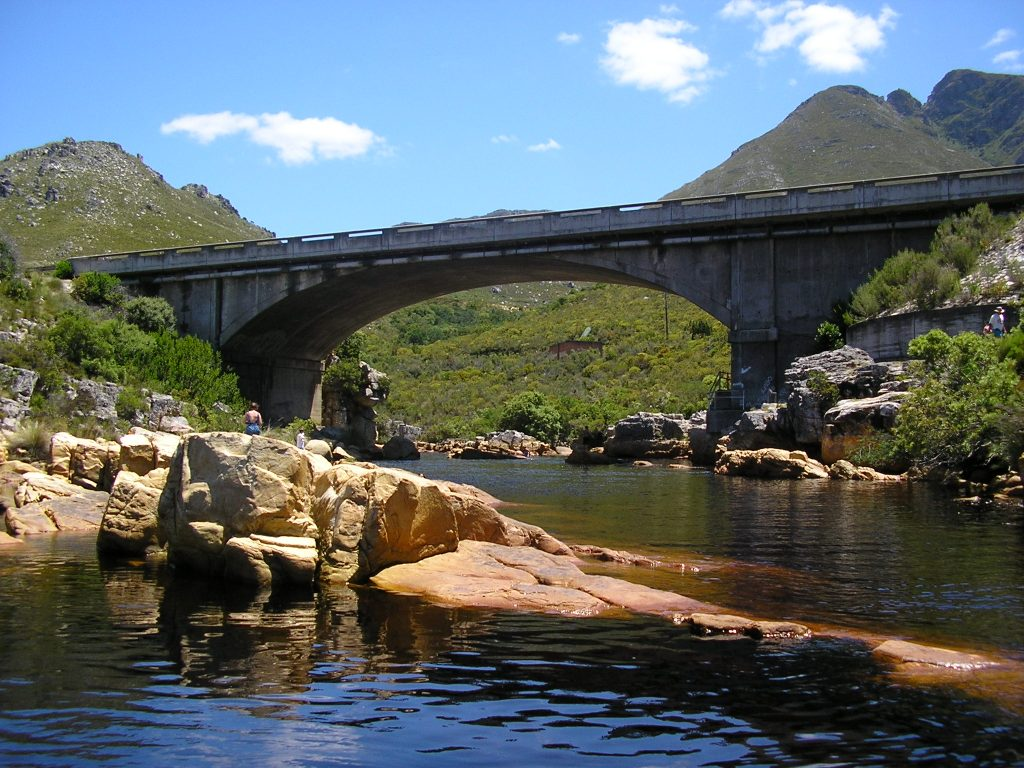
- Bridge over the Palmiet River between Betty's Bay and Kleinmond

Location
- Country: South Africa
- State: Western Cape

Physical characteristics
- Source: Kogelberg
  - location: Western Cape
- Mouth
  - location: Atlantic Ocean
  - elevation: 0 m (0 ft)
- Basin size: 500 km^{2} (190 sq mi)

Palmiet River (Afrikaans: Palmietrivier) is a river located in the Western Cape province of South Africa. The Palmiet River is a typical Western Cape river, experiencing winter rainfall and it is important for the Western Cape Water Supply System. It has a small catchment area of 500 km2, flows through the expanse of the Elgin Valley, and reaches the ocean through an estuary.

This river has six irrigation and hydro-power dams along its length, and provides water for agricultural and industrial uses, as well as to the city of Cape Town. It is unclear why there has been an apparent increase in flow over the last 30 years.

This river is named after the plant known as Palmiet (Prionium serratum) and should not be confused with the Palmiet River near Durban, or the Palmiet River which is a tributary of the Keurbooms River.

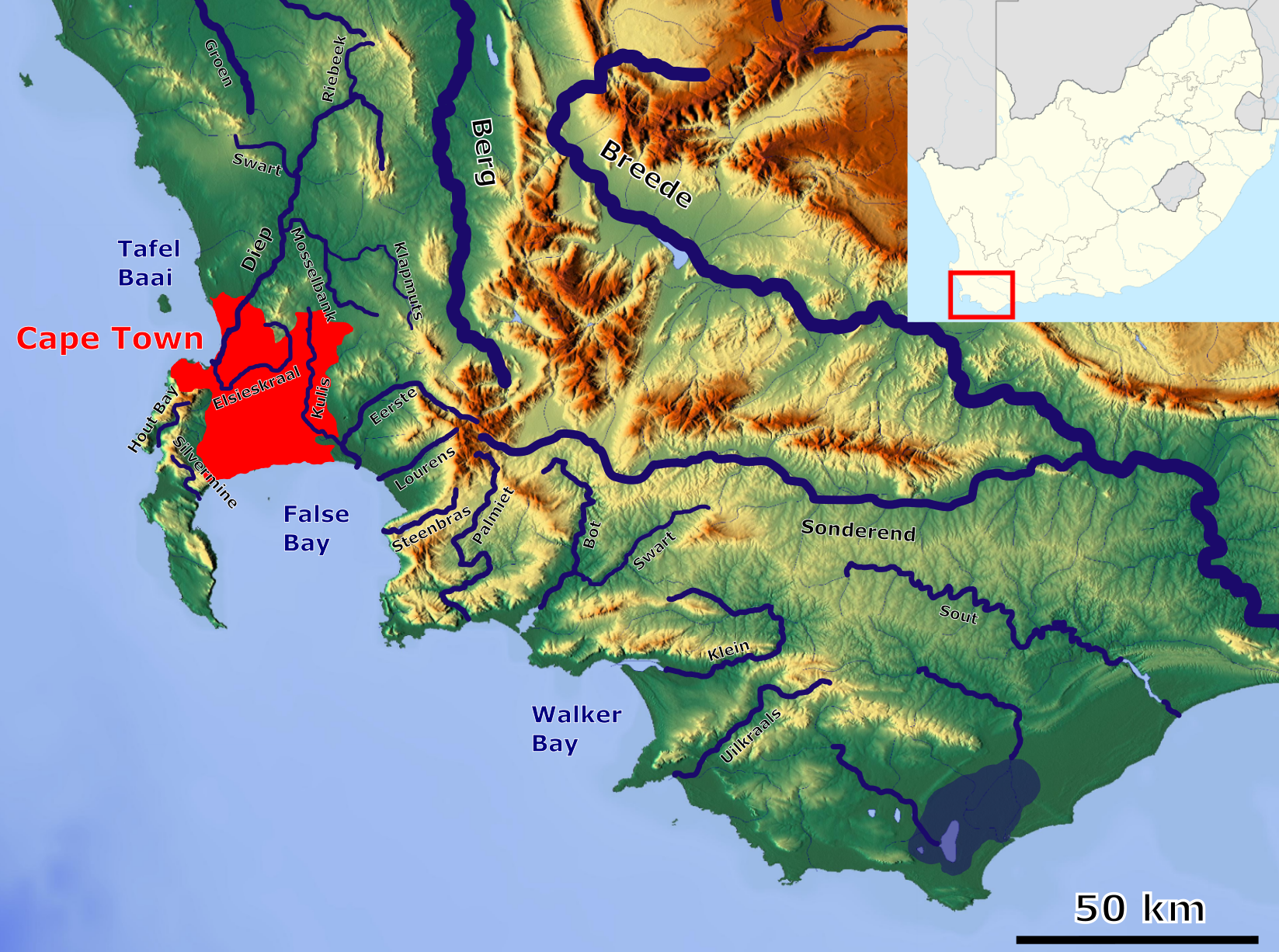
The rivers of the Cape region with the Palmiet River (centre)

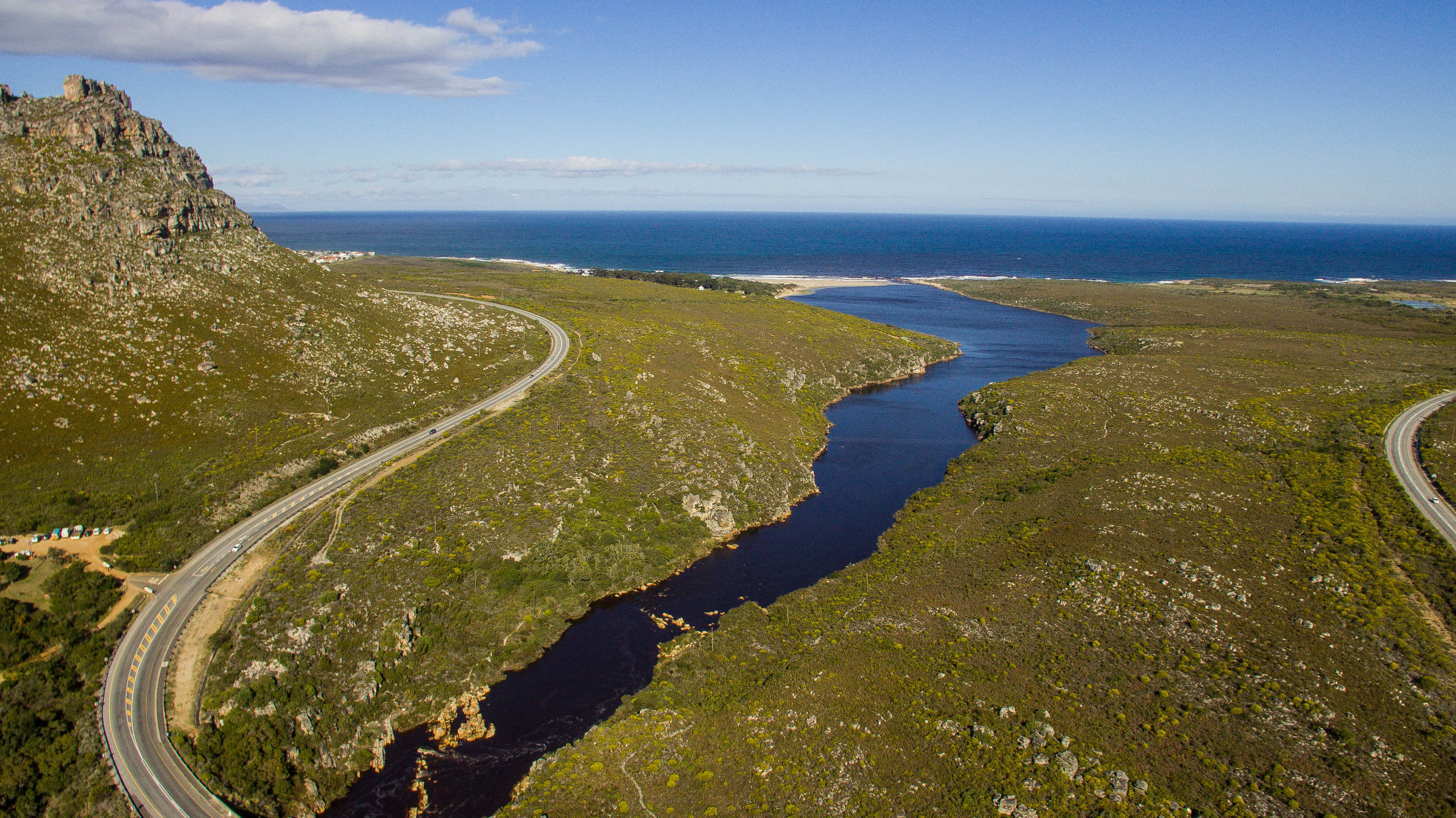
An aerial photograph of the mouth of the Palmiet River in Kleinmond as it flows into the Atlantic Ocean.

== Dams in this River ==
- Applethwaite Lake
- Arieskraal Dam
- Eikenhof Dam
- Kogelberg Dam
- Nuweberg Dam
- Transpalmiet Dam

== See also ==
- Elgin, Western Cape
- Breede Water Management Area
- List of drainage basins of South Africa
- List of rivers of South Africa
- Palmiet Pumped Storage Scheme
