= Luvubu and Letaba Water Management Area =

Luvubu and Letaba Water Management Area in South Africa includes major South African rivers. The area is also known as "Levubu and Letaba Water Management Area (coded: 2)" and "Luvuvhu and Groot Letaba WMA". The WMA includes the following rivers: Mutale River, Luvuvhu River and Letaba River, and covers these dams:

- Albasini Dam, Luvuvhu River
- Dap Naudé Dam, Broederstroom River
- Ebenezer Dam, Letsitele River
- Hans Merensky Dam, Ramadipa River
- Magoebaskloof Dam, Politsi River
- Middle Letaba Dam, Middle Letaba River
- Nandoni Dam, Levhuvhu River
- Nsami Dam, Nsama River
- Tzaneen Dam, Groot Letaba River
- Vergelegen Dam, Politsi tributary
- Vondo Dam, Mutshindudi River

== Boundaries ==
Tertiary drainage regions A91, A92, B81 to B83 and B90.

== See also ==
- Water Management Areas
- List of reservoirs and dams in South Africa
- List of rivers of South Africa
- List of Water Management Areas
