= Maculele =

Maculele, Maculelê or Makulele may refer to:

- Makuleke, Makulele Area, Makuleke Region, or Pafuri Triangle of the Kruger National Park
- Makulele (people), Makuleke, people living in Pafuri Triangle
- Maculelê (dance), an Afro-Brazilian dance and martial art
