= Lanner Gorge =

Gorge in the far north of Kruger National Park, South Africa

Lanner Gorge, Makuleke Area, Kruger National Park
- IUCN category II (national park)
- Location within Limpopo
- Location: Limpopo, South Africa
- Nearest city: Tshipise, South Africa
- Coordinates: 22°26′19″S 31°08′48″E
- Area: about 11 kilometres long
- Established: Incorporated into Kruger Park 1969 returned to Makuleke people 1998
- Governing body: National Park Service and Makuleke People

The Lanner Gorge is located in the far North of the Kruger National Park. It forms the boundary between the Kruger National Park to the South and the Makuleke Concession to the North. It was carved by the Luvuvhu River and is at some points more than 150 m deep.

== Description ==
Lanner Gorge is approximately 11 km long and is carved into sandstones and shales.

== Geology ==
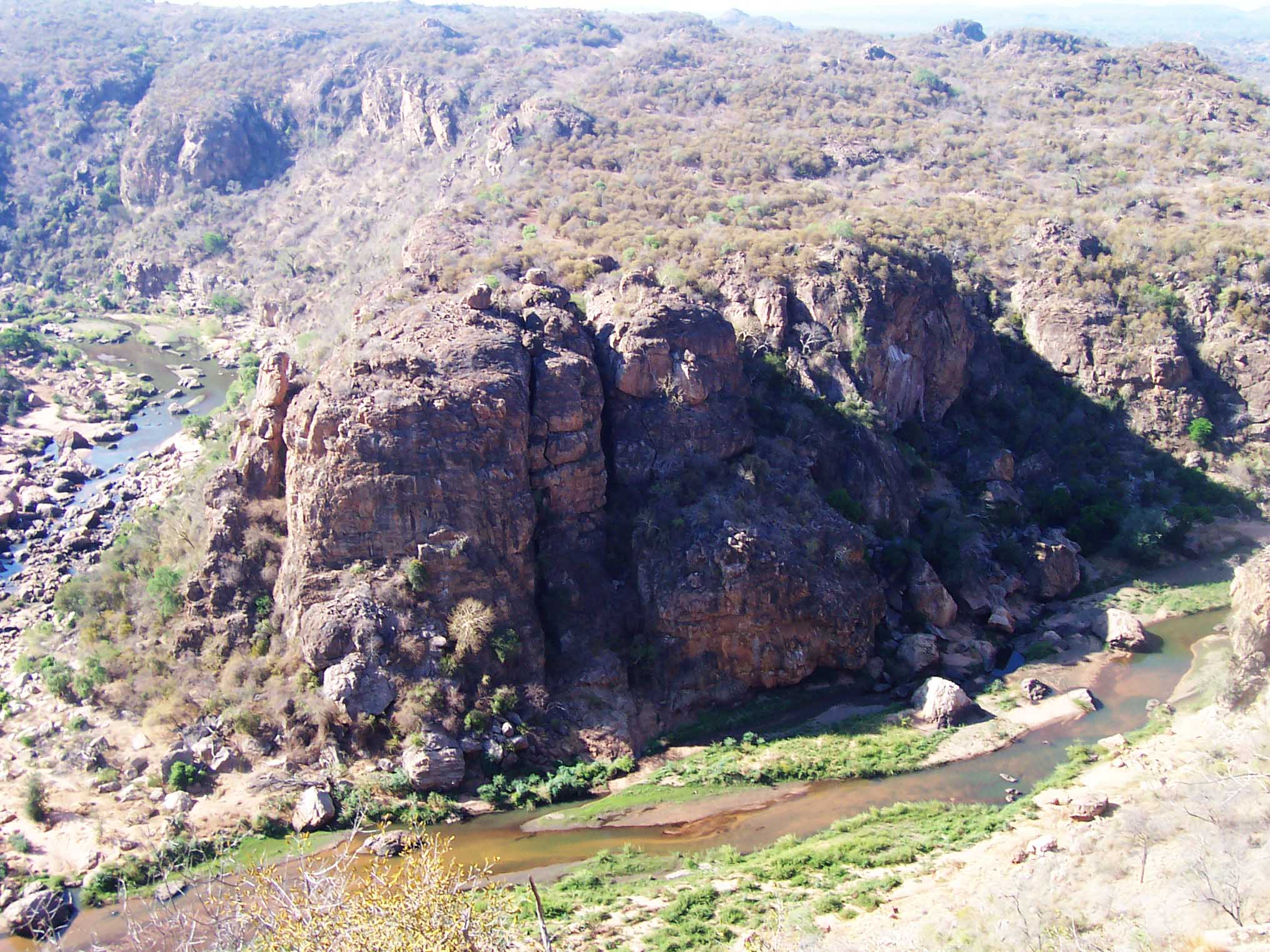
Lanner Gorge from the so-called "Lookout" point on the Makuleke side, one of the highest points in the Gorge.

The uppermost rocks are gravels which are thought to be Cretaceous in age while the basal shales are thought to be Permian in age. The majority of the walls appear to be composed of Triassic and Jurassic aged sandstones formed under arid conditions.

The Luvuvhu river has eroded through the sandstones and shales and formation is still active as is evidenced by the many collapsed boulders in the river bed.

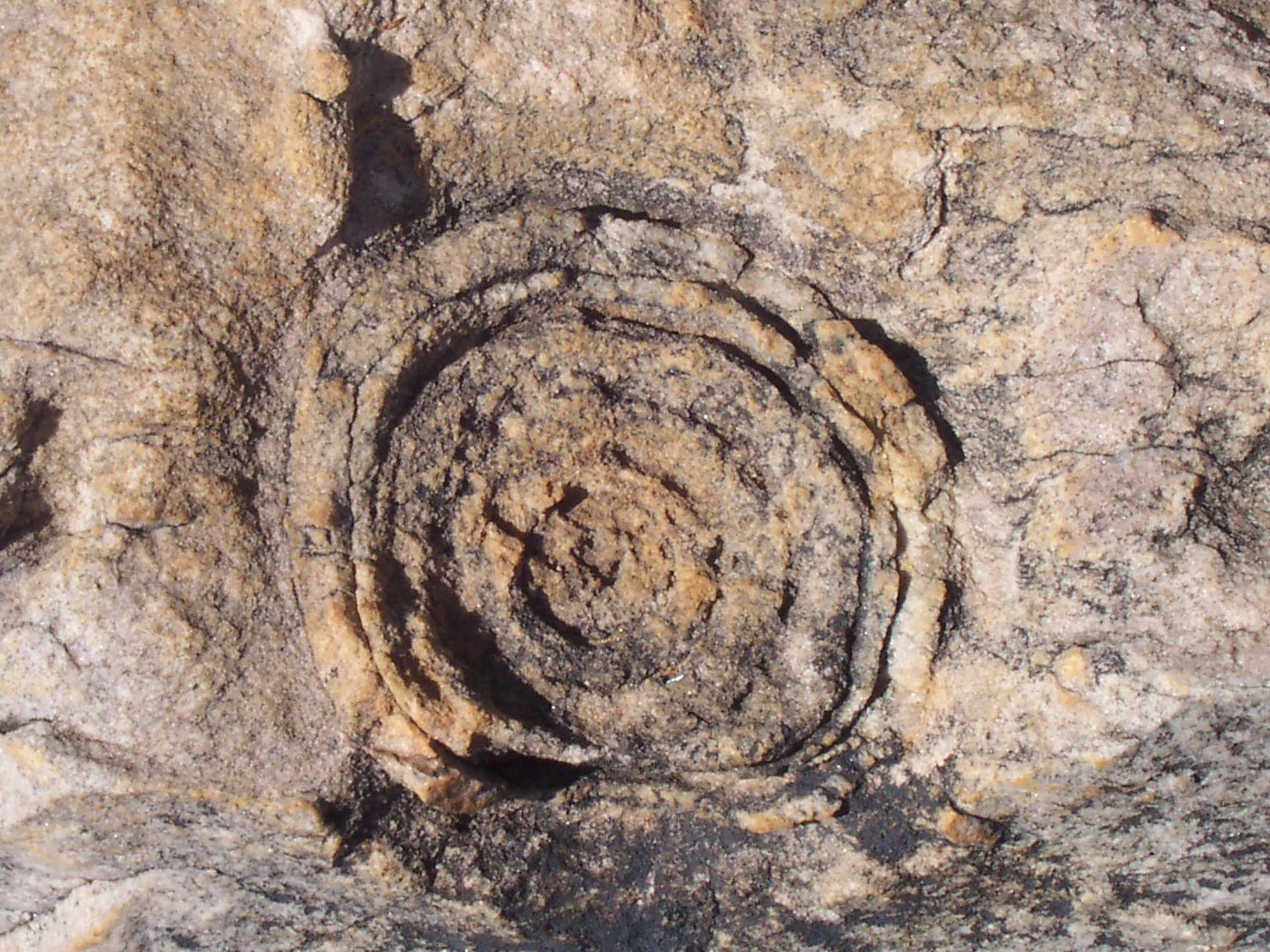
Desert rose in the Jurassic sandstones of the walls of Lanner Gorge.

Dinosaur fossils have been discovered in the walls of Lanner Gorge and rocks in the surrounding region. Desert roses are also common in the Triassic and Jurassic-aged rocks.

The precise geological age of the gorge is unknown, however, the absence of Early Stone Age occupation in the many caves and shelters in the gorge suggests that the gorge may be relatively young and have formed in the last 2 million years.

== Flooding ==
As the Luvuvhu River is still a young, active river, flooding is common and the gorge is often cluttered with debris such as fallen trees.

== Access ==
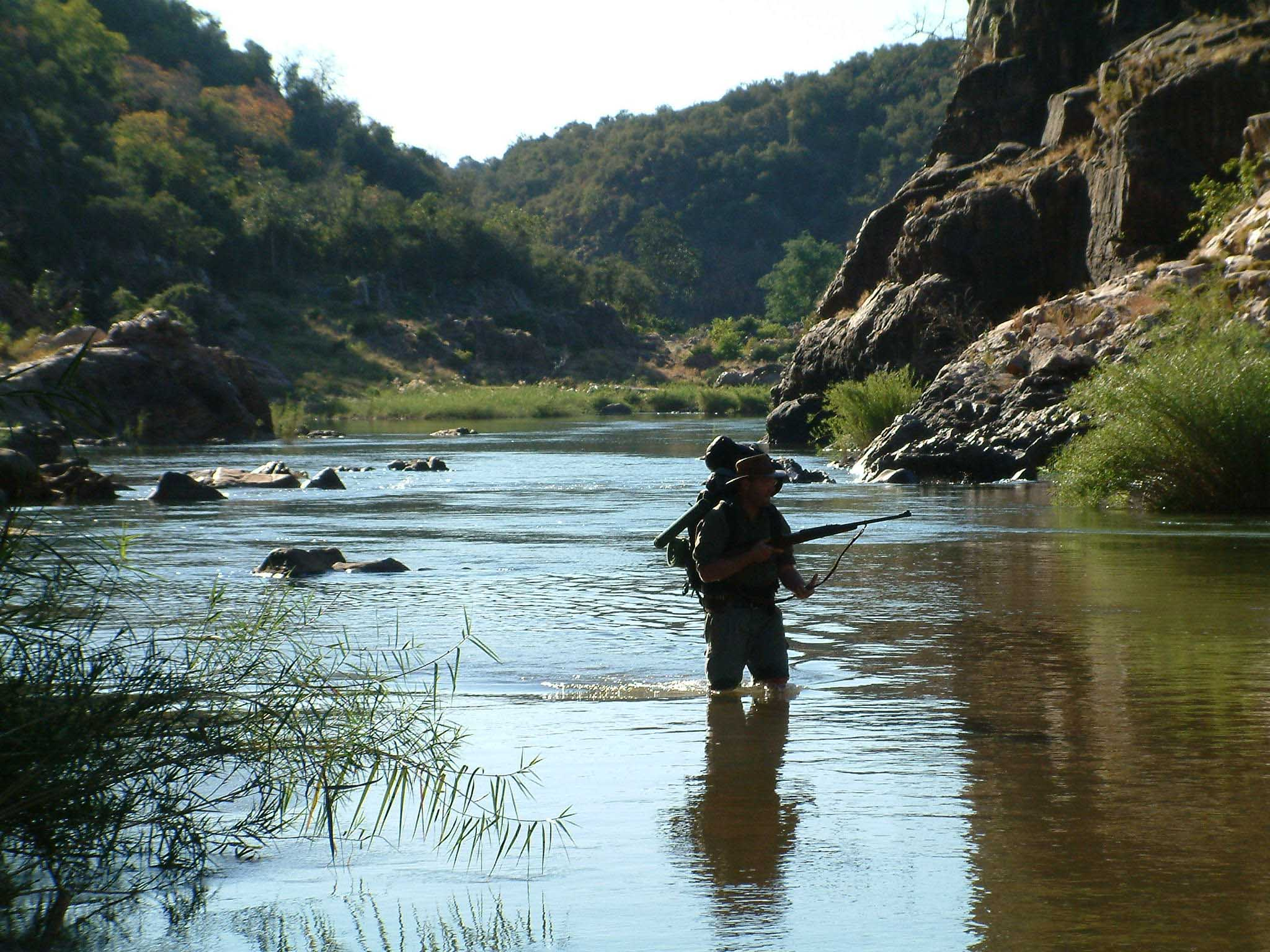
Crossing the Luvuvhu River in Lanner Gorge near the western end. Crocodiles and hippos are a constant threat.

Access to the gorge is extremely limited due to its steepness and its status as a wilderness area of Kruger. Nevertheless, some walking trails approach and enter the gorge from both the Makuleke area as well as from the Kruger side.

== Wildlife ==
The gorge holds a variety of wildlife including abundant crocodiles, hippos, hyraxes, baboons, leopards and other small game. Elephants and buffalo and other larger game are common at both ends of the gorge, but have difficulty in accessing the central region due to the steep walls.

There is an abundance of birds including raptors such as the black eagle and lanner falcon - after which the gorge is named.

== Other interesting facts ==
- The archeological site of Thulamela is located just outside the eastern end of the gorge.
- Legend has it that a former chief used to throw criminals and enemies to their death from the highest points of the gorge.
