= Thulamela =

Archaeological site in South Africa

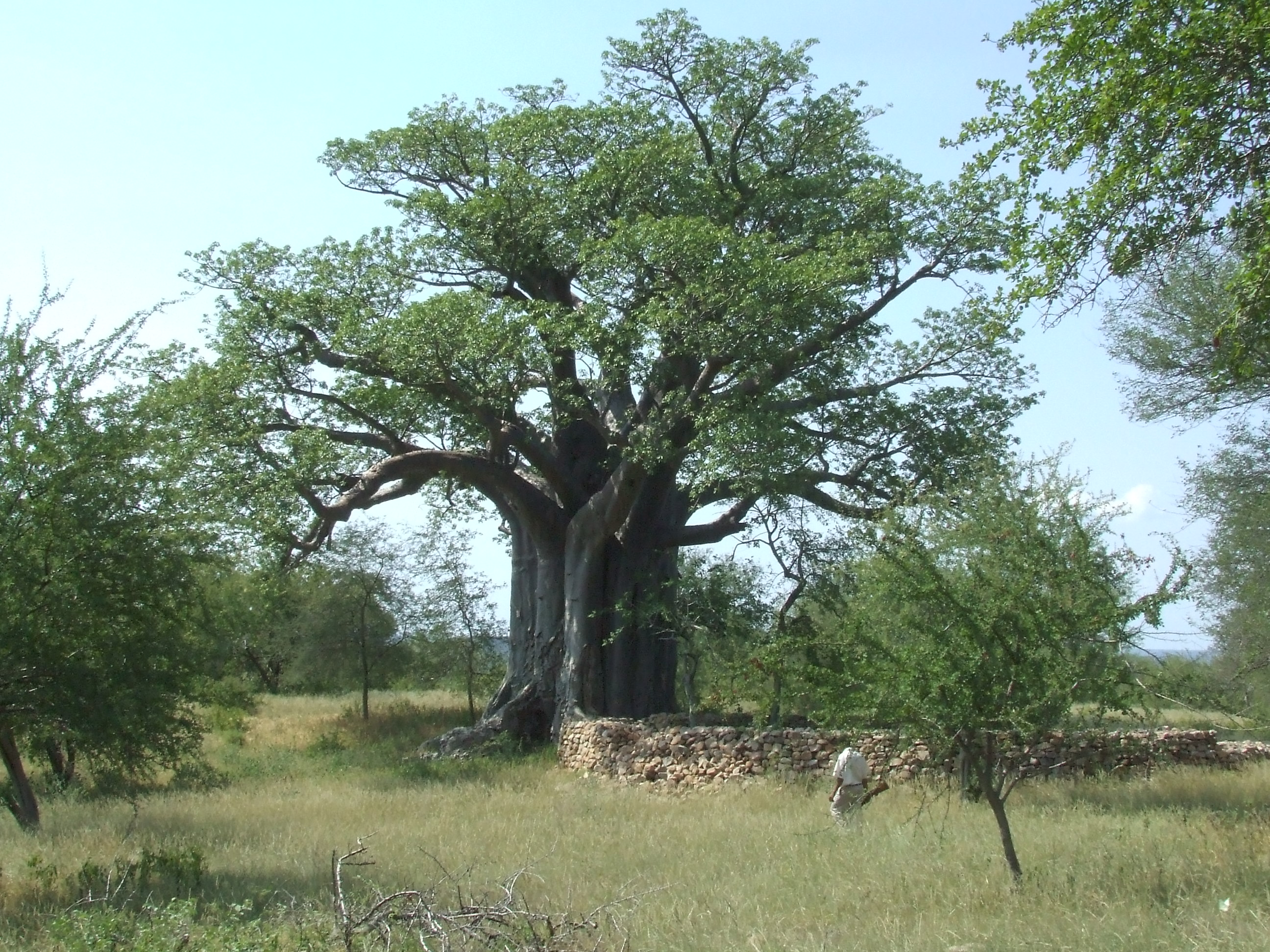
- A rebuilt enclosure at Thulamela

- Thulamela
- 22°26′00″S 31°11′51″E
- Type: Cultural
- Location: Kruger National Park

Thulamela is the most dramatic of around 300 archaeological sites identified in Kruger National Park. It is located on heights south of the Levubu River offering a panoramic view. Sidney Miller led excavations from December 1993 to July 1995, and the site has also been partially reconstructed.

The opening of the rebuilt Thulamela was attended by a hundred guests, including then Minister of Environmental Affairs and Tourism Pallo Jordan and then SANParks chairman, the late Dr. Enos John Mabuza. The name Thulamela comes from a portmanteau of thulwi ("mound") and mela ("growing") in references to the tall anthills in the area.

A kingdom was formed at Thulamela in the 13th century, near the confluence of the Limpopo and Levubu rivers, which specialised in fashioning objects out of smelted copper, gold, and iron, such as gold jewellery, hoes, harpoons and blades. It coexisted and interacted with the Mapungubwe, Great Zimbabwe, and Khami states. It had close relations with the Kingdom of Butua, and Butua's collapse in the 17th century into civil war likely led to Thulamela's isolation from regional networks, and its abandonment soon after.

The graves of a 16th-century king and queen were unearthed in the 1990s excavations. Archaeologists named them King Ingwe and Queen Losha, and their castle was estimated to house 1,000 people. Dwellings along the ruined walls on the hillsides beyond could regularly have housed 2,000.

Similar village ruins can be found in the Mateke Hills on the other side of the Limpopo River in Zimbabwe. The Makahane Cliffs can be found in the same area of Kruger National Park, northeast of the Punda Maria Gate near the Levubu, and was also a Vhalembethu settlement.

The families of the Kingdom Thulamela:

1. Makahane — also known as Shagala, Nephawe, Mataji (Matandze)
2. Pafuri — known as Makushu (Makush)
3. Maphaha Xikumbu (Xikumbu) — son of Thonga Tshilimandila in Phalaborwa.
4. Shilowa or Selowa — also known as Machete, Mmopa, Mushiana, Vudogwe, Mbwashishi, Senyolo or Vhadau Vha Damani

Visitors to the park can book tours from Punda Maria Camp up to Thulamela.

== See also ==
- Great Zimbabwe
- Kingdom of Mapungubwe
- Makuleke tribe
- Shingwedzi

== Sources ==
- Miller, Sidney Mears (2018). Thulamela: The Lost Gold of the Vha Venda.
