= Dap Naudé Dam =

Coordinates: 23°48′37″S 29°58′07″E

- Interactive map of Dap Naudé Dam
- Official name: Dap Naudé Dam
- Location: Polokwane, South Africa
- Opening date: 1958
- Operators: Department of Water Affairs and Forestry

Dam and spillways
- Impounds: Broederstroom River
- Height: 23 m
- Length: 192 m

Reservoir
- Creates: Dap Naudé Dam Reservoir
- Total capacity: 1 900 000 m³
- Surface area: 28 ha

Dap Naudé Dam is dam on the Broederstroom River, near Polokwane, Limpopo, South Africa. It was established in 1958. It was named after David Joseph Naudé (Dap Naudé), an attorney who was born in Middelburg, South Africa in 1895.

The Dam has a surface area of 28 ha and when full provides the Dap Naude Dam Reservoir with 1.9 million cubic meters of water.

== See also ==
- List of reservoirs and dams in South Africa
- List of rivers of South Africa
