= Tshakhuma Dam =

Dam in Limpopo, South Africa

Coordinates: 23.032789°S 30.281845°E

Tshakhuma Dam is an embankment dam near Tshakhuma in Limpopo, South Africa. It was completed in 1990 and supplies water to the Tshakhuma Irrigation scheme. The reservoir has a capacity of 2,100,000 m^{3} (1,700 acre⋅ft).
