= Luvuvhu River =

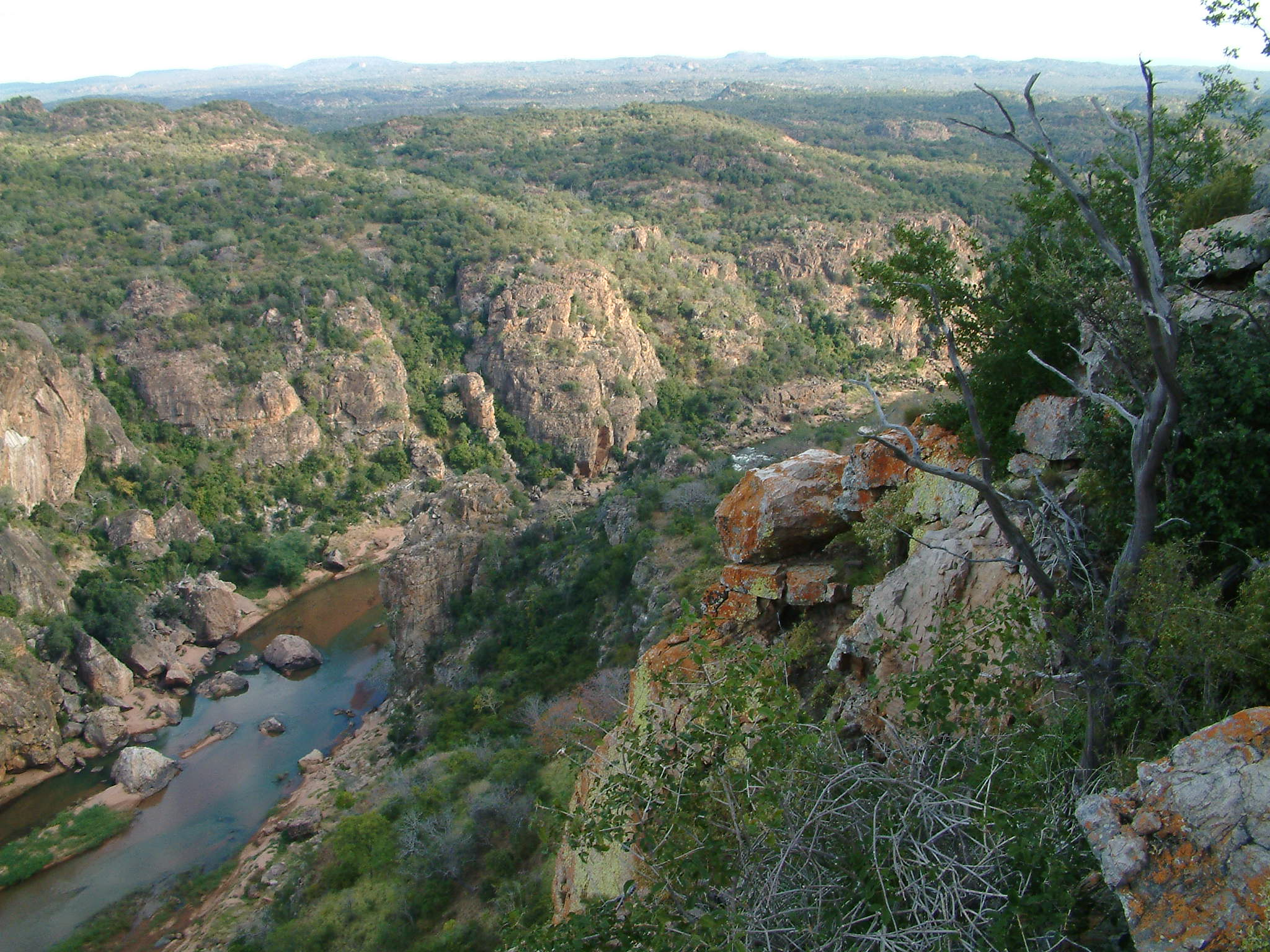
- The Luvuvhu River in Lanner Gorge, Pafuri

- Location of the Luvuvhu River's mouth
- Etymology: Either from the Venda Muvuvhu (hippopotamus), or Mvuvhu (Combretum kraussii), a species of tree growing on its banks
- Native name: Luvuvhu (Venda)

Location
- Country: South Africa
- State: Limpopo

Physical characteristics
- Source
  - location: Soutpansberg
- Mouth: Near Pafuri
  - location: Limpopo River, South Africa-Mozambique border
  - coordinates: 22°25′32″S 31°18′25″E
  - elevation: 203 m (666 ft)
- Length: 200 km (120 mi)
- Basin size: 4,826 km^{2} (1,863 sq mi)

Basin features
- River system: Limpopo River basin
- Tributaries
  - right: Dzindi River; Mutshindudi River; Mutale River

The Luvuvhu River (Note: Name variations: Levuvhu River, Levhuvhu River, Levubu River, Levuvu River.) (Tsonga: Rivubye; Venda: Luvuvhu), historically known as Pafuri River, is located in the northern Limpopo province of South Africa. Some of its tributaries, such as the Mutshindudi River and Mutale River rise in the Soutpansberg Mountains.

The Luvuvhu flows for about 200 km through a diverse range of landscapes before it joins the Limpopo River in the Fever Tree Forest area, near Pafuri in the Kruger National Park.

A Zambezi shark (Carcharhinus leucas) was caught at the confluence of the Limpopo and Luvuvhu Rivers in July 1950. Zambezi sharks tolerate fresh water and can travel far up rivers like the Limpopo. The river's crocodile population extends to its upper reaches at Thohoyandou.

== Dams ==
- Albasini Dam
- Mambedi Dam
- Tshakhuma Dam
- Damani Dam
- Nandoni Dam, previously known as the Mutoti Dam, in the middle section of the Luvuvhu River east of the confluence with the Dzindi River tributary and east of the town Thohoyandou
- Vondo Dam in the Mutshindudi River, a tributary
- Phiphidi Dam in the Mutshindudi

== See also ==
- Drainage basin A
- List of rivers of South Africa
- List of reservoirs and dams in South Africa
- Luvubu and Letaba Water Management Area
