= Albasini Dam =

- Interactive map of Albasini Dam
- Official name: Albasini Dam
- Location: Limpopo, South Africa
- Coordinates: 23°6′30″S 30°7′48.2″E
- Opening date: 1952
- Operator: Department of Water Affairs

Dam and spillways
- Impounds: Luvuvhu River
- Height: 34 m (112 ft)
- Length: 622 m (2,041 ft)

Reservoir
- Creates: Albasini Dam Reservoir
- Total capacity: 25,200,000 m^{3} (890,000,000 cu ft)
- Surface area: 350 ha (860 acres)

The Albasini Dam is a dam located just outside the town of Louis Trichardt, Limpopo Province, South Africa. The dam has a capacity of 25,200,000 cubic metres (890,000,000 cu ft), and a surface area of 3.572 square kilometres (1.379 sq mi). The wall is 34 metres (112 ft) high.

The dam was named after Italian explorer João Albasini (1813–1888).

For additional information with regard to fishing at Albasini Dam, visit Albasinidam.co.za

== See also ==
- Department of Water Affairs (South Africa)
- List of dams in South Africa
- List of rivers in South Africa
