= Makuleke tribe =

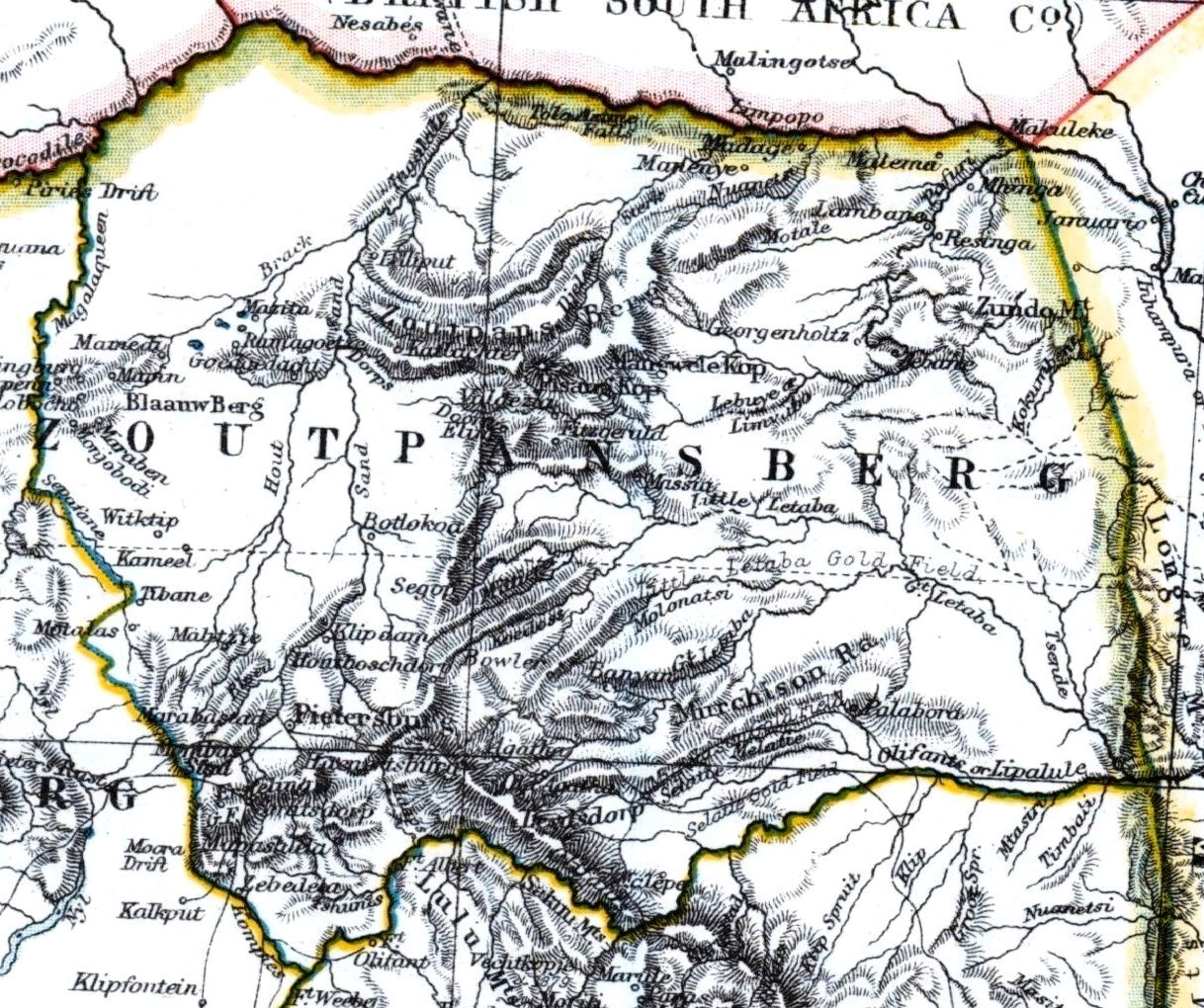
Makuleke region and other parts of the Maluleke Dynasty (including Mhinga, Risenga, Malema) as shown near the northeastern boundary of district Zoutpansberg, on a map of 1897

The Makuleke are a Tsonga tribe living in the Pafuri Triangle of South Africa at the confluence of the Luvuvhu river and Limpopo river in what is now the Kruger National Park. The Tsonga-speaking agricultural and fishing tribe settled the area in the seventeenth century with decentralized homesteads. When the park was created they were exiled outside the gates, but had title to their lands restored as part of post-apartheid restitution laws. There are about 12,000 members of the clan and they are part of an eco-tourism economic development with the land they received from the park.

The Makuleke tribe are part of the Maluleke Clan (Tsonga) who also include the Mhinga, Xikundu, Mulamula, Xigalo, Hlaniki and others. Historical records show that these people have been in the area of Phafuri and the other parts around the Kruger National Park well over a thousand years. These tribes, who have been living in parts of Mozambique and the Kruger National Park since arriving from the central parts of Africa around AD200, today form a majority among the Tsonga people of South Africa.

== History ==
The history of the Maluleke tribe (Maluleke) can be traced to the time of the Bantu expansion between 100AD and 200AD when African tribes experienced attacks from Arabs from the North of the Great Lakes. The Beja Tonga tribes migrated from those parts and re-established themselves in countries such as Tanzania, Zambia, and Mozambique. The Maluleke tribe is one of the first of the Beja Tonga tribes which emerged at around 500AD and formed part of the first Chopi and Tsonga Valenge groups in Mozambique and South Africa. The Maluleke tribe, together with their near-relatives, finally settled at the Limpopo river and parts of South Africa led by their tribal leader King Mashakadzi between the 1500s and middle 1600s. Harries (1987) indicates that the Maluleke tribe settled at the Kruger National Park which had not been claimed by any other African tribe and was outside the scope of European settlement throughout history; but by the 1890s their territory was incorporated into the European-led Transvaal Republic. This led to the Maluleke tribe being forcefully removed from the Kruger National Park by the Apartheid regime to make way for the establishment of the conservation area in 1969.

== Game Reserve Management ==
Under the new democracy of South Africa, the Maluleke tribe were afforded an opportunity to reclaim the land and filed a land-restitution claim, which they won. They negotiated with the South African National Parks organization, and reached a settlement under the Land Claims Court which they were given membership to the eco-tourism management of the area under the Maluleke Communal Property Association in 1998. The court order to recognize the Maluleke tribe as the rightful inhabitants of the land made this the first successful settlement of a land restitution claim involving a South African national park. The land restitution agreement includes the provision that the land of the Makuleke Region will be managed under a 20 to 50 year contractual agreement and thus it became the Maluleke Contractual Park. According to the contractual agreement, after the 20 years have elapsed either of the signatories can request for the Maluleke Region to be excluded from the demarcation of the Kruger National Park.
