= Mutshindudi River =

- Location within Limpopo Location within South Africa

Location
- Country: South Africa
- Province: Limpopo
- Town: Sibasa

Physical characteristics
- Mouth
  - coordinates: 22°56′45″S 30°20′7″E

The Mutshindudi River is a river in the Limpopo Province of South Africa, it originates in the Soutpansberg mountains. It is a right-hand tributary of the Levuvhu River. Its elevation is 534 metres above the sea level. It is about 50 km long and drops steeply from a high rain fall region at 1200m to a lowland valley at 450m altitude where it joins the Luvuvhu river, it is a small yet permanent river, supplying the domestic demand of the Thohoyandou municipal area. Many 20m wide and 80m long riffles and rapids are found here.

== Dams ==
=== Vondo Dam ===
Vondo Dam was built in 1982 on the Mutshindudi river near Thohoyandou and Sibasa. It was built to supply water to the Tate - Vondo Tea Estate.

== See also ==
- List of rivers in South Africa
