= Nandoni Dam =

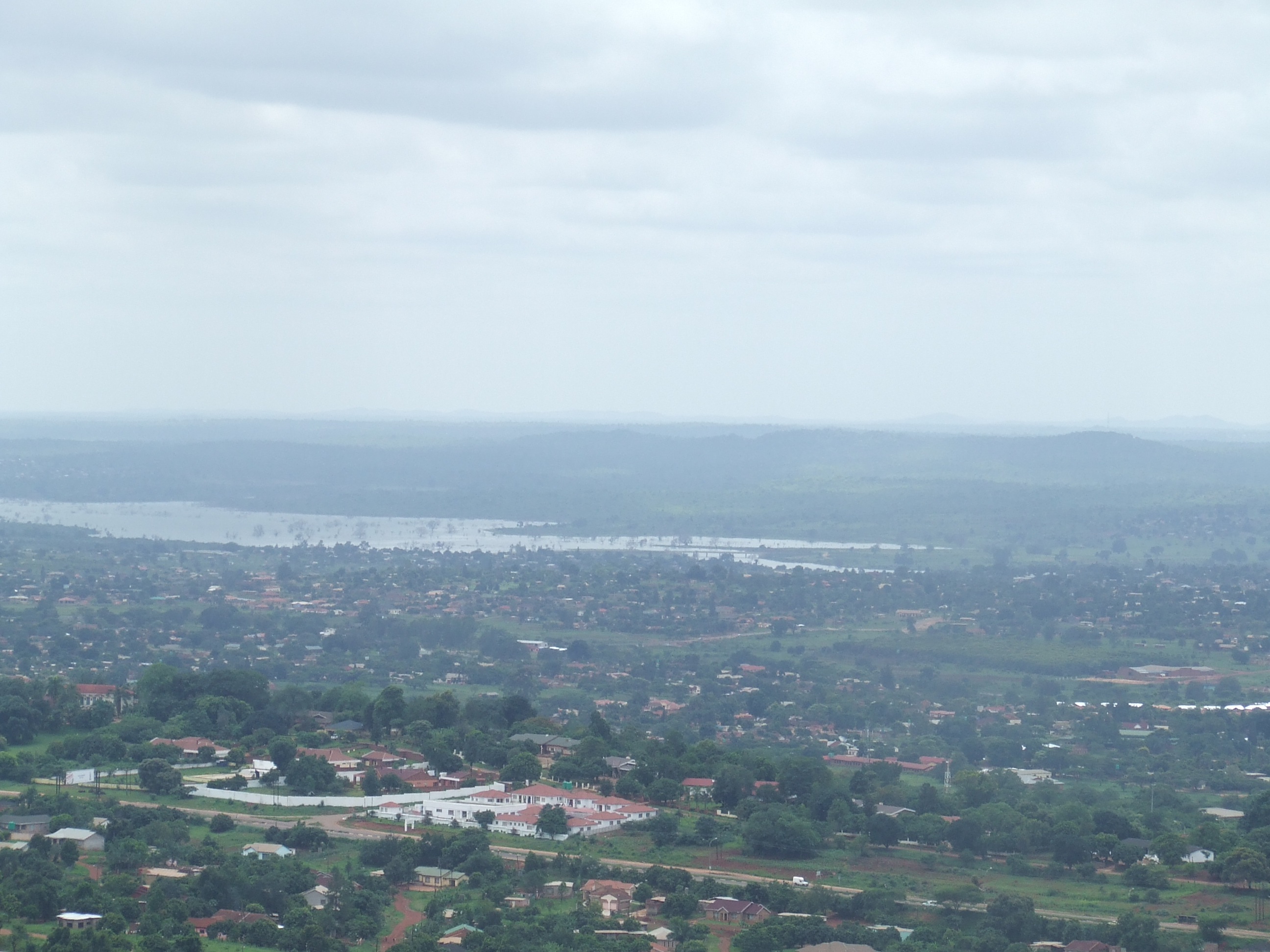
- Nandoni Dam, Thohoyandou
- Interactive map of Nandoni Dam
- Official name: Nandoni Dam
- Location: Limpopo, South Africa
- Coordinates: 22°59′20″S 30°36′27″E
- Opening date: 2005
- Operators: Department of Water Affairs and Forestry

Dam and spillways
- Type of dam: earth-fill, concrete
- Impounds: Luvuvhu River
- Height: 43 metres (141 ft)
- Length: 2,215 metres (7,267 ft)

Reservoir
- Creates: Nandoni Dam Reservoir
- Total capacity: 164,000,000 cubic metres (5.8×10^{9} cu ft)
- Catchment area: 1380 km^{2}
- Surface area: 1,570 hectares (3,900 acres)

Nandoni Dam (Nandoni meaning "the iron smelting ovens" in Venda language), previously known as the Mutoti Dam, is an earth-fill/concrete type dam in Limpopo province, South Africa. It is located on the Luvuvhu River near the villages of ha-Mutoti and ha-Budeli and ha-Mphego just a few kilometres from Thohoyandou in the district of Vhembe. The dam serves primarily for water supply and its hazard potential has been ranked high (3).

The Luvuvhu river follows a course along the southern edge of the Zoutpansberg and eventually joins the Limpopo River in the far northern corner of the Kruger National Park on the border between South Africa, Zimbabwe and Mozambique. Serious droughts during the early 1990s, when numerous boreholes in Venda and Gazankulu failed and consequently drinking water had to be delivered by tankers, led the Department of Water Affairs to investigate the feasibility of providing a steady water supply to the region.

The Nandoni Dam supplies water to several places in the region. Fishing in the dam attracts tourists, the main species being fished for are Largemouth bass and kurper.

The estimated cost of the Nandoni Dam was R373,3 million. Communities living in the basin of the dam were directly affected by the scheme. The inhabitants of Budeli, Mulenzhe, Tshiulongoma and Dididi have relocated to new houses built by the Department of Water Affairs and Forestry. The relocation applied to approximately 400 families.

Nandoni Dam consist of various places for fishing competitions, camping and lodging. The most popular fishing and lodging places are Nandoni Villa and Nandoni Fish Eagle.

== See also ==
- List of reservoirs and dams in South Africa
- List of rivers of South Africa
