= Vondo Dam =

- Interactive map of Vondo Dam
- Official name: Vondo Dam
- Location: Limpopo, South Africa
- Coordinates: 22°56′45″S 30°20′7″E
- Opening date: 1985 (renovated: 1994)
- Operators: Department of Water Affairs and Forestry

Dam and spillways
- Type of dam: earth-fill
- Impounds: Mutshindudi River
- Height: 43 metres (141 ft)
- Length: 294 metres (965 ft)

Reservoir
- Creates: Vondo Dam Reservoir
- Total capacity: 30,540,000 cubic metres (1.079×10^{9} cu ft)
- Catchment area: 51 km^{2}
- Surface area: 219 hectares (540 acres)

Vondo Dam is an earth-fill type dam located on the Mutshindudi River near Sibasa, Limpopo, South Africa. It was established in 1985 and has been renovated in 1994. The dam serves mainly for irrigation purposes and its hazard potential has been ranked high (3).

== See also ==
- List of reservoirs and dams in South Africa
- List of rivers of South Africa
