= Broederstroom River =

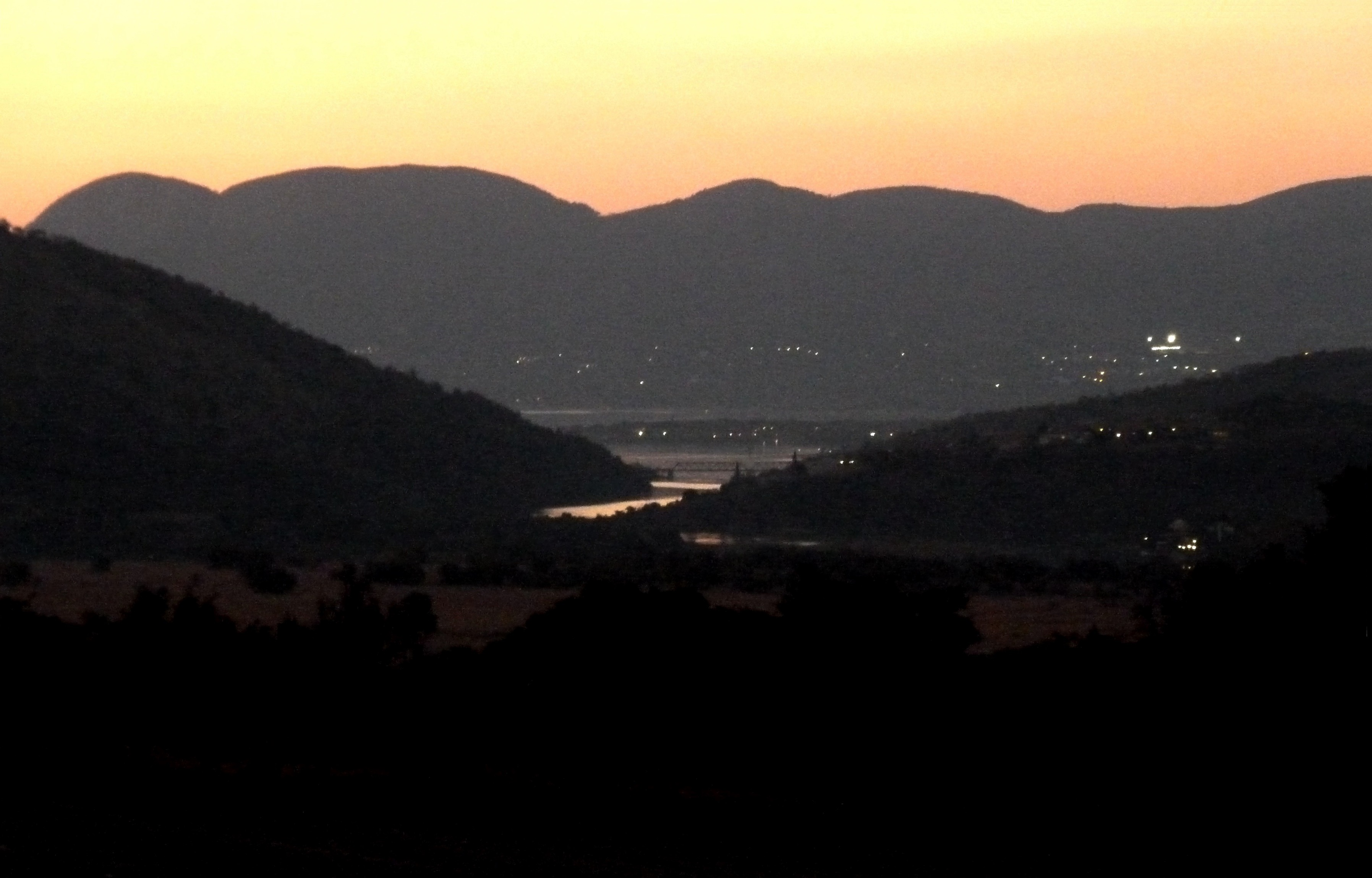

The Broederstroom River is a small stream located in the Woodbush Forest Reserve in Limpopo, South Africa. It is noted for its clear waters and recreational trout fishing, managed by the Haenertsburg Trout Association. Originating in montane forest, the river flows through areas increasingly affected by agricultural activity, resulting in runoff and erosion that impact water quality and aquatic biodiversity.
