= Gaborone =

Capital and largest city of Botswana

- Capital city
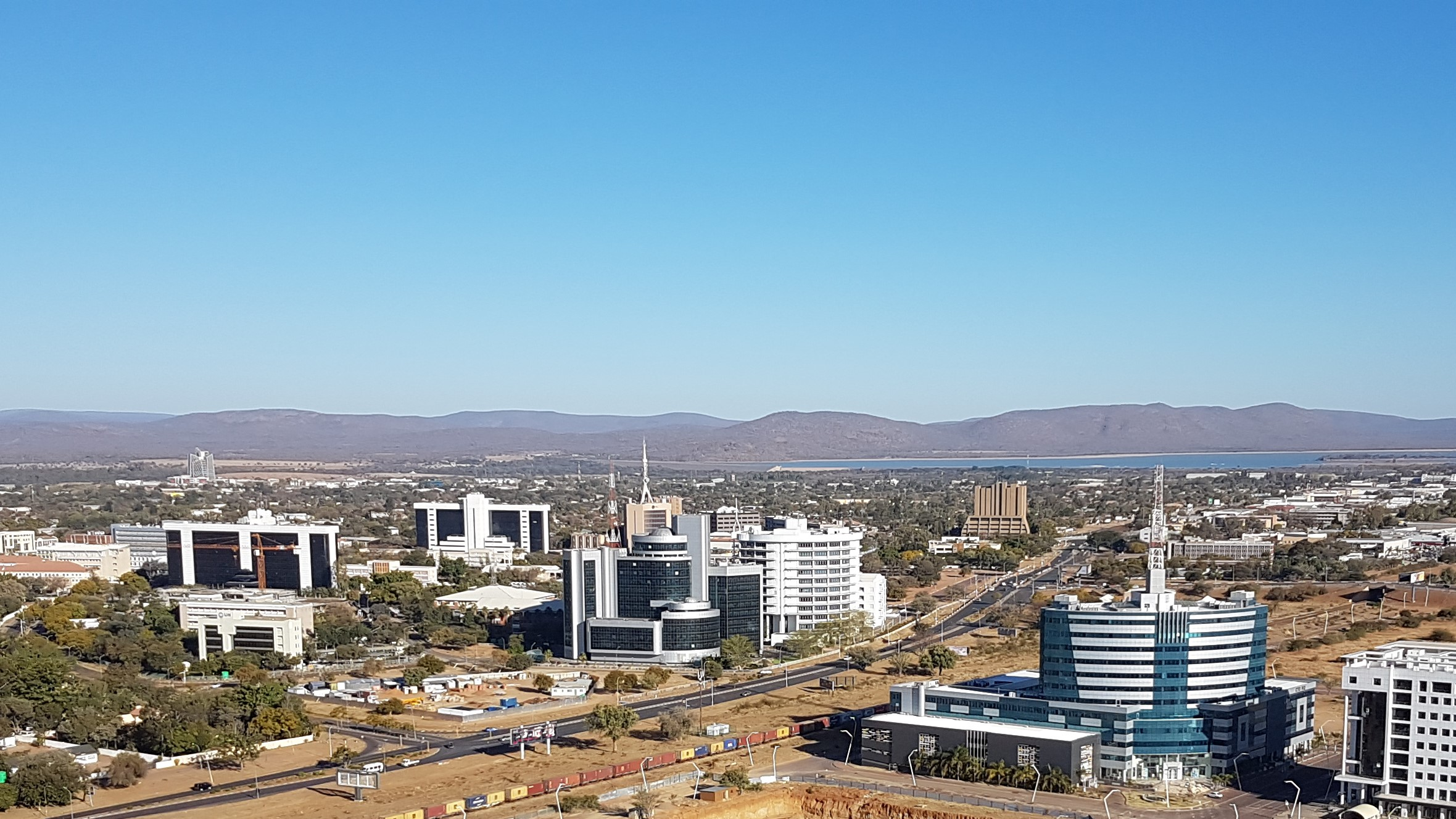
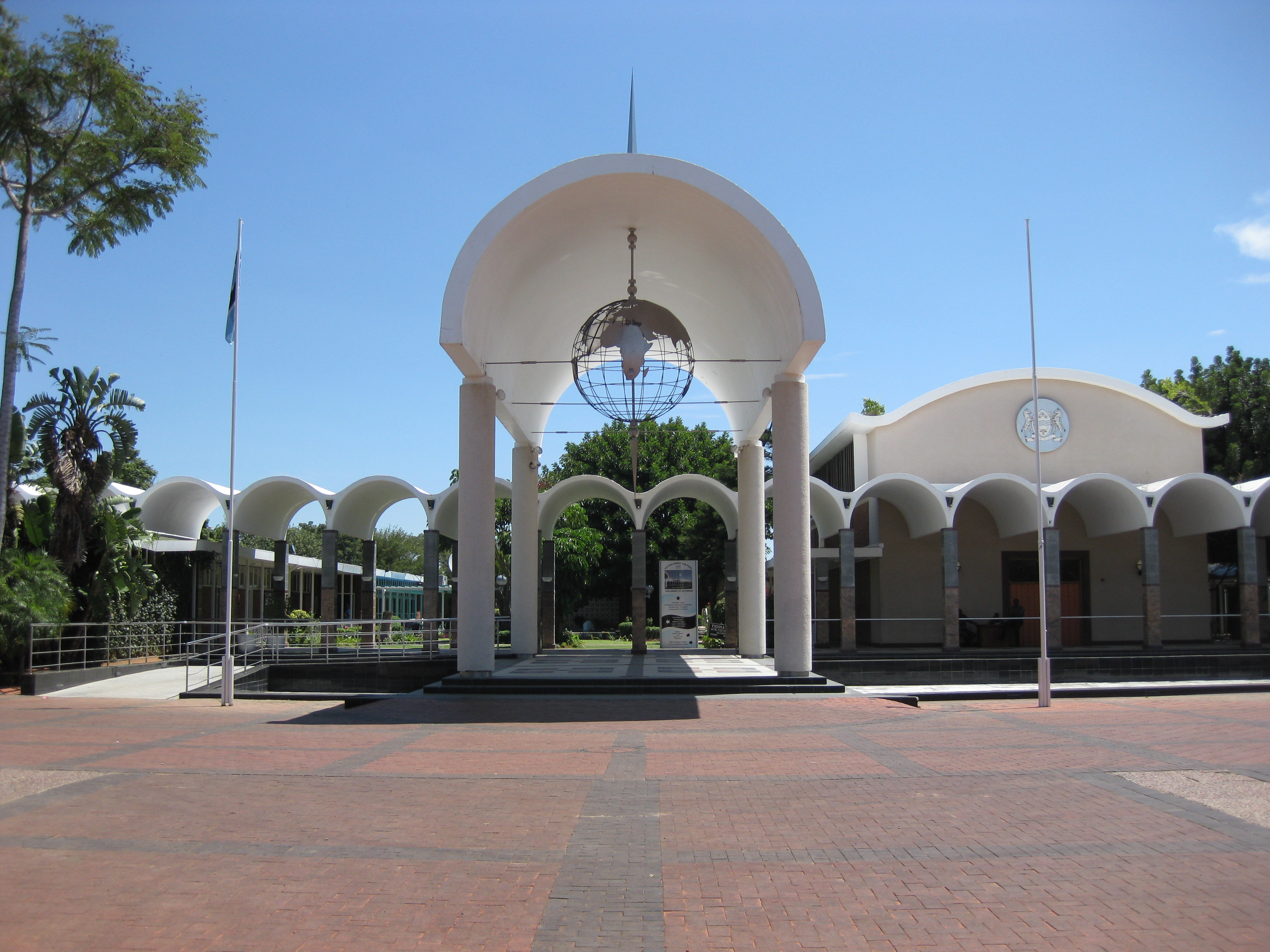
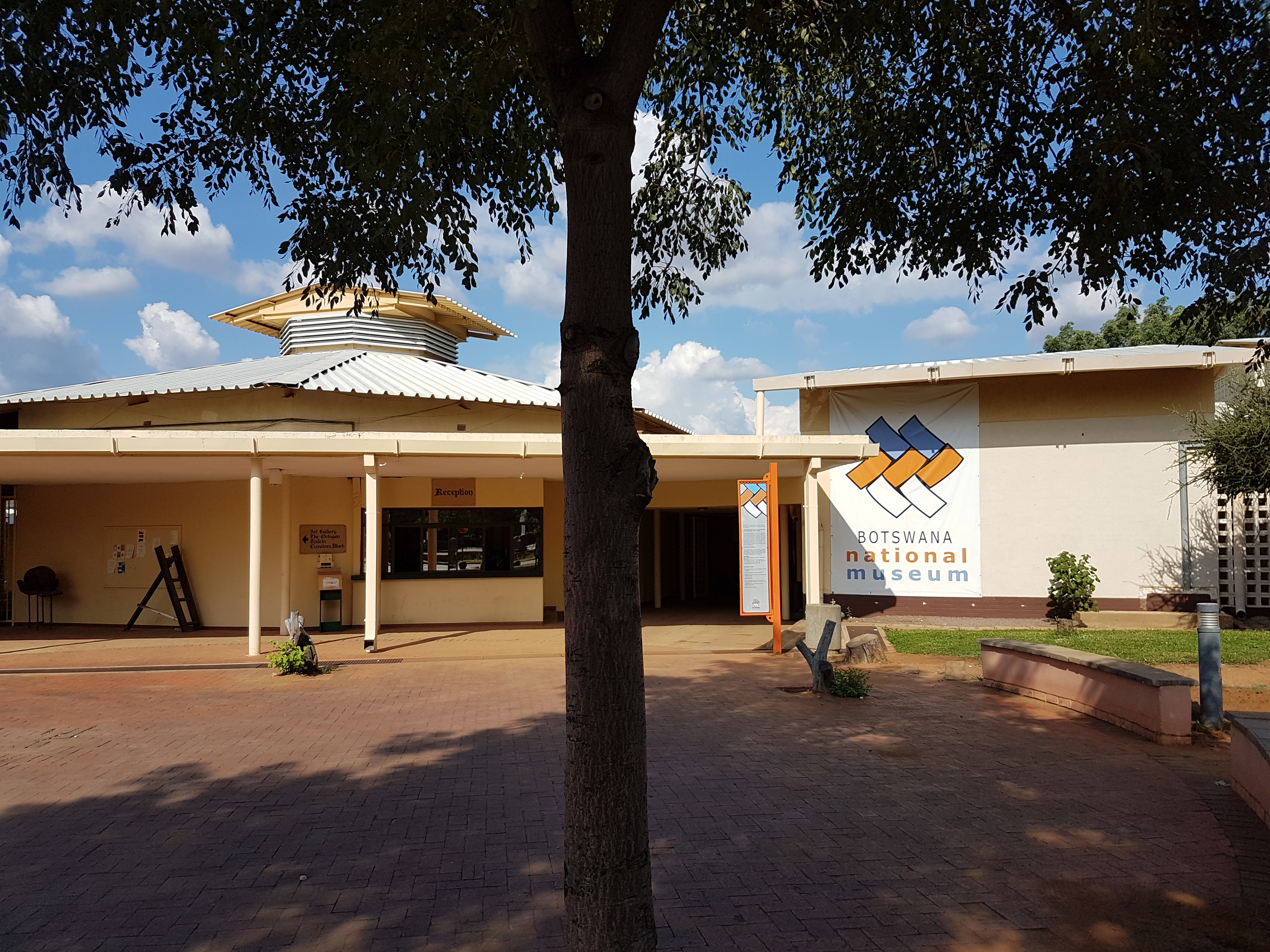
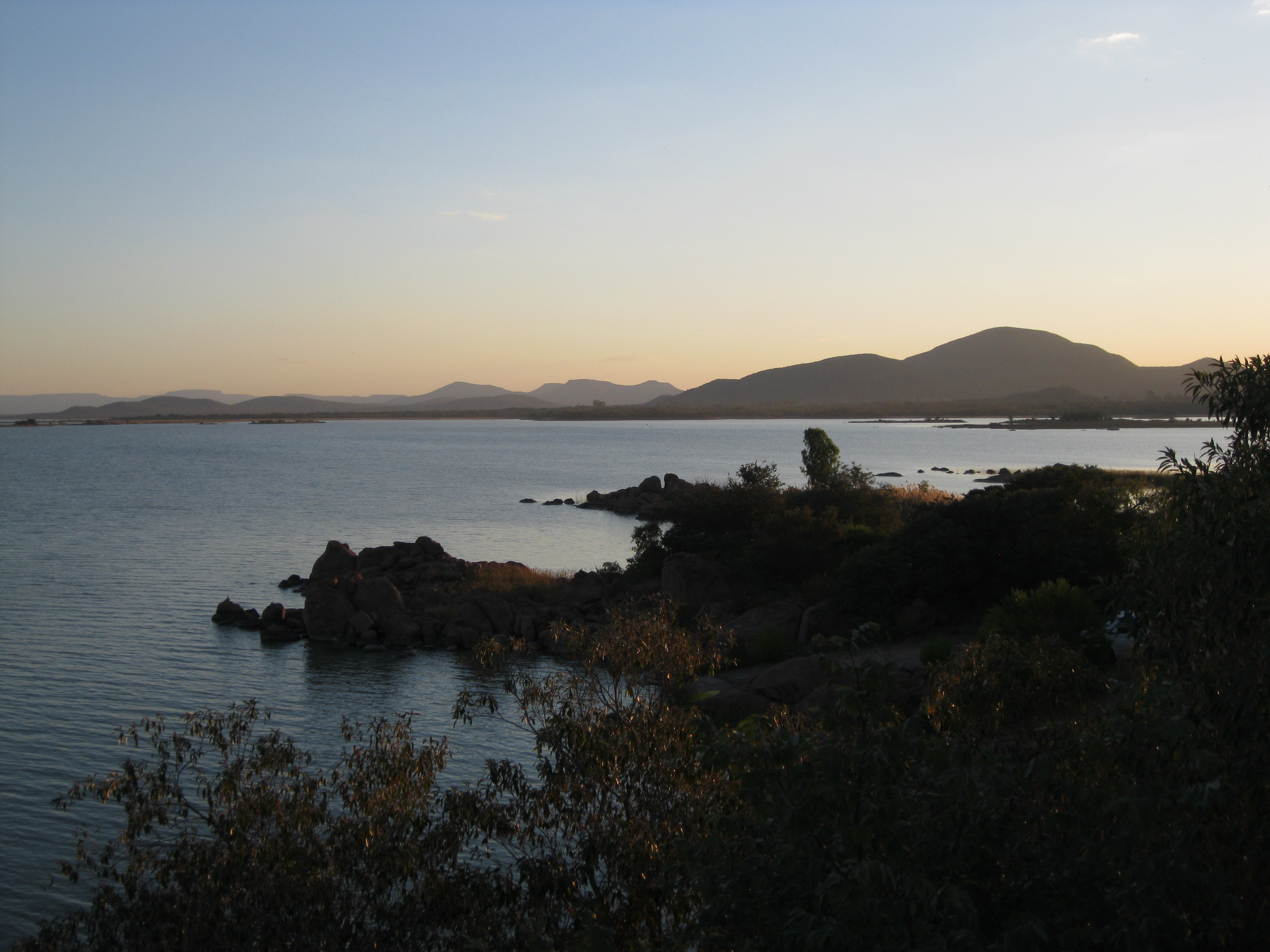
- Gaborone Central Business District (2020) Botswana Parliament Sir Seretse Khama International Airport Gaborone National Museum Gaborone Dam

- Flag
- Nicknames: Gabs, GC, Gabz, G-City, Mageba, Moshate
- Interactive map of Gaborone
- Location within Botswana Location within Africa
- Coordinates: 24°39′29″S 25°54′44″E
- Country: Botswana
- Founded: 1964
- Named for: Kgosi Gaborone

Government
  - Type: City commission government
  - Body: Gaborone City Council
  - Mayor: Oarabile Motlaleng (UDC)
  - Deputy Mayor: Mankie Sekete (UDC)

Area
  - Capital city: 169 km^{2} (65 sq mi)
- Elevation: 1,014 m (3,327 ft)

Population (2022)
  - Capital city: 246,325
  - Density: 1,460/km^{2} (3,780/sq mi)
  - Metro: 534,842
- Time zone: UTC+02:00 (CAT)
- Geographical area code: 3XX
- ISO 3166 code: BW-SE
- HDI (2019): 0.820 very high
- Climate: BSh
- Website: Gaborone City Council Website

Gaborone (UK: /ˌɡæbəˈroʊni, ˌhæb-/ GAB-ə-ROH-nee, HAB-, US: /ˌɡɑːbəˈroʊni, -neɪ/ GAH-bə-ROH-nee, -nay, Tswana: [χabʊˈrʊnɛ]) is the capital and largest city of Botswana. It was formerly spelled as Gaberones during the colonial era, a name occasionally used in older English texts and maps. With a population of 246,325 based on the 2022 census, about 10% of the total population of Botswana. Its metropolitan area is home to 534,842 inhabitants at the 2022 census.

Gaborone is situated between Kgale Hill and Oodi Hill, near the confluence of the Notwane River and Segoditshane River in the southeastern corner of Botswana, within 15 kilometres (9.3 mi) from the South African border. The city is served by the Sir Seretse Khama International Airport. It is an administrative district in its own right, but is the capital of the surrounding South-East District. Locals often refer to the city as GC or Motse-Mshate.

The city of Gaborone is named after Chief Gaborone of the Tlokwa people, who once controlled land nearby. Because it was not affiliated with any specific indigenous group and was close to fresh water, the city was planned to be the capital in the mid-1960s when the Bechuanaland Protectorate became an independent nation. The centre of the city comprises a long strip of commercial businesses, called "Main Mall", with a semi-circular area of government offices to its east. Gaborone was once one of the fastest-growing cities in the world, and this has created problems with housing and illegal settlements. The city also dealt with conflicts spilling into the country from Zimbabwe and South Africa during the 1980s.

Gaborone is the political and economic capital of Botswana, home to its largest companies and the Botswana Stock Exchange. It also serves as the headquarters of the Southern African Development Community (SADC). The main spoken languages in the city include Setswana (Tswana), English, Kalanga, and Kgalagadi.

== History ==
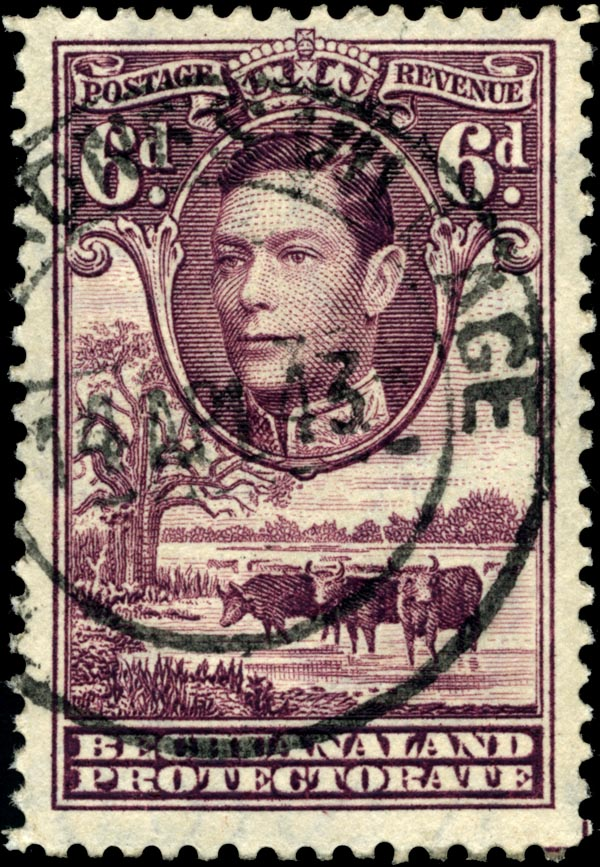
A postage stamp circa 1943, the postmark reading "Gaborone's Village"

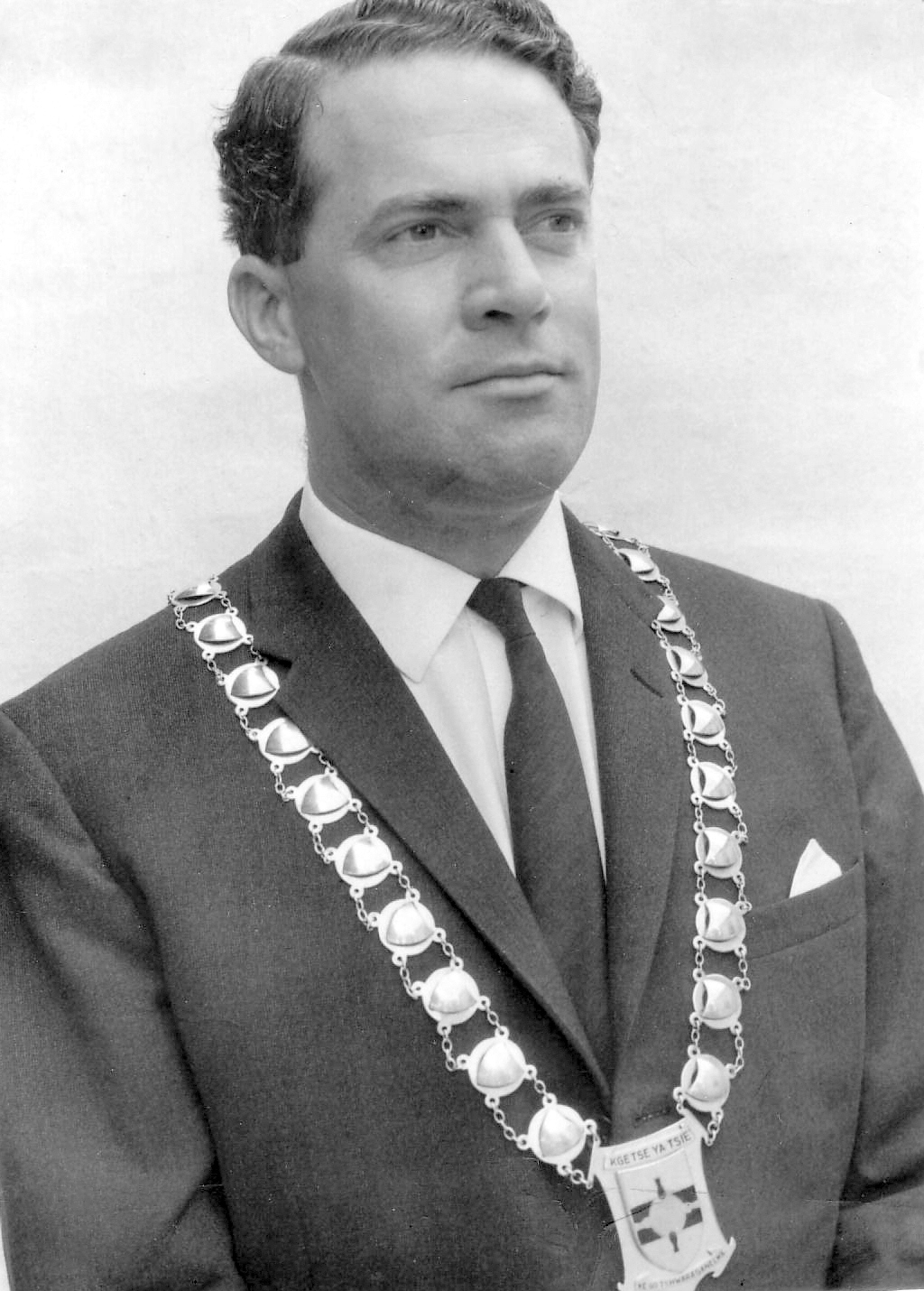
Rev. Derek Jones, the first mayor of Gaborone

Evidence shows that there have been inhabitants along the Notwane River for centuries. In more recent history, the Tlokwa left the Magaliesberg ranges to settle in the area around 1880, and called the settlement Moshaweng. The word "Gaborone" literally means "it does not fit badly" or "it is not unbecoming". The city was then called "Gaberones" by early European colonizers. Gaberones, a shortening of "Gaborone's Village", was named after Chief Gaborone of the Tlokwa, whose home village (now called Tlokweng) was across the river from the Government Camp, the name of the colonial government headquarters. The nickname, "GC", comes from the name "Government Camp". In 1890, Cecil John Rhodes picked Gaberones to house a colonial fort. The fort was where Rhodes planned the Jameson Raid. The city changed its name from Gaberones to Gaborone in 1969.

The modern town was only founded in 1964, after a decision was taken to establish a capital for Botswana, which became a self governing territory in 1965, before becoming a fully independent republic on 30 September 1966.

In 1965, the capital of the Bechuanaland Protectorate moved from Mafeking to Gaberones. When Botswana gained its independence, Lobatse was the first choice as the nation's capital. However, Lobatse was deemed too limited, and instead, a new capital city would be created next to Gaberones. The city was chosen because of its proximity to a fresh water source, its proximity to the railway to Pretoria, its central location among the central tribes, and its lack of association with those surrounding tribes.

The city was planned under Garden city principles with numerous pedestrian walkways and open spaces. Building of Gaborone started in mid-1964. During the city's construction, the chairman of Gaberones Township Authority, Geoffrey Cornish, likened the layout of the city to a "brandy glass" with the government offices in the base of the glass and businesses in the "mall", a strip of land extending from the base.

Most of the early town was built within three years, as a small town designed to accommodate 20,000 people – only to later develop after independence into a modern city. Buildings in early Gaborone include assembly buildings, government offices, a power station, a hospital, schools, a radio station, a telephone exchange, police stations, a post office, and more than 1,000 houses. Because the town was built so quickly, there was a massive influx of labourers who had built illegal settlements on the new city's southern industrial development zone. These settlements were named Naledi. The latter term literally means "the star", but could also mean "under the open sky" or "a community that stands out from all others". In 1971, because of the growth of illegal settlements, the Gaborone Town Council and the Ministry of Local Government and Lands surveyed an area called Bontleng, which would contain low-income housing. However, Naledi still grew, and the demand for housing was greater than ever. In 1973, the Botswana Housing Corporation (BHC) built a "New Naledi" across the road from the "Old Naledi". Residents from Old Naledi would be moved to New Naledi. However, the demand for housing increased yet again; moreover, the residents who relocated to New Naledi disliked the houses. The problem was solved in 1975 when Sir Seretse Khama, the president of Botswana, rezoned Naledi from an industrial zone to a low-income housing area.

On 30 September 1966, Bechuanaland became the eleventh British dependency in Africa to become independent. The first mayor of Gaborone was Reverend Derek Jones. The old Gaberones became a suburb of the new Gaborone, and is now known as "the Village".

In the mid-1980s, South Africa attacked Botswana and conducted raids on Gaborone and other border towns. The Raid on Gaborone resulted in twelve deaths.

After the 1994 General Elections, riots started in Gaborone because of high unemployment and other issues.

Today, Gaborone is growing very rapidly. In 1964, Gaborone only had 3,855 citizens; seven years later, the city had almost 18,000 residents. The city originally planned on 20,000 citizens, but by 1992, the city had 138,000 people. This has led to many squatter settlements on undeveloped land. Former mayor Veronica Lesole has stated that Gaborone's development problems were caused by the original city planners.

== Geography ==
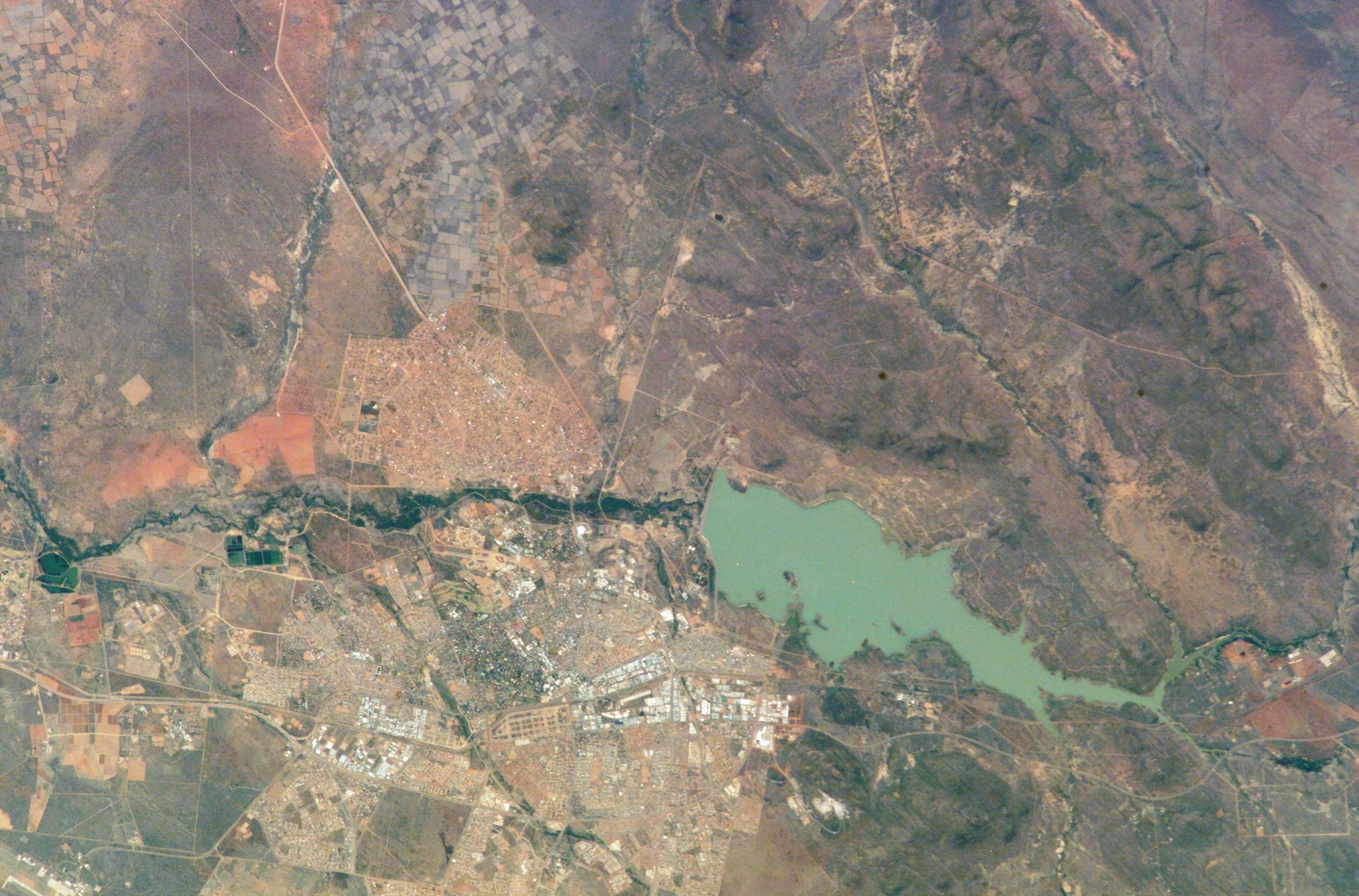
Satellite view of Gaborone. North is to the left of the image.

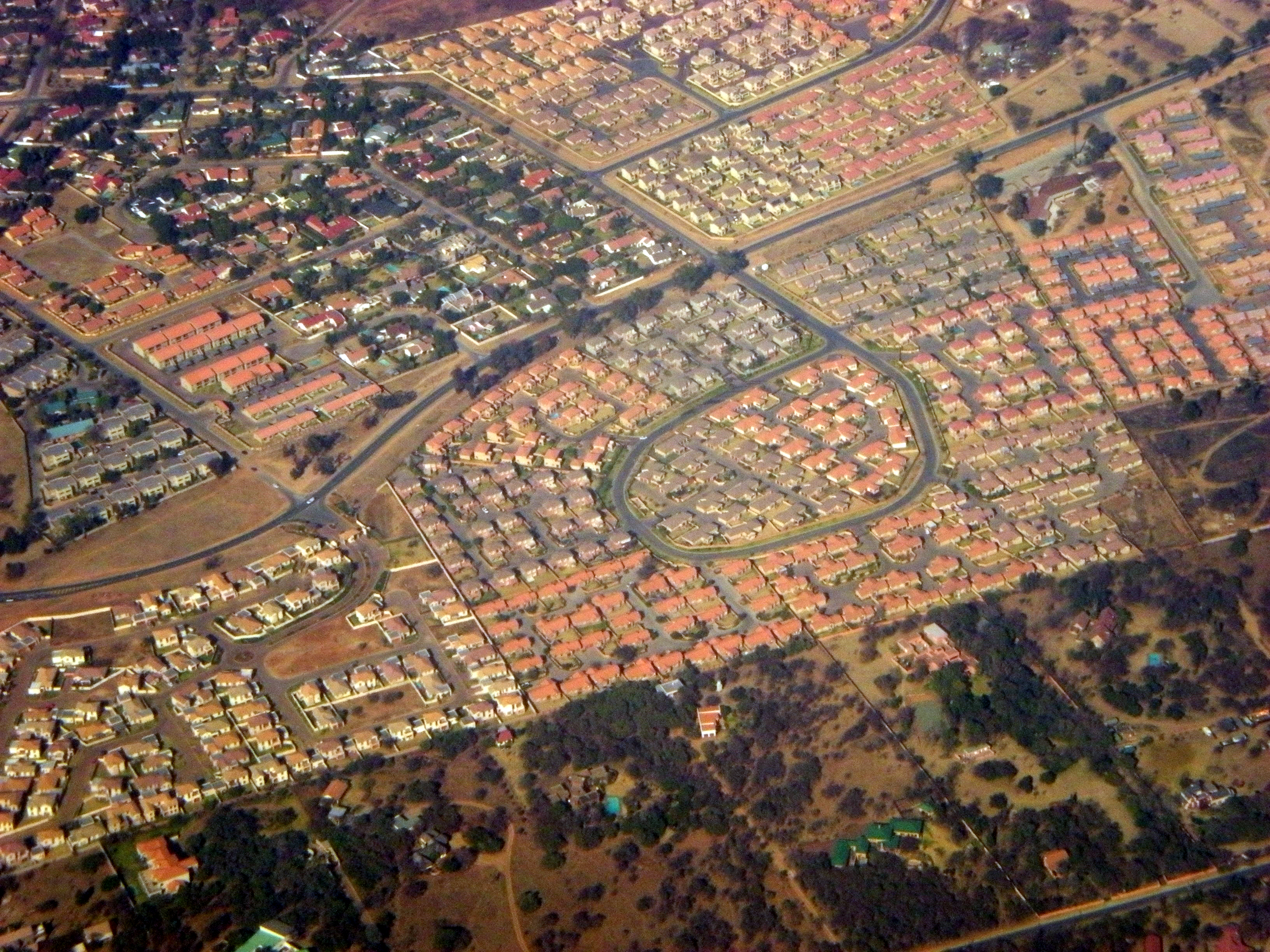
Gaborone aerial

Gaborone is situated at 24°39′29″S 25°54′44″E between Kgale and Oodi Hills, on the Notwane River in the south-eastern corner of Botswana, and 15 kilometres (9.3 mi) from the South African border. The city lies at an elevation of 1,010 metres (3,310 ft) above sea level. Gaborone is surrounded by the following cities: Ramotswa to the southwest, Mogoditshane to the northwest, and Mochudi to the east, and Tlokweng across the river. Most of them are commuter towns for Gaborone. Suburbs in Gaborone include Broadhurst, Gaborone West, The Village, Naledi. Phakalane, an affluent suburb, lies about 13 km north of the city center.

In the centre of the city lies the Main Mall which houses many diplomatic missions. At the eastern end of the Mall, one can find the Civic Centre along with the Pula Arch that commemorates Botswana's independence. The Botswana Stock Exchange, National Museum and Art Gallery, and the main campus of the University of Botswana also lie near the Main Mall. To the west of the Main Mall is the Government Enclave. This area contains the governmental buildings such as the National Assembly of Botswana and Ntlo ya Dikgosi buildings. The National Archives building is also found here.

=== Climate ===
Gaborone has a hot semi-arid climate (Köppen climate classification BSh). Most of the year, Gaborone is very sunny. The summers are usually hot. The nights are cool. Usually, the summers with little rainfall are warmer than summers with regular rainfall. If there is a drought, the hottest temperatures of the year are usually in January or February. If there is normal rainfall, the hottest temperatures are usually in October, right before the rain starts. During the winter, days are still warm, and the nights are cold.

There are on average seventy-four days per year with temperatures above 32 °C (90 °F). There are on average 196 days per year with temperatures above 26 °C (79 °F). There are on average fifty-one days per year with temperatures below 7 °C (45 °F). There is on average one day per year with temperatures below 0 °C (32 °F). The average dew point peaks around January and February at 16 °C (61 °F) and hits the lowest levels in July at 2 °C (36 °F). The average dew point in a given year is 10 °C (50 °F). The record high temperature ever registered in Gaborone was 43.9 °C (111.0 °F). The lowest temperature registered in Gaborone was −6.5 °C (20.3 °F).

Precipitation in Gaborone is scanty and erratic. Most of the rainfall in Gaborone falls during the summer months, between October and April. There are on average forty days of thunderstorms per year, most of them happening during the summer months, and four days of fog, usually happening during the winter months. Gaborone has been affected by three floods based on records going back to 1995, one in 2000, one in 2001 that caused an estimated 5,000,000 Botswana pula worth of damage, and one in 2006. On average the city receives 3328.4 sunshine hours a year. The highest temperature ever record in the city was measured at 43.3 °C (109.9 °F) on January 6, 1995, and the lowest of −5.8 °C (21.6 °F) on June 14, 1971.

The highest relative humidity occurs in June at 90% while the lowest is in September at 28%.

Solar irradiance ranges from 4.1 kWh m^{−2} d^{−1} in June to 7.3 kWh m^{−2} d^{−1} in December.

It is windier from September to November at 14 km/h (8.7 mph), and it is calmer from May to August at 8 km/h (5.0 mph). The average wind speed in a given year is 12 km/h (7.5 mph).

Climate data for Gaborone (Sir Seretse Khama International Airport) 1991–2020 normals, extremes 1950–present
Month	Jan	Feb	Mar	Apr	May	Jun	Jul	Aug	Sep	Oct	Nov	Dec	Year
Record high °C (°F)	41.7 (107.1)	41.0 (105.8)	39.5 (103.1)	36.7 (98.1)	33.4 (92.1)	29.5 (85.1)	28.5 (83.3)	33.5 (92.3)	38.9 (102.0)	41.5 (106.7)	42.0 (107.6)	43.3 (109.9)	43.3 (109.9)
Mean daily maximum °C (°F)	32.6 (90.7)	31.9 (89.4)	30.5 (86.9)	28.0 (82.4)	25.3 (77.5)	22.4 (72.3)	22.5 (72.5)	25.9 (78.6)	30.1 (86.2)	32.2 (90.0)	32.4 (90.3)	32.5 (90.5)	28.9 (84.0)
Daily mean °C (°F)	26.3 (79.3)	25.7 (78.3)	24.1 (75.4)	20.8 (69.4)	16.9 (62.4)	13.7 (56.7)	13.4 (56.1)	16.8 (62.2)	21.2 (70.2)	24.5 (76.1)	25.1 (77.2)	25.9 (78.6)	21.2 (70.2)
Mean daily minimum °C (°F)	19.9 (67.8)	19.4 (66.9)	17.8 (64.0)	13.5 (56.3)	8.4 (47.1)	5.0 (41.0)	4.3 (39.7)	7.7 (45.9)	12.3 (54.1)	16.8 (62.2)	17.8 (64.0)	19.3 (66.7)	13.5 (56.3)
Record low °C (°F)	12.4 (54.3)	11.0 (51.8)	5.5 (41.9)	−0.5 (31.1)	−4.0 (24.8)	−5.8 (21.6)	−5.0 (23.0)	−3.5 (25.7)	1.0 (33.8)	6.0 (42.8)	7.5 (45.5)	9.4 (48.9)	−5.8 (21.6)
Average precipitation mm (inches)	94.2 (3.71)	82.5 (3.25)	64.3 (2.53)	26.1 (1.03)	8.4 (0.33)	4.2 (0.17)	0.5 (0.02)	2.1 (0.08)	11.4 (0.45)	41.3 (1.63)	67.8 (2.67)	85.6 (3.37)	488.4 (19.24)
Average rainy days	9.2	7.8	6.5	3.4	1.2	0.8	0.2	0.5	1.3	4.2	6.9	8.4	50.4
Mean monthly sunshine hours	280.8	244.3	279.0	281.1	312.4	300.0	315.6	320.3	316.5	305.8	275.6	277.6	3,409
Percentage possible sunshine	67	67	73	81	92	94	94	91	88	77	69	66	77
Source 1:
Source 2: Weatherbase (records)

== Demographics ==
Historical population
Year	Pop.	±% p.a.
1964	3,855	—
1971	17,718	+24.34%
1981	59,657	+12.91%
1991	133,468	+8.39%
2001	186,007	+3.37%
2006	191,776	+0.61%
2011	231,626	+3.85%
2022	246,325	+0.56%

The population, based on the 2022 census, is 246,325. There are 118,727 males and 127,598 females in the city. There are 58,476 households in Gaborone. In 2001, the average household size was 3.11 people. The city of Gaborone is home to over 10% of the population of Botswana. Almost half of Botswana citizens live within 100 kilometres (62 mi) of Gaborone.

The population growth rate of Gaborone is 3.4%, the highest in the country. This is most likely because the city has a more developed infrastructure, making it more livable. Gaborone is one of the fastest-growing cities in the world. Much of the growth is based on net in migration from the rest of Botswana.

The sex ratio of Gaborone is 96.3, meaning that there are 963 men for every 1,000 women. About 15% of all marriages in Botswana were registered in Gaborone in 2007; this is more than any other district. On average, there are 3.3 persons per household in Gaborone. This is a low number compared to the rest of Botswana.

== Places of worship ==
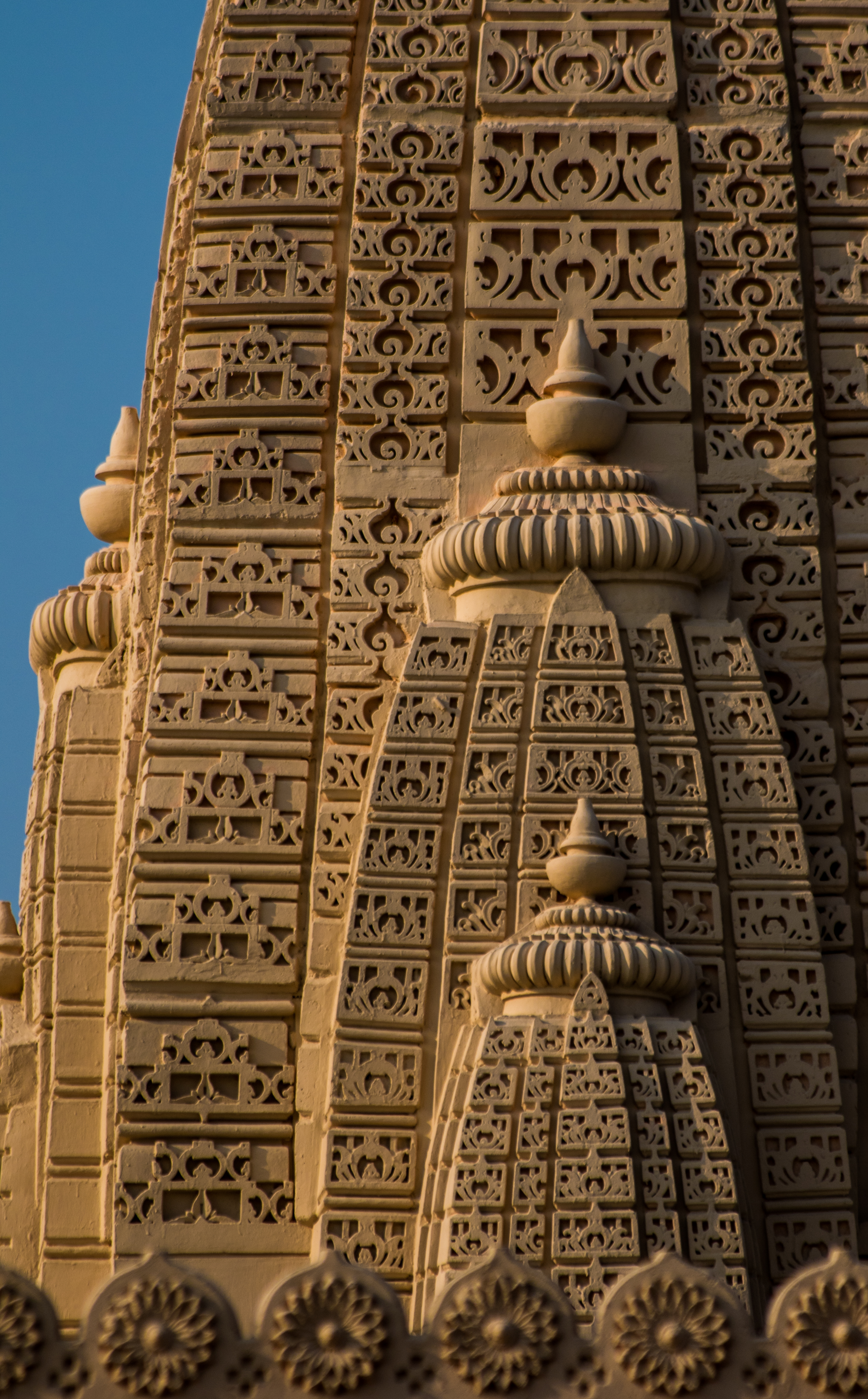
Gaborone Hindu temple

Among places of worship, Christian churches and temples predominate. These include houses of worship affiliated with the Church of the Province of Central Africa (Anglican), the Evangelical Lutheran Church in Botswana (Lutheran World Federation), Assemblies of God, The Church of Jesus Christ of Latter-day Saints, International Pentecostal Holiness Church, Christ Embassy, and the Roman Catholic Diocese of Gaborone (Catholic Church). The city is also home to Serbian Orthodox churches, including St. Nicholas Orthodox Cathedral and St. Sava Serbian Orthodox Church.

== Culture ==
The National Museum and Art Gallery is located just northwest of the Mall along Independence Road. The museum opened in 1968. It holds many things from traditional crafts to works of art by local artists. The museum houses original paintings by Thomas Baines and Lucas Sithole. Exhibits include Artists in Botswana, Children's Art Competition and Thapong International. Outside the museum, there are various forms of transportation such as wagons, sledges, and bakkies (pickup trucks). There is also an exhibit on the San, the earliest inhabitants of southern Africa. The museum opened a 3.6-hectare (9-acre) botanical garden called the National Botanical Garden on 2 November 2007. The garden was built to protect Botswana's indigenous plant life, and 90% of its total plant species are native plants from Botswana.

The Maitisong Festival was started in 1987 and is held every year for seven days on either the last week of March or the first week of April. The festival holds outdoor concerts, plays, and films in various venues around the city.

"My African Dream" was a performing-arts competition during the 2000s that was held every year at the Gaborone International Convention Center. The show featured many kwaito dancers and musicians.

The book series The No. 1 Ladies' Detective Agency, written by Scottish author Alexander McCall Smith, is set in Gaborone. The books follow Precious Ramotswe, the first female private detective in Botswana, and the mysteries that she solves. The Detective Kubu series, by Michael Stanley (South African co-writers Michael Sears and Stanley Trollip), features Assistant Superintendent David 'Kubu' Bengu of the Botswana Police Service Criminal Investigation Department.

== Economy ==
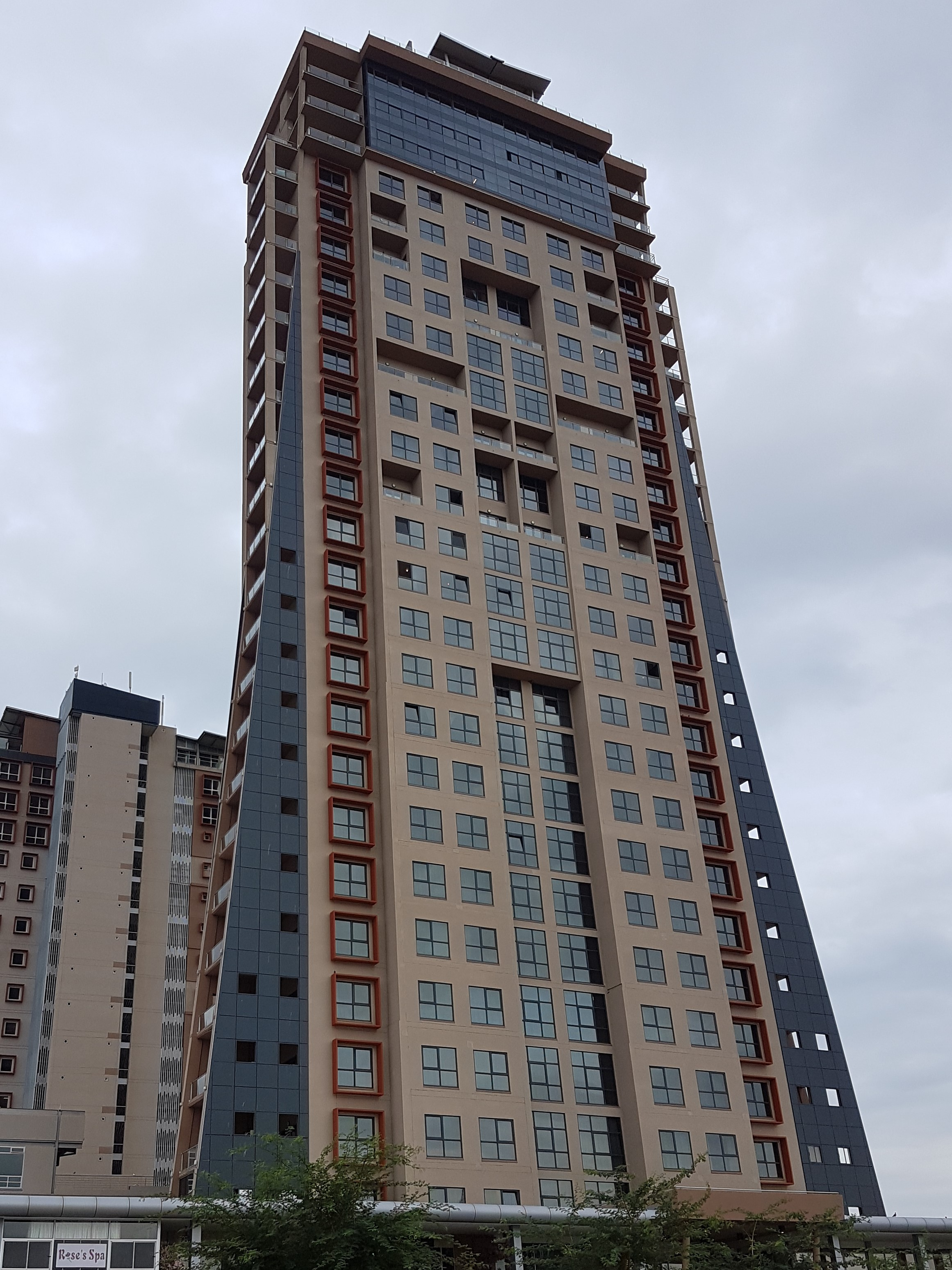
I-Tower at Central Business District

Gaborone is the center of the national economy. The headquarters of important financial institutions such as the Bank of Botswana, Bank Gaborone, BancABC, and the Botswana Stock Exchange are centrally located, as well as the headquarters for Air Botswana, Consumer Watchdog, Botswana Telecommunications Corporation, and Debswana, the joint diamond mining venture between De Beers and the Botswana government. The Southern African Development Community (SADC) has its headquarters in Gaborone; the organization was formed in 1980 to increase economic cooperation among its members and reduce dependence on South Africa.

Several international companies have invested in the city: Hyundai, SABMiller, Daewoo, Volvo, and Siemens.

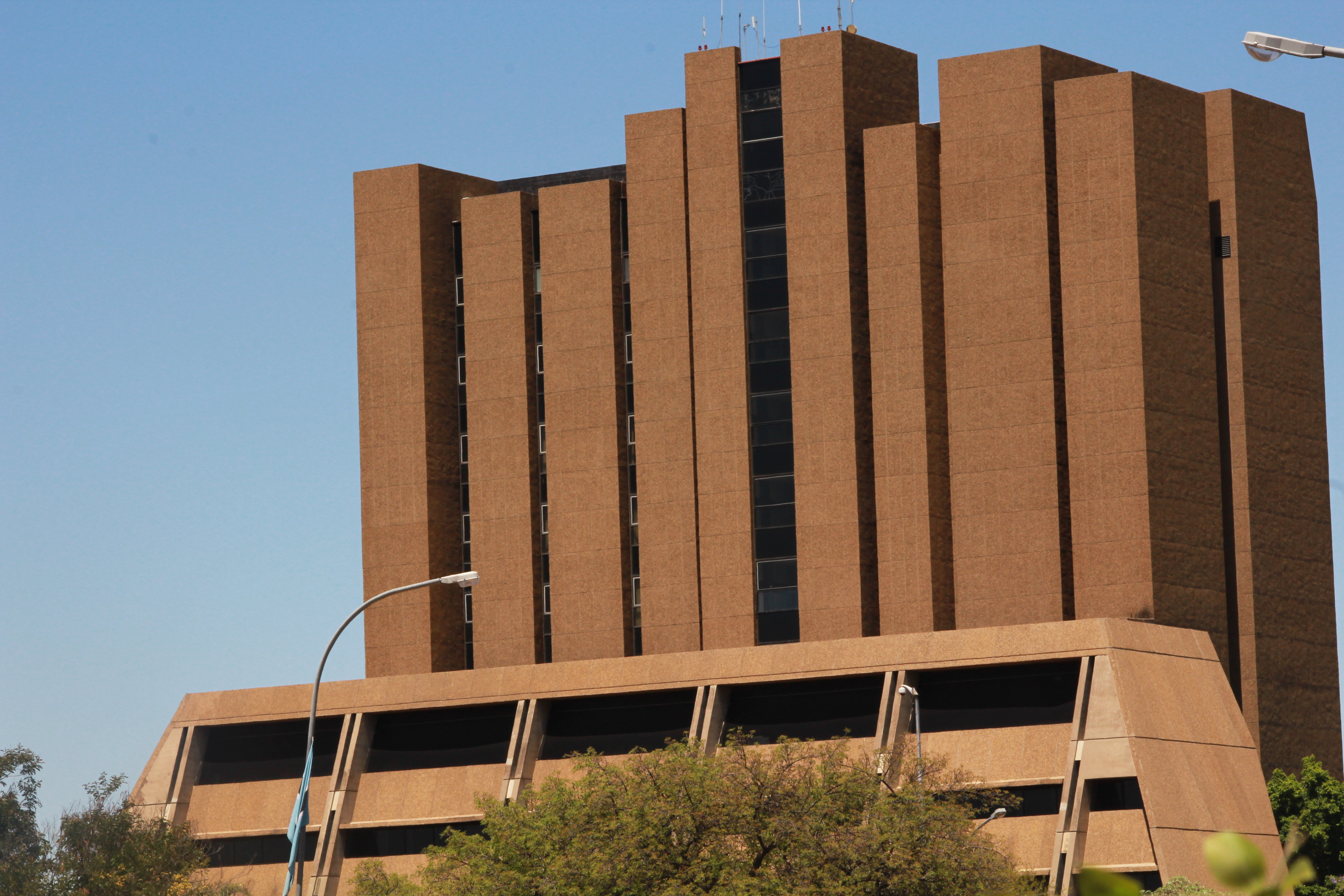
Orapa House

Orapa House, owned by Debswana, is where the diamonds mined from Debswana are sorted and valued. Orapa House is located at the intersection of Khama Crescent and Nelson Mandela Drive. It has a unique style of architecture that allows the optimal amount of indirect sunlight to shine through the windows in order to accurately sort diamonds.

Universal Plaza building in Gaborone CBD

A Diamond Technology Park was recently opened, this is as part of Botswana Government's vision for establishment of downstream diamond industry. Companies dealing in diamonds have established their local operations in the park.

The Botswana Resource Conference is held annually at the Gaborone International Conference Centre.

The unemployment rate in Gaborone is 11.7% as of 2008. 19.7% of the population in Gaborone is employed in the financial sector.

According to Mercer's 2011 Worldwide Cost of Living Survey, Gaborone has the 195th highest cost of living for expatriates in the world, up from 203rd in 2010. Gaborone comes between Chennai, India and Quito, Ecuador. Gaborone is the fourth least expensive city for expatriates in Africa, coming in above Addis Ababa, Ethiopia at 211th, Kampala, Uganda at 202nd and Windhoek, Namibia at 198th.

== Sport ==
There are several football stadiums located in and around Gaborone. These include SSKB Stadium, Mochudi Stadium, and Botswana National Stadium. There are also several football teams representing Gaborone, which include, amongst others, Botswana Defence Force XI, Gaborone United, Police XI, Township Rollers and Uniao Flamengo Santos FC, which is based in nearby Gabane; all of them have played in the Botswana Premier League. The Botswana national football team plays in the National Stadium, but has never qualified for the FIFA World Cup, even though they recently qualified for the Africa Cup of Nations, held in Gabon in January 2012.

The Botswana Cricket Association, the governing body of cricket in Botswana, is headquartered in Gaborone. There are two Ovals where cricket is played in the city.

The Steinmetz Gaborone Marathon, the second marathon in Botswana, was held for the first time on 18 April 2010. The route started at the Phakalane Golf Estate in Phakalane, north of the city, and went through Gaborone, passing the National Assembly Building. The marathon, which was cancelled in 2011, has been held annually starting from 2012.

Stadiums in Gaborone
Botswana Cricket Association Oval	Cricket	n/a	Botswana cricket team
Botswana National Stadium	Football, athletics, rugby, tennis	25,000	Gaborone United, Notwane F.C., Police XI, Township Rollers F.C.
Mochudi Stadium	Football	10,000	Mochudi Centre Chiefs
SSKB Stadium	Football	5,000	Botswana Defence Force XI
University of Botswana Stadium	Football	5,000	Uniao Flamengo Santos F.C.

== Parks, recreation and wildlife ==
The Gaborone Dam is located south of Gaborone along the Gaborone-Lobatse road, and provides water for both Gaborone and Lobatse. The dam is the second biggest in Botswana, able to hold 141,400,000 cubic metres (184,900,000 cu yd). It is also starting to be marketed as a recreational area. The northern end of the reservoir is planned to become an entertainment venue called The Waterfront. There is a yacht club, called Gaborone Yacht Club, also on the northern side of the lake. The southern end houses the Kalahari Fishing Club and a new public facility called City Scapes. City Scapes contains parks, playgrounds, and boating facilities. The dam is popular with birdwatchers, windsurfers, and anglers. However, there is no swimming due to the presence of crocodiles and parasitic bilharzias.

=== Gaborone Game Reserve ===
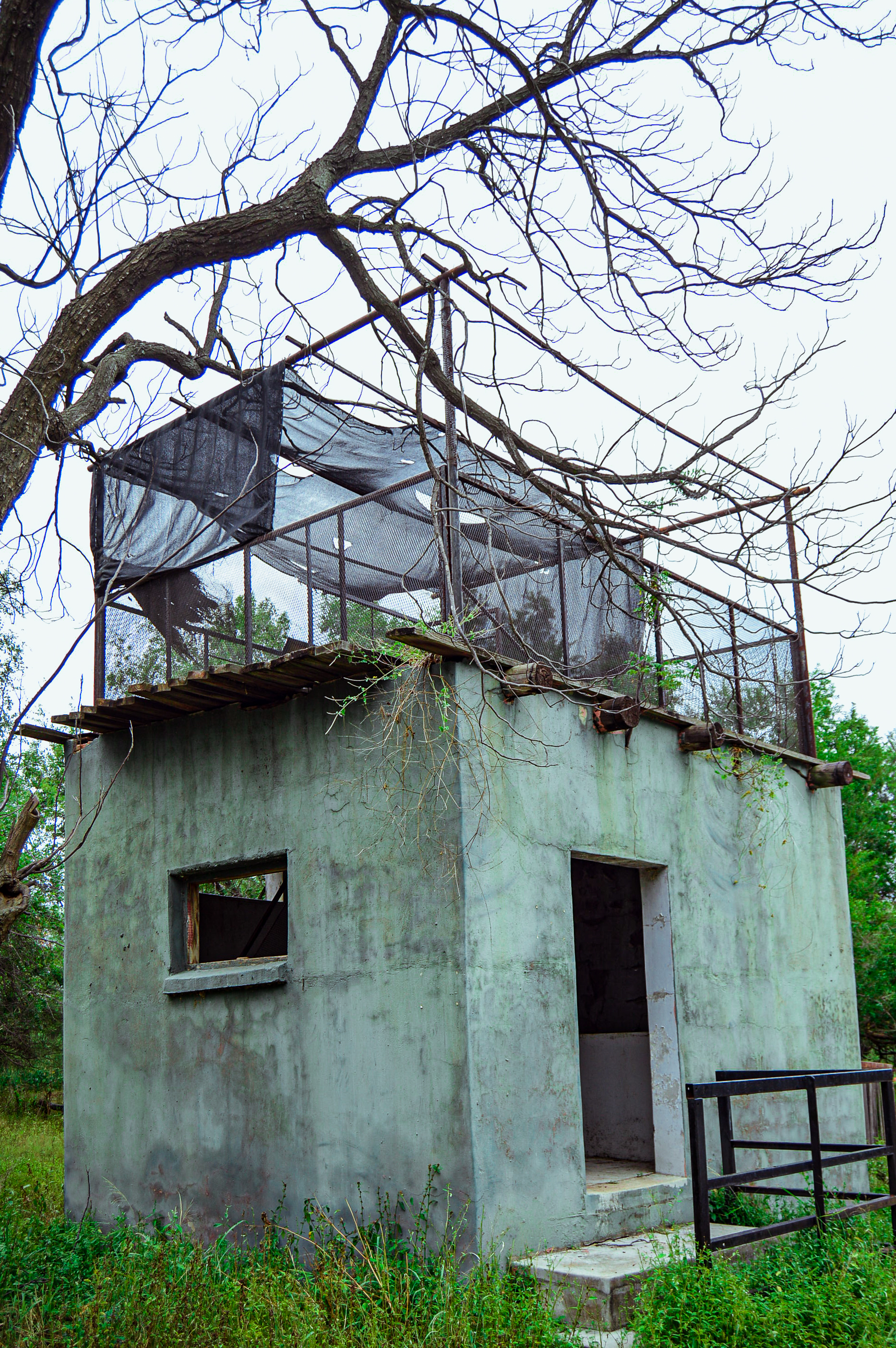
Watch house in Gaborone Game Reserve

The Gaborone Game Reserve is a 600-hectare (1,500-acre) park east of the city on Limpopo Drive. The reserve was built in 1988 and is now the third-busiest in Botswana.

==== Activities ====
The reserve roads has dirt roads which run through it to interlink a range of activities such as game drives and picnics. The reserve is for day visitors as there is no accommodation or camping areas within for overnight visitors. However, guest houses and lodges are just 1 km away from the reserve. Guided drives are not provided and one can drive through the reserve on their own pace.

==== Flora ====
The reserve borders the Notwane River as a fence separates the two. There is 1 permanent waterhole throughout the year which is visited by numerous species of waterbirds and migrants. Throughout the rainy season, temporary lakes and ponds form but they dry up when the season ends. The reserve is mostly scrubland, savannah and semi-arid grass. Vachellia karoo, Umbrella thorn, Mopane, Phoenix reclinata, Peruvian zinnia and Cereus jamacaru along with 50 other species of tree can be found here. Verbesina enceliodes explode all over the area during the hot summer months which attract species of pollinators from throughout.

==== Fauna ====
The reserve is home to numerous species of ungulates, reptiles and birds. It is home to only one species of primate, the Vervet monkey. Ungulates commonly found here are Impala, Greater kudu, Common warthog and the national animal, Burchell's zebra. Common eland and Cape porcupine are rarely seen. Rock hyrax and Smith's bush squirrel is ever present by the large boulders that span over the reserve and reptiles that call the reserve home include Marsh terrapin and Nile monitor. Numerous species of birds such as Cape turtle doves, Southern ostrich, Laughing doves, Helmeted guinea fowl, Cape starling, Red-billed oxpecker, Crested barbet, Acacia pied barbet, Green-winged pytilia, Southern cordonbleu, fork-tailed drongo, pied crow, and crowned lapwings are seen in the scrub/scrublands whereas birds such as Southern yellow-billed hornbill, Southern red-billed hornbill, Hamerkop, Goliath heron, black-headed heron, brown-hooded kingfisher, Southern pied babbler, African darter, wood sandpiper, lesser moorhen, green wood hoopoe and crimson-breasted shrike are uncommon. Birds such as black-winged stilt, African jacana, blacksmith lapwing, three-banded plover, red-billed teal, Hadada ibis, African sacred ibis, glossy ibis, black crake, common moorhen, fulvous whistling duck, white-faced whistling duck, great egret , yellow-billed egret, little egret, Western cattle egret , grey heron and Egyptian goose can be found along the waterholes along with the African fish eagle which is more often heard then seen. Fish such as African catfish are abundant in the waterbodies after the rainy season. Over 50 species of butterfly and moth like African migrant call the reserve home with the Citrus swallowtail and Plain tiger being commonly seen.

==== Flamingos ====
Around 37 Greater flamingos were recorded for the first time in the region at the main waterhole in March 2024.

===== Other places of recreation =====
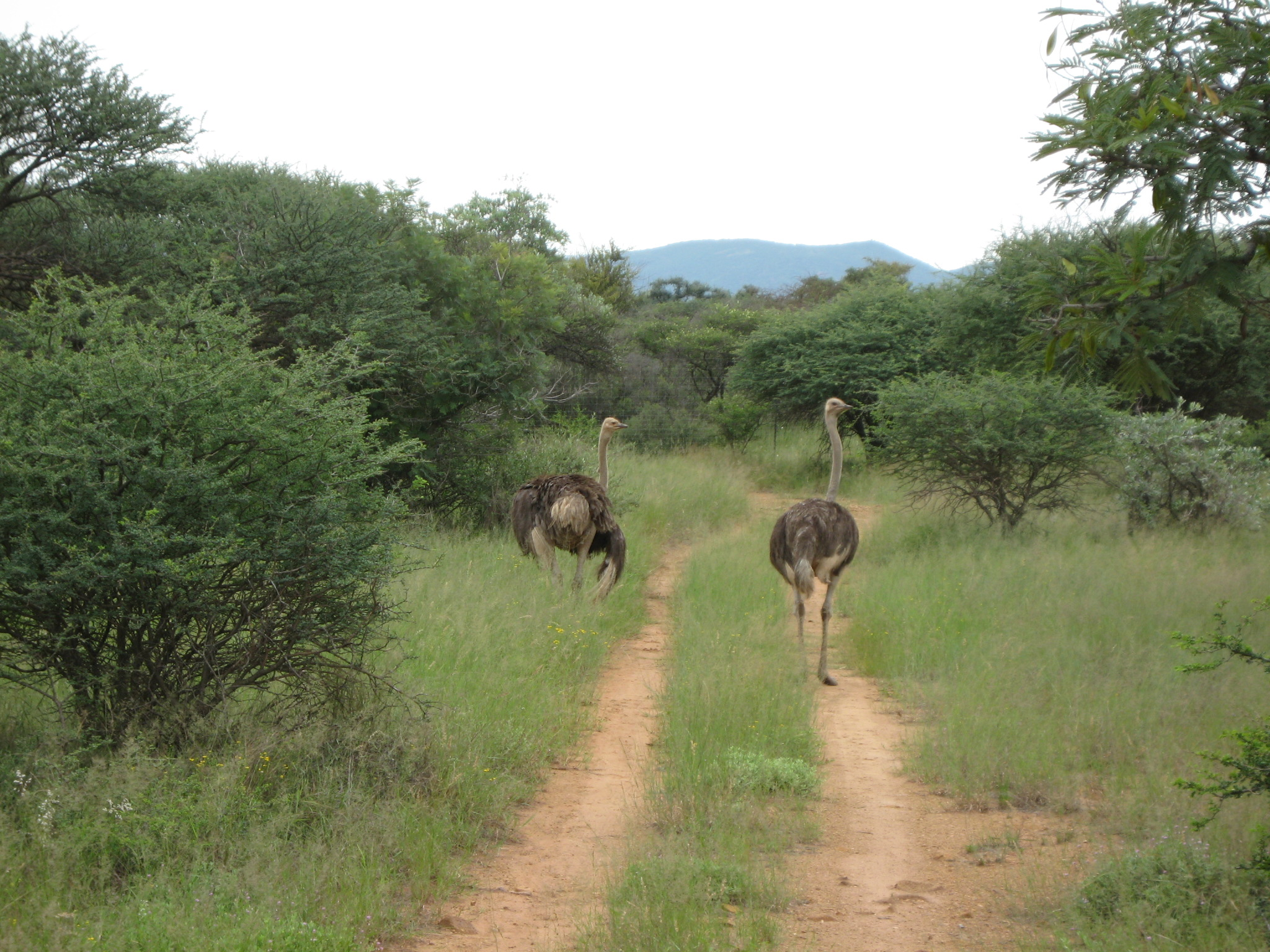
Ostriches at Mokolodi Nature Reserve, Botswana

Kgale Hill is located a few hundred metres from the city. The hill is nicknamed the Sleeping Giant and is 1,287 metres (4,222 ft). There are three different paths to reach the top, usually taking two hours.

The Mokolodi Nature Reserve is a 30-square-kilometre (12 sq mi) reserve that was created in 1994. It is located 12 kilometres (7.5 mi) south of Gaborone. There are many different species of animals found in the park such as common warthogs, steenbok, kudu, zebras, giraffes, common eland, ostriches, hippos and rhinos. The park helps with wildlife projects in Botswana that include: the reintroduction of the white rhino and the relocation of "problem" cheetahs. Mokolodi also holds the Education Centre, which teaches children about the conservation projects.

Somarelang Tikologo (Environment Watch Botswana) is a member-based environmental NGO housed inside an ecological park at the heart of Gaborone. The aim of the organization is to promote sustainable environmental protection by educating, demonstrating and encouraging best practices in environmental planning, resource conservation and waste management in Botswana. The park was officially opened by the Botswana Minister of Environment, Wildlife and Tourism, Onkokame kitso Mokaila on 27 February 2009. The park contains a playground for children to play on throughout the day, a community organic garden, a recycling drop-off center, and a shop where visitors can purchase products made of recycled material.

== Government ==
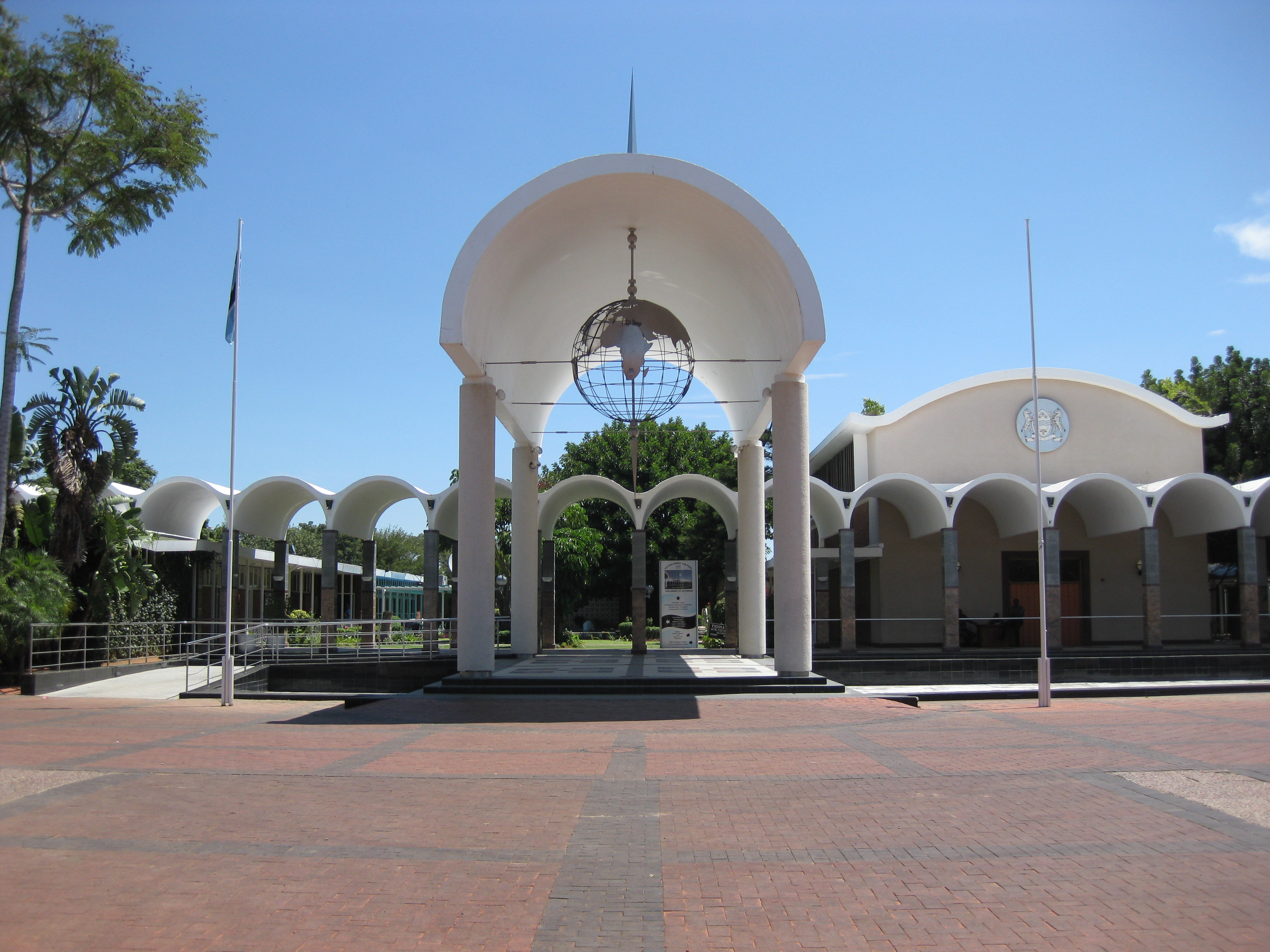
The National Assembly of Botswana

=== Local government ===
Gaborone is controlled by the Gaborone City Council, the wealthiest council in Botswana. It is composed of 35 councillors representing the wards of Gaborone. The Townships Act mandates the structure of local governments in Botswana. Because Botswana is a unitary state, the power of the local councils are delegated from the national level. The Ministry of Local Government, Land and Housing has a major influence in terms of personnel hiring and training, budgeting, and development planning.

The city commission-style council is run by the city clerk and the deputy city clerk. The city is governed by the mayor, deputy mayor, and several committees run by councillors: the financial and general purposes committee; the public health, social welfare and housing committee; the Self-Help Housing Agency (SHAA) management committee; the town planning committee; the trade licensing committee; and the education committee. The councillors elect the mayor in a first-past-the-post system and place each other in the committees yearly. The council has 2,515 employees.

An income tax called the Local Government Tax used to be the main source of income of the city council, but it was abolished. Today, the city council derives most of its revenue from property rates. City councillors feel that because of recurrent obligations, they have little room to institute new solutions.

The city council has been criticised by the Botswana Association of Local Authorities for its closed elections and minimal authority. In 2010, the council had problems with waste management: Frenic, the waste management company hired by the city, sued the Gaborone City Council for unpaid compensation. This has led to a buildup of uncollected garbage. Haskins Nkaigwa, mayor of Gaborone from 2011, has stressed the importance of more local autonomy. He advocates for a stronger city council with the power to determine budgets and hire and fire clerks and officers.

=== National government ===
Ministry of Labour and Home Affairs building

Ministry of Health building

Gaborone is the political centre of Botswana. Most government buildings are located west of the Main Mall in an area called the Government Enclave. The National Assembly of Botswana, the Ntlo ya Dikgosi, the National Archives, the Department of Taxes and Attorney General's Chambers Building, and the Ministry of Health. Near the entrance of the parliament building, there is a statue of Sir Seretse Khama, Botswana's first president as well as a memorial dedicated to the three hundred Batswana who were killed from 1939 to 1945. Another monument pays tribute to the Botswana Defence Force soldiers who died in the Rhodesian Bush War.

Before 1982, Gaborone held one parliamentary constituency, in the Parliament of Botswana. From 1982 to 1993, Gaborone was divided into two constituencies, Gaborone North and Gaborone South. A third seat in Parliament was given to a member elected for the whole city of Gaborone. In January 1993, two new constituencies were created: Gaborone West and Gaborone Central. For local government elections, the four constituencies were divided into wards. Gaborone North had seven, Gaborone West had seven. Gaborone Central had six, and Gaborone South had five. In 2019, the city had five constituencies: Gaborone North, Gaborone Central, Gaborone South, Gaborone Bonnington North, and Gaborone Bonnington South.

An International Law Enforcement Academy (ILEA) was established on 24 July 2000 in Gaborone. The academy would provide training for middle managers for the countries in the Southern African Development Community (SADC).

There are 21 diplomatic missions in Gaborone.

== Education ==
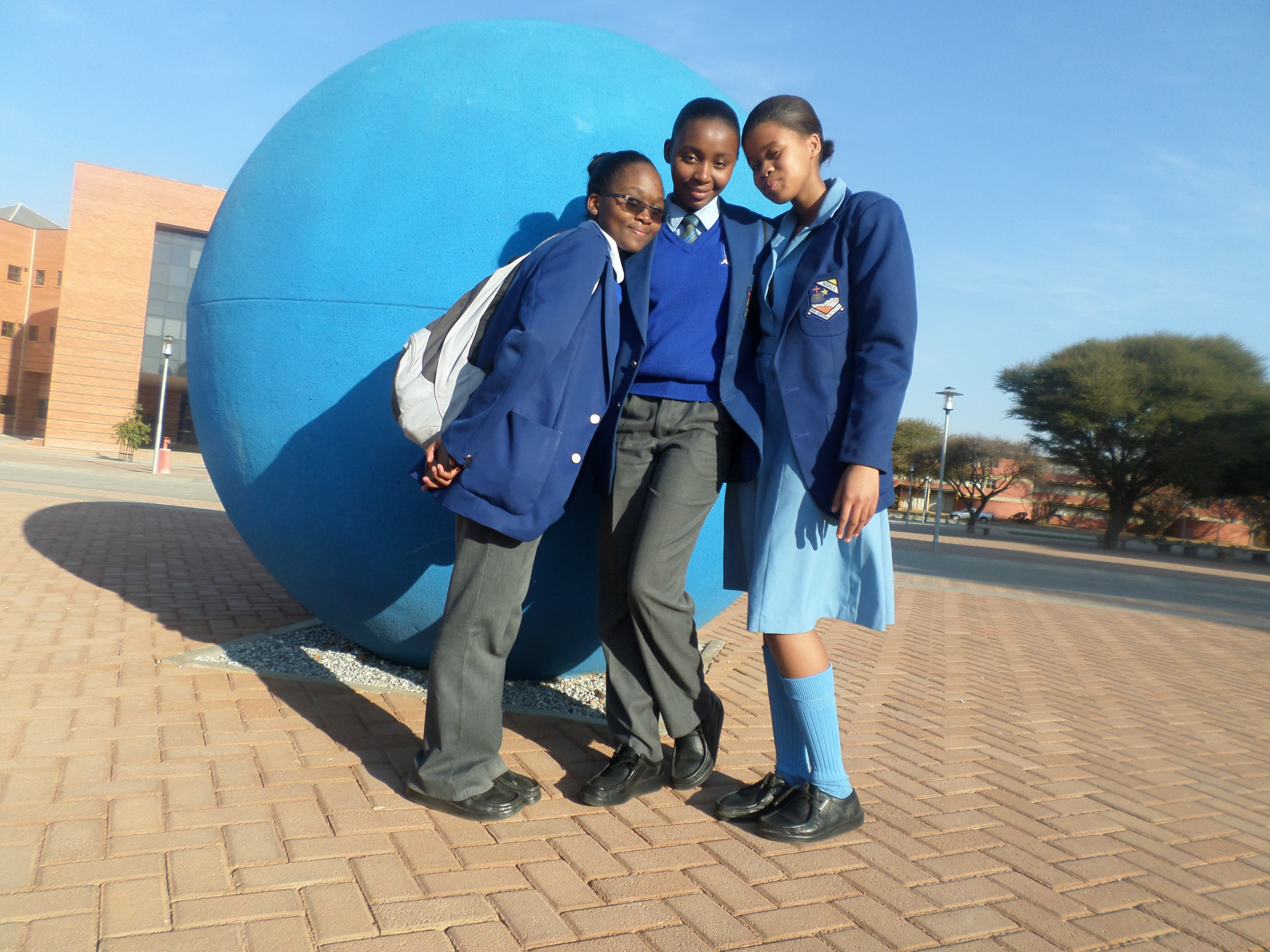
St. Joseph's College students

There are more people who have earned a degree or postgraduate qualifications in Gaborone than anywhere else in Botswana. 70.9% of the population of Gaborone have earned at least a secondary-level education 2.6% of the population of Gaborone has never attended school.

Gaborone has many primary and secondary schools, both public and private. These include Westwood International School, Maru-a-Pula School, St. Joseph's College, Kgale, Legae Academy, Northside Primary School, Thornhill Primary School and Hillcrest International School. Seventeen of the sixty private schools in Botswana are located in Gaborone.

The main campus of the University of Botswana (which was established in 1982) is on the eastern extent of the city.

In addition there are other universities or institutions of higher education that cater to specialized study and instruction.

- Limkokwing University Of Creative Technology (which also has a campus in Gaborone)
- Botswana Accountancy College (which caters to both accounting and IT students)
- Botswana Institute of Administration and Commerce
- Botswana Open University (offering long-distance learning)
- Gaborone Technical College
- Boitekanelo College
- Botho University (which offers courses ranging from computing, accounting and finance, business, engineering and health information management)
- Botswana University of Agriculture and Natural Resources, situated approximately 15 kilometres (9.3 mi) from the city centre

Further, in year 2006, the Gaborone Universal College of Law, opened its main campus in Gaborone, with its first group of students graduating in 2010.

== Media ==
Newspapers published in Gaborone include Mmegi, The Botswana Gazette, The Monitor, Midweek Sun, The Patriot on Sunday, Sunday Standard, and The Voice. Magazines published are Lapologa, Peolwane, Kutwlano among others.

Radio station Yarona FM broadcasts from Gaborone; its frequency in Gaborone is 106.6 FM. Another small, local radio station in Gaborone is Gabz FM, Duma FM & Yarona FM. 86.6% of Gaborone households own a working radio.

Before 2000, residents of Gaborone received television programming from BOP TV in Mahikeng via a repeating transmitter on the summit of Kgale Hill. Today, the Gaborone Broadcasting Company and Botswana TV provide television programming for Gaborone. 78.7% of the households in Gaborone have a working television. Other local channels based in Gaborone are Now TV, Khuduga HD, Access TV & Maru TV.

93.7% of the households in Gaborone have a cell phone.

== Infrastructure ==
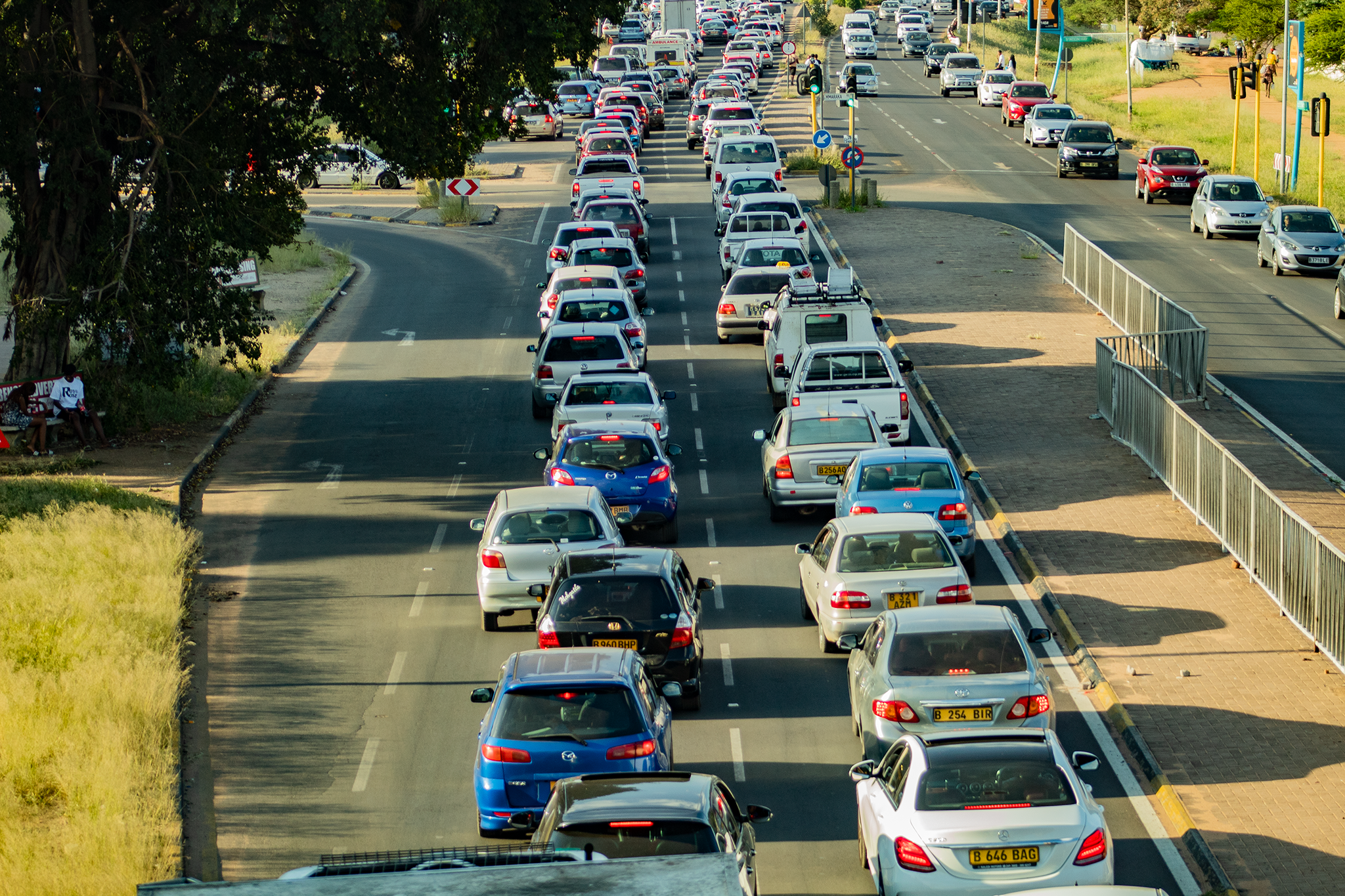
Traffic in Gaborone

Gaborone is one of the fastest-growing cities in Africa. The growth of Gaborone, especially suburban growth, has caused much of the farmland surrounding the city to be absorbed into the city. Much of the food for Gaborone comes from north of the city with some smaller-scale farms on the southern end. The city centre was planned to be functionalist, with major buildings designed and built in the style of Modern architecture. The city is surrounded by smaller buildings. The city's central business district (CBD) is still under construction so when one says downtown, they actually mean the Main Mall and Government Enclave areas where tall buildings are usually found. The Main Mall, a car-free shopping and commercial area, runs in an east–west direction with the Government Enclave and National Assembly on the west end and the Gaborone City Town Council complex on the east.

Gaborone's CBD is home to the new Square Mall, The Tower, the new SADC headquarters, the Industrial Court, a court specifically for settling trade disputes, and the Three Dikgosi Monument, a landmark featuring the statues of Khama III, Sebele I, and Bathoen I, three dikgosi, or chiefs, who traveled to Great Britain to establish the Bechuanaland Protectorate separate from Southern Rhodesia (present-day Zimbabwe) or the Cape Colony (present-day South Africa). The monument was inaugurated on 29 September 2005. While the statues represent famous historical figures, there has been some controversy over the cost of the construction, P12,000,000 (approx. US$1.7M, €1.4M, or £1.1M as of June 2010), and over the construction company, North Korean Mansudae Overseas Projects, putting the wrong inscription date. Other buildings under construction in the CBD include the Holiday Inn Gaborone, retail space, and office space.

=== Utilities ===
The city gets most of its water from the reservoir formed from the Gaborone Dam on the southeast side of the city, which has facilitated growth. The city of Gaborone was originally constructed as a small town, so the Gaborone Dam needed to be built to provide water for all its citizens.

From 2007 to 2008, 23,963,000 cubic metres (31,342,000 cu yd) of water was sold in Gaborone. The government sector bought the most water, 11,359,000 cubic metres (14,857,000 cu yd). 8,564,000 cubic metres (11,200,000 cu yd) of water was bought for domestic use, and 4,040,000 cubic metres (5,280,000 cu yd) of water was bought by the commercial and industrial sectors. In 2008, the city of Gaborone consumed 25,657,363 kilolitres (33,558,564 cu yd) of water, and the water consumption per capita was 0.184 cubic metres (0.241 cu yd) per person per year, the lowest rate since 1999.

Gaborone has some of the highest water tariffs in the country because of high transportation costs and high water consumption. The high tariffs may also be due to the fact that some of Gaborone's water supply is imported from the Letsibogo Dam.

The average pH of the water in the Gaborone Dam is 7.95 as of February 2006. The concentration of calcium in the reservoir was 14.87milligrams per litre from April 2001 to August 2006. During the same period, the concentration of calcium carbonate (CaCO_{3}) was 57.73 milligrams per litre, slightly over Botswana's ideal concentration which means the water is hard. Also during the same period, the chloride concentration was 6.44 mg/l, the fluoride concentration was 0.54 mg/l, the potassium concentration was 6.72 mg/l, and the sodium concentration was 10.76 mg/l.

== Healthcare ==
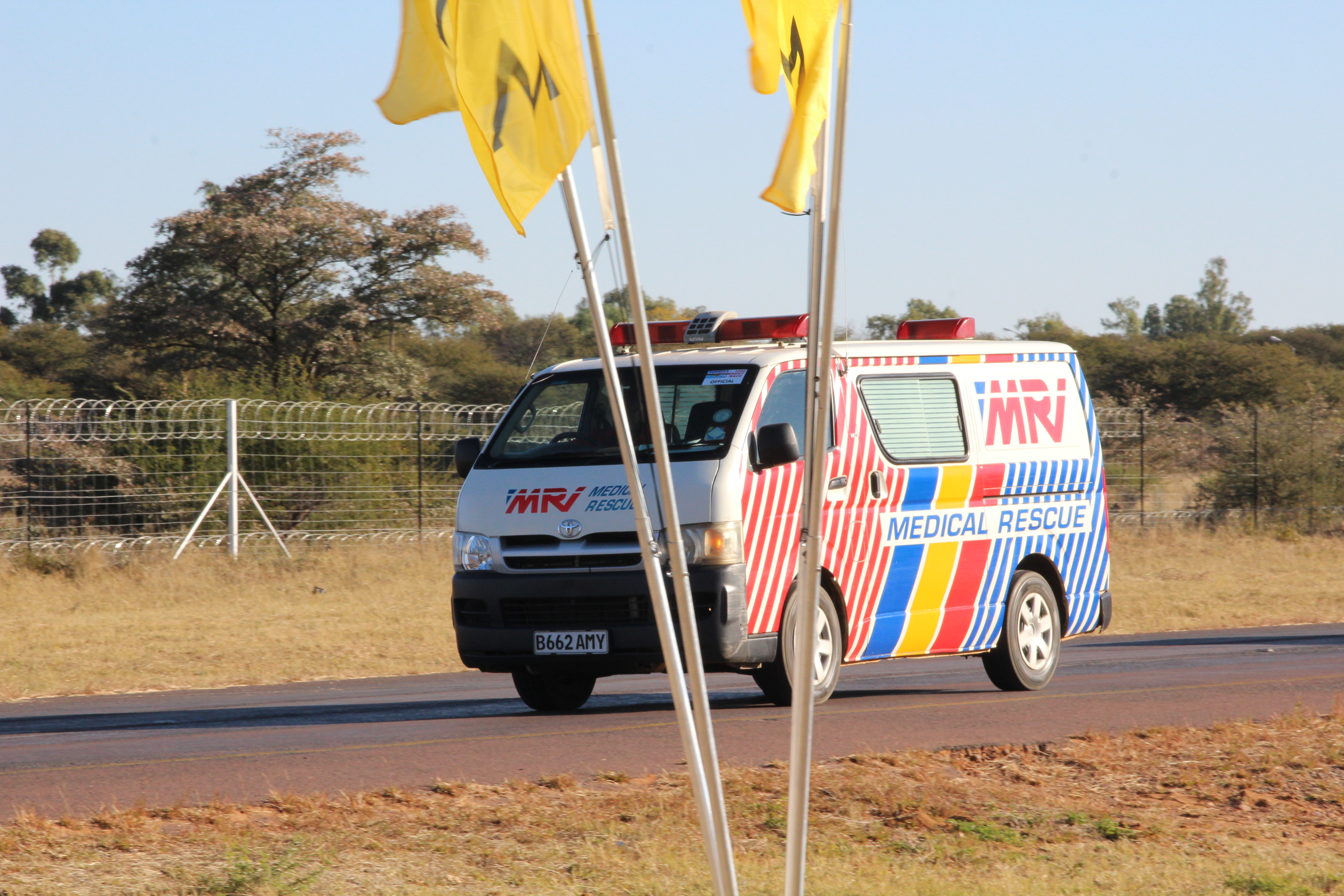
Medical rescue team car

The Botswana Red Cross Society, established in 1968, is headquartered in Gaborone. The Princess Marina Hospital is the main referral hospital in Gaborone and houses 500 beds. There is also Gaborone Private Hospital and Sidilega Private Hospital all operating in the city of Gaborone. The Cancer Association of Botswana is a voluntary non-governmental organization established as a trust in 1998.

=== HIV/AIDS ===
AIDS is a very serious problem in Gaborone. 17,773 Gaborone citizens, 17.1% of the total population of Gaborone, have tested positive for HIV. There is a higher prevalence of HIV among women; 20.5% of women have tested positive compared to 13.6% of men. The population between 45 and 49 years of age are most likely to have AIDS with 35.4% of the residents in that age group testing positive.

HIV/AIDS education is extensive in Gaborone. However, a 2008 study shows that 14.5% of Gaborone residents between 10 and 64 who have heard of HIV/AIDS believe that HIV can be spread through witchcraft, and 31.3% of the residents believe HIV can be spread through mosquito bites.

== Transportation ==
=== Railways ===
The railway that served the founding purpose of the city remains important, bisecting the city in a north–south direction. Botswana Railways runs a line that goes from Cape Town to Harare via Bulawayo. The railway station in Gaborone is located south of the Parliament House in the city's centre. The line stops at the following cities in and near Botswana: Ramatlabama on the South African border, Lobatse, Gaborone, Palapye, Serule, Francistown, Ramokgwebana, and Plumtree, Zimbabwe. The line became a cargo-only line on 1 April 2009 but passenger services resumed in early 2016.

=== Airports ===
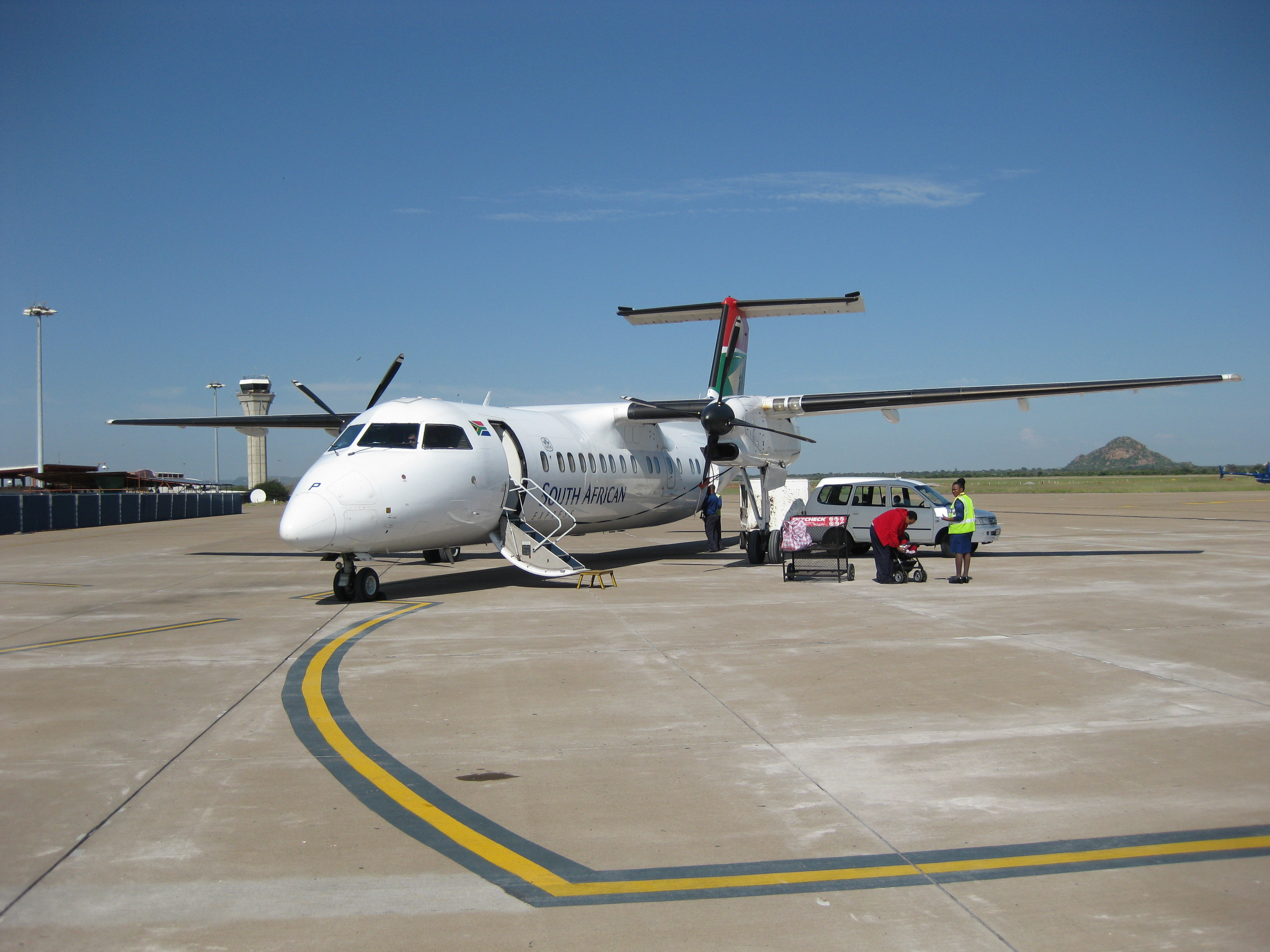
Sir Seretse Khama International Airport (GBE)

Sir Seretse Khama International Airport (ICAO code: FBSK IATA code: GBE) lies 25 kilometres (16 mi) north of the city and in 2018 has flights to Cape Town, Johannesburg, Durban, Addis Ababa and various domestic destinations. It is the headquarters of Air Botswana, the national airline of Botswana.

In 2008, Sir Seretse Khama International Airport handled 15,844 aircraft movements, second only to Maun Airport (ICAO code: FMBN IATA code: MUB) Air traffic in Gaborone has decreased since 2006. However, Gaborone has the most air passenger traffic, accounting for 51.6% of all passenger movement in Botswana. International passengers total 244,073 passengers while domestic air passenger movement comes up to 333,390 passengers. Gaborone International Airport terminal was rebuilt into a modern terminal in 2010.

=== Roads ===
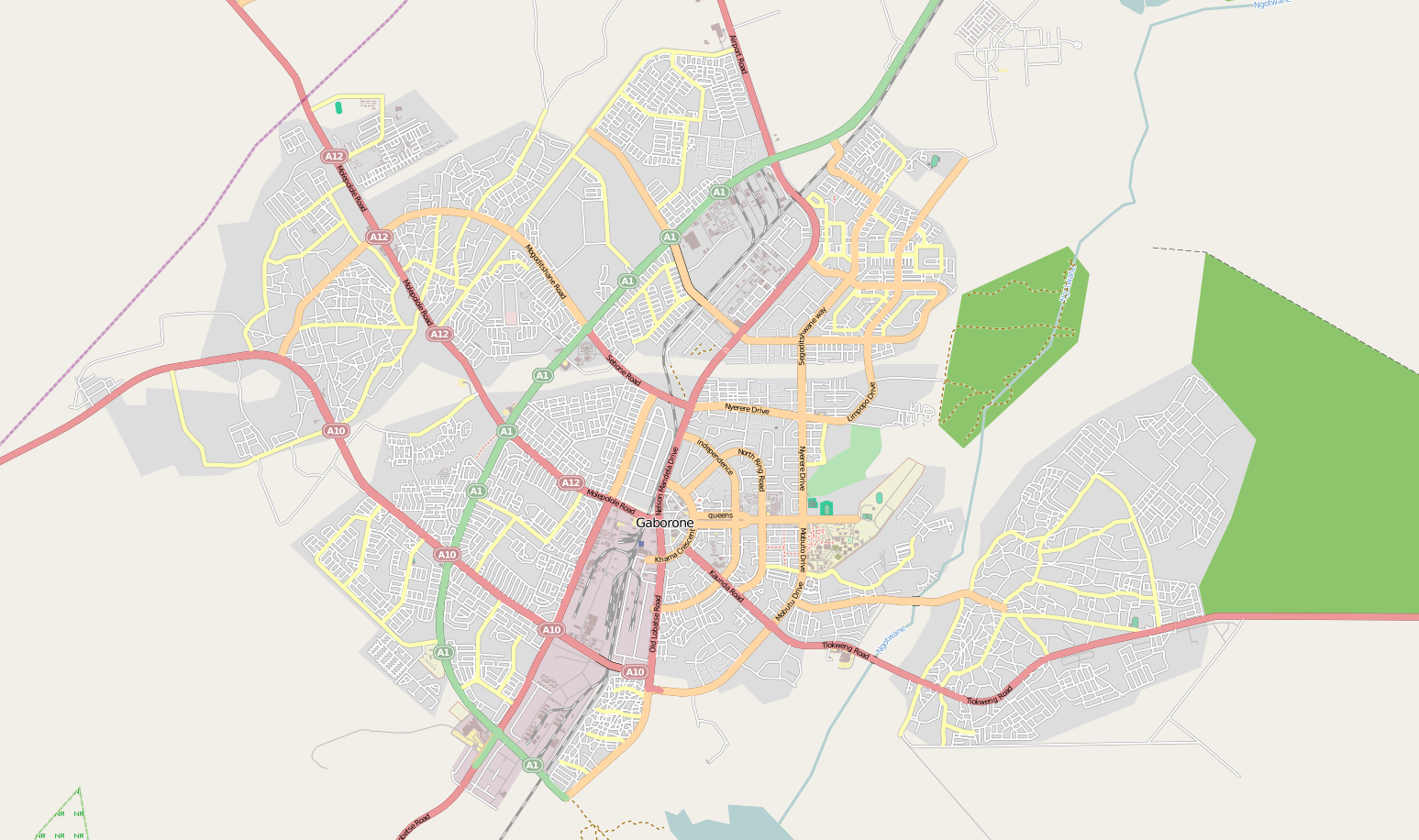
Road map of Gaborone

Highways in and around Gaborone include the Trans-Kalahari Highway, A1 Highway, A10 Highway and the Cairo-Cape Town Highway. There are five major roads in Gaborone that go to Lobatse, Kanye, Molepolole, Francistown via Mochudi, and Tlokweng.

=== Public transport ===
Kombi

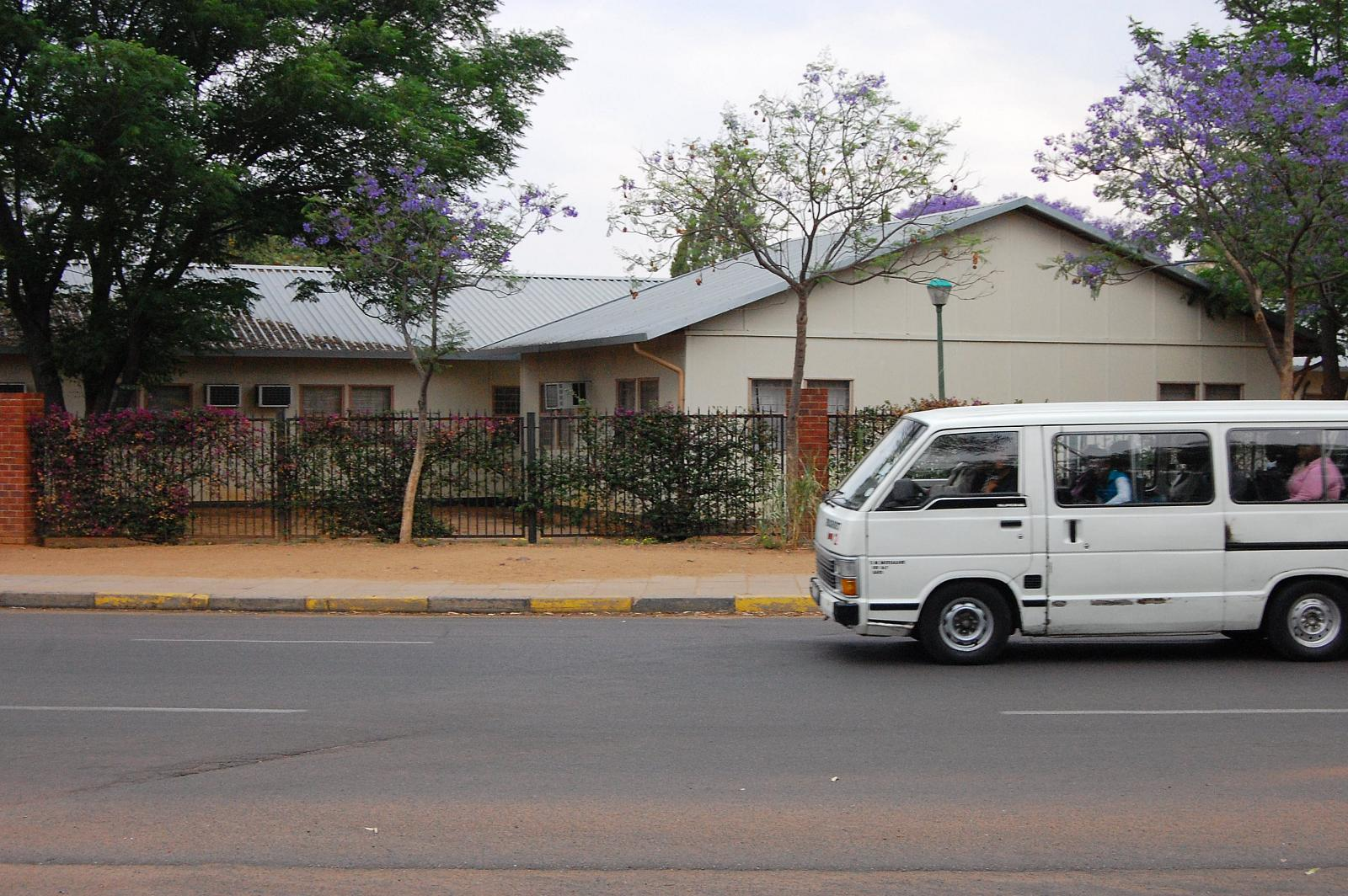
Kombi (Minibus taxi)

Public transport in the city is generally reliable, when compared with major African cities. Kombis (small vans) and taxis ply the routes within the city, while buses serve surrounding villages and other towns in Botswana.

=== Private traffic ===
Gaborone has several vehicle licensing stations. 15,538 new private motor vehicles, accounting for 46.5% of Botswana's total new vehicle registrations, were registered in Gaborone in 2008, of which 8,440 were passenger cars, 440 were minibuses, 204 were motorcycles, and 181 were tractors. The total has increased from 12,690 new vehicle registrations in 2007. Gaborone also has the highest number of vehicle registration renewals at 73,206 in 2008.

Including the district of Gaborone West, Gaborone had 9,415 vehicle accidents with 74 human fatalities in 2008. Most of the traffic collisions in that year, 3,146 collisions, were side collisions. 263 accidents involved animals. The city has also seen 679 pedestrian casualties in 2008; 24 pedestrians were killed. The majority of vehicle accident casualties involved pedestrians, and most traffic accidents occur between 16:00 and 18:00.

== Notable people ==
- Letsile Tebogo (b. 2003) Motswana Athlete, Sprinter, won the silver medal at the 2023 World Championships in the 100 m.

- Kgosi Gaborone (c. 1825–1931), Motswana chief, after whom the city is named
- Alec Campbell (1932–2012), archaeologist and museum curator
- Tjawangwa Dema (born 1981), poet
- Thamsanga Mnyele (1948–1985), member of the African National Congress and artist
- Vernon Nkadimeng (1958–1985), member of the African National Congress, killed in Gaborone by the apartheid police
- Boniface Tshosa Setlalekgosi (b. 1927), Roman Catholic bishop of the Diocese of Gaborone, Botswana from 1981 to 2009
- Wally Serote (b. 1944), poet and anti-apartheid activist
- Dipsy Selolwane (b. 1978), football player
- Mpule Kwelagobe (b. 1979), Miss World Botswana 1997, Miss Universe Botswana 1999 and Miss Universe 1999
- Kefilwe Monosi, photographer
- Alister Walker (b. 1982), squash player
- Abednico Powell (b. 1983), football player
- Joel Mogorosi (b. 1984), football player
- Dirang Moloi (b. 1985), member of the Botswana national football team
- Donald Molosi (b. 1985), actor, writer and playwright attended Maru a Pula School in his teens, and the National Arts Festival in South Africa
- Sumaiyah Marope (c. 1987), Miss Botswana 2009
- Emma Wareus (b. 1990), Miss World Botswana 2010, first runner-up to Miss World 2010
- Matsieng, a Setswana traditional music group, formed in Gaborone in 2005

== International relations ==
Gaborone has been twinned with:

- Burbank, United States

== Gallery ==
Flag map of Gaborone

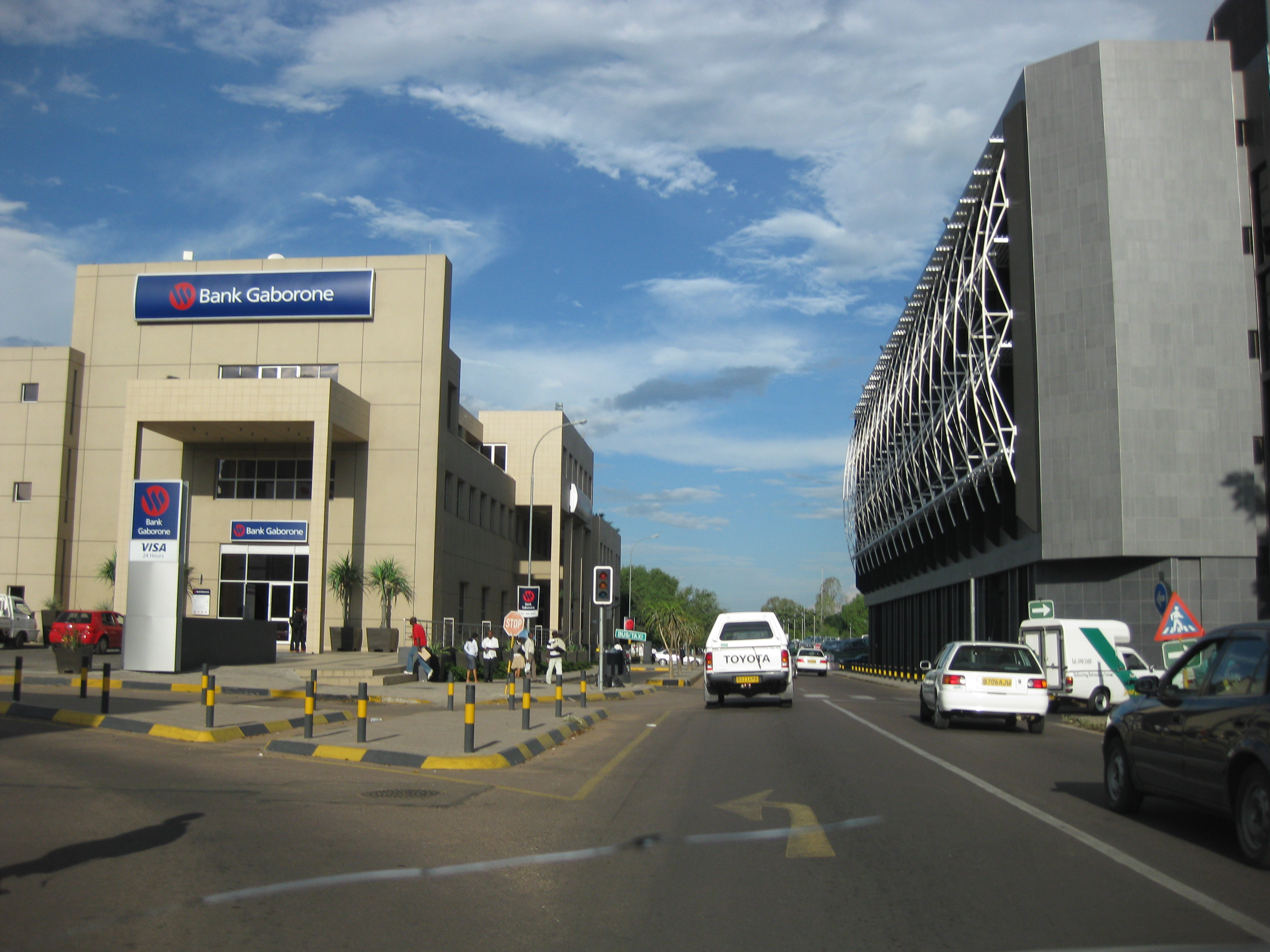
Street scene near the Main Mall

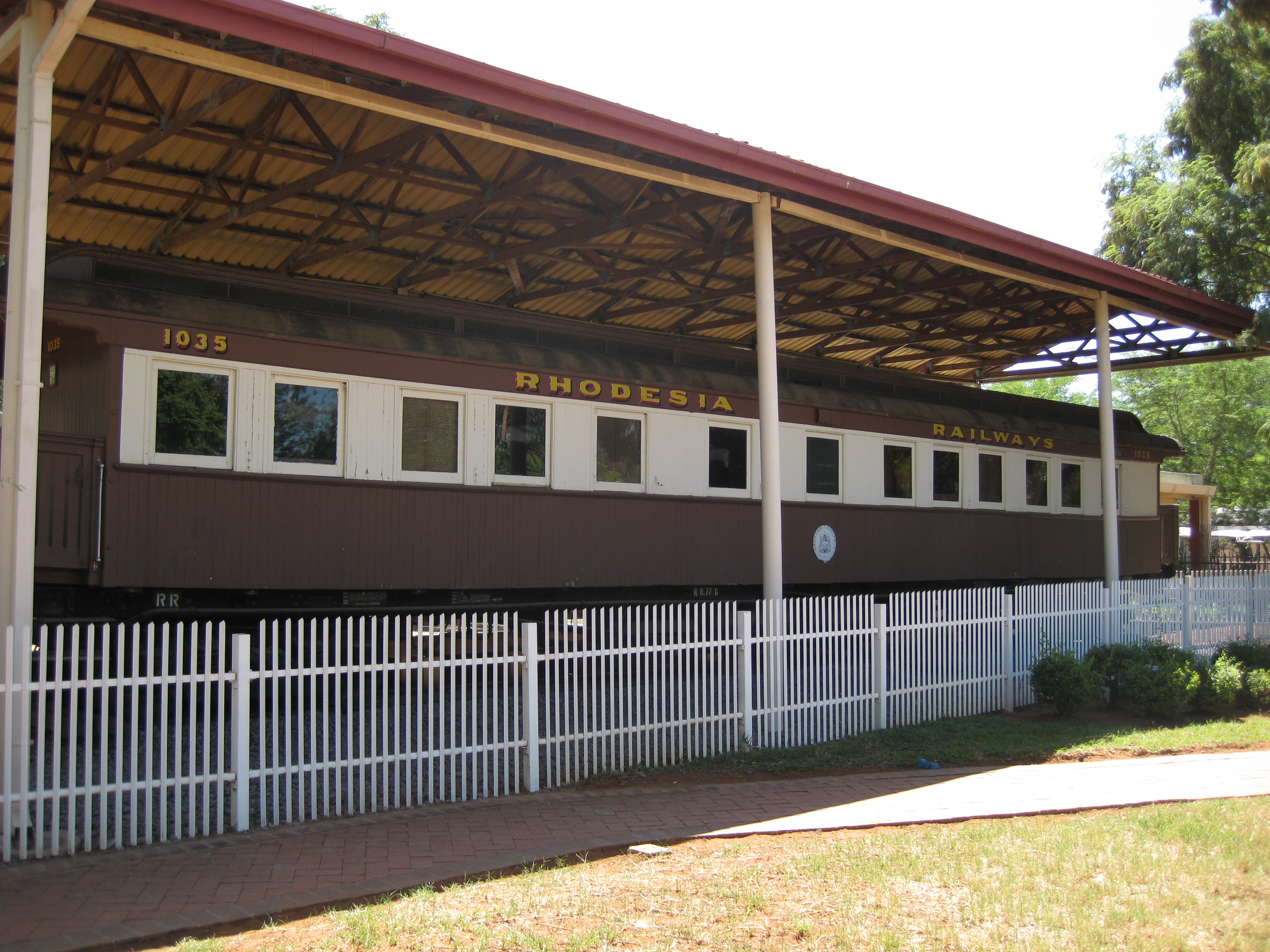
Rhodesia Railways car at the national museum

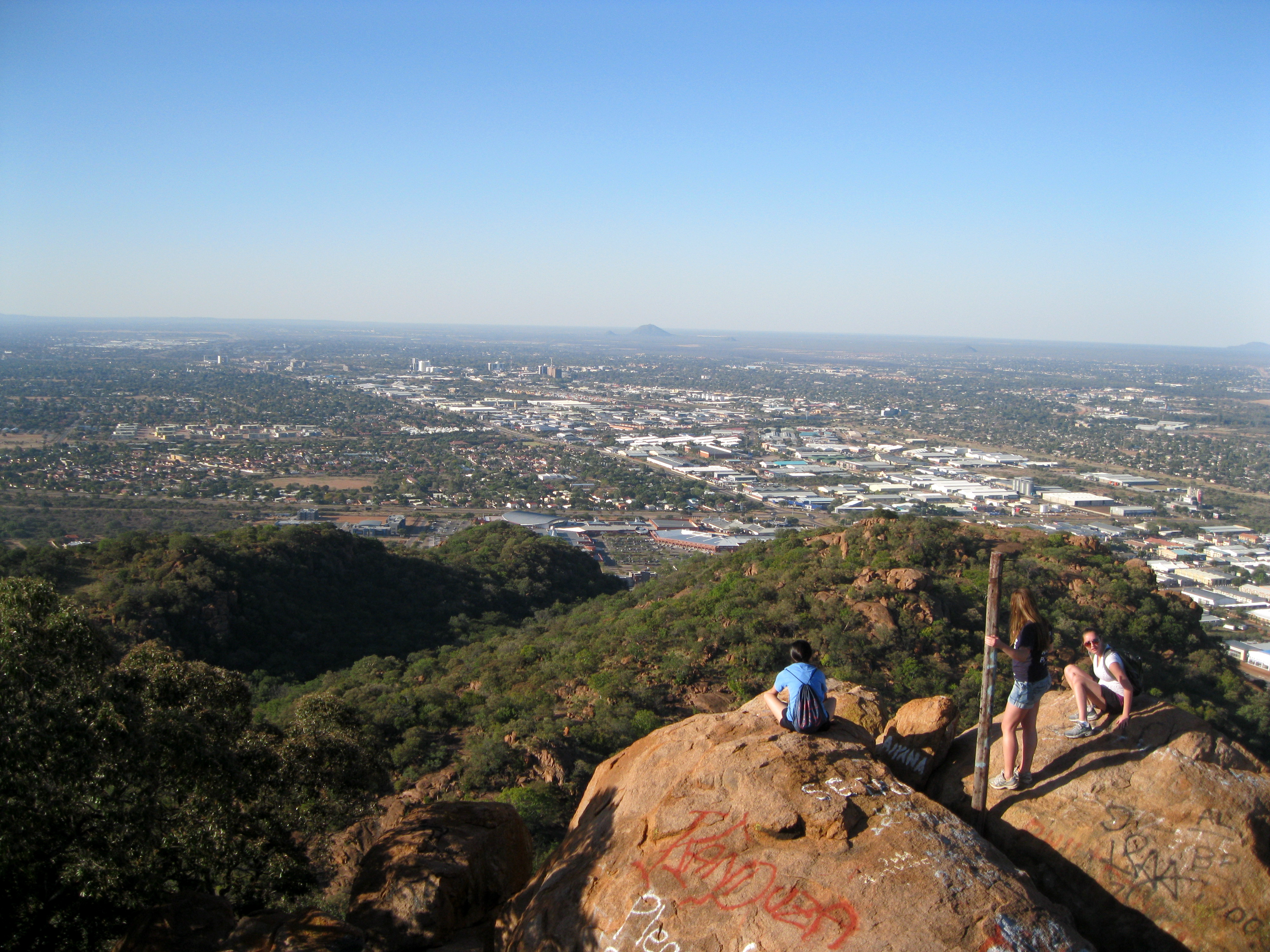
View from Kgale Hill (Oodi Hill on horizon)

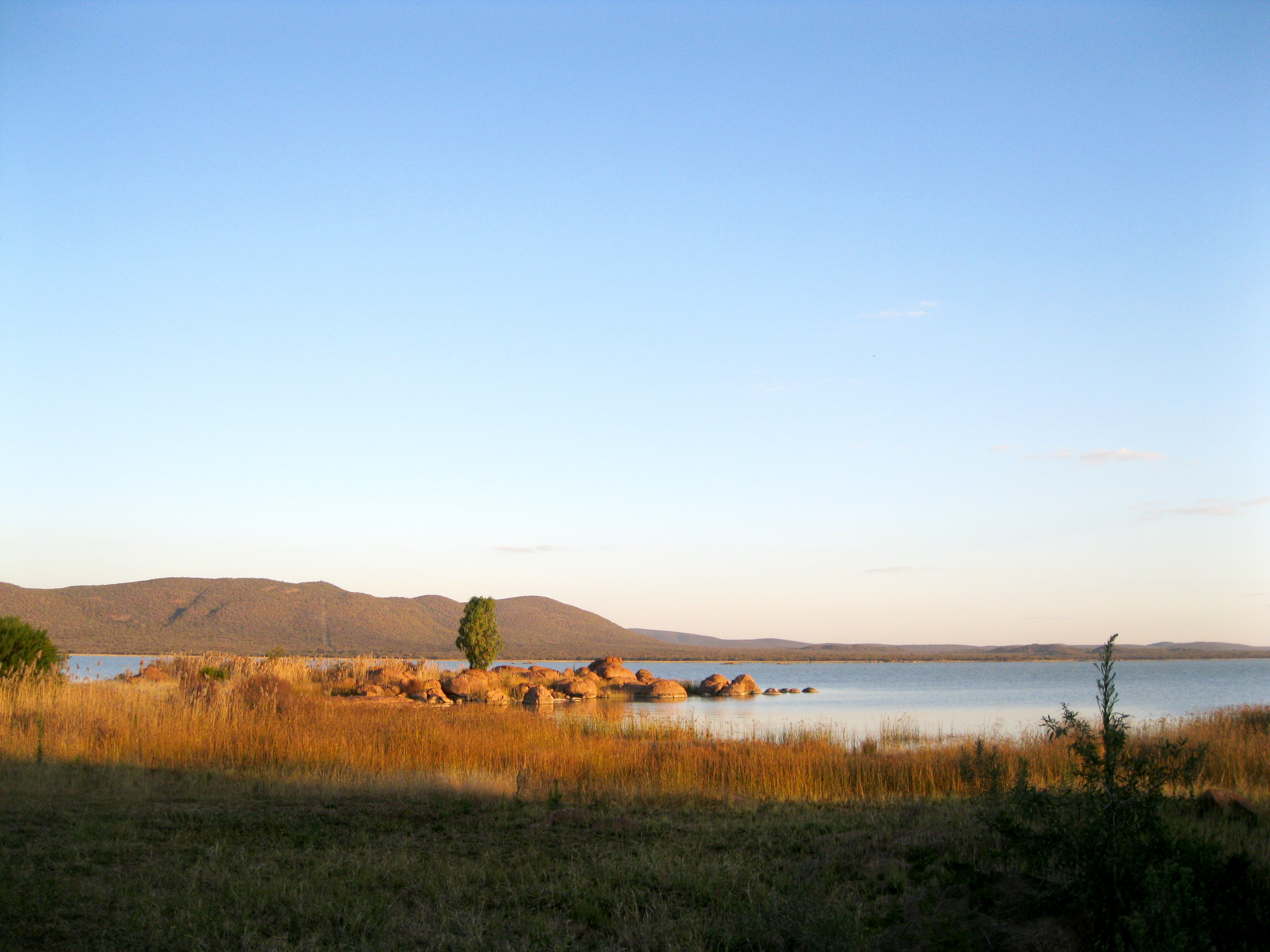
Gaborone Dam

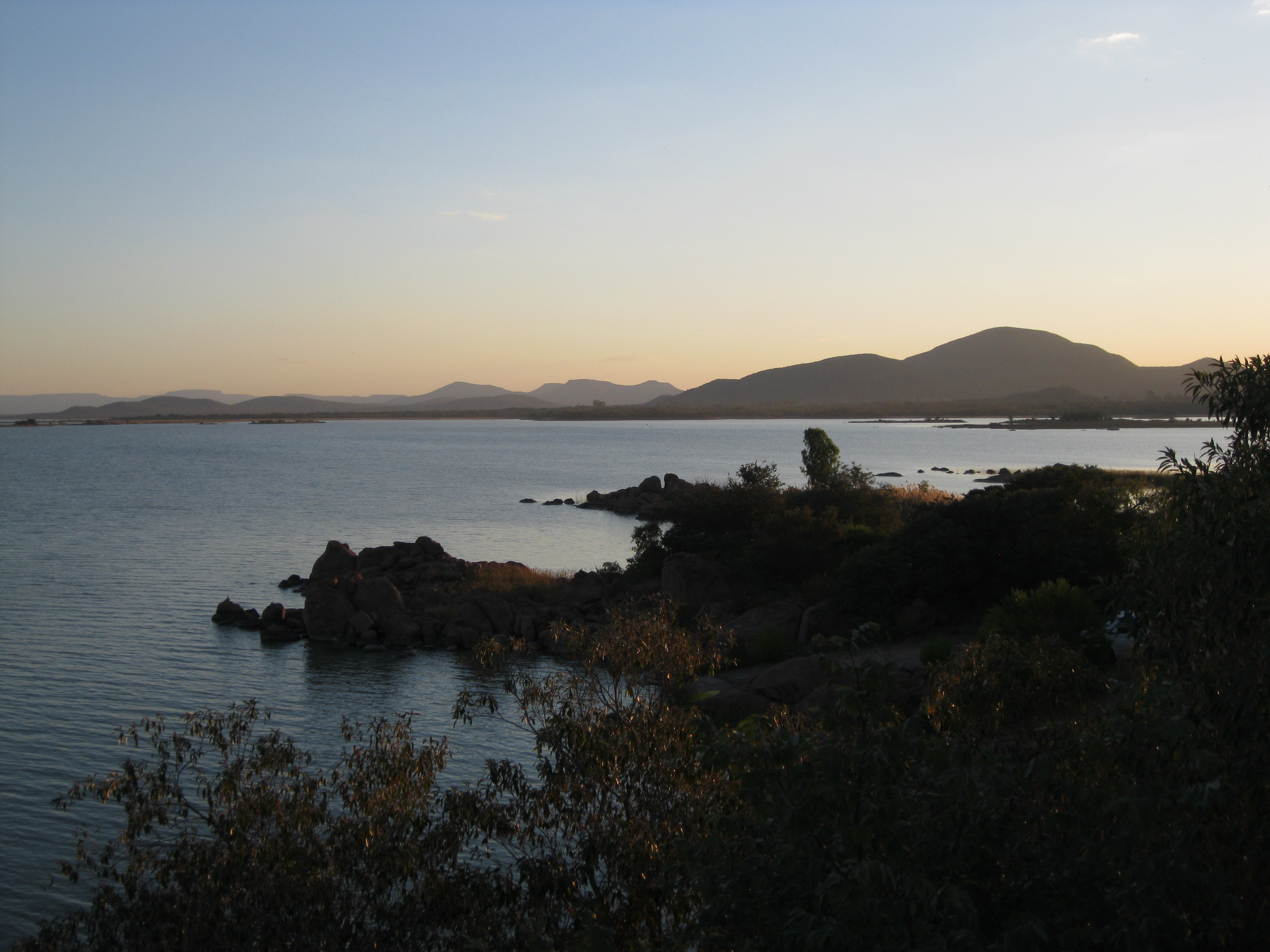
Gaborone Dam

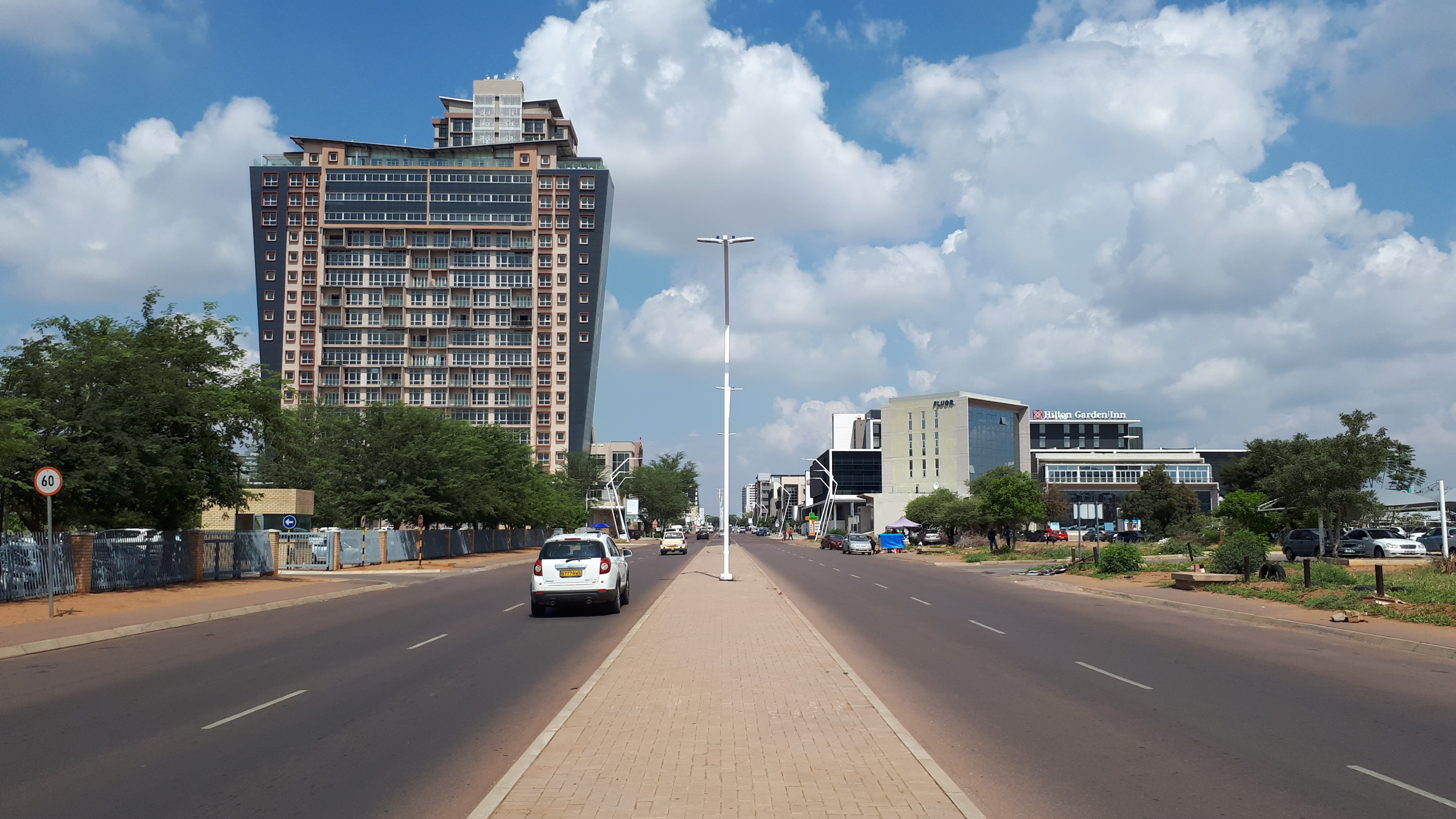
Botswana Gaborone I Towers

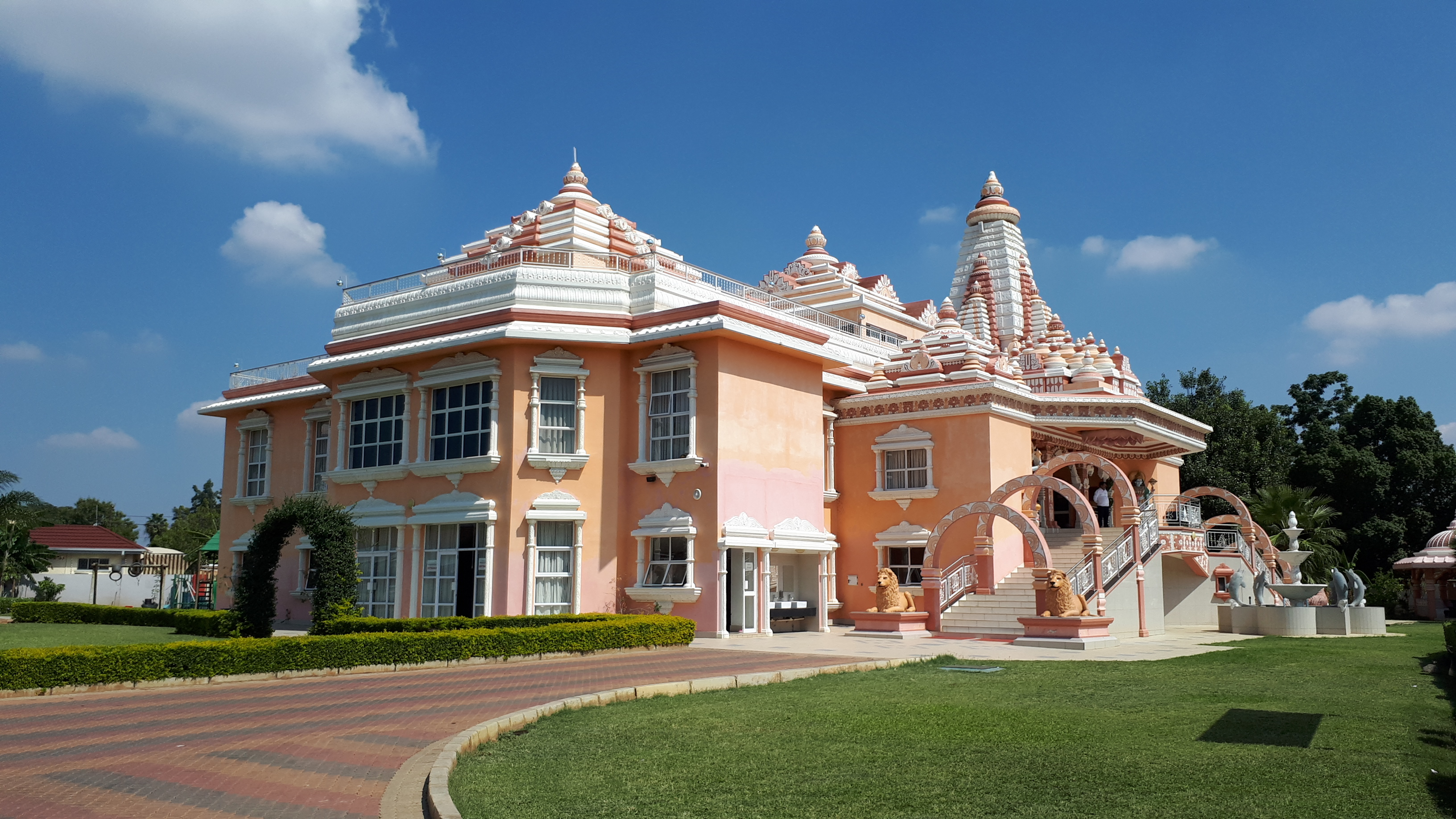
Gaborone Hindu Temple

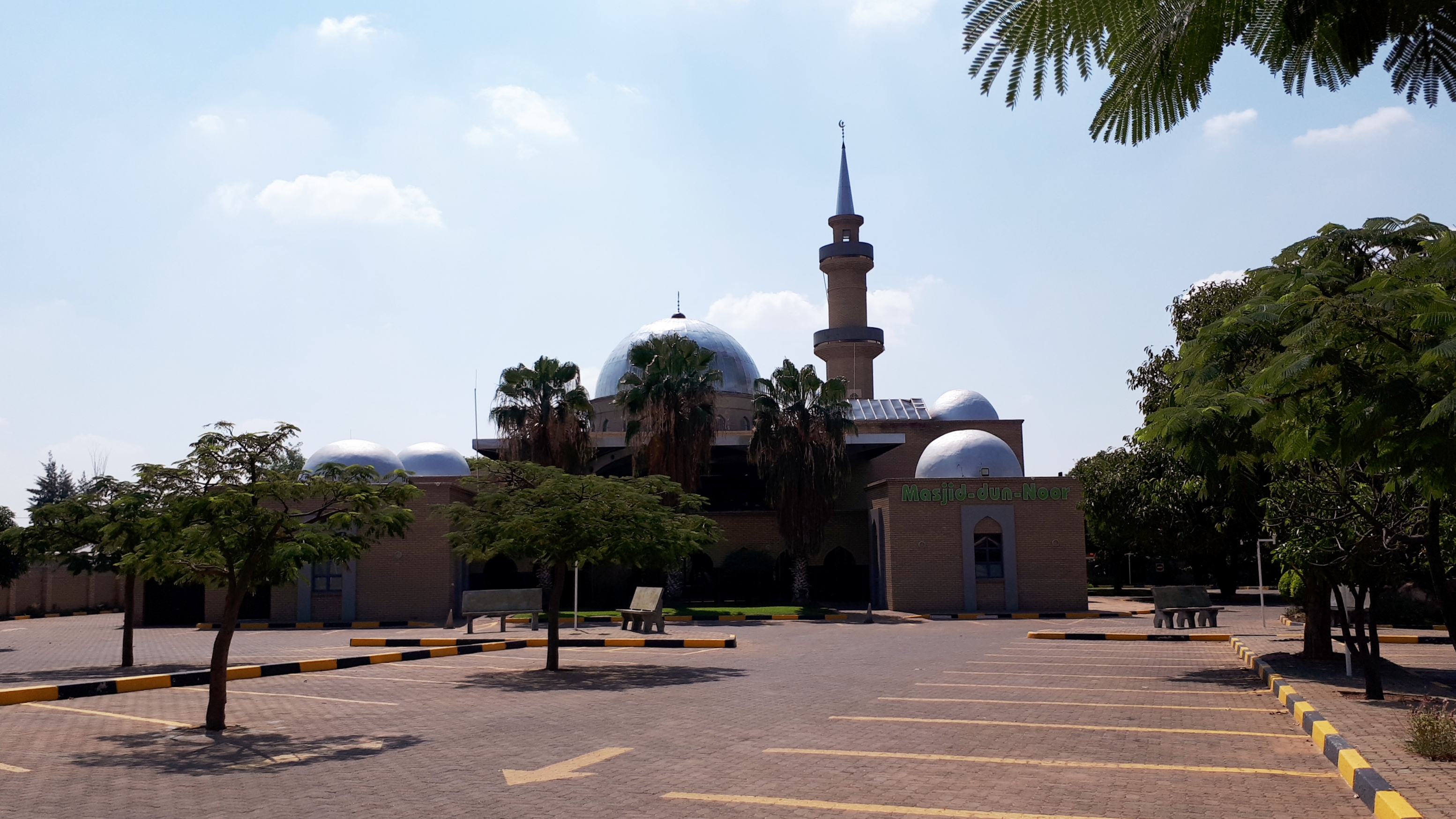
Gaborone Mosque

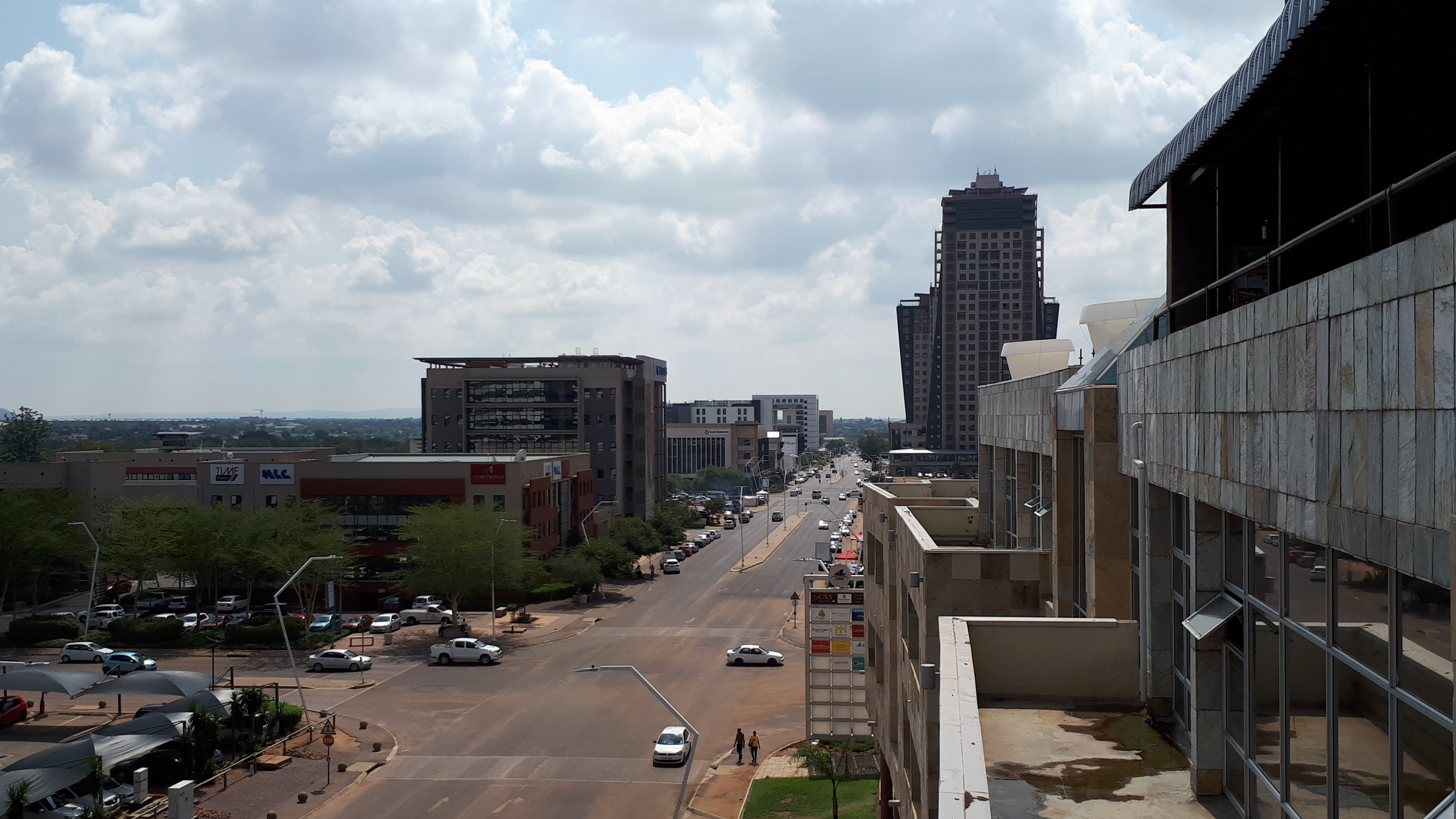
CBD

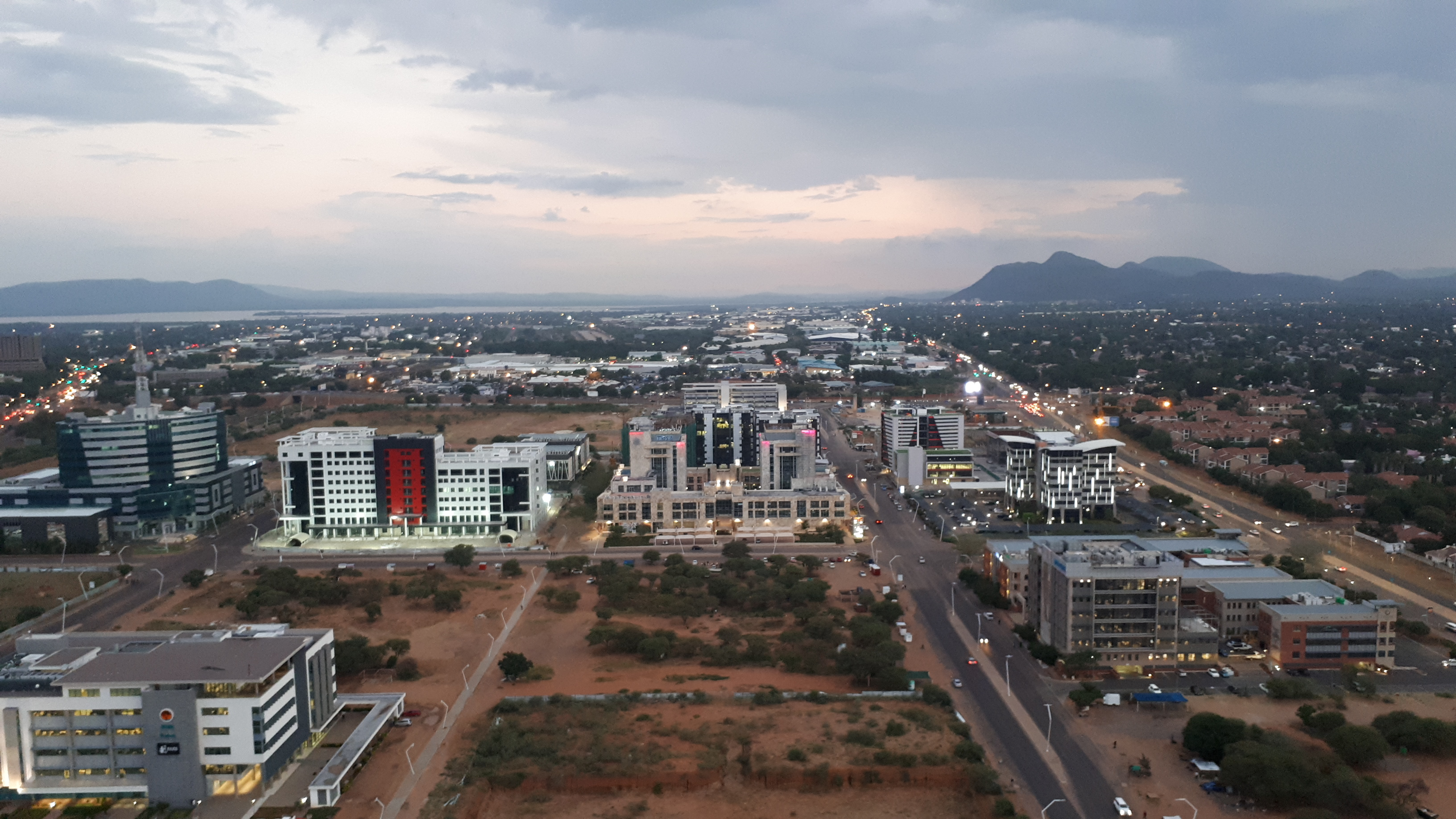
CBD Developments

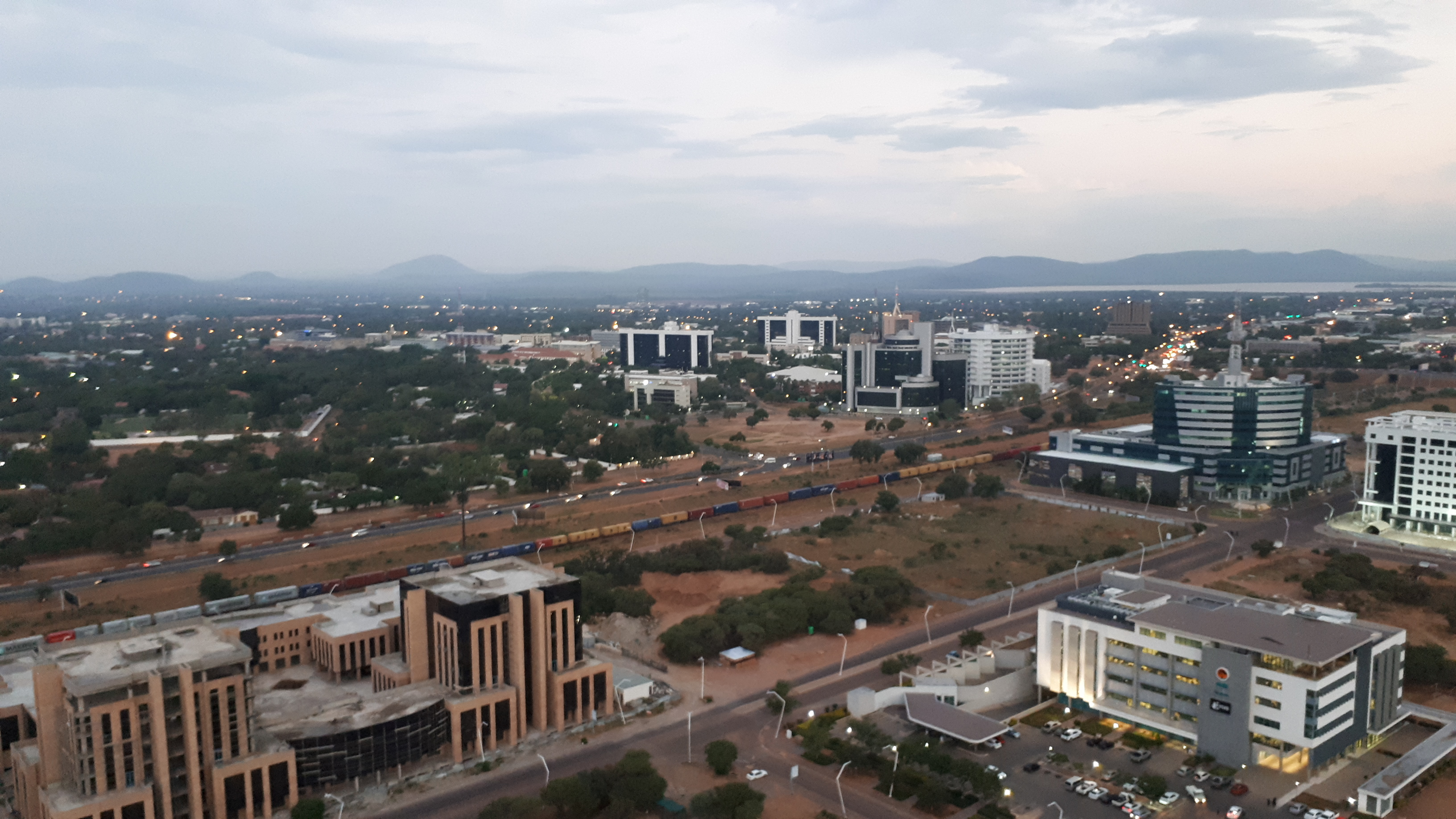
New Construction Developments

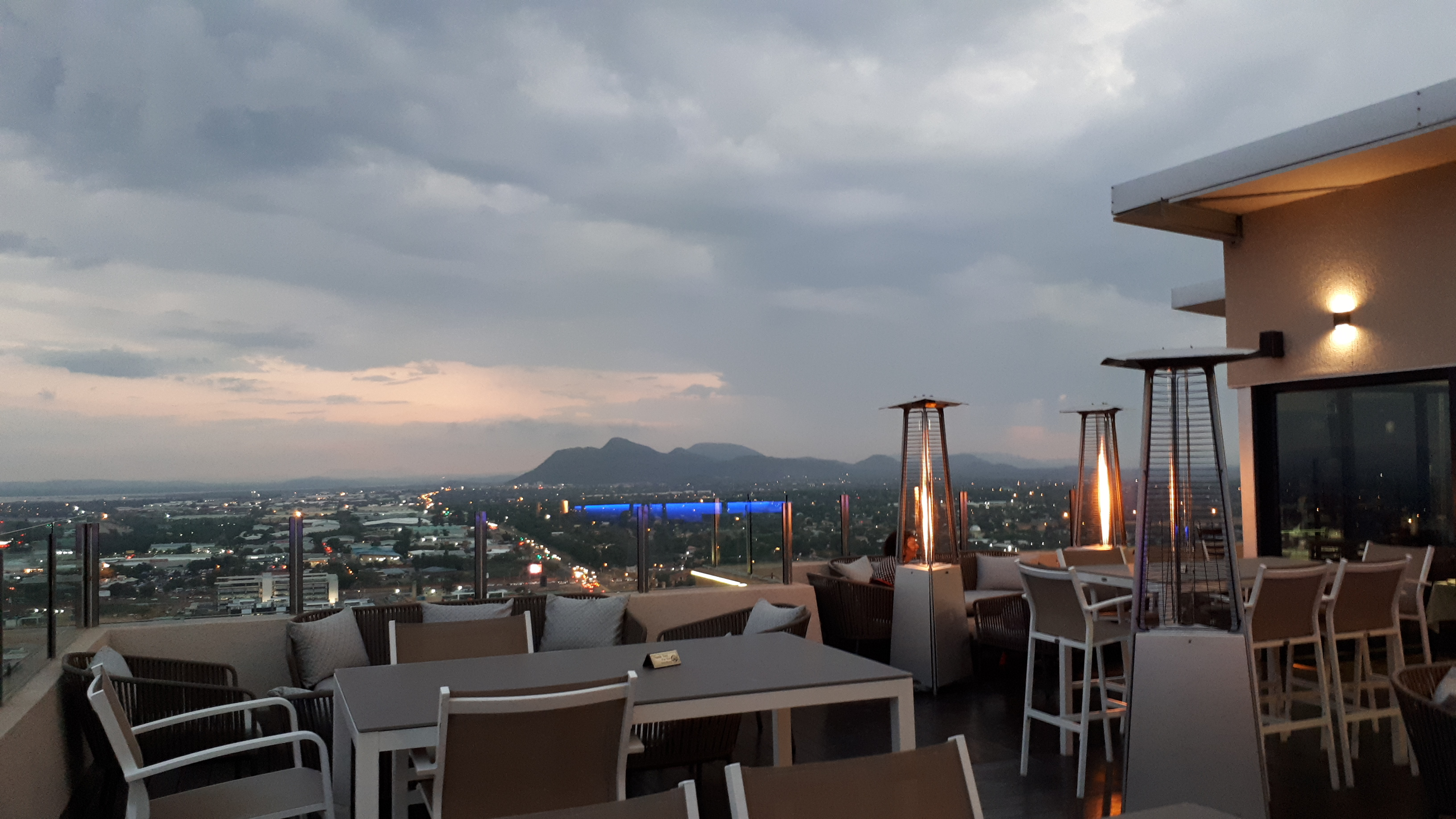
Room 52 Roof Top Restaurant

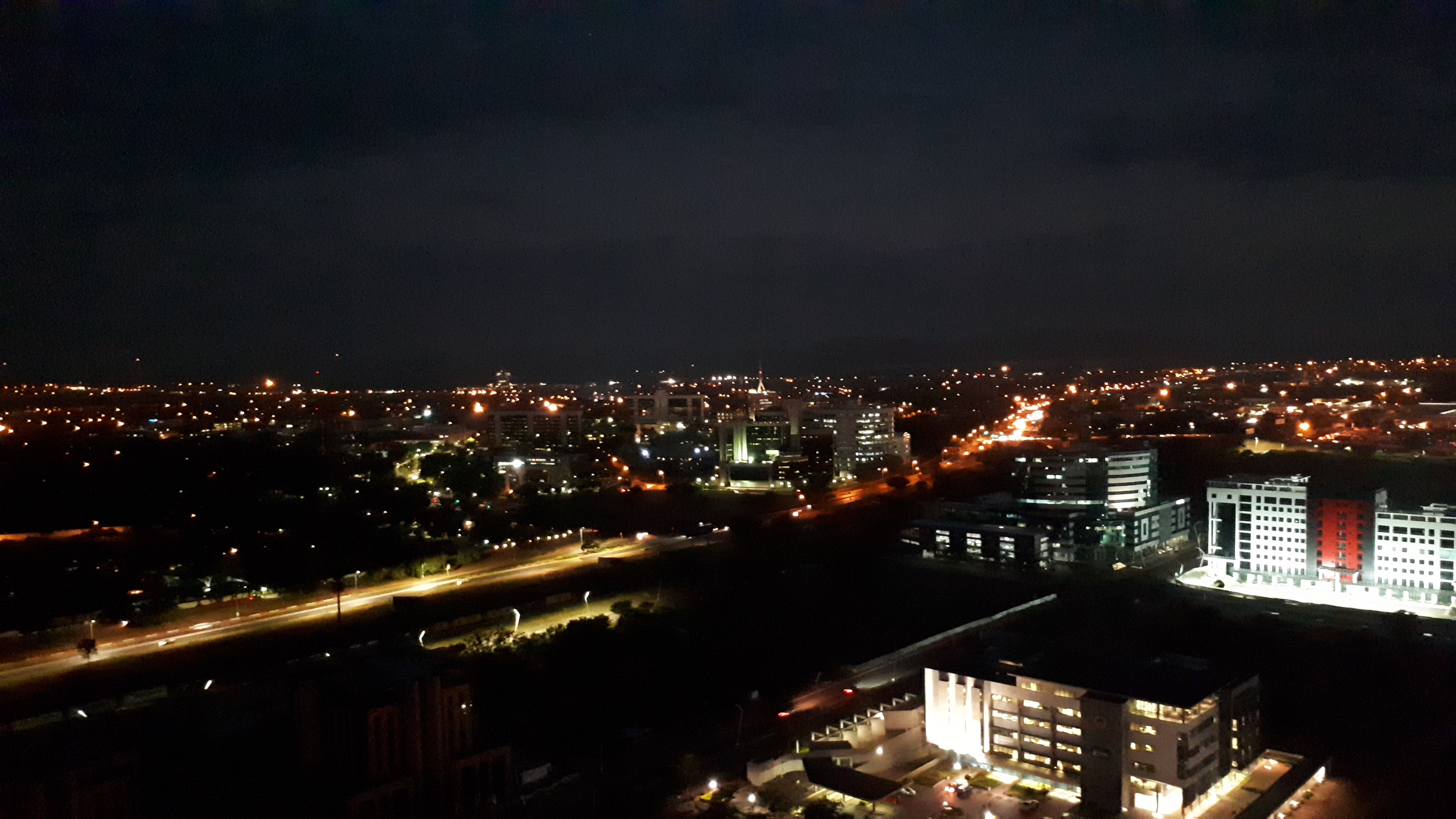
New CBD

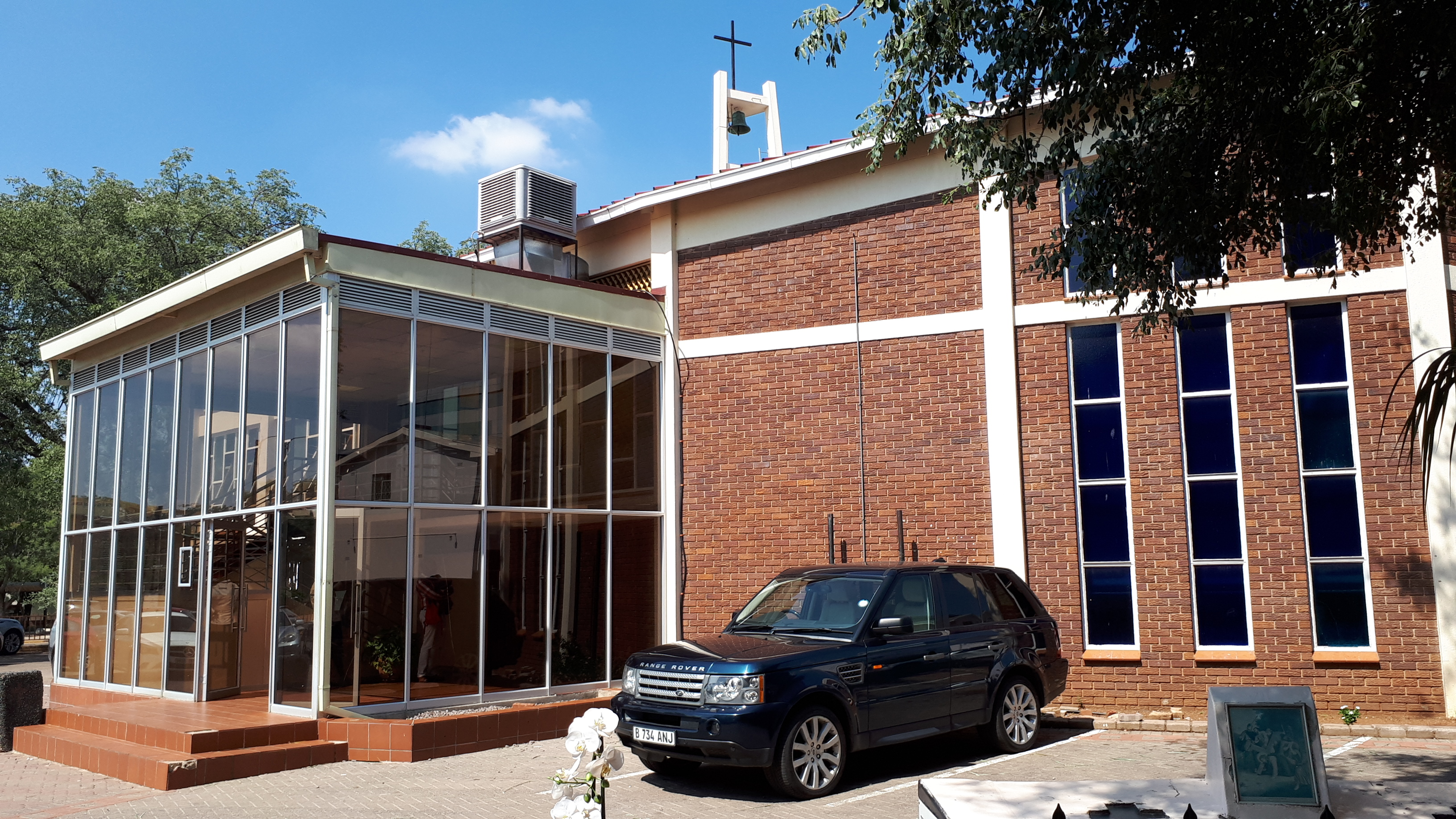
Christ The King Cathedral

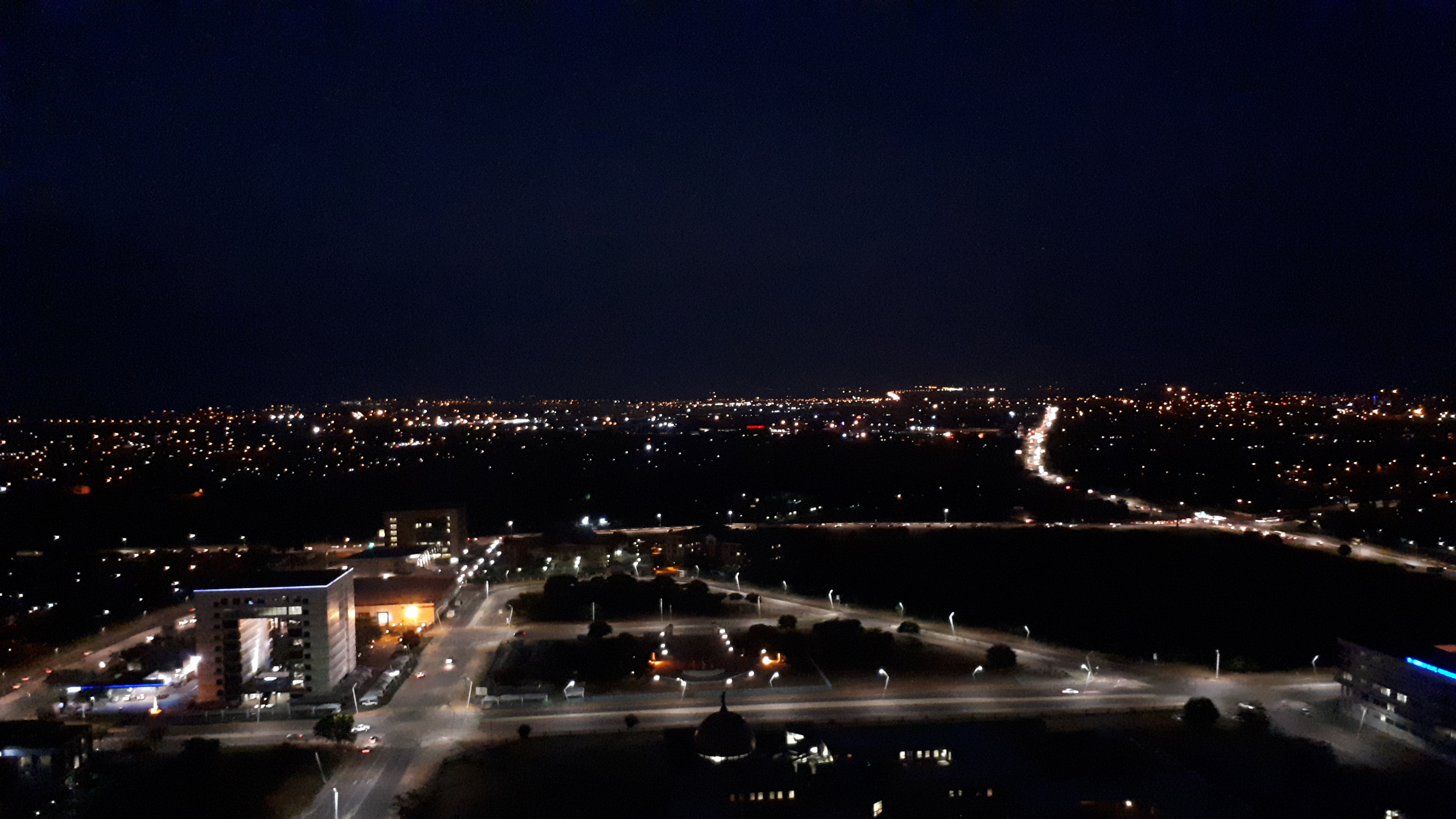
CBD Mall

SSKI Airport
