= Nnywane Dam =

- Location within Botswana
- Country: Botswana
- Location: South-East District
- Coordinates: 25.115399°S 25.689567°E
- Purpose: Urban water supply
- Opening date: 1970

Reservoir
- Total capacity: 2,300,000 cubic metres (81,000,000 cu ft)
- Catchment area: 238 square kilometres (92 sq mi)
- Surface area: 1.65 square kilometres (0.64 sq mi)

The Nnywane Dam is a dam on the Nnywane River in Botswana. The reservoir provides a water supply to Lobatse, a town 70 kilometres (43 mi) south of Gaborone. Water from the reservoir may also be transferred to Gaborone if needed.

== Construction ==
Nnywane Dam is the smallest of the reservoirs managed by the Water Utilities Corporation. The dam was built in 1970 with an earthcore fill structure. It has a catchment area of 238 square kilometres (92 sq mi). The surface area of the reservoir is 1.65 square kilometres (0.64 sq mi). The reservoir has a capacity of 2,300,000 cubic metres (81,000,000 cu ft). It is fed by the ephemeral Nnywane River, which runs only in the rainy season. Below the dam the Nnywane flows into the Ngotwane River, which flows into Ngotwane Dam in South Africa. The Ngotwane then forms the border between Botswana and South Africa before flowing into the Gaborone Dam.

== Supply fluctuations ==
Due to the hot, dry climate, about 2.3% of the stored water in Nnywane Dam is lost through evaporation in a typical year. Rainfall is unreliable. The 1978–79 rainy season was the start of a dry spell. The reservoir was depleted in 1982 and the public water supply forced to shift to pumping groundwater. Between 1998 and 2008 the percentage of the reservoir's capacity that was filled ranged from 39.1% in 2003 to 100% in 2006. In June 2012, during an exceptionally dry winter, the dam fell to 52% capacity fill.
