= Marico River =

River in South Africa and Botswana

Marico River Sotho: Madikwa
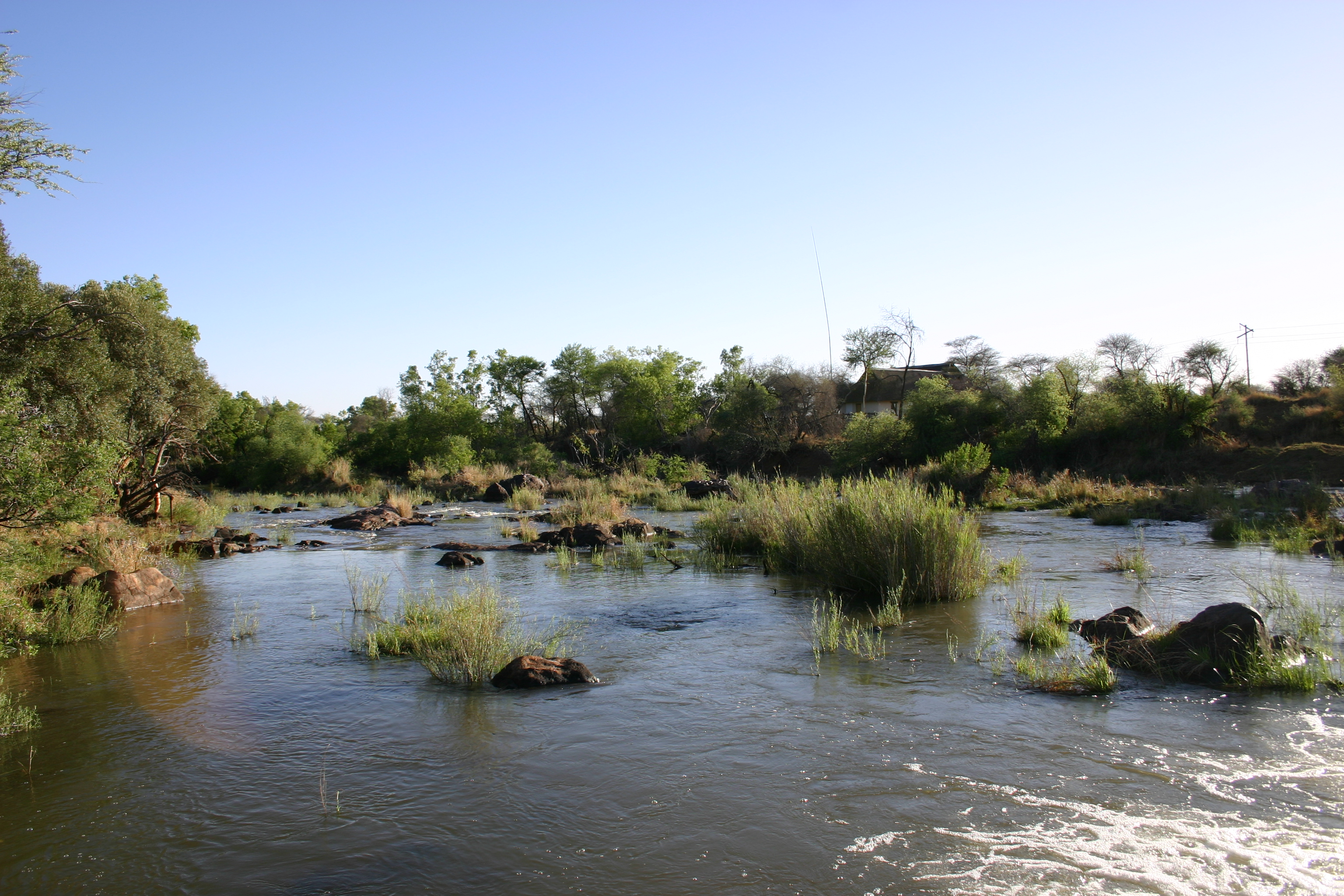
- Madikwe Game Reserve

- Location of the Marico River's mouth
- Etymology: From the Bahurutse Madikwa, meaning "there is blood".

Location
- Country: South Africa, Botswana
- Region: North West Province, Limpopo Province

Physical characteristics
- Source: Marico Oog
  - location: Ngaka Modiri, South Africa
  - coordinates: 25°47′19″S 26°21′57″E
  - elevation: 1,482 m (4,862 ft)
- Mouth: Limpopo River
  - location: near Oliphants Drift, South Africa/Botswana border
  - coordinates: 24°11′27″S 26°52′22″E
  - elevation: 872 m (2,861 ft)
- Length: 282 km (175 mi)
- Basin size: 13,208 km^{2} (5,100 sq mi)

Basin features
- Progression: Limpopo River → Indian Ocean

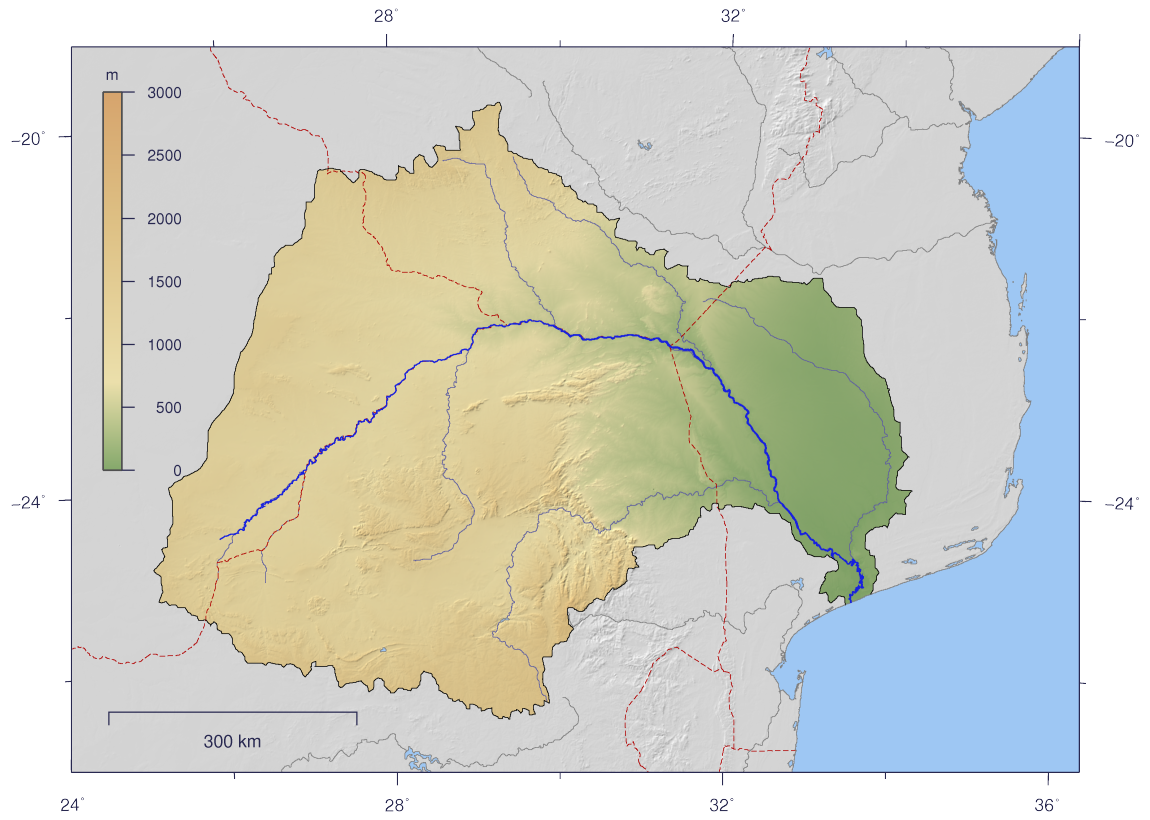
Course and Watershed of the Limpopo River

The Marico River or Madikwe is a river in Southern Africa. There are a number of dams in its basin. Groot Marico town is named after the Marico River. After it is joined on its right bank by the Crocodile River it is known as the Limpopo River.

== Course ==
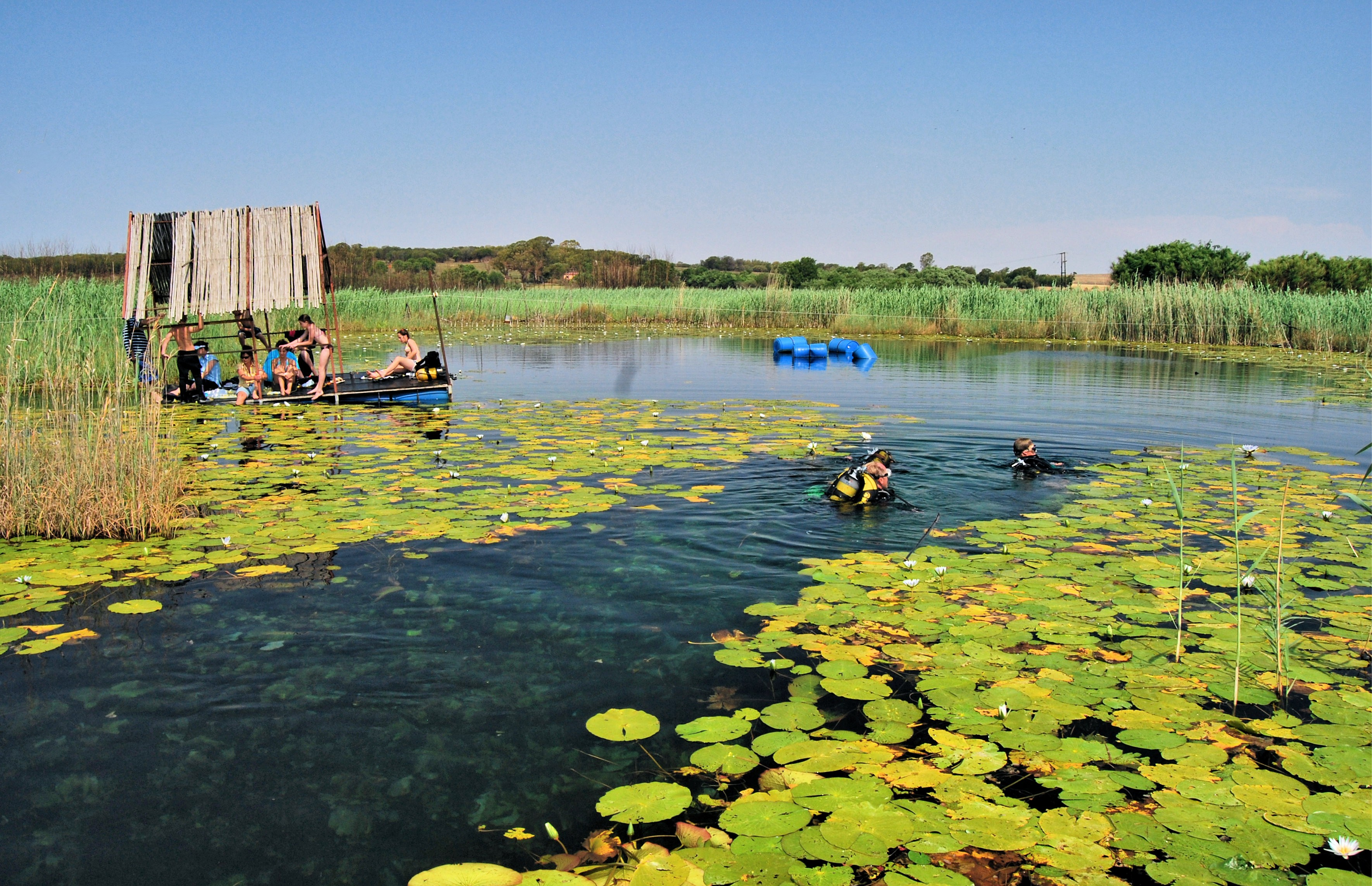
Eye of Marico, the source of the Marico River

The river starts off as the Groot Marico River in the Marico Oog (Eye of Marico in Afrikaans), near Rustenburg and Swartruggens in the North West Province of South Africa. The source of the river is a large dolomitic hole in the ground with clear water, which is also a spectacular scuba diving spot. It flows northwards as the Great Marico (Groot Marico) and further downstream the smaller Klein Marico River joins forces. For a stretch it is named Madikwene River, but after the Sehubyane River (Sandsloot) joins its left bank, it reverts to the name Marico.

It continues flowing northwards, bending northeastwards and forming the border between South Africa and Botswana. Further downstream the Crocodile River joins the Marico River from the right and the name of the stream after the confluence becomes the Limpopo River. About 5 km short of the confluence the Notwane River joins the Limpopo from the southwest.

== Dams in the river basin ==
The Marico River is part of the Crocodile (West) and Marico Water Management Area. Dams in the river basin are:

- Molatedi Dam
- Kromellenboog Dam
- Marico-Bosveld Dam
- Uitkyk Dam
- Klein-Maricopoort Dam
- Sehujwane Dam
- Madikwe Dam

== See also ==
- Drainage basin A
- List of rivers of South Africa
- Marico barb
