= Hout River =

- Location of the Hout River's mouth

Location
- Country: South Africa
- Region: Limpopo Province

Physical characteristics
- Source: Waterberg
  - location: near Ga-Mashashane
- Mouth: Sand River (Polokwane)
  - location: near Waterpoort Gorge, Limpopo Province
  - coordinates: 23°4′2″S 29°34′45″E
  - elevation: 844 m (2,769 ft)
- Length: 170 km (110 mi)

Basin features
- Tributaries
  - left: Mogwatsane
  - right: Brakspruit

The Hout River (Afrikaans: Houtrivier) is a river located in northern Limpopo Province, South Africa. It is a left hand tributary of the Sand River (Polokwane).

== Course ==
The Hout River starts on the eastern side of the Waterberg and flows in a NNE direction. Its course is dammed at the Mathala Dam, also known as Houtrivier Dam, the only significant dam in the whole Sand River basin. It continues flowing NNE until it reaches the southern flank of the Soutpansberg when it bends towards the ENE at the feet of the mountains right before meeting the left bank of the Sand River not far from the Waterpoort gorge.

During floods in the year 2000, this river carried away part of the tar road on the western side of a Hout River Bridge, leaving farmers in the area stranded for months.

== See also ==
- Drainage basin A
- List of rivers of South Africa
