= Madikwe Game Reserve =

Game reserve in South Africa

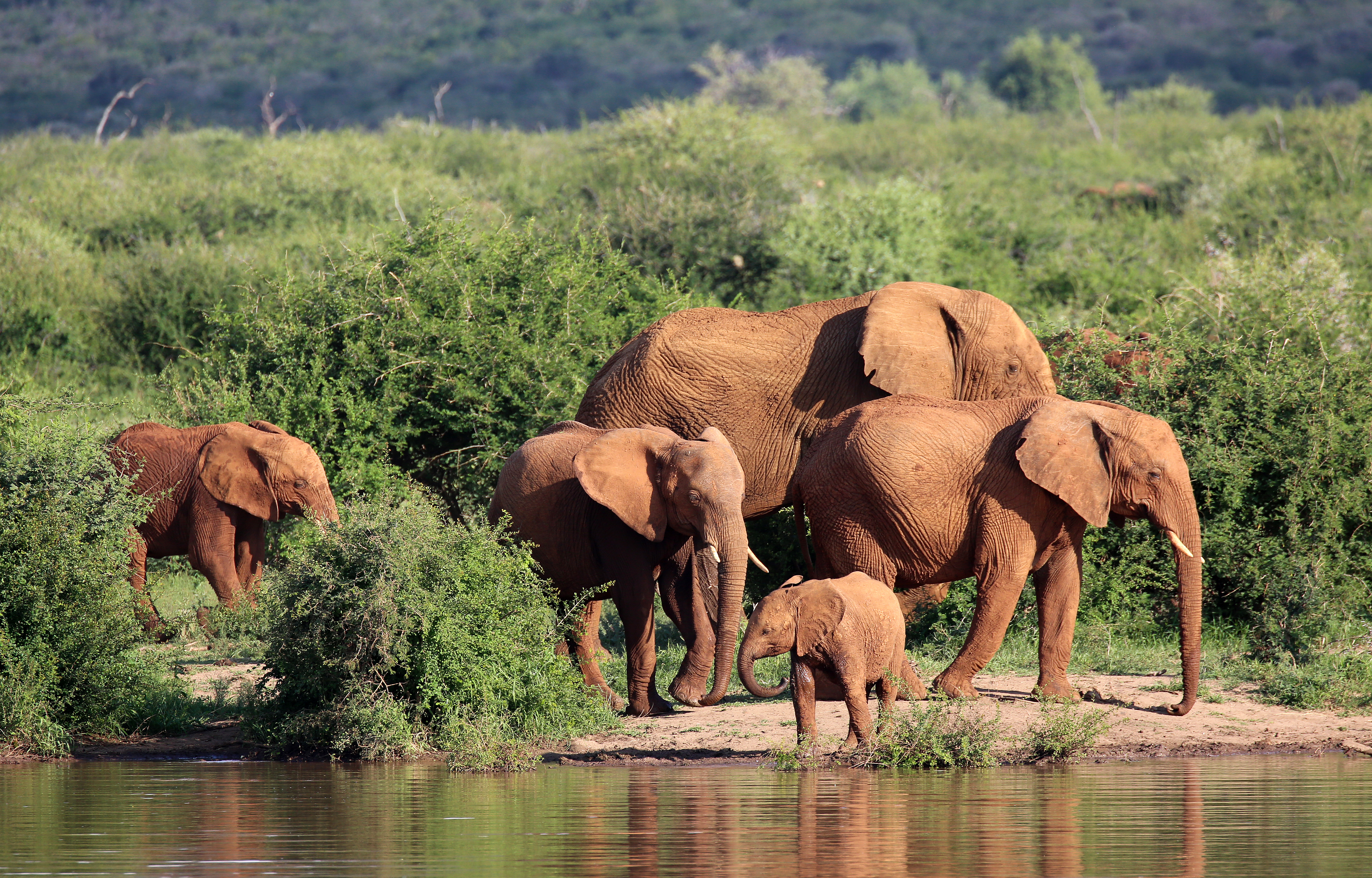
- A group of African bush elephants in Madikwe Game Reserve
- Location in North West province
- Location: North West Province, South Africa
- Nearest city: Zeerust
- Coordinates: 24°49′S 26°13′E
- Area: 750 km^{2} (290 sq mi)
- Established: 1994; 32 years ago
- Website: www.experiencemadikwe.com
- Madikwe Game Reserve (North West (South African province)) Madikwe Game Reserve (South Africa)

Madikwe Game Reserve is a protected area in South Africa and was named after the Madikwe or Marico River, on whose basin it is located. It comprises 750 km^{2} (290 sq mi) of bushland north of the small town of Groot-Marico up to the border with Botswana. It was opened in 1994.

== Geography ==
Madikwe Game Reserve is currently the fifth largest game reserve in South Africa encompassing 750 km^{2} (290 sq mi), including the now incorporated privately owned land. The area used to be farmland, but economists found that turning the area into a reserve would provide more jobs than farming, economically uplifting an otherwise poor area.

== Wildlife ==
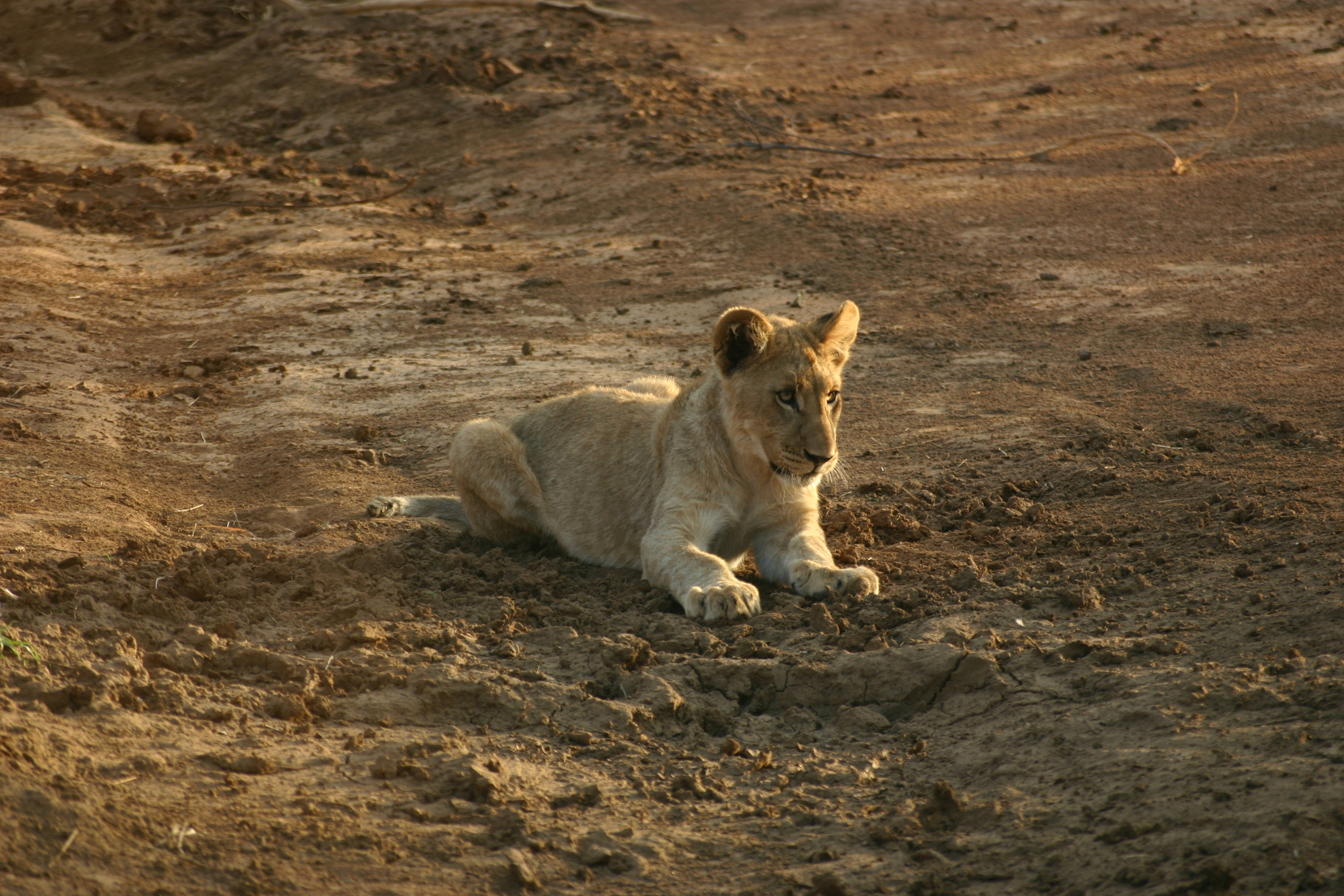
A lion cub

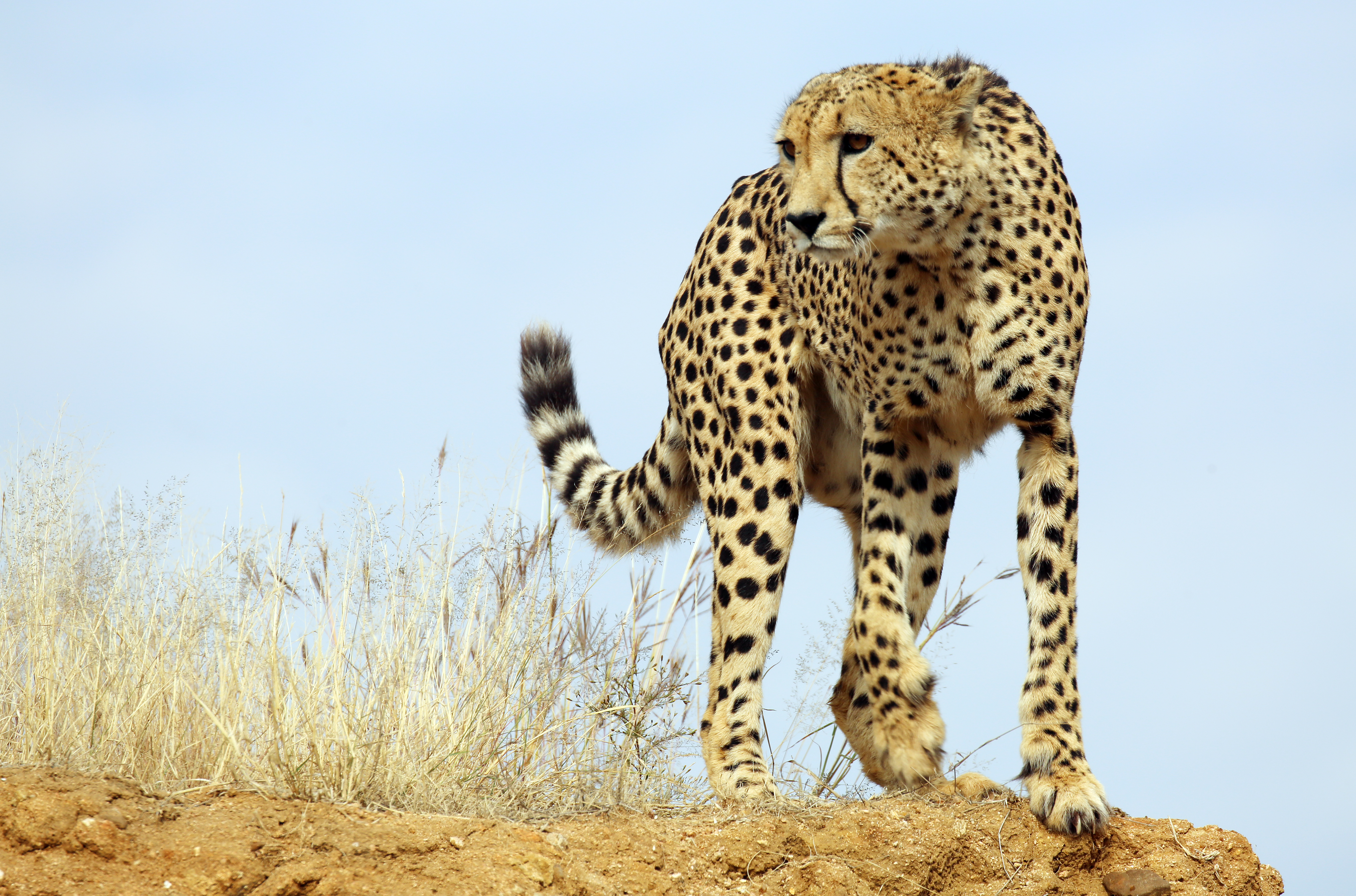
A cheetah in Madikwe Game Reserve

The process of reintroducing wildlife to the area began in 1992 under the codename Operation Phoenix which relocated entire breeding herds of the African bush elephant, African buffalo as well as south-central black rhinoceros and southern white rhinoceros along with various species of antelopes. Following Operation Phoenix, Madikwe also successfully reintroduced predatory species such as lion, cheetah, spotted hyena and African wild dog so that more than 60 mammal species occur in the game reserve. The elephant population, which grew from 220 in the 1990s to over 1,600 in 2025, is said to be far above the reserve's carrying capacity.

=== Vegetation ===
The terrain is mainly open grasslands and bushveld plains, interspersed with rocky outcrops and single mountains.

== Climate and weather ==
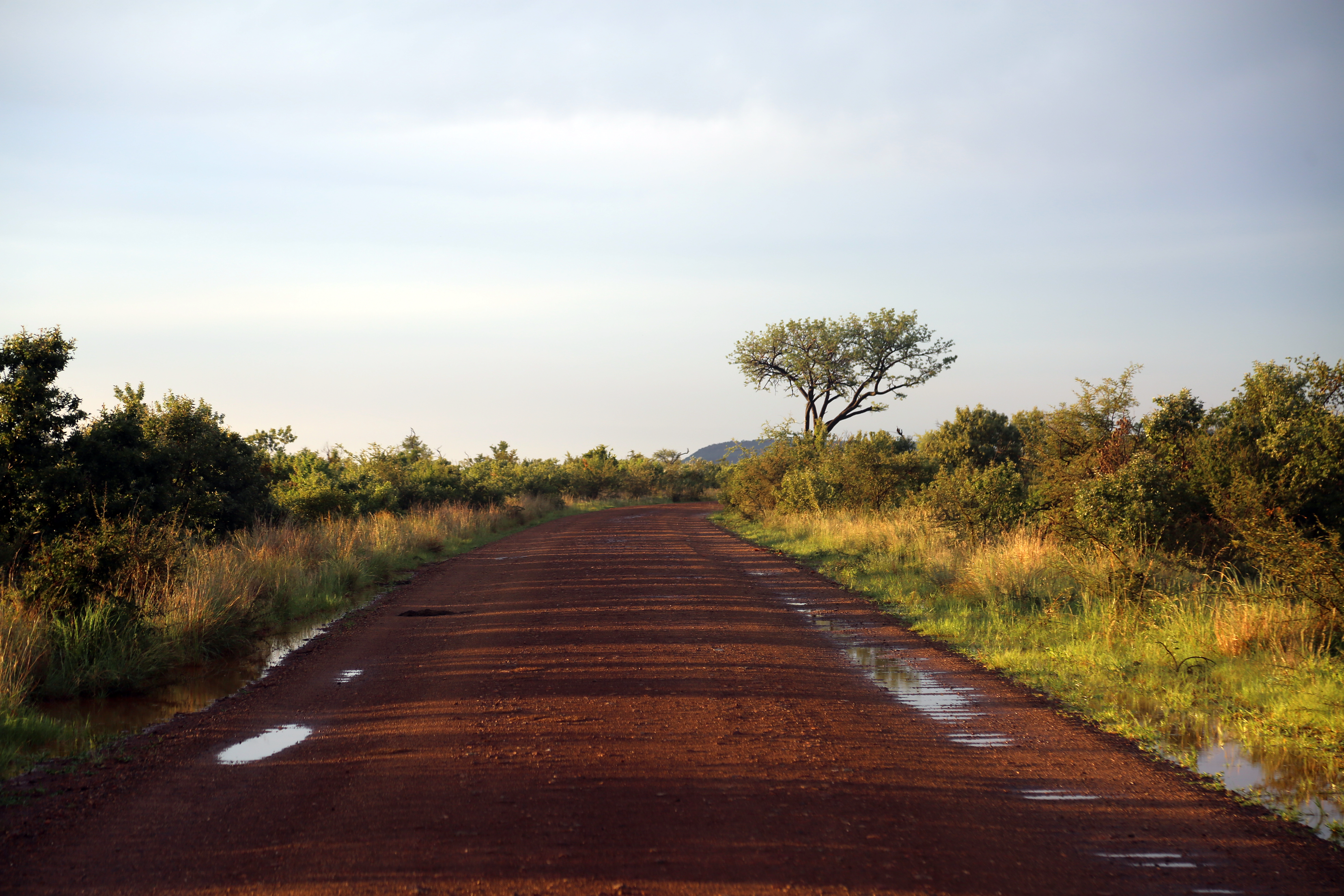

Madikwe forms part of a semi-arid region on the edge of the Kalahari desert. In this region the climate can be broken into the rainy season (October – April) and the dry season (May – September). Summers overlap with the rainy season. Temperatures are high (32 °C / 90 °F) with cooling thunderstorms common in the late afternoon, evenings are mild (18 °C / 64 °F). Winters here are dry, with mild days (21 °C / 70 °F) and chilly nights (3 °C / 37 °F). Game viewing is good at all times of the year though most animals tend to congregate around available water sources during the winter.
