= Brak River =

- Location of the Brak River's mouth

Location
- Country: South Africa
- Province: Limpopo

Physical characteristics
- Source
  - location: Makgabeng Plateau
- Mouth: Sand River (Polokwane)
  - location: Limpopo Province
  - coordinates: 22°36′15″S 29°44′0″E
  - elevation: 612 m (2,008 ft)
- Length: 170 km (110 mi)

Basin features
- Tributaries
  - left: Ga-Mamasonya, Boshela

The Brak River (Afrikaans: Brakrivier) is a river located in northern Limpopo Province, South Africa. It is a tributary of the Polokwane River.

== Course ==
The Brak River starts on the east of the Makgabeng Plateau and flows north-northeast until reaching the Blouberg, skirting the massif and flowing diagonally northeastwards between the Blouberg and the Soutpansberg. Then it meanders through the Lowveld until it joins the left bank of the Sand River about 45 kilometres (28 mi) to the southwest of Musina. The Brak River is an intermittent stream.

This river should not be confused with the Great Brak River of the Western Cape.

== See also ==
- Drainage basin A
- List of rivers of South Africa
