= Serorome River =

Location
- Country: Botswana

Physical characteristics
- Mouth
  - location: Limpopo River

Location of the mouth of the Metsimotlhabe River on the Limpopo River 23.564066°S 27.130639°E

The Serorome River is a river in the Central District of Botswana, a tributary of the Limpopo River.

== Geology ==
At one time the western Kalahari Region was a large, shallow inland lake, draining into the Limpopo through the Serorome Valley. Later geological upheavals re-oriented the rivers in the region to mainly flow northeast into the Zambezi. The Serorome valley is the exception, still leading to the Limpopo via a rift fault.

== Climate ==
Today the river flows through relatively flat, semi-arid country with savannah grasslands, shrubs and trees. The river flows occasionally in the rainy season, which lasts from November to April, and for the remainder of the year it is dry. It flows below its confluence with the Bonwapitse River due to run off in the Bonwapitse catchment. David Livingstone visited the region in 1857, and described the Serorome as "... a lovely spot in the otherwise dry region. The wells from which we had to lift out water for our cattle are deep, but they were well filled."

== Economic activity ==
The North-South Carrier pipeline crosses the Serorome valley, where there is a pumping station at 227 kilometres (141 mi) from the Letsibogo Dam. The Mmamabula coal field lies to the south of the river.
