= Marico-Bosveld Dam =

- Interactive map of Marico-Bosveld Dam
- Official name: Marico-Bosveld Dam
- Country: South Africa
- Location: North West
- Coordinates: 25°28′5″S 26°23′0″E
- Purpose: Irrigation
- Opening date: 1933
- Owner: Department of Water Affairs

Dam and spillways
- Type of dam: Homogeneous earth-fill
- Impounds: Marico River
- Height: 27 metres (89 ft)
- Length: 1,695 metres (5,561 ft)

Reservoir
- Creates: Marico-Bosveld Dam Reservoir
- Total capacity: 27,813,000 cubic metres (982,200,000 cu ft)
- Catchment area: 1228 km^{2}
- Surface area: 430.7 hectares (1,064 acres)

Marico-Bosveld Dam is a homogeneous earth-fill type dam located on the Marico River, near Groot Marico, North West, South Africa. The dam was established in 1933 and serves mainly for irrigation purposes. The hazard potential of the dam has been ranked high (3).

The dam was built during the Great Depression of 1933. 75% of the labour was white and 25% was black. The main engineer on the project was Timothy d’Oliveira. The dam was built to provide work and income to people at the time.

== See also ==
- List of reservoirs and dams in South Africa
- List of rivers of South Africa
