= WUC =

WUC may refer to:

- Water Utilities Corporation (Botswana), a government-owned corporation that provides water and waste water management services in Botswana.
- World Universities Congress 2010
- World Uyghur Congress
- WWE Universal Championship
