= Drainage basin A =

One of the drainage basins of South Africa

Drainage Basin A, is one of the drainage basins of South Africa. The main river in this system is the Limpopo River. It is subdivided into 9 sub-drainage basins.

- A1 is situated along the Botswana border, and is again divided into 3 river basins
  - A10A covers the Ngotwane River up to and including the Ngotwane Dam
  - A10B covers the Notwane River up to the border with Botswana and it joins the Taung River in Botswana, just before it drains into the Gaborone Dam
  - A10C covers the Segakwane River before it crosses the border with Botswana.
- A2 has the Marico River as main river system.
  - A21A covers the Hennops River and Rietvlei River up to and including the Rietvlei Dam
- A3 has the Crocodile River as main river system and divided into 11 river basins. Situated off northwest Gauteng and Limpopo province.
  - A31A
  - A32A
  - A32B
  - A32C covers the Brakfonteinspruit until it drains into the Molatedi Dam, as well as a short section of the Raswue River, before it crosses the border with Botswana.
- A4 has the Mokolo River as main river system. Includes the Matlabas River, a smaller tributary of the Limpopo.
- A5 has the Lephalala River as main river system.
- A6 has the Mogalakwena River as main river system.
- A7 has the Sand River (Polokwane) as main river system.
- A8 has the Nzhelele River as main river system. Includes the Nwanedi River
- A9 has the Luvuvhu River as main river system.
