= Sand River (Limpopo) =

Sand River Sandrivier
- Location of the Sand River mouth
- Etymology: Polokwane meaning "place of safety" in the Northern Sotho language.
- Native name: Polokwane (Northern Sotho)

Location
- Country: South Africa
- State: Mpumalanga and Limpopo provinces
- City: Polokwane

Physical characteristics
- Source
  - location: Yserberg
  - elevation: 2,039 m (6,690 ft)
- Mouth: Limpopo River
  - location: near Musina
  - coordinates: 22°18′50″S 30°7′41″E
  - elevation: 418 m (1,371 ft)
- Length: 350 km (220 mi)
- Basin size: 15,630 km^{2} (6,030 sq mi)

Basin features
- Tributaries
  - left: Mulaudzi (Blood), Hout, Moleletsane, Brak
  - right: Diep, Koperspruit, Dwars

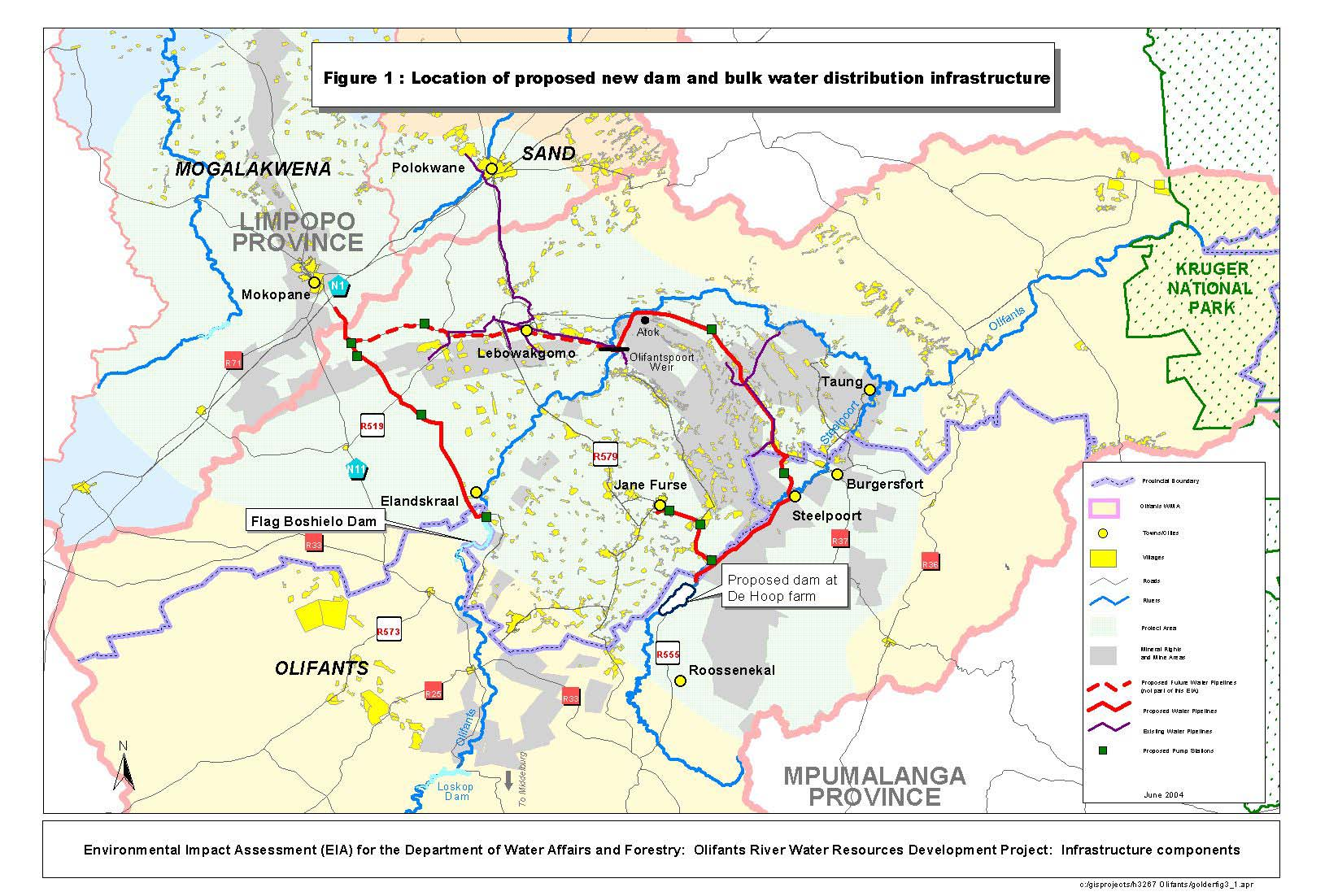
A diagram of potential construction of a Dam on the De Hoop river

The Sand River or Polokwane River (Afrikaans: Sandrivier) is a watercourse in Limpopo Province, South Africa, a right hand tributary of the Limpopo River. Its new name "Polokwane River" is homonymous with the name of the town of Polokwane, formerly Pietersburg, about 200 kilometres (120 mi) upriver from its mouth. The Sand River flows by the western edge of this town.

== Course ==
It has its source south of Mokopane and flows northwards across central Limpopo Province until it cuts across the Soutpansberg through a deep gorge, the Waterpoort. Then it meanders northwards across the Lowveld until it joins the right bank of the Limpopo 7 kilometres (4 mi) east of Musina. Although considered a perennial stream it is often dry in the winter.

The veld in the Sand River basin has suffered much degradation, mainly due to overgrazing. There are some wetland zones in the basin. These areas are an important ecosystem for certain rare or endangered plants, as well as frog and bird species. There are 18 mines in the Sand River basin.

=== Dams and tributaries ===
The only relatively large dam in the Sand River basin is the Mathala Dam, also known as Houtrivier Dam, on the Hout River, a left hand tributary of the Sand. The Diep River meets the right bank of the Sand River northeast of Polokwane town. The Mulaudzi River, also known as "Blood River", joins the Sand River from the left just north of Polokwane. The Seshego Dam is a small dam on the Mulaudzi. The Brak River is an intermittent stream flowing between the Blouberg and the Soutpansberg, joining the left bank of the Sand River about 35 kilometres (22 mi) from the Limpopo River.

== See also ==
- Drainage basin A
- List of rivers of South Africa
