= Diep River (Limpopo) =

- Location of the Diep River's mouth
- Etymology: Afrikaans for 'deep river'

Location
- Country: South Africa
- Province: Limpopo

Physical characteristics
- Source
  - location: SSE of Polokwane
  - elevation: 1,450 m (4,760 ft)
- Mouth: Sand River (Polokwane)
  - location: Limpopo Province
  - coordinates: 23°41′23″S 29°35′46″E
  - elevation: 1,116 m (3,661 ft)

Basin features
- Tributaries
  - right: Turfloop

The Diep River is a river located in northern Limpopo Province, South Africa. It is a tributary of the Sand River (Polokwane).

The Diep is a seasonal river that originates about 12 km SSE of Polokwane and flows roughly northwards until it joins the Sand River, just 22 km northeast of the same town. The confluence is located right after the Turfloop River, its only significant tributary, joins its right bank.

== See also ==
- List of rivers of South Africa
