= Notwane River =

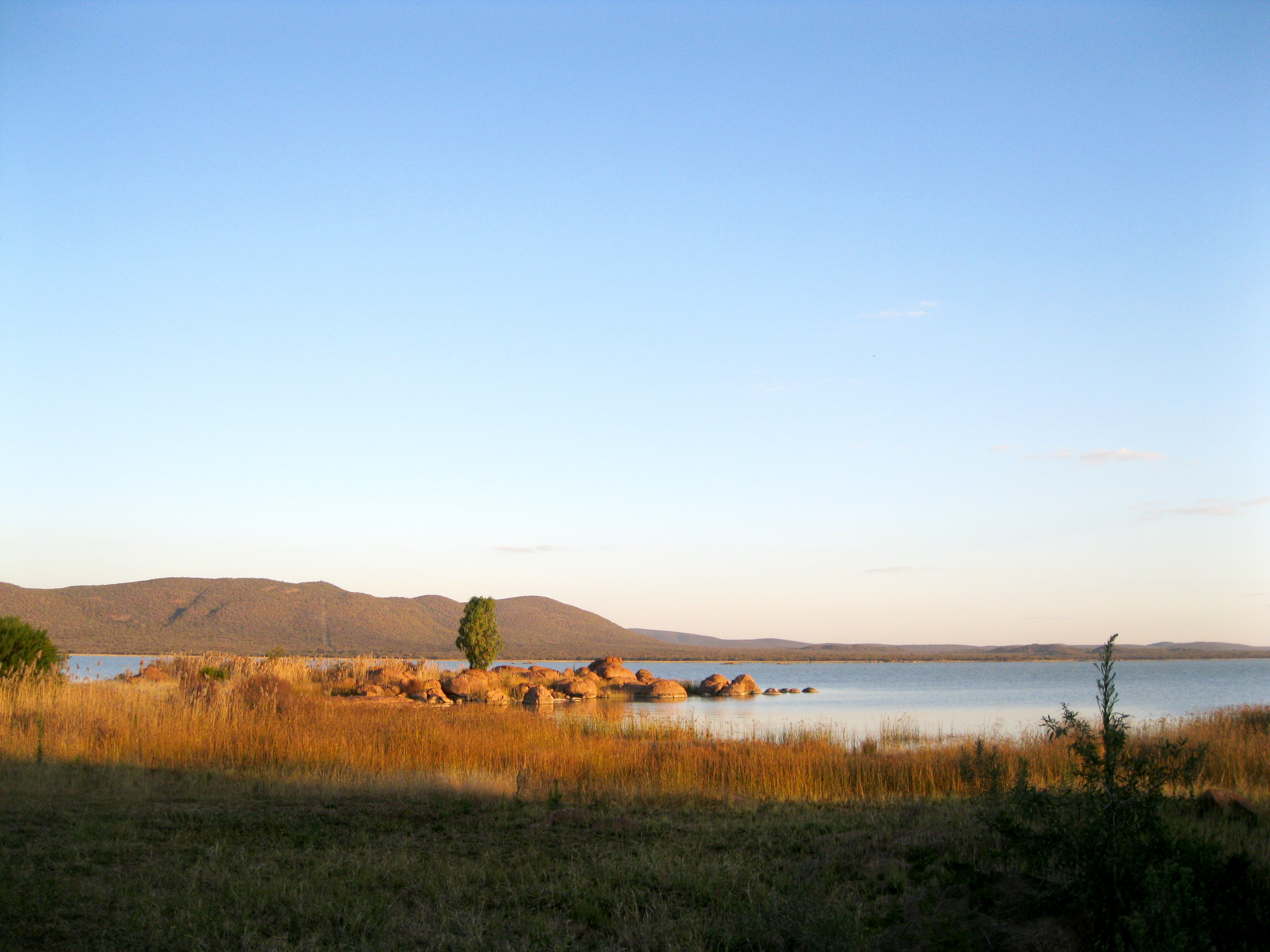
- View of Gaborone Dam in the Notwane River

- Location of the Notwane River mouth

Location
- Country: Botswana

Physical characteristics
- Source: Kalahari
- Mouth: Pala Camp
  - location: Limpopo River, South Africa/Botswana border
  - coordinates: 23°44′56″S 26°57′37″E
  - elevation: 847 m (2,779 ft)
- Basin size: 18,053 km^{2} (6,970 sq mi)

The Notwane River (or Ngotwane River) is a river in southeastern Botswana. Certain sections of its course form the international boundary with South Africa. Its mouth is at the head of the Limpopo River. It has a catchment area of 18,053 square kilometres (6,970 sq mi).

== Course ==
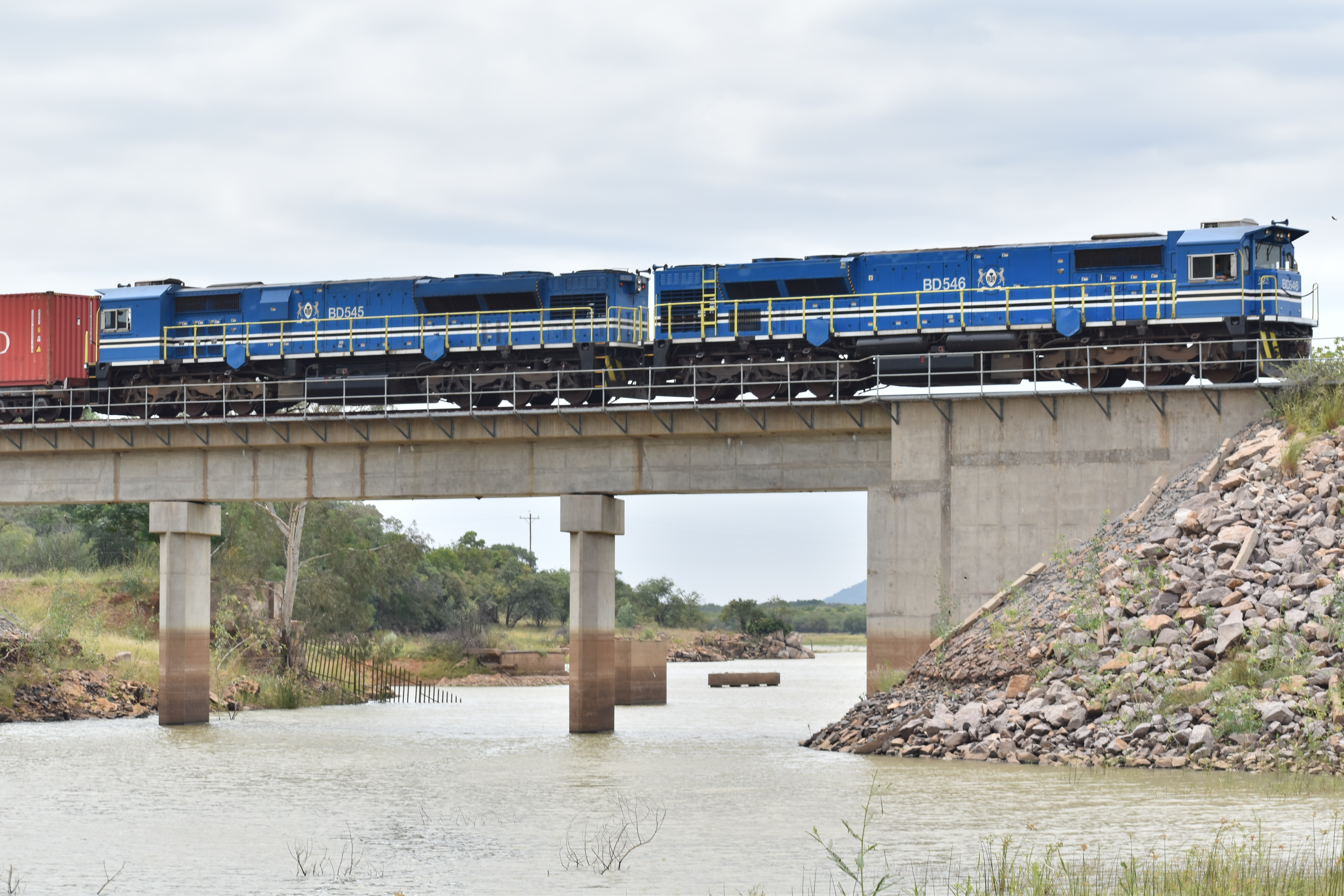
Train crossing bridge over Notwane River

The Notwane rises about 11 kilometres (6.8 mi) south of Ramotswa, and runs along the border in a northeast direction to enter the Limpopo at the same longitude as Mahalapye. The Notwane has its source in the sandveld, at the eastern fringes of the Kalahari Desert. It flows roughly northeastwards past the most densely populated area of Botswana, passing east of Lobatse, between the city of Gaborone and Tlokweng village and then through Mochudi village. Finally it joins the left bank of the Limpopo River at the border with South Africa, just 6 km short of the confluence of the Limpopo with the Matlabas River.

The Notwane basin is drained by the Notwane itself and its tributaries the Taung, Segoditshane, Metsimotlhabe, Metsemaswaane and Nywane. Its main tributaries are the Taung, Peleng, Metsimotlhabe and Nywane rivers. All the rivers in the Notwane basin are ephemeral experiencing mostly brief, seasonal flow depending from the rainfall. The Notwane and Taung riverbeds are dry during the dry season and in years of drought they may be completely dry the whole year round. All these rivers may cause flash floods.

== History ==
The banks of the Notwane River have been occupied since the middle Stone Age. The first modern settlement was Moshaweng, which was established by Chief Gaborone of the Tlokwa in the late 1880s, near the site of the modern capital. The city of Gaborone, an expansion of the earlier settlement, was developed on the Notwane River in the 1960s in part due to proximity to the railway, in part due to availability of water provided by the river.

== Dams ==
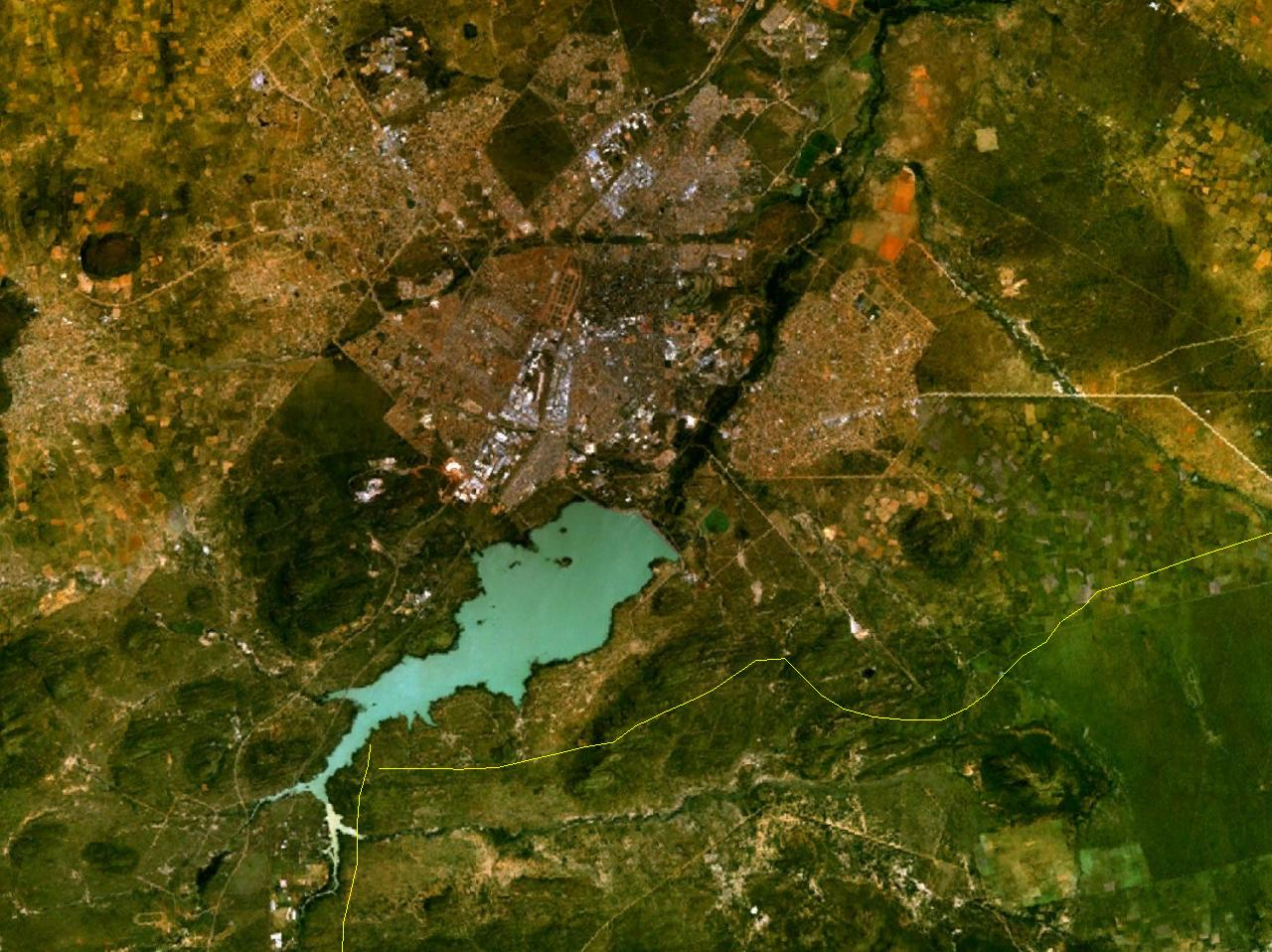
NASA picture of the Notwane River with the Gaborone Dam

The Gaborone Dam, which supplies water to the city of Gaborone, has a capacity of 144,000,000 cubic metres (5.1×10^{9} cu ft). Further upstream, the Ngotwane Dam in Lehurutshe, South Africa has a capacity of 18,000,000 cubic metres (640,000,000 cu ft). In the Gaborone dam catchment area there are many other dams, mostly very small, with only the Nnywane Dam near Lobatse being used for domestic water supply. Following a 1992 study on their impact on downstream water resources, a moratorium was placed on construction of small dams in the catchment area.

== Fauna and flora ==
Whilst the flow of the Notwane is ephemeral; biodiversity is the highest immediately upstream of the Gaborone Dam, north of the confluence with the Taung river. The riverbed in this area generally retains small pools of water, even during prolonged dry periods.

The African sharptooth catfish, locally known as barbel, are the most common fish species in these waters. The river also supports smaller populations of bream, tilapia and introduced carp.

Birdlife proliferates as one gets nearer to the Gaborone Dam, this includes a number of heron and kingfisher species. African fish eagle are seen regularly, along with reed cormorant and african darter. Verreaux's eagle-owl do occur in the area and yellow-billed kite are common summer visitors. Southern yellow-billed hornbill, southern red-billed hornbill and natal spurfowl are often seen in the surrounding woodland.

Vervet monkey are common along the river course nearer the Gaborone Dam. Chacma baboon may also be encountered and antelope species such as kudu and impala are present, but rare. Lesser bushbaby nest in this area and black-backed jackal are heard occasionally in the evening. A small population of nile crocodile are resident in the lower courses of the river close to the Gaborone Dam. Both nile monitor and rock monitor do occur in the area, the former being seen more regularly. The riparian vegetation and surrounding woodland also provides suitable habitat for African rock python and mozambique spitting cobra.

The river course is dominated by syringa berrytree, water fig and white bauhinia. The syringa berrytree is an invasive species introduced from India. The riparian vegetation eventually gives way to acacia woodland. Buffalo thorn, paperback thorn and knobthorn are common to this woodland. Marula and weeping wattle also occur in the area.

== See also ==
- Drainage basin A
- Limpopo River
