= Bonwapitse River =

River in Central Botswana

Bonwapitse River Bonapitse, Bonapitsi, Bonwapitse
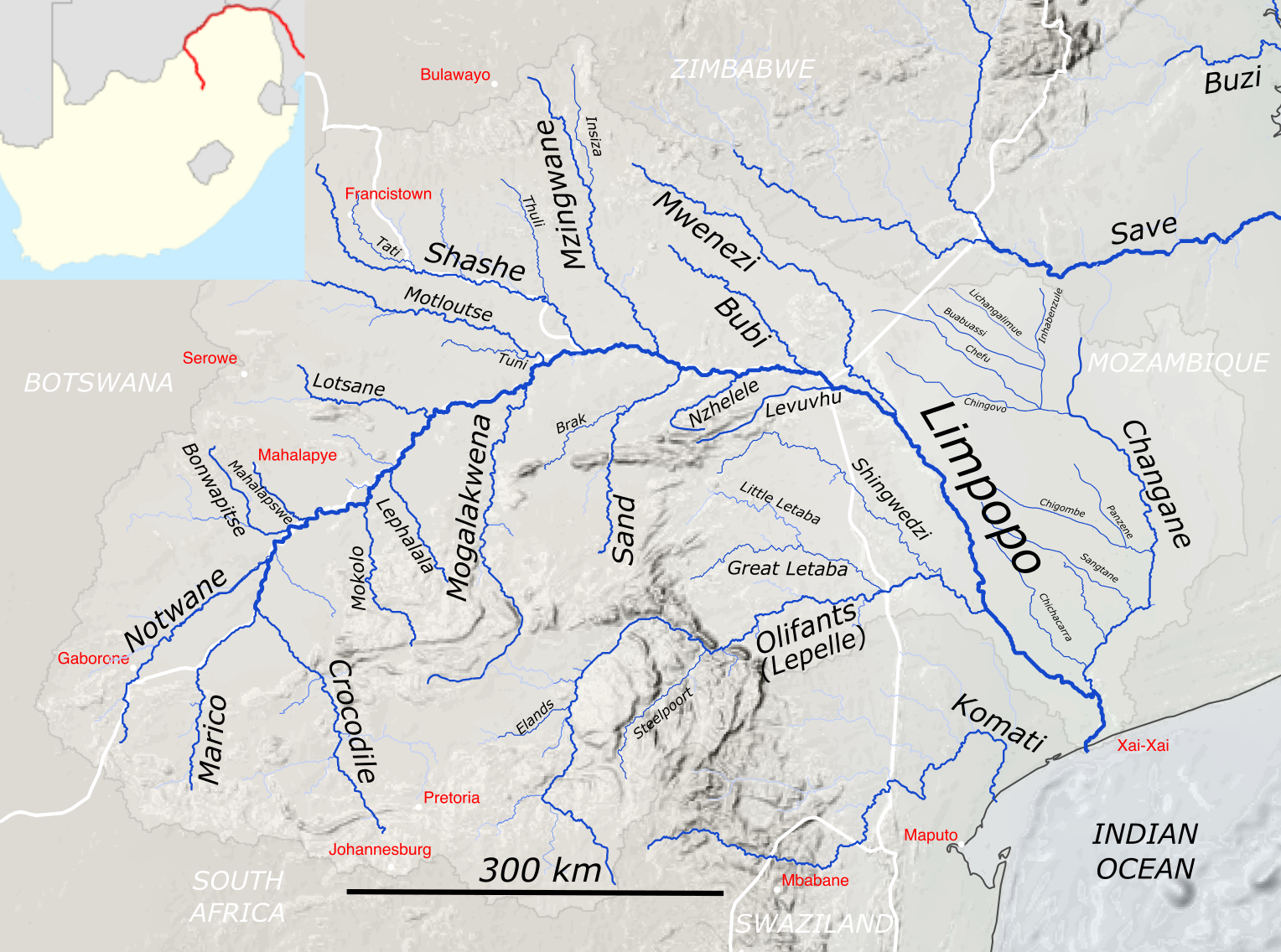
- The Bonwapitse in the Limpopo catchment area (center left)

Location
- Country: Botswana

Physical characteristics
- Mouth: Limpopo River
  - coordinates: 23°34′9.81″S 27°7′52.42″E

Bonwapitse is a river in Central Botswana. The river is estimated at 886 m (2,907 ft) above sea level, and has a total area of 1,202,985 ha. The name of the river exists in several forms: Bonapitse River, Bonapitsi, Bonwapitse. Today the river flows through relatively flat, semi-arid country with savannah grasslands, shrubs and trees. The river flows occasionally in the rainy season, which lasts from November to April, and for the remainder of the year it is dry. It flows below its confluence with the Serorome River.
