= Marico barb =

Marico Barb

Conservation status
- Near Threatened (IUCN 3.1)

Scientific classification
- Kingdom: Animalia
- Phylum: Chordata
- Class: Actinopterygii
- Division: Teleostei
- Order: Cypriniformes
- Family: Cyprinidae
- Subfamily: Smiliogastrinae
- Genus: Enteromius
- Species: E. motebensis

Binomial name
- Enteromius motebensis Steindachner, 1894

Synonyms
- Barbus motebensis

Species of fish

The Marico barb (Enteromius motebensis) is a species of ray-finned fish in the family Cyprinidae. It is named after the Marico River and found only in South Africa.
