= Water Utilities Corporation =

Government-owned corporation in Botswana

- Type: Governmental
- Predecessor: Department of Water Affairs
- Founded: 1970; 56 years ago
- Headquarters: Sedibeng House, Plot 17530, Luthuli Road, Gaborone, Botswana
- Revenue: ▼BWP1.8 billion (2020); P1.825 billion (2019)
- Total assets: ▲ P11 billion (2020); P9.7 billion (2019)
- Owner: Government of Botswana
- Number of employees: ▲3072 (2021); Unknown (2020)
- Website: www.wuc.bw

Water Utilities Corporation (WUC) is a government-owned corporation that provides water and waste water management services in Botswana. The Board is appointed by the Minister of Minerals, Energy and Water Resources. The water supply is critically important in the arid or semi-arid environment of Botswana.

== History ==
Water Utilities Corporation was established in 1970 by an Act of Parliament (Cap 74:02). During its establishment, it managed a single project: the supply and distribution of water in what was then called the Shashe Development Area. The Government of Botswana expanded this mandate to include planning, construction, operation, treatment, maintenance, and distribution of water resources in the country’s urban centres and other areas. It also involved the supply of bulk water to the then Department of Water Affairs and various Local Authorities for onward distribution to villages and settlements. Between 2009 and 2013, the water sector was restructured. The Corporation was given a new mandate to supply potable water to all urban centres and villages across the country and manage wastewater and sanitation services. These Water Sector Reforms (WSR) resulted from a study to rationalise the water sector in Botswana in order ensuring uniform service levels by the government.

== Policy framework ==
Botswana's water policy is based on the 1991 Botswana National Water Master Plan (NWMP), with recommendations for reform made in a 2006 review. The NWMP covers water resource monitoring and management, and water project feasibility studies and implementation. A Water Sector Reforms Project is being undertaken in 2008-2013. Within the terms of this project, the Water Resources Council advises the Minister of Minerals, Energy and Water Resources, monitors and allocates water resources between users, and develops policy for managing water resources. The Department of Water Affairs ensures that sufficient water is available from sustainable sources to meet the needs of the economy. The WUC is responsible for delivery of water and wastewater services country-wide. Local kgotla community meetings resolve water-related disputes.

== Operations ==
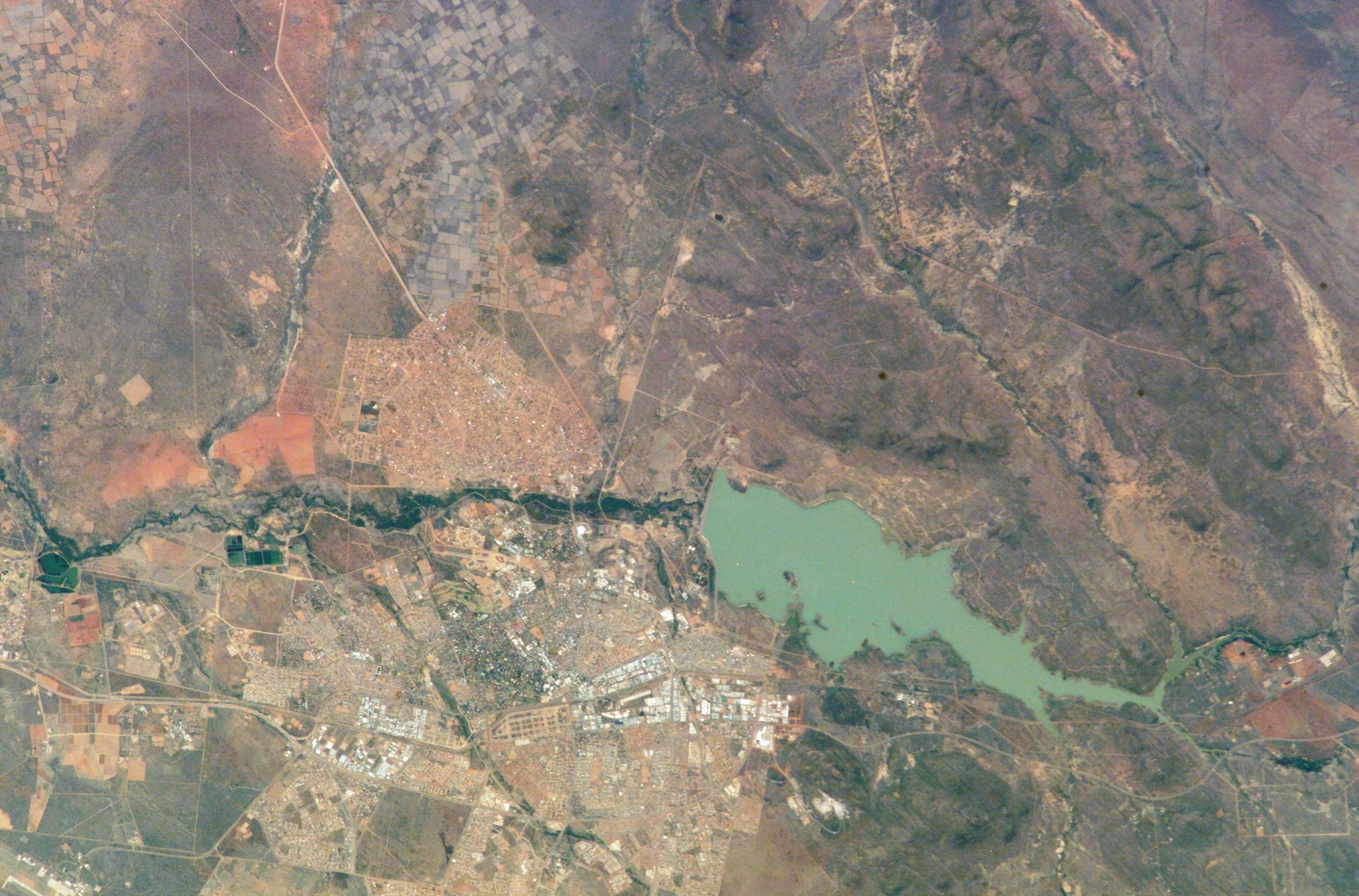
Gaborone from space. The Gaborone dam is the largest in the country.

The WUC was established in 1970 to manage a water supply and distribution project in the Shashe Development Area. Today the WUC provides water to the cities of Gaborone and Francistown and the towns of Lobatse, Jwaneng, Selebi-Phikwe and Sowa. The WUC is economically self-sufficient, raising enough revenue from billing and subsidies to cover operational costs, investments and debt servicing. When compared to other utilities in sub-Saharan Africa, the WUC is extremely efficient in revenue management.

The WUC is administratively divided into the South region based in Gaborone with Management Centers servicing Gaborone, Mochudi, Lobatse, Molepolole, Kanye, Gantsi and Tshabong; and the North region based in Francistown with Management Centers servicing Francistown, Mahalapye, Palapye, Serowe, Selebi Phikwe, Masunga, Maun and Kasane. In June 2007, the WUC opened a contact center with a toll-free number to handle customer inquiries.

The WUC's assets include the Gaborone, Nnywane, Bokaa, Shashe and Letsibogo dams, the 360 kilometres (220 mi) long North South Carrier Scheme pipeline, water treatment plants, pump stations and other equipment. Taken together, the dams have storage capacity of 346,900,000 cubic metres (1.225×10^{10} cu ft). The WUC also imports some water from the Molatedi Dam in South Africa. The reservoirs contain 90% of total capacity in Botswana. More water is lost from the reservoirs through evaporation than through consumption, and this is expected to increase due to global climate change.

The WUC supplies bulk treated water to the Department of Water Affairs. The Department of Water Affairs arranges distribution of this water and water from its own sources such as well fields to seventeen major villages. About half of the water delivered to the major villages comes from the WUC. District Councils supply water to more than 200 smaller villages. Some water users arrange their own supplies of water. As of 2012, there were plans to transfer responsibility for water supply from the Department of Water Affairs to WUC, and to transfer waste water management from the District Councils to the WUC.

== Issues ==
The NWMP is over twenty years old, and needs review. Transboundary water management is not covered by a formal policy framework in Botswana, although Botswana has ratified international agreements on management of transboundary rivers. Given the importance of transboundary river basins in the country, improvements to international coordination are urgently needed. Rainfall is unreliable in Botswana, and dry spells may last for several years. At the same time, growing prosperity is increasing demand for water to fill swimming pools, wash cars and water gardens. In 2004, there was a drought. Water in the Gaborone Dam fell to 27% of capacity, and the government was forced to impose and enforce extremely harsh restrictions on use of water.

The WUC charges are based on monthly usage and aim to recover production and transport costs. They are reduced by subsidies that favor rural users and low-volume users. There are perverse incentives in the WUC's economic model. The WUC earns money from selling water, so does not have an incentive to conserve the resource. Prices and subsidies are automatically set to cover costs, removing the incentive to contain cost and minimize leaks. Many of the WUC's main customers are government-funded, and can pass on their water costs to the taxpayer. Subsidies are expected to remain over 30% of cost until 2019. Coupled with use of inefficient private subcontractors for maintenance who get pay for work done rather than for results, the result is a highly uneconomic water supply.

Due to the scarcity of water, costs are rising while the government plans to reduce subsidies. Prices will therefore rise, which should help reduce demand. Subsidies will have to be adjusted to assist the most needy. Standpipes are the main source of water in low-income areas, and water from the standpipes is either free or covered by a flat monthly service rate, so there is no incentive for these users to curb their use of water. Other flaws in the rate structure also discourage the most efficient use of the scarce water resource. Starting in 1992, the WUC has been piping water to every city plot in Gaborone, taking responsibility for installation and for billing and collection charges. The Gaborone City Council (GCC) was providing free water via standpipes in Self Help Housing Areas, while paying the WUC for the water. In the late 2000s the GCC began removing the standpipes so as to reduce costs, causing serious problems for the many people who could not afford to pay the WUC for on-plot connections.

== Gallery of the World telecommunications and informations society day 2017 participation (WUC) ==
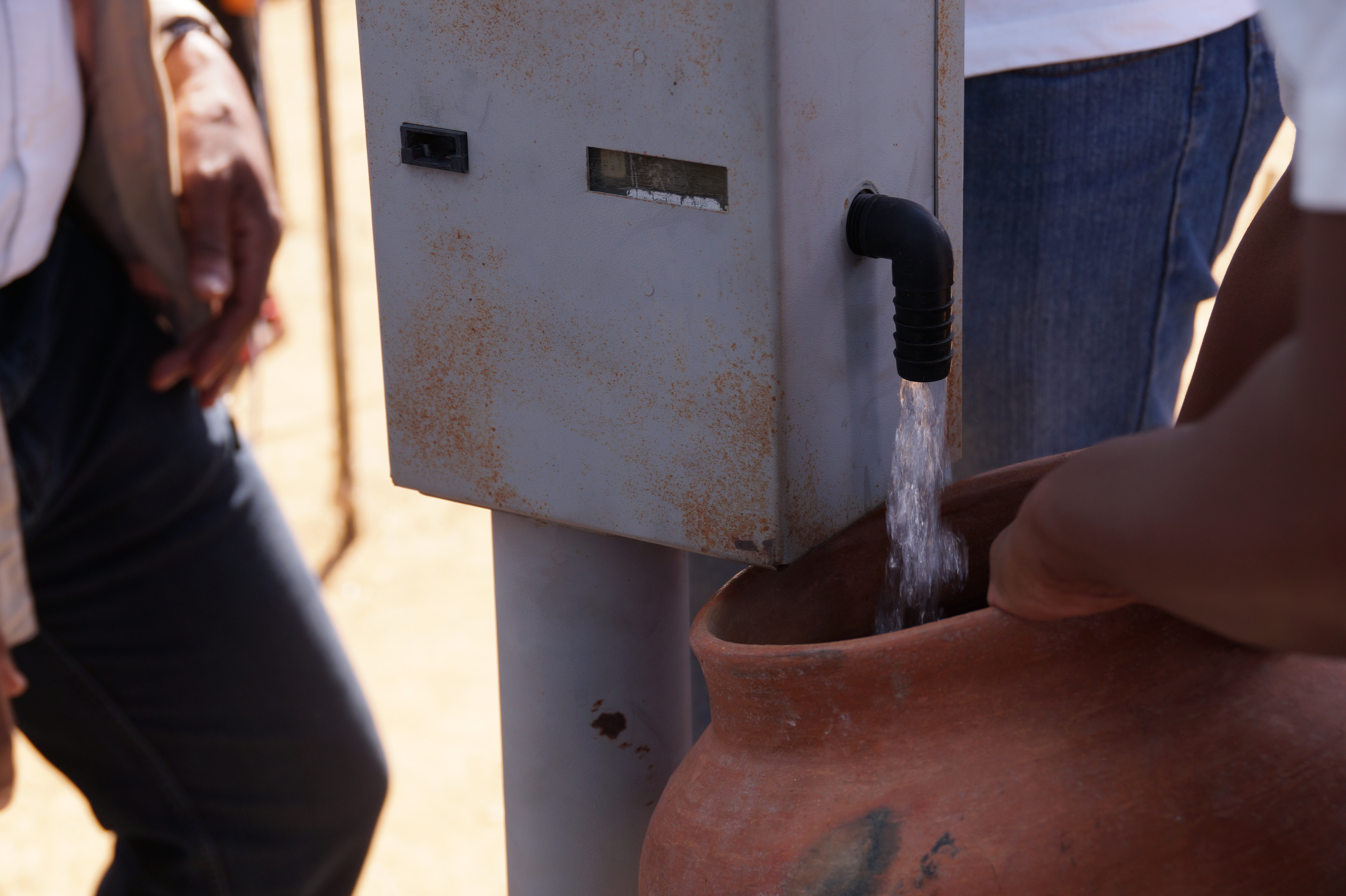
Water Utilities Corporation WTISD 2017

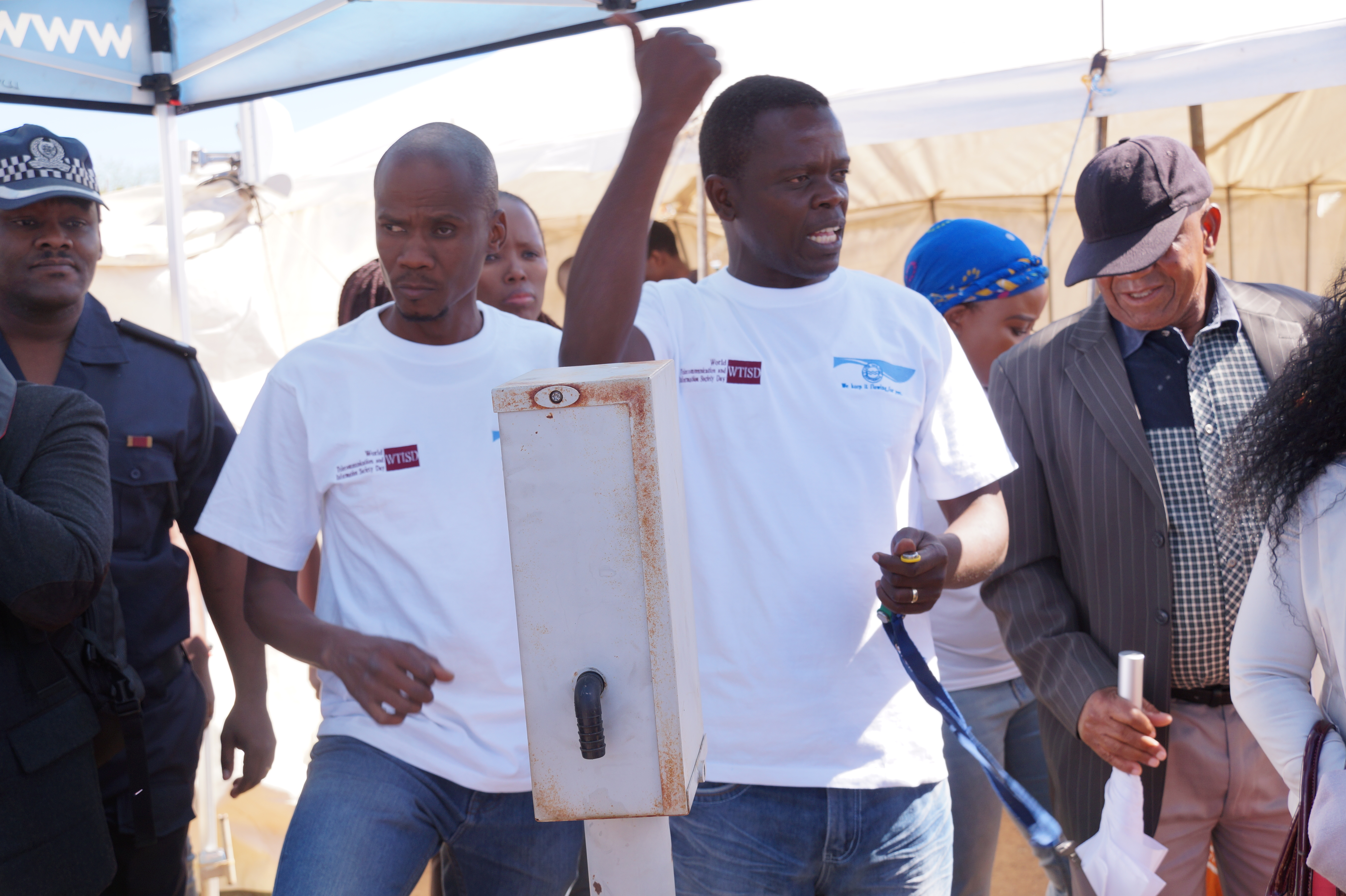
Water Utilities Corporation Stall WTISD 2017

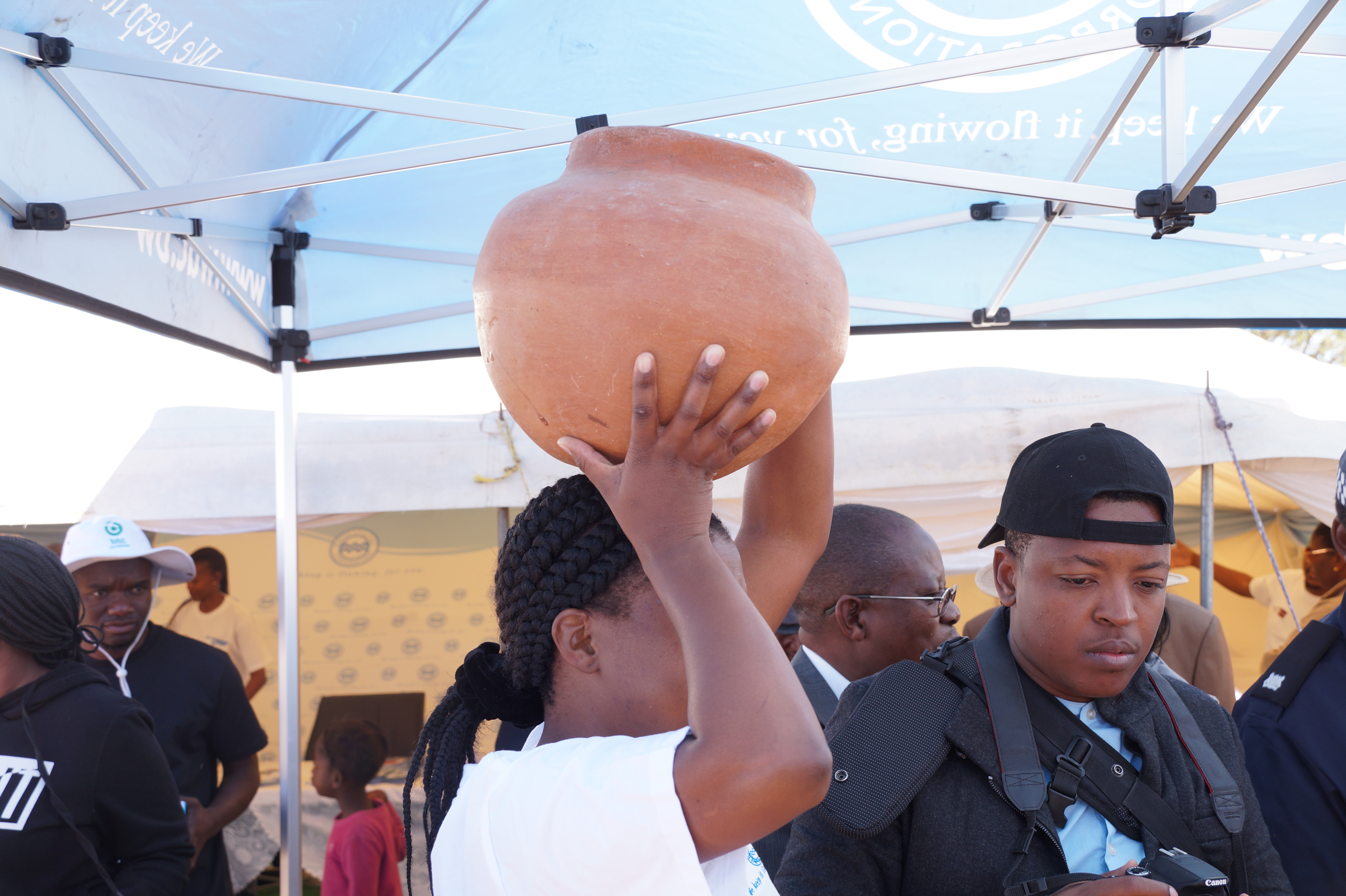
Water Utilities Corporation at WTISD 2017, a woman holding Clay pot.

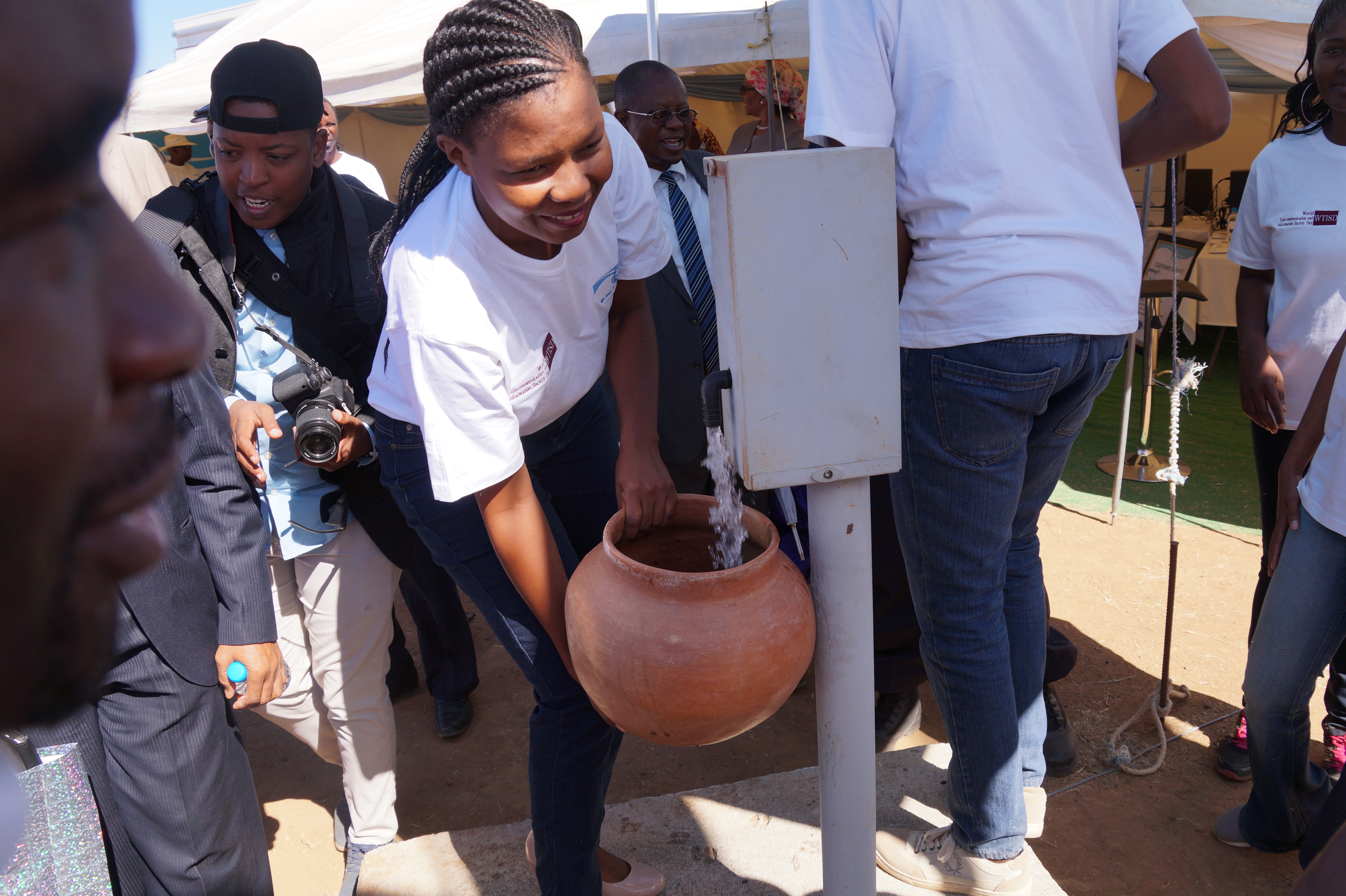
Water Utilities Corporation at the WTISD 2017, demonstrating the tag tap at the World telecommunications and information society day 2017

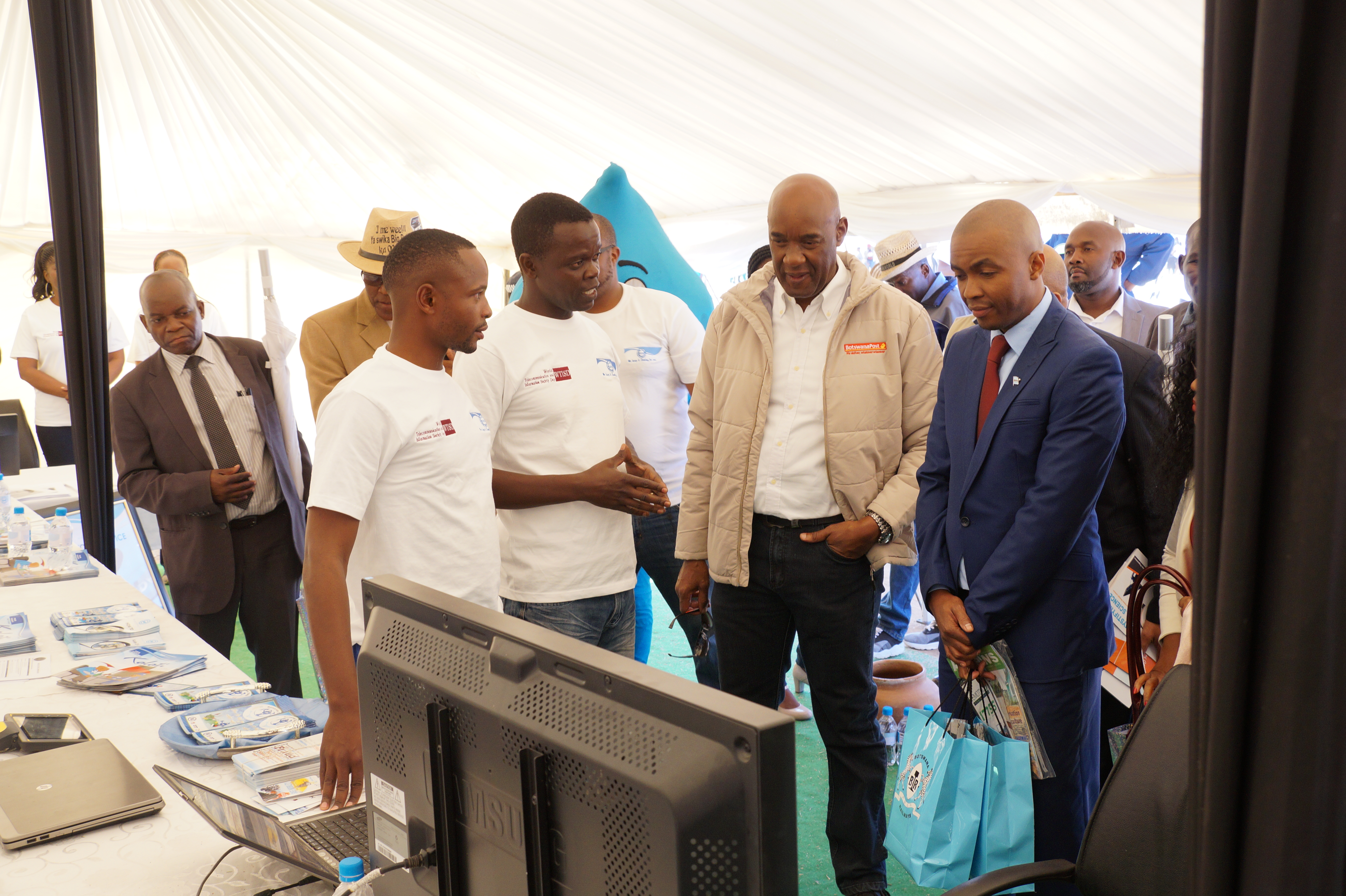
Water Utilities Corporation WTISD 2017 Masunga

== Water Utilities Corporations Services ==
1. Waste water services
2. Laboratory Services
3. Advise before constructing/developing

== See also ==
- Botswana Power Corporation
