= Oliphants Drift =

Coordinates: 24°10′52″S 26°50′54″E

Location of Oliphants Drift

Oliphants Drift is a village in Kgatleng District of Botswana. It is located 85 km (53 mi) north-east of Mochudi, close to the border with South Africa. The village has a primary school and a health clinic, and the population was 758 in 2001 census.
