= Limpopo River =

River in southern Africa

Limpopo River Vhembe
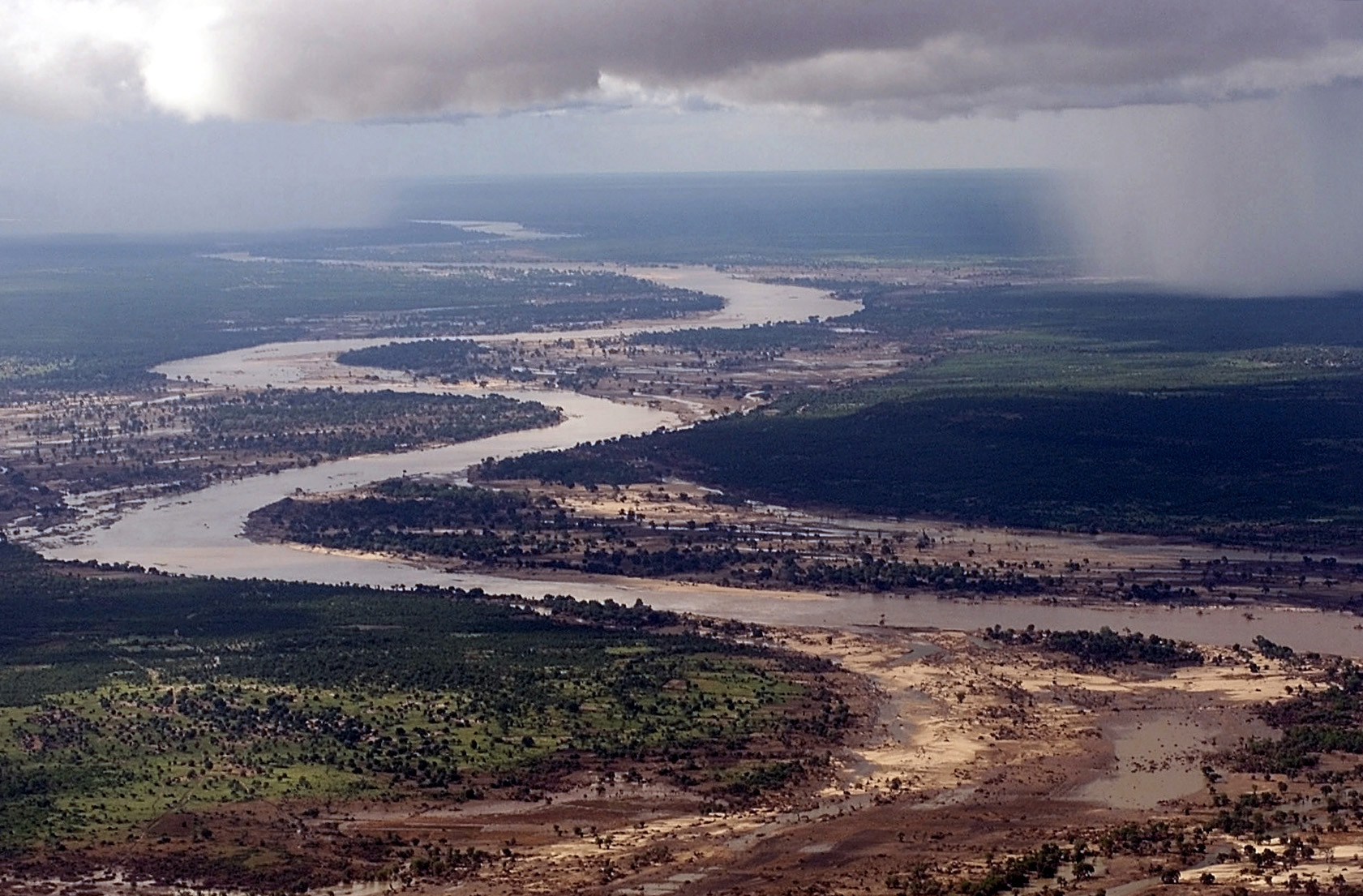
- Limpopo River in Mozambique

- Course and watershed of the Limpopo River

Location
- Country: South Africa, Botswana, Zimbabwe, Mozambique

Physical characteristics
- Source confluence: Marico and Crocodile
  - location: Botswana/South Africa border
  - coordinates: 24°11′29″S 26°52′15″E
  - elevation: 872 m (2,861 ft)
- Mouth: Indian Ocean
  - location: Gaza Province, Mozambique
  - coordinates: 25°12′22″S 33°30′40″E
  - elevation: 0 m (0 ft)
- Length: 1,750 km (1,090 mi)
- Basin size: 415,000 km^{2} (160,000 sq mi)
- Discharge
  - location: Xai-Xai
  - average: (Period: 1971–2000)313.4 m^{3}/s (11,070 cu ft/s)

Basin features
- River system: Limpopo River
- Tributaries
  - left: Notwane, Bonwapitse, Mahalapswe, Lotsane, Motloutse, Shashe, Umzingwani, Bubi, Mwenezi, Changane
  - right: Marico, Crocodile, Matlabas, Mikolo, Palala, Mogalakwena, Kolope, Sand, Nwanedi, Luvuvhu, Olifants

The Limpopo River (/lɪmˈpoʊpoʊ/) rises in South Africa and flows generally eastward through Mozambique to the Indian Ocean. The river is approximately 1,750 km (1,090 mi) long, with a drainage basin of 415,000 km^{2} (160,000 mi^{2}) in size. The mean discharge measured over a year is 170 m^{3}/s (6,000 cu ft/s) to 313 m^{3}/s (11,100 cu ft/s) at its mouth. The Limpopo is the second largest African river that drains to the Indian Ocean, after the Zambezi.

The first European to sight the river was Vasco da Gama, who anchored off its mouth in 1498 and named it Rio do Espírito Santo (lit. 'River of the Holy Spirit'). Its lower course was explored by St Vincent Whitshed Erskine in 1868–69, and Captain J F Elton travelled down its middle course in 1870. The river has been called the Vhembe by local Venda communities of the area where now that name has been adopted by the South African government as its District Municipality in the north.

The drainage area of the Limpopo has decreased over geological time. Up to Late Pliocene or Pleistocene times, the upper course of the Zambezi River drained into the Limpopo River. The change of the drainage divide is the result of epeirogenic movement that uplifted the surface north of present-day Limpopo River, diverting waters into Zambezi River.

== Course ==
Location of the Limpopo River's mouth

The river flows in a great arc, first zigzagging north and then north-east, then turning east and finally south-east. It serves as a border for about 640 kilometres (398 mi), separating South Africa to the southeast from Botswana to the northwest and Zimbabwe to the north. At the confluence of the Marico River and the Crocodile River, the name becomes the Limpopo River. There are several rapids as the river falls off Southern Africa's inland escarpment.

The Notwane River is a major tributary of the Limpopo, rising on the edge of the Kalahari Desert in Botswana and flowing in a north-easterly direction. The main tributary of the Limpopo, the Olifants River (Elephant River), contributes around 1,233 million m^{3} of water per year. Other major tributaries include the Shashe River, Mzingwane River, Crocodile River, Mwenezi River and Luvuvhu River.

In the north-eastern corner of South Africa the river borders the Kruger National Park. The port town of Xai-Xai, Mozambique, is on the river near the mouth. Below the Olifants, the river is navigable to the sea, though a sandbar prevents access by large ships except at high tide.

== Tributaries ==
Left hand	Right hand
Notwane River; Bonwapitse River; Mahalapswe River; Lotsane River; Motloutse River; Shashe River; Umzingwani River; Bubi River; Mwenezi River; Changane River	Marico River; Crocodile River; Matlabas River; Mokolo River; Palala River; Mogalakwena River; Kolope River; Sand River; Nwanedi River; Luvuvhu River; Olifants River

== Basin characteristics ==
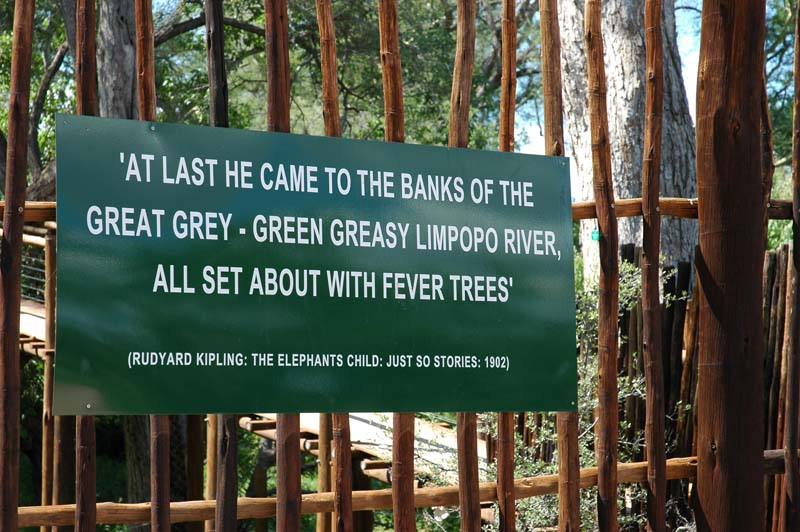
Sign at the viewing deck of the Limpopo River at Mapungubwe National Park, South Africa, featuring a quote from Rudyard Kipling

The waters of the Limpopo flow sluggishly, with considerable silt content. Rudyard Kipling's characterization of the river as the "great grey-green, greasy Limpopo River, all set about with fever-trees", where the "Bi-Coloured Python Rock-Snake" dwells in the Just So Stories is apt. Rainfall is seasonal and unreliable: in dry years, the upper parts of the river flow for 40 days or less. The upper part of the drainage basin, in the Kalahari Desert, is arid but conditions become less arid further downriver. The next reaches drain the Waterberg Massif, a biome of semi-deciduous forest and low-density human population. The fertile lowlands support a denser population, and about 14 million people live in the Limpopo basin. Flooding during the rainy season is an occasional problem in the lower reaches. During February 2000 heavy rainfalls during the passage of a cyclone caused the catastrophic 2000 Mozambique flood.

The highest concentration of hippopotamus in the Limpopo River is found between the Mokolo and the Mogalakwena Rivers. There is a lot of mining activity in the Limpopo River basin with about 1,900 functioning mines, not counting about 1,700 abandoned mines.

== History ==
Vasco da Gama, on his first expedition, was probably among the first Europeans to sight the river, when he anchored off the mouth in 1498. However, there has been human habitation in the region since time immemorial—sites in the Makapans Valley near Mokopane contain Australopithecus fossils from 3.5 million years ago. St Vincent Whitshed Erskine, later surveyor general for South Africa, traveled to the mouth of the river in 1868–69.

A Zambezi shark was caught hundreds of kilometres upriver at the confluence of the Limpopo and Luvuvhu Rivers in July 1950. Zambezi sharks tolerate fresh water and can travel far up the Limpopo. In 2013, approximately 15,000 Nile crocodiles were accidentally released into the river from flood gates at the nearby Rakwena Crocodile Farm.

== Gallery ==
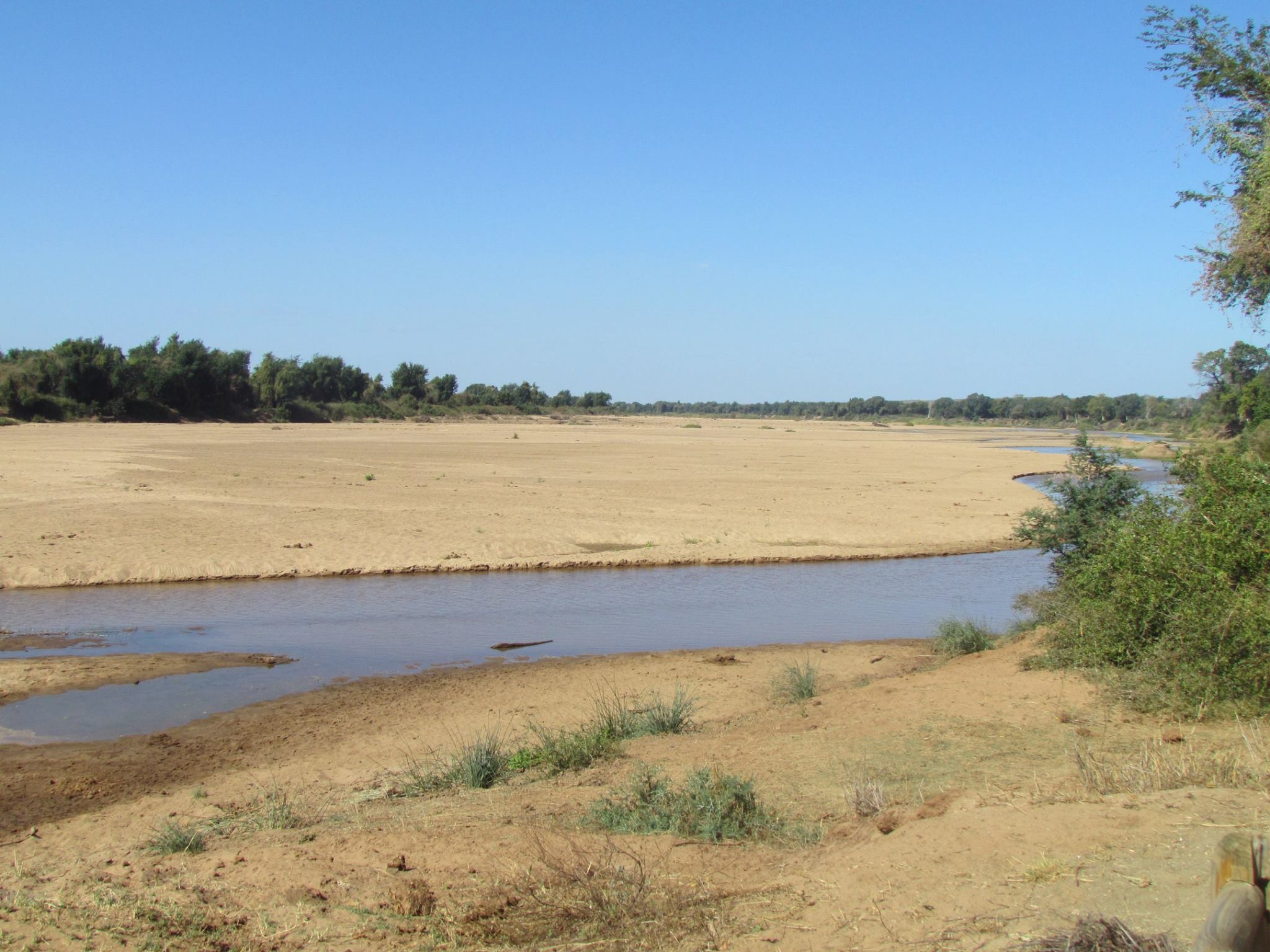
The river as seen from Crook's Corner in Kruger National Park, South Africa. Straight ahead of the river is Mozambique. Across the river is Zimbabwe.

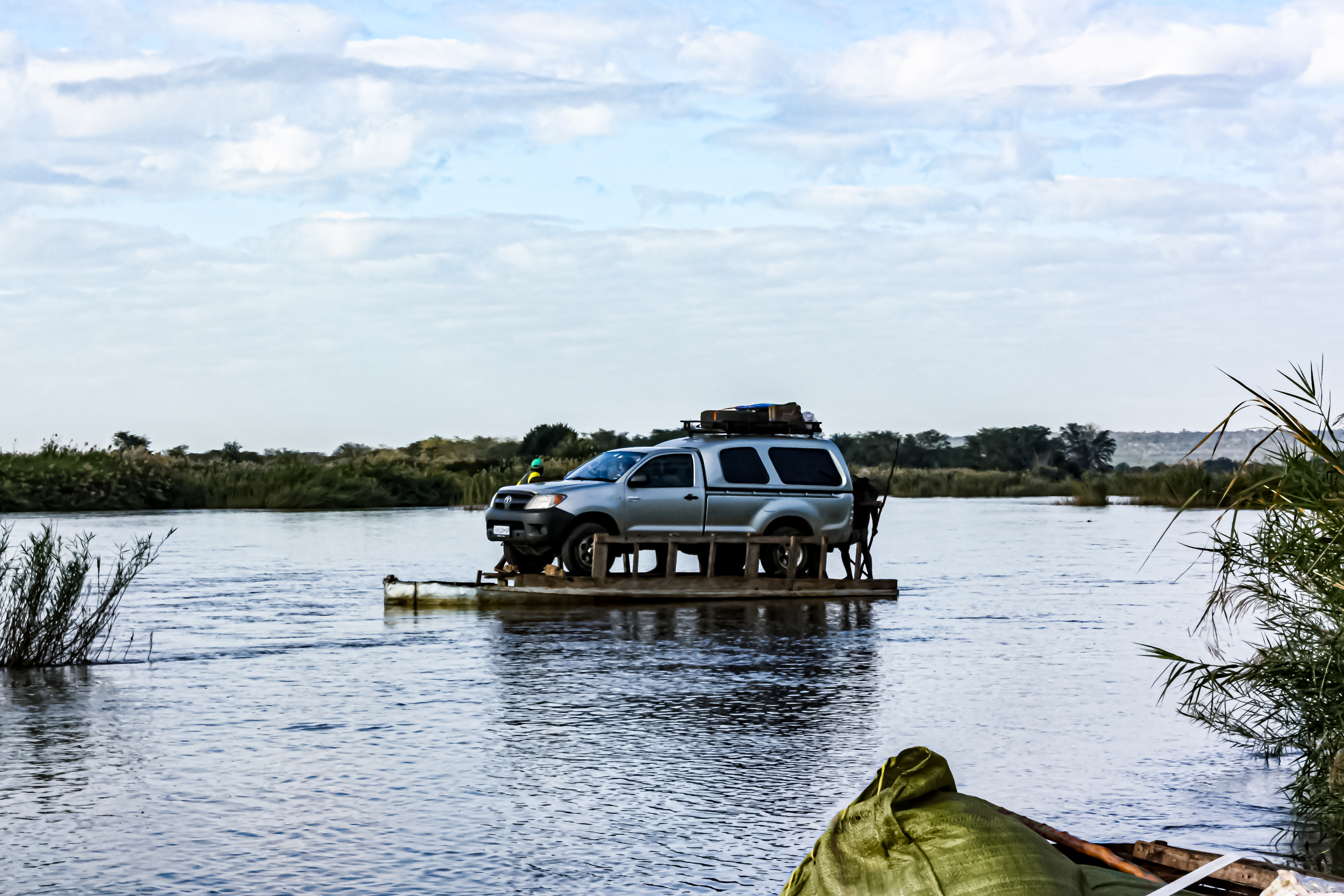
Crossing Limpopo in Mozambique

== See also ==
- Limpopo border gates
- Great Limpopo Transfrontier Park
- List of international border rivers
- Drainage basin A
