= Matlabas River =

Matlabas River: Mothlabatsi; Matlabasrivier
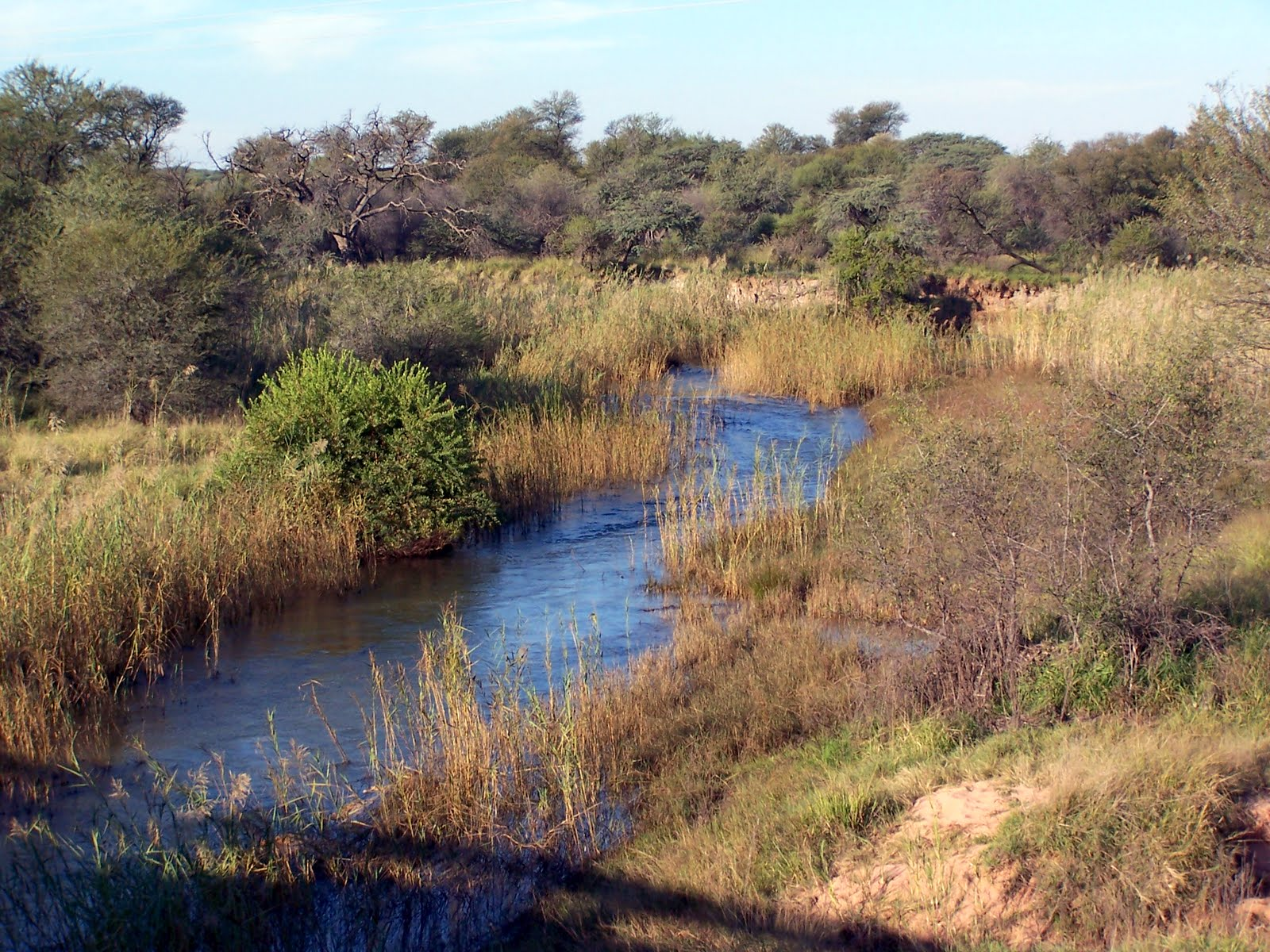

- Location of the Matlabas River mouth
- Etymology: Meaning "sandy river" in the Tswana language

Location
- Country: South Africa
- State: Limpopo Province

Physical characteristics
- Source: Waterberg Massif
  - elevation: 1,700 m (5,600 ft)
- Mouth
  - location: Limpopo River, South Africa/Botswana border
  - coordinates: 23°41′45″S 26°59′53″E
  - elevation: 844 m (2,769 ft)
- Length: 161 kilometres
- Basin size: 3,448 km^{2} (1,331 sq mi)

The Matlabas River is a river in Limpopo Province, South Africa. It is a tributary of the Limpopo River. The river's catchment area comprises 3,448 square kilometres. The entire catchment area of the river is located within the Waterberg District Municipality.

== Course ==
The Matlabas has its source in the western part of the Waterberg Massif within the area of the Marakele National Park. After leaving the mountains it flows roughly north-westwards across the Lowveld until it joins the right bank of the Limpopo River.

Although it is a perennial river, the Matlabas is highly subject to seasonal variations, thus its runoff is very variable. Its main tributary is the Mamba River.

== See also ==
- Drainage basin A
- List of rivers of South Africa
