= Groot Marico =

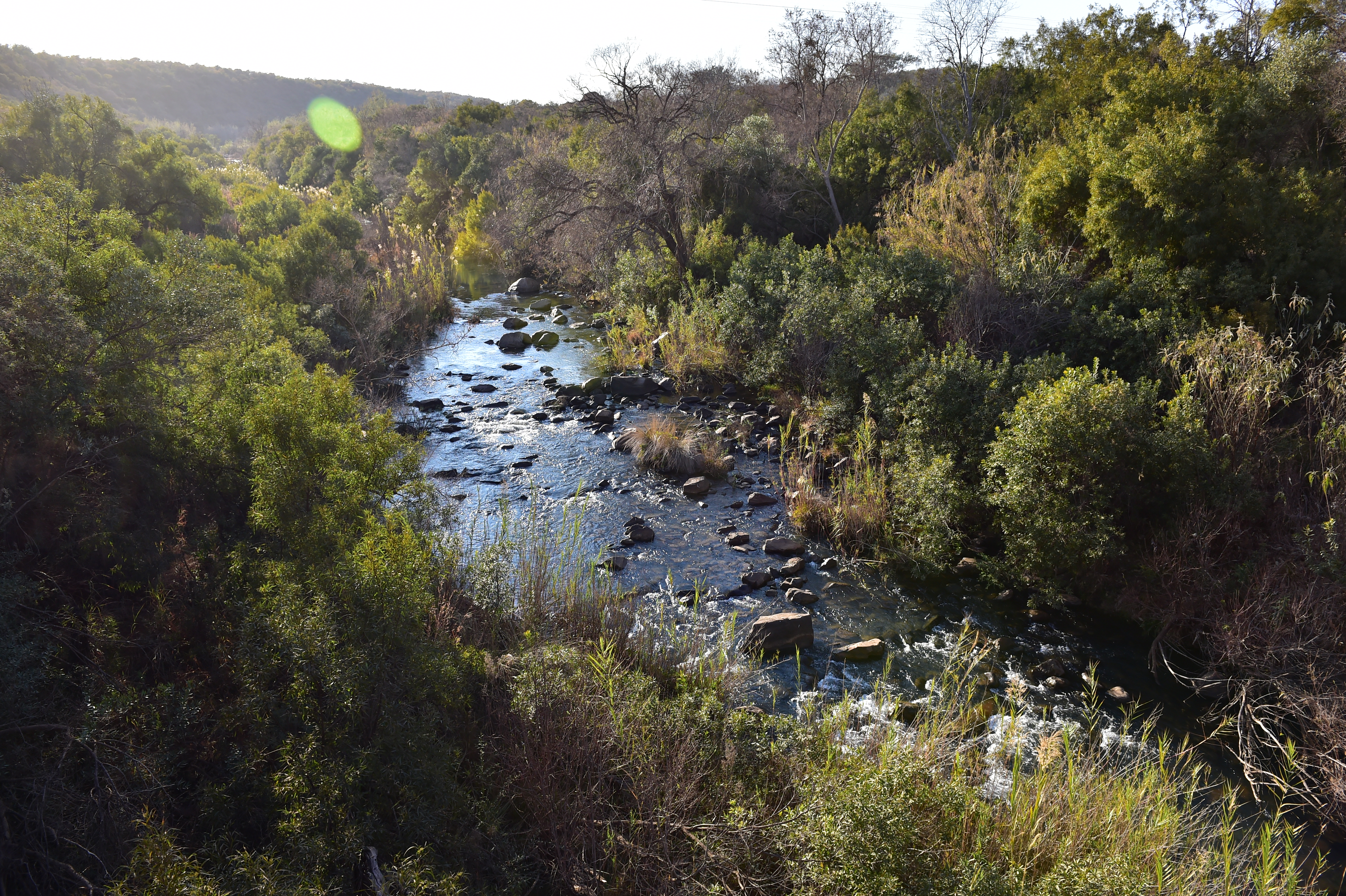
- Marico River

- Location within North West (South African province) Location within South Africa
- Coordinates: 25.588°S 26.401°E
- Country: South Africa
- Province: North West
- District: Ngaka Modiri Molema
- Municipality: Ramotshere Moiloa

Area
  - Total: 36.17 km^{2} (13.97 sq mi)

Population (2011)
  - Total: 3,384
  - Density: 93.56/km^{2} (242.3/sq mi)

Racial makeup (2011)
  - Black African: 86.8%
  - Coloured: 1.2%
  - Indian/Asian: 2.0%
  - White: 8.9%
  - Other: 1.1%

First languages (2011)
  - Tswana: 81.5%
  - Afrikaans: 10.8%
  - English: 3.8%
  - Other: 3.9%
- Time zone: UTC+2 (SAST)
- Postal code (street): 2850
- Website: www.marico.co.za

Groot Marico is a hamlet on the N4 road in the North West Province of South Africa. The economy relies heavily on agriculture, mining and tourism. Groot Marico is named after the Marico River.

== Description ==
The topography comprises dry bushveld with a climate that is ideal for cattle, maize, citrus fruit and tobacco. Open pit quarries in the area extract marble, slate and andalusite, with prospects of large-scale nickel mining on the banks of the Groot Marico river as well as the majority of the farms surrounding the hamlet having sparked a successful regional petition against such development. In 2016 a new diamond prospecting application was initiated, bringing a new round of local community objections and petitioning.

The town was formed by the Voortrekkers in the 1850s and was only proclaimed in 1948.

The word "Marico" was made famous in South Africa by Herman Charles Bosman's writings of this area and later re-enactments of these tales by actor Patrick Mynhardt. Bosman described the area thus:

There is no other place I know that is so heavy with atmosphere, so strangely and darkly impregnated with that stuff of life that bears the authentic stamp of South Africa

At least part of Bosman's musings may have been inspired by sips of the mampoer for which Groot Marico is infamous.

In 2010, the farms surrounding Groot Marico were among the last in South Africa to still be connected through party lines to a manual telephone exchange, which require callers to ask an operator to connect them to other telephone lines by pushing jacks into slots.

Groot Marico is the smallest town in South Africa that host an annual arts festival as well as a mountain bike race.

== Gallery ==
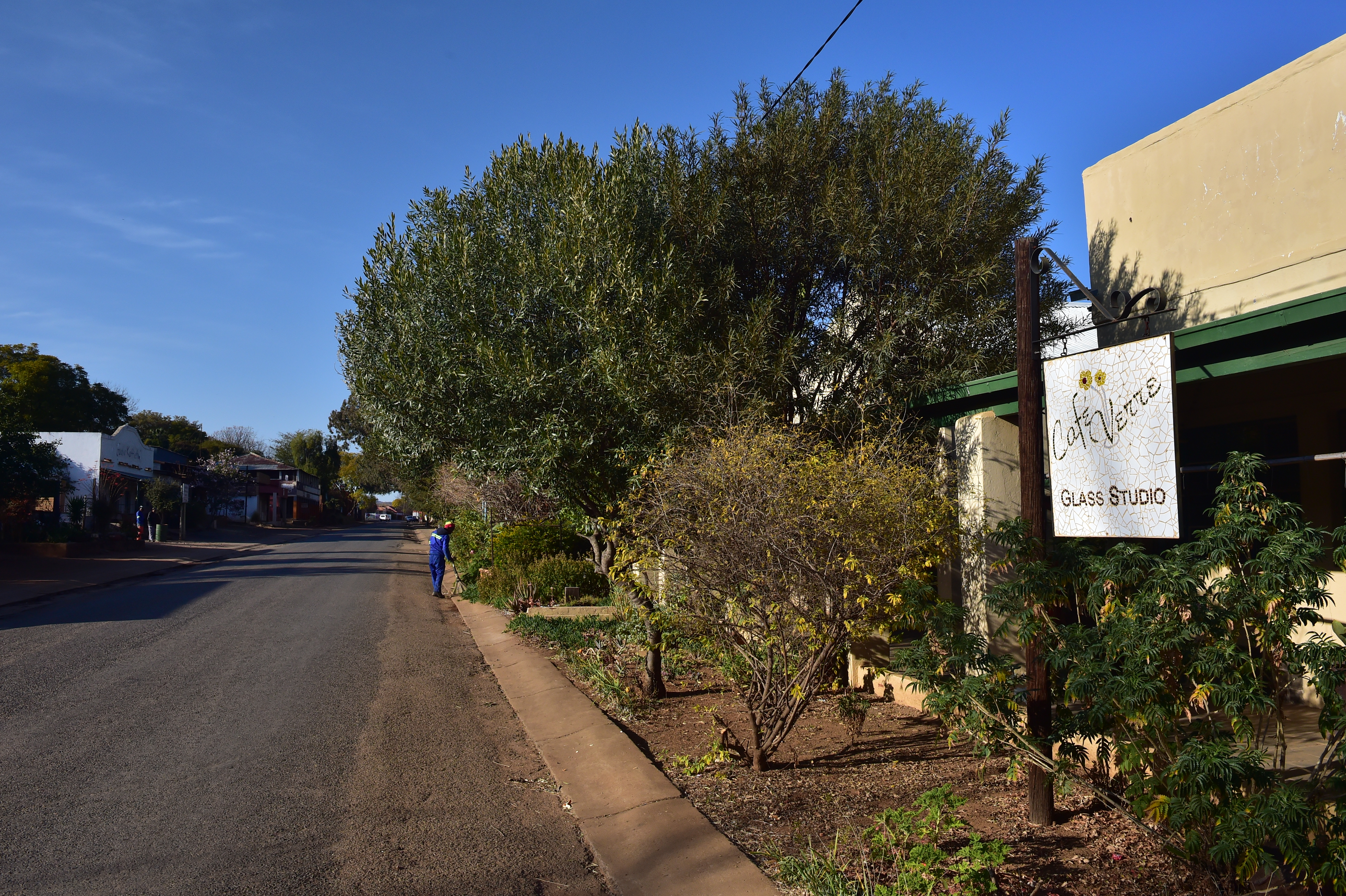
