= Ngotwane Dam =

- Interactive map of Ngotwane Dam
- Official name: Ngotwane Dam
- Location: North West, South Africa
- Coordinates: 25°12′32″S 25°48′32″E
- Opening date: 1982
- Operators: Department of Water Affairs and Forestry

Dam and spillways
- Type of dam: earth-fill
- Impounds: Ngotwane River
- Height: 19 metres (62 ft)
- Length: 290 metres (950 ft)

Reservoir
- Creates: Ngotwane Dam Reservoir
- Total capacity: 18,800,000 cubic metres (660,000,000 cu ft)
- Catchment area: 518 km^{2}
- Surface area: 390 hectares (960 acres)

Ngotwane Dam is an earth-fill type dam located on the Ngotwane River, near Lobathleng, North West, South Africa. It was established in 1982 and serves primarily for irrigation purposes. The hazard potential of the dam has been ranked significant (2).

== See also ==
- List of reservoirs and dams in South Africa
- List of rivers of South Africa
