= Molatedi Dam =

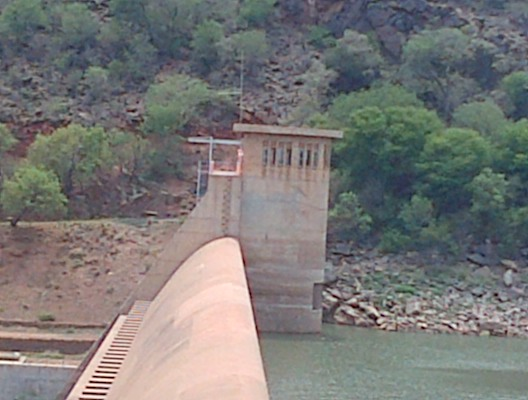
- Molatedi dam at the left
- Interactive map of Molatedi Dam
- Official name: Molatedi Dam
- Location: North West, South Africa
- Coordinates: 24°52′13″S 26°27′1″E
- Opening date: 1986
- Operators: Department of Water Affairs and Forestry

Dam and spillways
- Type of dam: earth-fill
- Impounds: Marico River
- Height: 29 metres (95 ft)
- Length: 260 metres (850 ft)

Reservoir
- Creates: Molatedi Dam Reservoir
- Total capacity: 203,000,000 cubic metres (7.2×10^{9} cu ft)
- Catchment area: 8707 km^{2}
- Surface area: 3,600 hectares (8,900 acres)

Molatedi Dam is an earth-fill type dam located on the Marico River, near Zeerust, North West, South Africa. It was established in 1986 and serves mainly for irrigation purposes and domestic supply. The hazard potential of the dam has been ranked high (3).

== See also ==
- List of reservoirs and dams in South Africa
- List of rivers of South Africa
