= Gaborone Dam =

Dam in Botswana

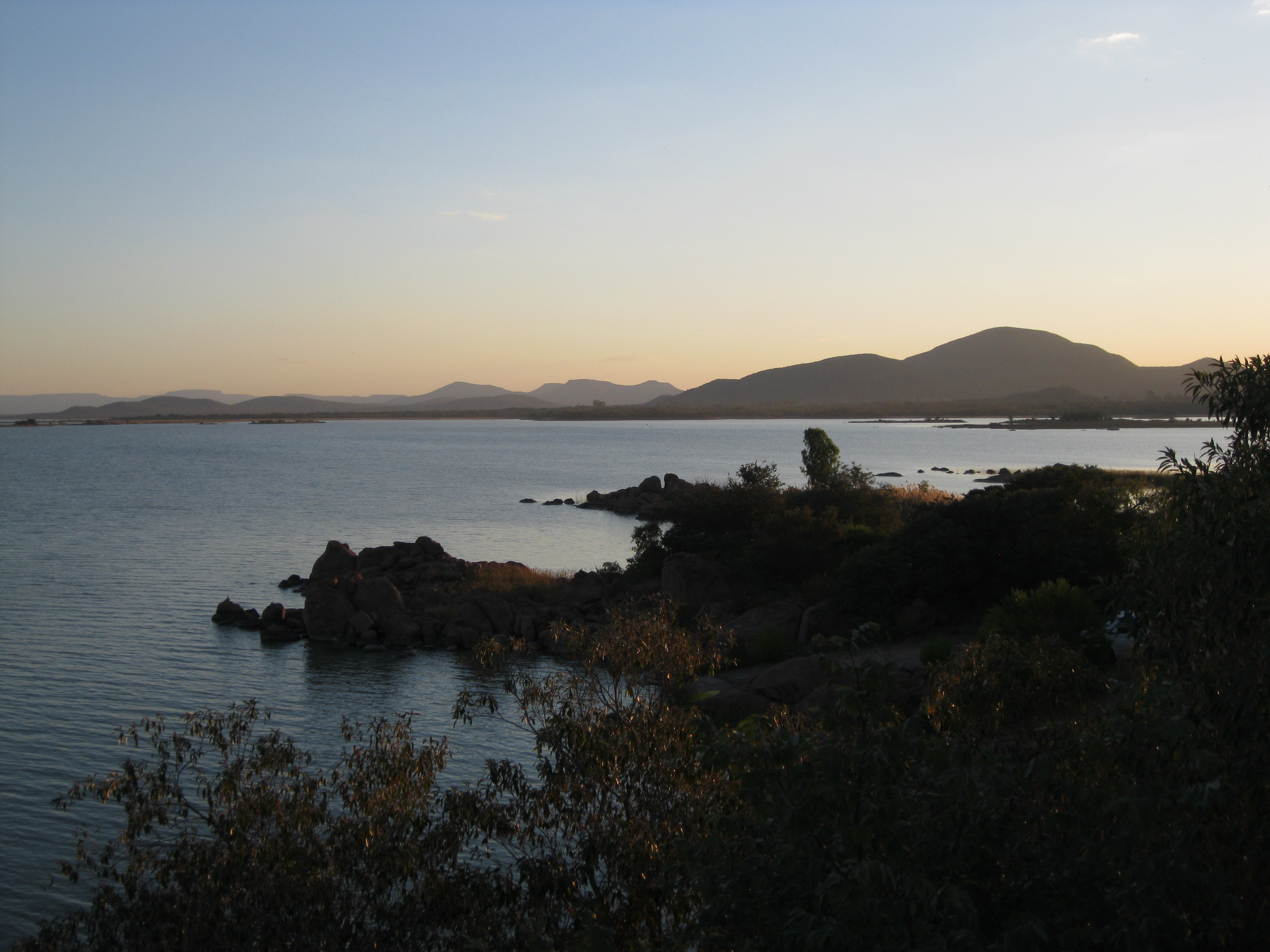
- Gaborone Dam at sunset

- Location within Botswana
- Country: Botswana
- Location: South-East District
- Coordinates: 24.700161°S 25.926381°E
- Purpose: Urban water supply
- Construction began: 1963
- Opening date: 1964

Dam and spillways
- Type of dam: Embankment, earth-fill
- Height: 25 metres (82 ft)
- Length: 3.6 kilometres (2.2 mi)

Reservoir
- Total capacity: 141,100,000 cubic metres (4.98×10^{9} cu ft)
- Surface area: 15 square kilometres (5.8 sq mi).

The Gaborone Dam is a dam on the Notwane River in Botswana with a capacity of 141,100,000 cubic metres (4.98×10^{9} cu ft). The dam is operated by the Water Utilities Corporation, and supplies water to the capital city of Gaborone.

== Location ==
The Gaborone Dam is located south of Gaborone along the Gaborone-Lobatse road, and provides water for both Gaborone and Lobatse. The effective catchment area covers about 225 square kilometres (87 sq mi), drained by the Notwane river and the lesser Taung, Metsemaswaane and Nywane rivers. Between 1971 and 2000, average annual rainfall was between 450 millimetres (18 in) and 550 millimetres (22 in). Temperatures range from 10 °C (50 °F) in winter to 37 °C (99 °F) in summer. Average potential evapotranspiration is about 1,400 millimetres (55 in) annually. (Note: In a dry environment where annual precipitation is lower than potential evapotranspiration, the soil and even the river beds will often be dry except in the rainy season.)

== Description ==
The dam construction began in 1963, capturing water from the Notwane River, at a time when the new capital city of Gaborone was in the planning stages. The original dam was completed in 1964. The dam is an earthcore fill structure. During the 1965-66 rainy season the reservoir filled and overflowed.

Between 1983 and 1985 the dam was raised by 7 metres (23 ft) to increase capacity, reaching a maximum height of 25 metres (82 ft) and a length of 3.6 kilometres (2.2 mi). Raising the dam had to be done extremely carefully to ensure that the impervious upstream zone of the dam remained intact and was extended up the raised bank. Most of the reservoir is less than 10 feet (3.0 m) deep. The surface area of the reservoir when full is 15 square kilometres (5.8 sq mi).

Until completion of the Dikgatlhong Dam in 2011, the Gaborone dam was the largest in Botswana.

== Issues ==
After the dam was opened and filled, the average water levels began to drop. In the part, this was due to a cyclical change in rainfall, reducing the amount of water fed into the reservoir and increasing the impact of evaporation in the hot, dry climate. In part it was due to growth of the city and growing per-capita demand for water as the population became more affluent, using water for purposes such as filling swimming pools and washing cars. By the end of 2002 the reservoir was 79% full, and by the start of 2004 it was 54% full. By the end of 2004 the reservoir was just 27% full and the government was forced to impose harsh restrictions on water use. By September 2005 the reservoir was down to 17% full, or 34 litres (7.5 imp gal; 9.0 US gal) per citizen of Gaborone.

In the drought-prone country, the water supply is a constant concern. A neon signboard in the city informs residents how full the reservoir is. The reservoir and the green buffer zone that surrounds it are the largest and most fragile ecosystem in the Gaborone area. A book published in 2004 noted that storm water drainage is poor in Gaborone, causing recurring street floods, and that pit latrines and overflowing sewage ponds endanger the water in the reservoir.

== Reservoir use ==
The reservoir is starting to be marketed as a recreational area. The northern end of the reservoir is planned to become an entertainment venue called The Waterfront. There is a yacht club, called Gaborone Yacht Club, on the northern side of the lake. The southern end houses the Kalahari Fishing Club and a new public facility called City Scapes. City Scapes contains parks, playgrounds, and boating facilities. The dam is popular with birdwatchers, windsurfers, and anglers. However, there is no swimming due to crocodiles and parasitic bilharzias, which can transmit the serious disease schistosomiasis.

== Gallery ==
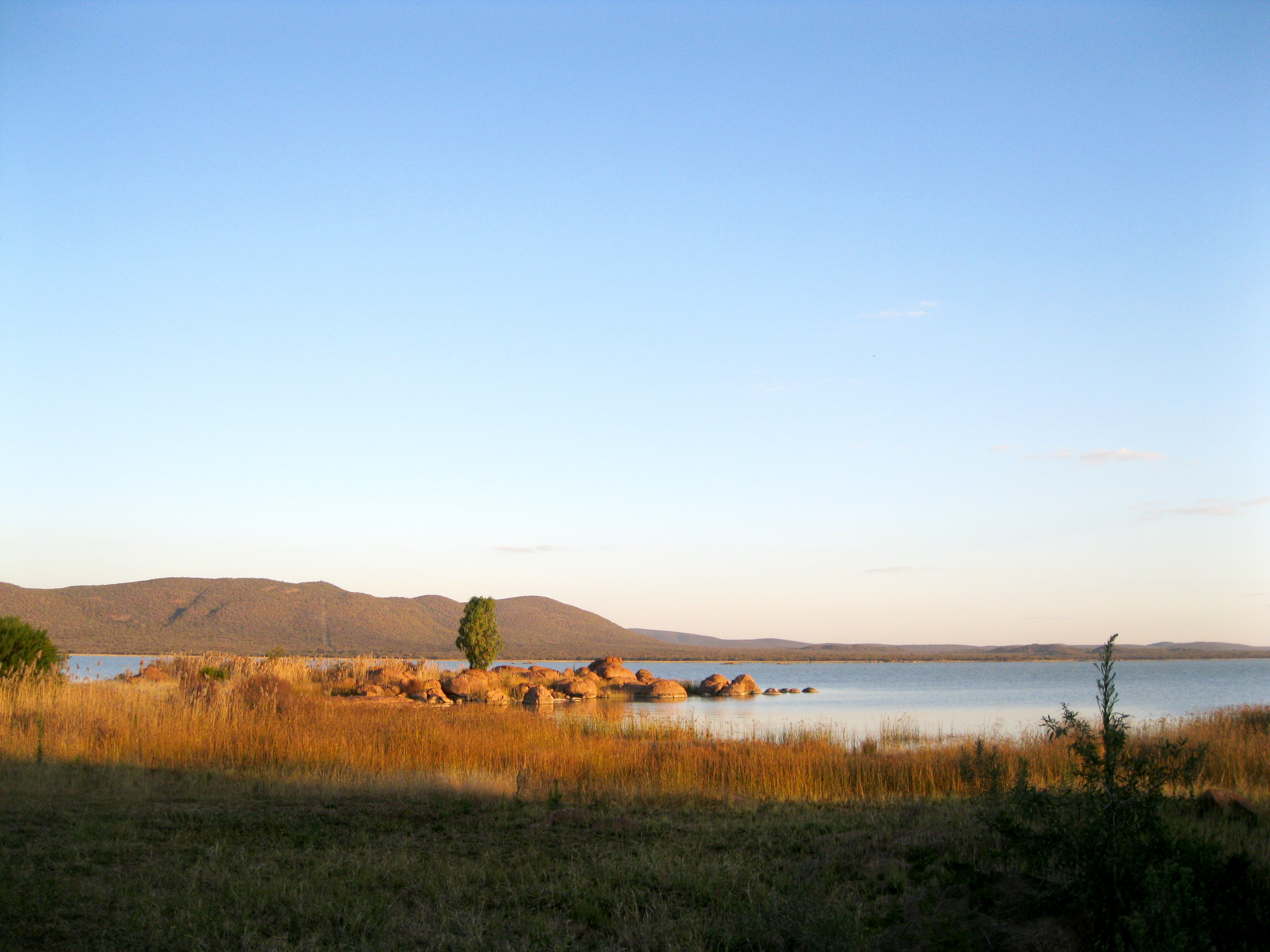

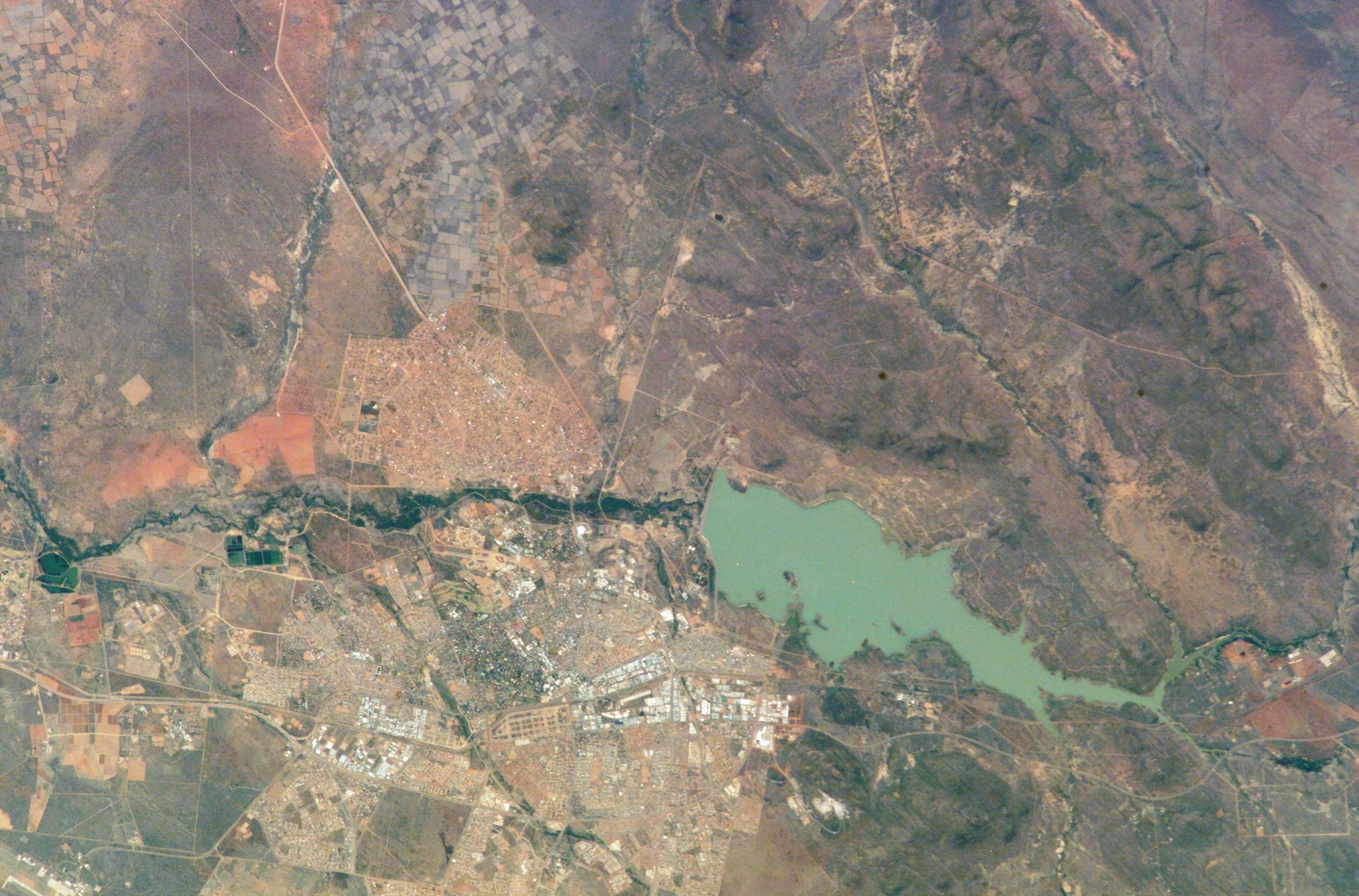
View from space

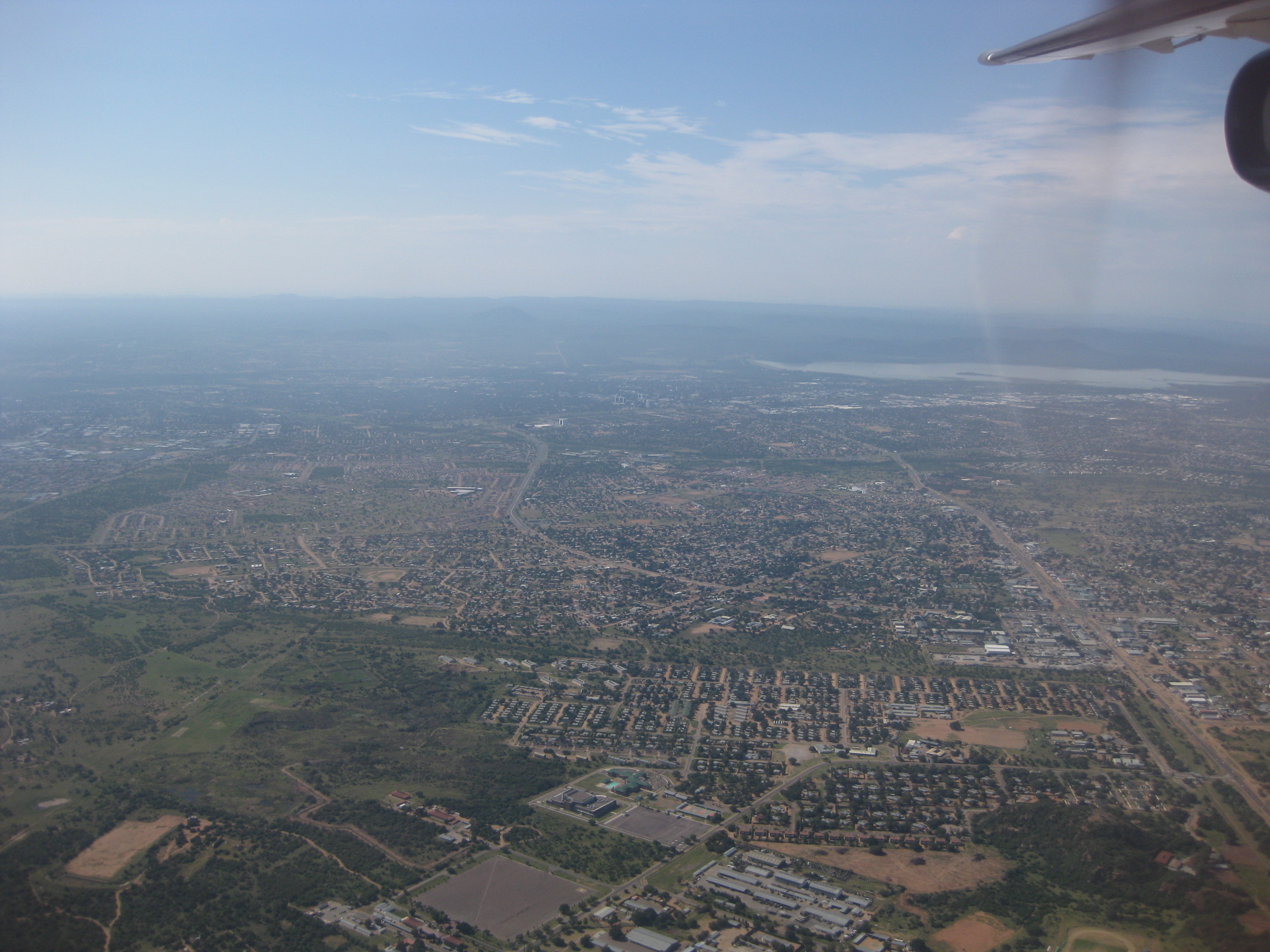
Gaborone from the air, dam in the distance
