= Provincial park =

Protected area managed at the provincial level

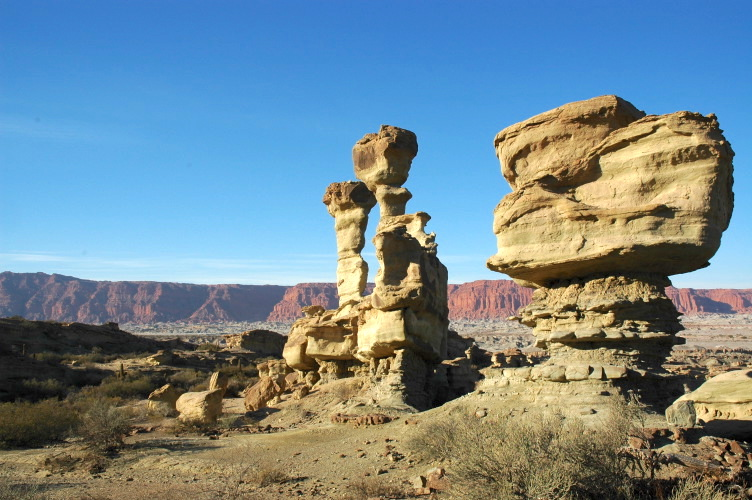
Ischigualasto Provincial Park

A provincial park (or territorial park) is a park administered by one of the provinces of a country, as opposed to a national park. They are similar to state parks in other countries. They are typically open to the public for recreation. Their environment may be more or less strictly protected.

== Provincial parks by country ==
=== Argentina ===
Provincial parks (Spanish: Parques Provinciales) in the Misiones Province of Argentina include the Urugua-í Provincial Park and Esmeralda Provincial Park. The Ischigualasto Provincial Park, also called Valle de la Luna ("Valley of the Moon" or "Moon Valley") due to its otherworldly appearance, is a provincial protected area in the north-east of San Juan Province, north-western Argentina. The Aconcagua Provincial Park is in Mendoza Province. The highest point is the north summit of the Cerro Aconcagua at 6,962 metres (22,841 ft). The Parque Provincial Pereyra Iraola is the largest urban park in the Buenos Aires Province. It is the richest center of biodiversity in the province.

=== Belgium ===
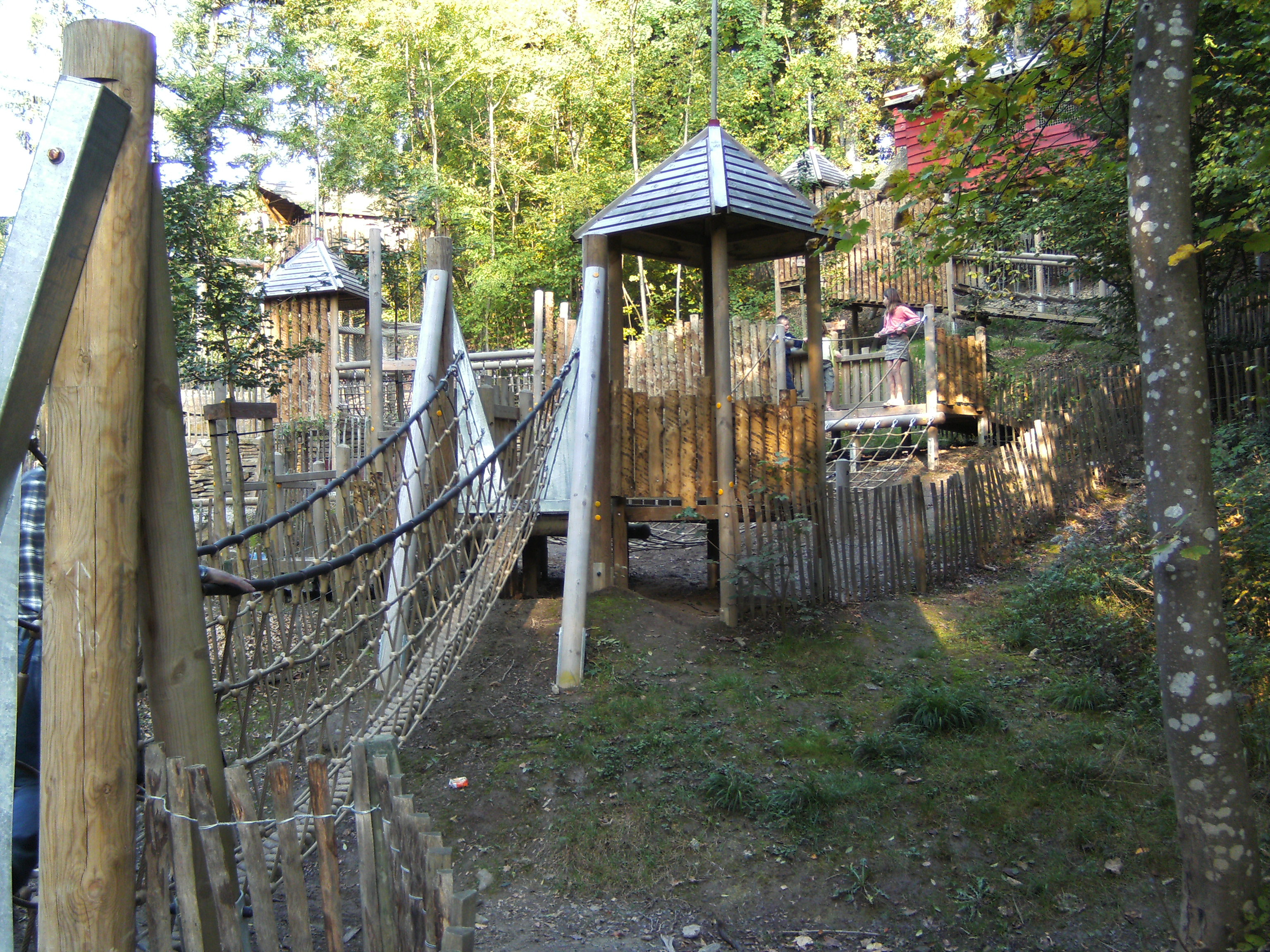
Chevetogne Provincial Park - Play area

Provincial parks in Belgium (Dutch: provinciale domeinen, French: domaines provinciaux) include Bois des Rêves, Chevetogne, Hélécine, Palogne, and Wégimont. These are typically public areas administered by the province for outdoor recreation such as swimming, canoeing, hiking and camping, with few or no fully protected portions.

=== Canada ===
Provincial parks in Canada are protected areas of land and/or water designated by one of the provincial governments to protect nature or historical sites and to support recreation, tourism and education. The first provincial park, Queen Victoria Park in Niagara Falls, opened in 1888. The largest is the 2,355,200-hectare (5,820,000-acre) Polar Bear Provincial Park on Hudson Bay.

Although provincial parks in Canada are not the same as national parks, their structures and purposes are very similar. The provincial and territorial parks systems generally have various park categories. Parks may be ecological reserves without facilities for use by the general public, day use parks or recreational parks that offer many services to visitors, often including bicycle, canoe, or kayak rentals, camping sites, hiking trails and beaches. In the province of Quebec, the provincial parks are labelled "national parks" and are all IUCN category II protected areas (like at the federal level, and as opposed to many provincial parks), and are managed by Société des établissements de plein air du Québec. Many parks in the other provinces have the IUCN designation.

On 24 February 2025, Google said that it would change all parks labelled "state parks" in Canada to "provincial parks" on Google Maps. This issue predated the Trump Administration but gained attention after Trump stated that he would like Canada to become the 51st state.

=== South Africa ===
Nwanedi Provincial Park is a scenic nature and game reserve on the foothills of the Venda mountains in the northern part of the Limpopo province of South Africa. Mokolo Dam Provincial Park almost surrounds the Mokolo Dam on the Mokolo River. It is located 32 km south of Lephalale, just northeast of the Marakele National Park and not far from the Lapalala Game Reserve. Letaba Ranch Provincial Park in Limpopo Province is north of Phalaborwa, next to the Kruger Park and has an area of about 42,000 ha. The Letaba River runs through the park.
