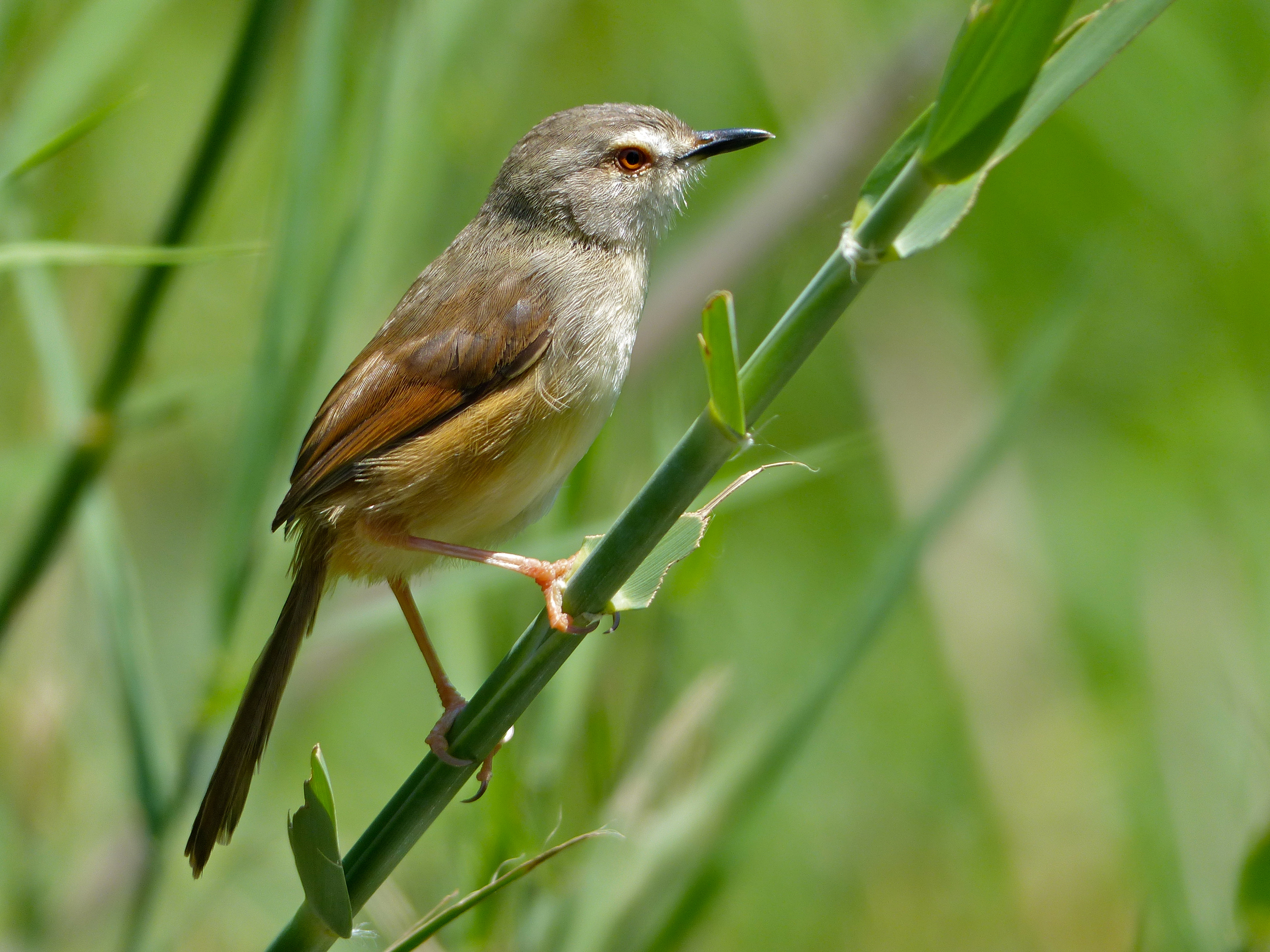
- At Lake Panic, Kruger NP

Conservation status
- Least Concern (IUCN 3.1)

Scientific classification
- Kingdom: Animalia
- Phylum: Chordata
- Class: Aves
- Order: Passeriformes
- Family: Cisticolidae
- Genus: Prinia
- Species: P. subflava

Binomial name
- Prinia subflava (Gmelin, JF, 1789)

Audio
- Calls at the Palala River, Waterberg Biosphere

= Tawny-flanked prinia =

Species of bird

The tawny-flanked prinia (Prinia subflava) is a small passerine bird belonging to the genus Prinia in the family Cisticolidae, a family of Old World warblers. It is widespread and common in most parts of Africa south of the Sahara. The plain prinia (P. inornata) of southern Asia was formerly included in this species but is now usually considered to be a separate species.

== Taxonomy ==
The tawny-flanked prinia was formally described in 1789 by the German naturalist Johann Friedrich Gmelin in his revised and expanded edition of Carl Linnaeus's Systema Naturae. He placed it with the wagtails in the genus Motacilla and coined the binomial name Motacilla subflava. The specific epithet combines the Latin sub meaning "beneath" or "somewhat" with flavus meaning "yellow". Gmelin based his account on a hand coloured engraving by François-Nicolas Martinet that was published to accompany the Comte de Buffon's multi-volume work, the Histoire Naturelle des Oiseaux. The tawny-flanked prinia is now one of 30 species placed in the genus Prinia that was introduced by the American naturalist Thomas Horsfield in 1821.

Ten subspecies are recognised:

- P. s. subflava (Gmelin, JF, 1789) — south Mauritania and Senegal to central Ethiopia and north Uganda
- P. s. pallescens Madarász, G, 1914 — north Mali to northwest Eritrea and north Ethiopia
- P. s. tenella (Cabanis, 1868) — south Somalia, east Kenya and east Tanzania
- P. s. melanorhyncha (Jardine & Fraser, 1852) — Sierra Leone to south Uganda, central Kenya and northwest Tanzania
- P. s. graueri Hartert, EJO, 1920 — central Angola, south, east DR Congo and Rwanda
- P. s. affinis (Smith, A, 1843) — southeast DR Congo and southwest Tanzania to northeast South Africa
- P. s. kasokae White, CMN, 1946 — east Angola and west Zambia
- P. s. mutatrix Meise, 1936 — south Tanzania to east Zimbabwe and central Mozambique
- P. s. bechuanae Macdonald, 1941 — southwest Angola and north Namibia to northwest Zimbabwe
- P. s. pondoensis Roberts, 1922 — south Mozambique and east South Africa

== Description ==
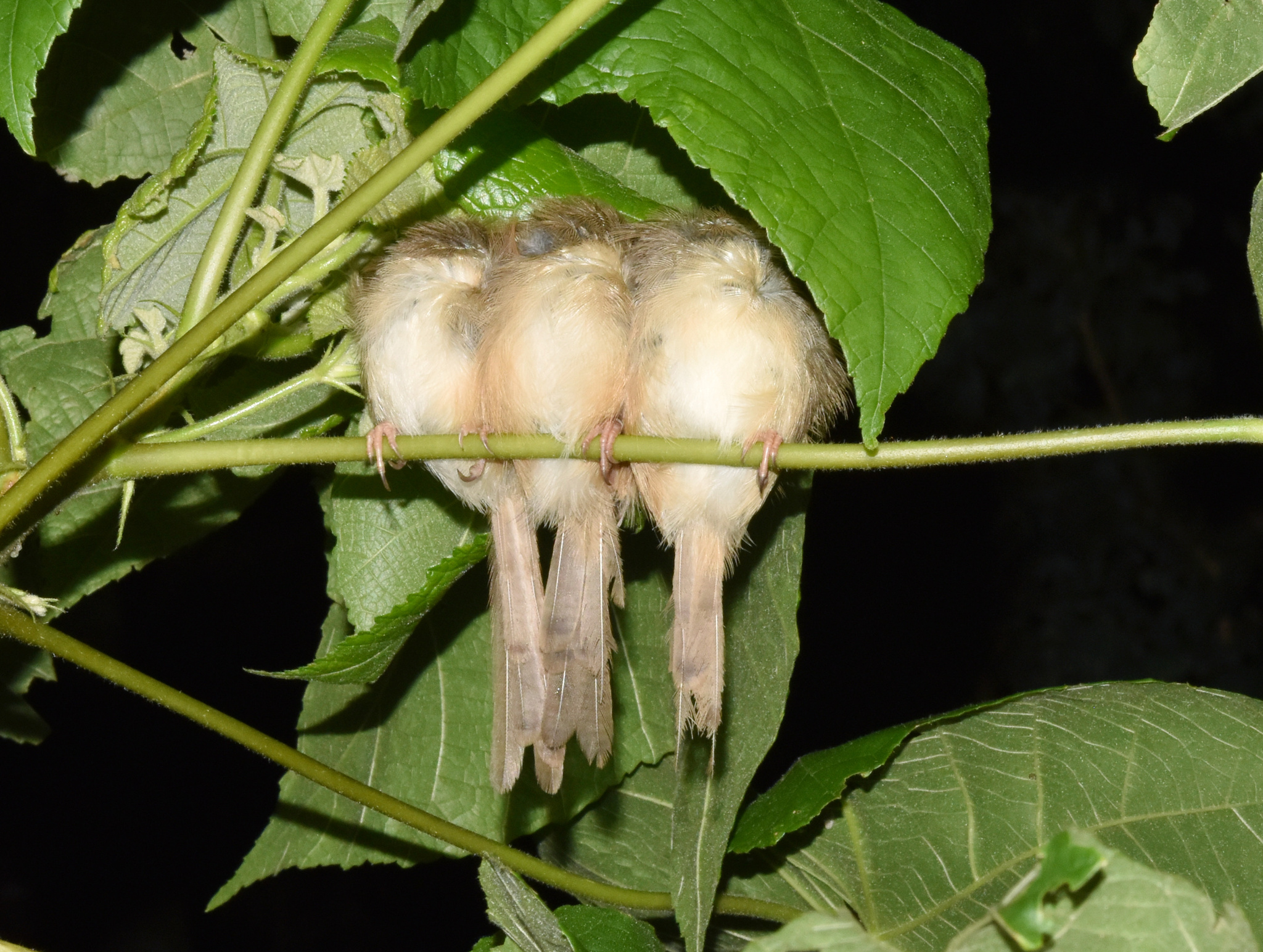
In South Africa

The tawny-flanked prinia is 11–12 cm (4.3–4.7 in) in length with a long, narrow, graduated tail and a fairly long, slender bill. The tail is often held erect or waved from side to side. The upperparts are grey-brown with rufous-brown edges to the flight feathers and a rufous tinge to the rump. The throat and breast are whitish while the flanks and vent are warm buff. There is a whitish stripe over the eye and the lores are dark. The tail feathers have a white tip and a dark subterminal band.

The sexes are similar in appearance. Non-breeding birds have a longer tail than breeding birds. Juveniles have pale yellow underparts and a yellowish bill. There are many recognised subspecies.

The call is short, wheezy and rapidly repeated. The song is a monotonous series of shrill notes. The male often sings from an exposed perch.

The pale prinia (P. somalica) of North-east Africa is similar but paler and greyer with whitish flanks. It inhabits drier, more open habitats than the tawny-flanked prinia. The river prinia (P. fluviatilis) of West Africa is also paler and greyer and has a longer tail. It is restricted to waterside vegetation.

== Distribution and habitat ==
There are ten subspecies distributed across most parts of sub-Saharan Africa except for the driest and wettest areas. It is absent from much of the Congo Basin, southern Namibia, south-west Botswana and the western half of South Africa. It is found amongst shrubs and grass in a variety of habitats including woodland, savanna and cultivated areas. It adapts well to man-made habitats and is not considered to be threatened.

== Behaviour ==
It feeds on insects and other invertebrates. It forages in small flocks which move through shrubs and undergrowth.

The nest is purse-shaped and made of strips of grass woven together. It is built one to two metres above the ground. Two to four eggs are laid; they are variable in ground colour and usually have brown or purple spots or blotches.

== Gallery ==
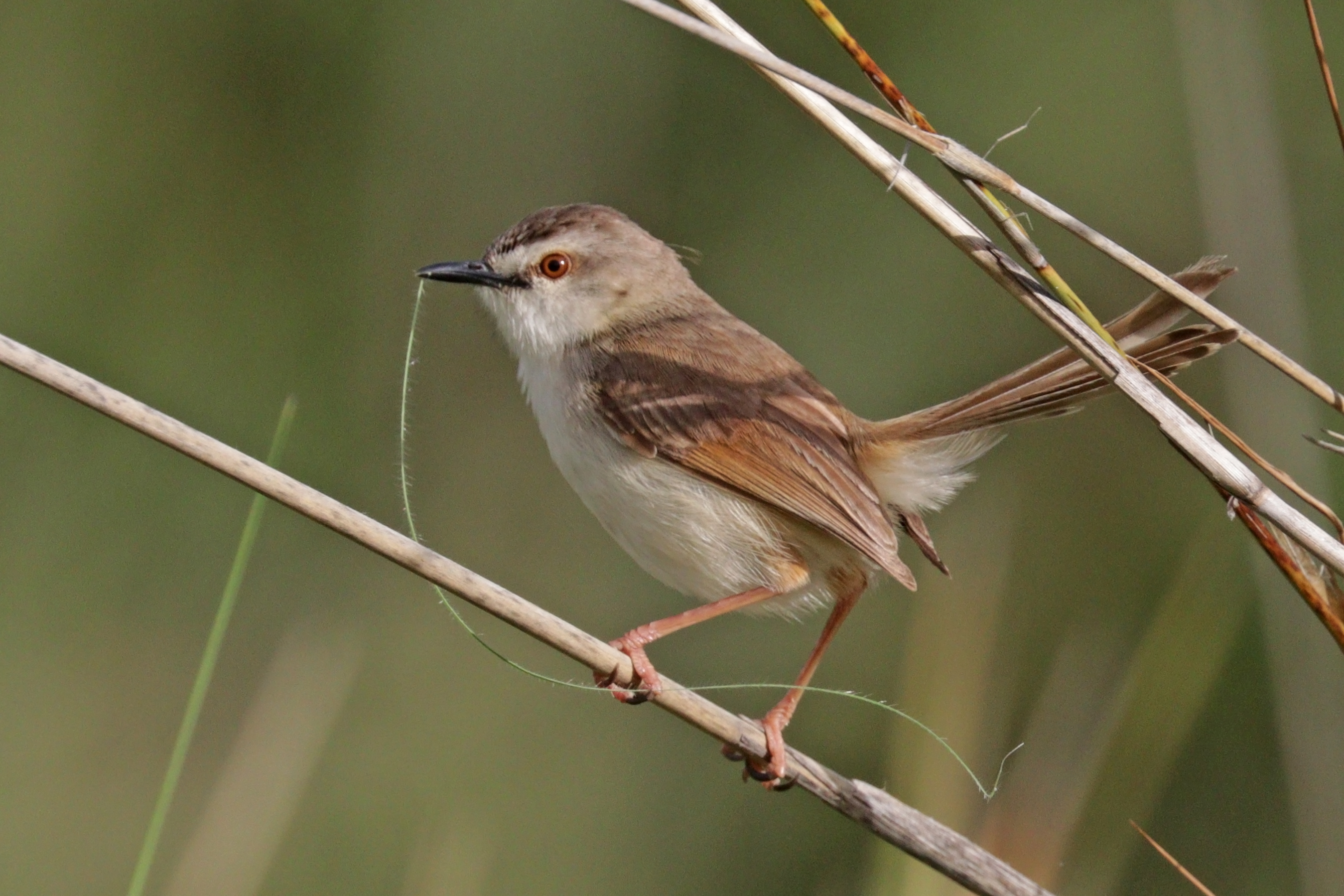
P. s. bechuanae with nesting material, Namibia

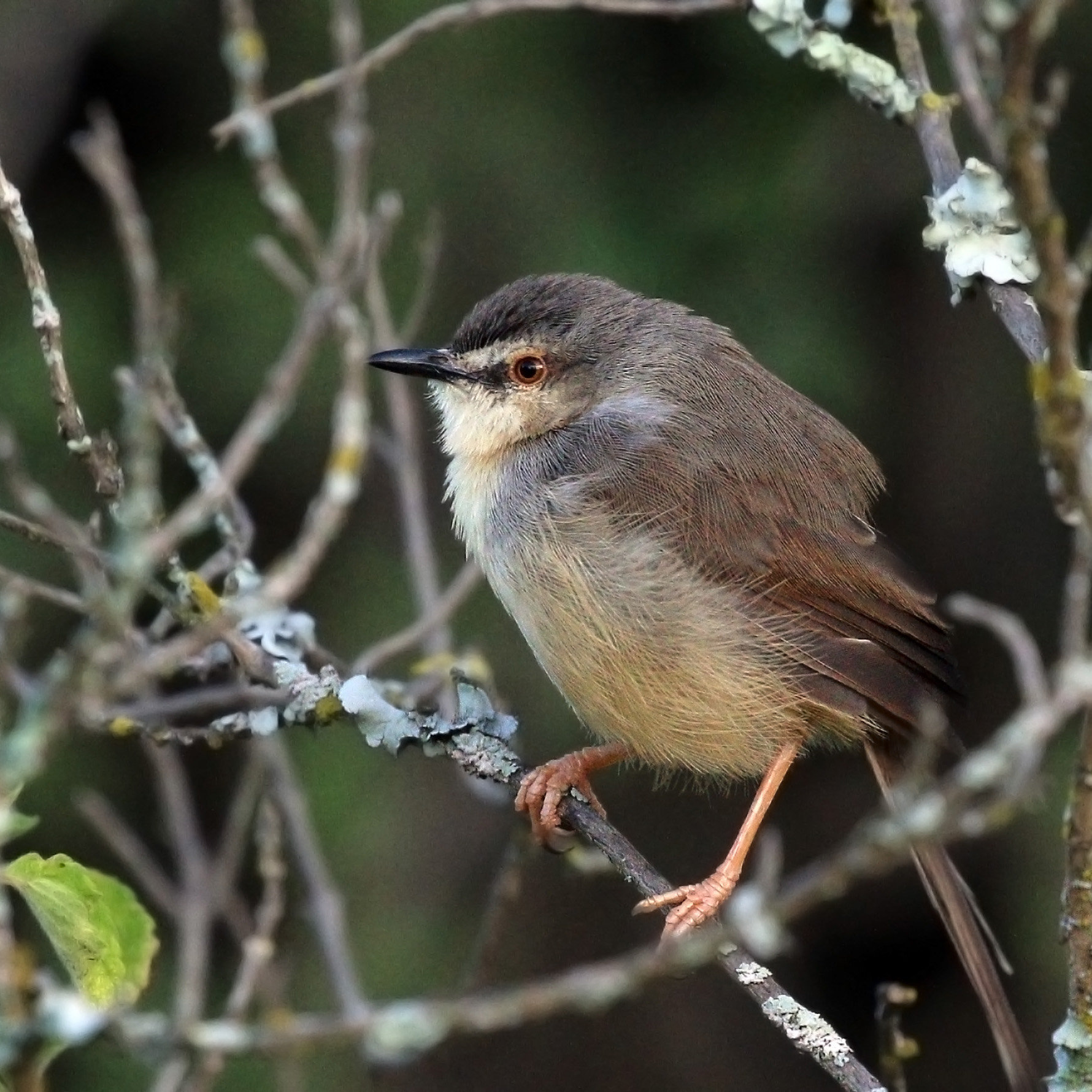
Juvenile P. s. melanorhyncha, Soysambu Conservancy, Kenya

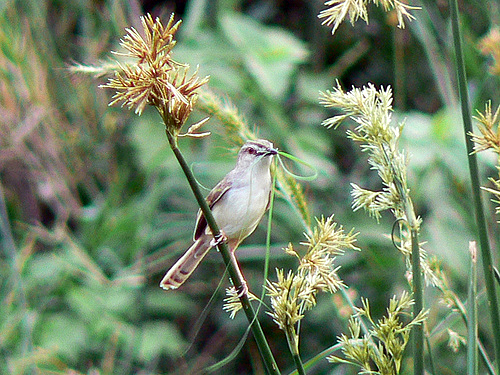
Collecting nest material in Kruger National Park
