= Alma, South Africa =

Alma
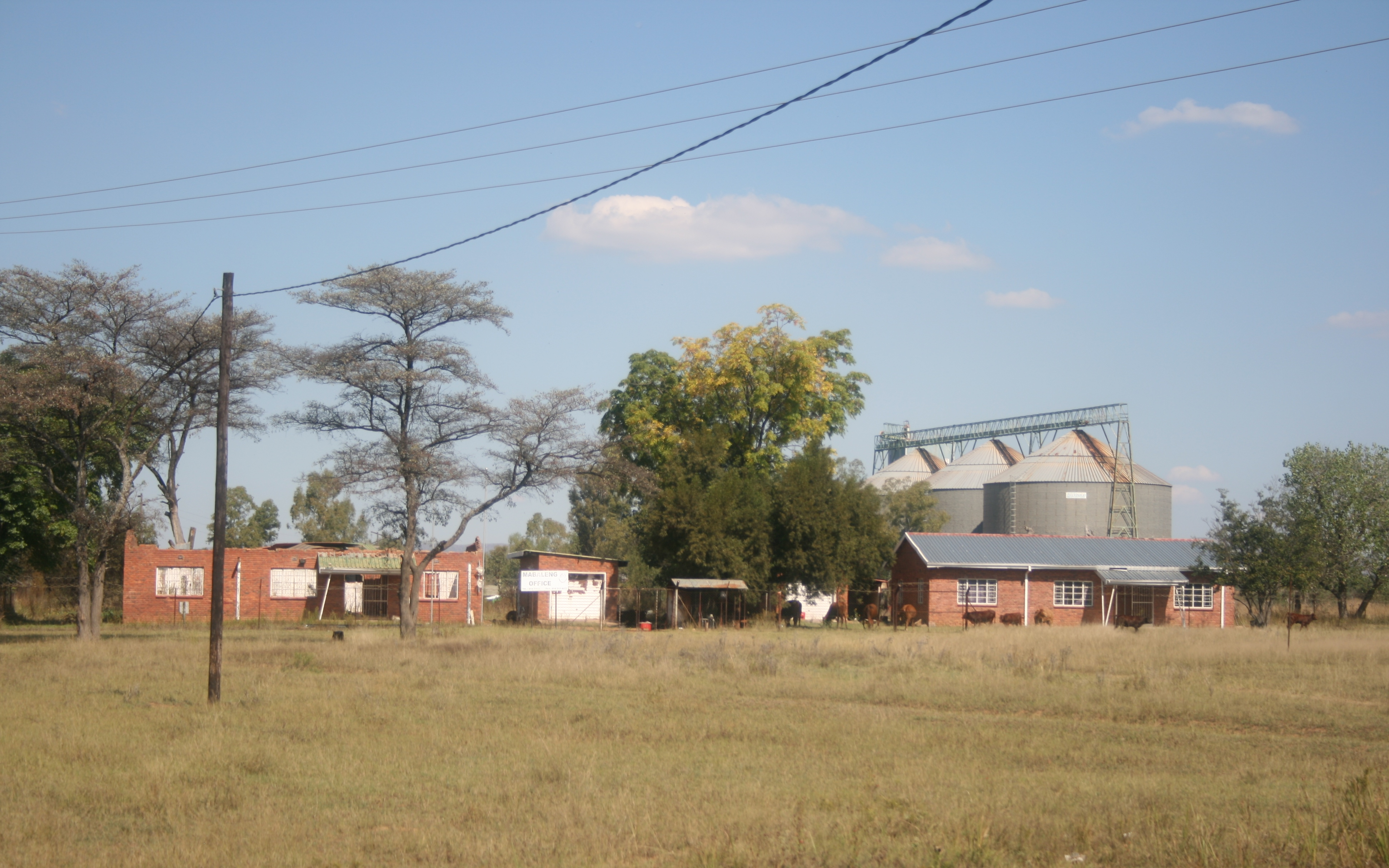
- Houses and grain silo in Alma

- Location within Limpopo Location within South Africa
- Coordinates: 24.489°S 28.071°E
- Country: South Africa
- Province: Limpopo
- District: Waterberg
- Municipality: Modimolle–Mookgophong

Area
  - Total: 0.82 km^{2} (0.32 sq mi)

Population (2011)
  - Total: 1,553
  - Density: 1,900/km^{2} (4,900/sq mi)

Racial makeup (2011)
  - Black African: 99.8%
  - Coloured: 0.1%
  - Indian/Asian: 0.1%
  - White: 0.1%

First languages (2011)
  - Northern Sotho: 65.7%
  - Tsonga: 21.5%
  - Tswana: 3.2%
  - Sotho: 2.3%
  - Other: 7.3%
- Time zone: UTC+2 (SAST)
- PO box: 0512
- Area code: 014

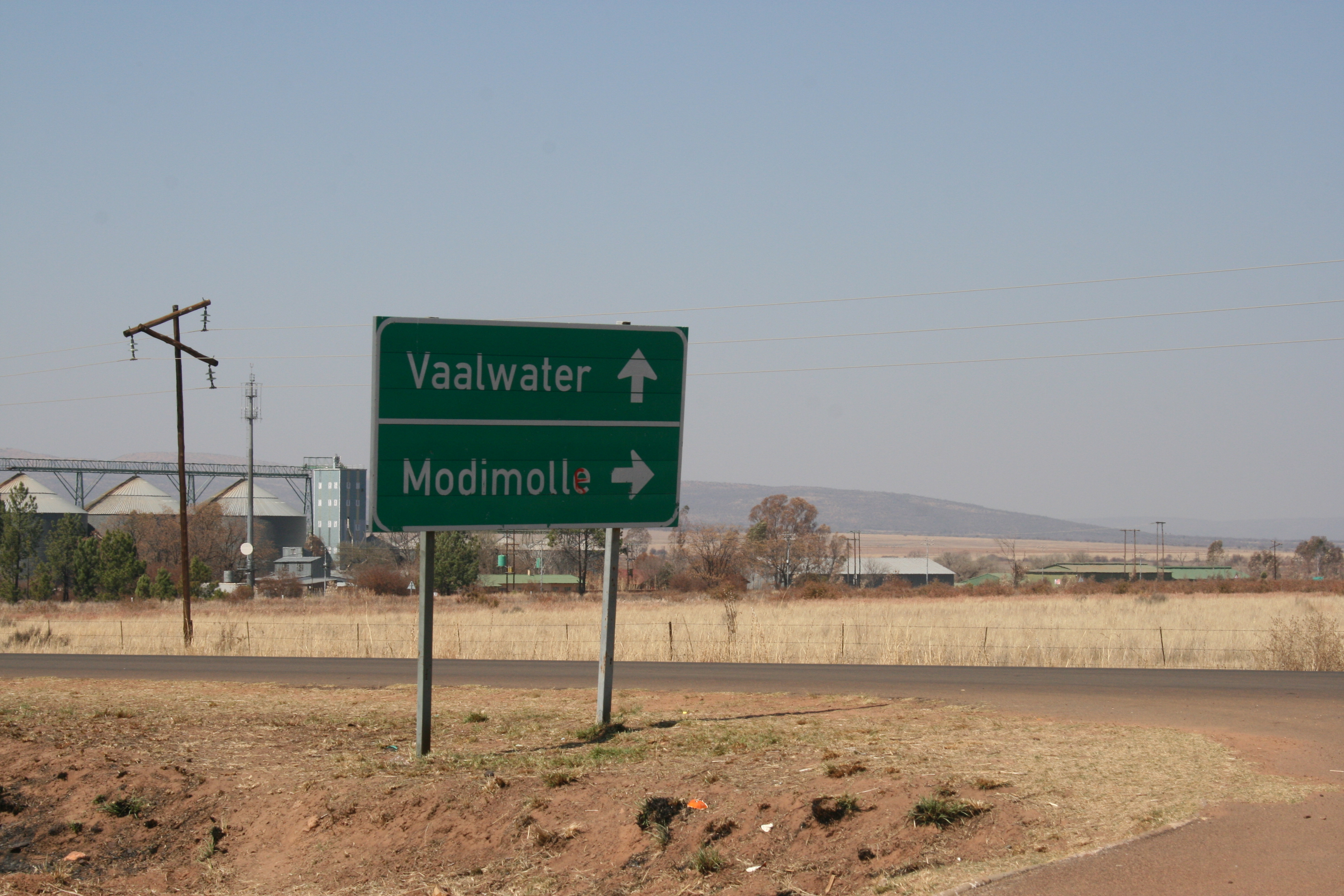
Road sign outside Laerskool Alma showing direction to local towns Vaalwater and Modimolle/Nylstroom.

Alma is a small town situated south of Vaalwater in the Limpopo province of South Africa. The area is surrounded by green-gray bushveld vegetation and several private game reserves are located in the malaria free area.

The Mokolo River originates near Alma at the confluence of the Sand River with the Grootspruit River in a flat, open area with numerous koppies, before it flows through a steep gorge and emerges above the town of Vaalwater. The town is served by Laerskool Alma, a primary and early secondary school situated 24 kilometres (15 mi) from Vaalwater.

== Nearby towns ==
- Warmbaths (now known as Bela Bela)
- Lephalale/Ellisras
- Modimolle/Nylstroom
- Naboomspruit
- Thabazimbi
- Vaalwater
