= Mokolo Dam Nature Reserve =

Protected area in Limpopo, South Africa

- Location within Limpopo Location within South Africa
- Location: Limpopo, South Africa
- Nearest city: Lephalale
- Coordinates: 24°00′S 27°46′E
- Governing body: Limpopo Tourism and Parks Board

The Mokolo Dam Nature Reserve or Mokolo Dam Provincial Park is a protected area of bushveld in the Limpopo province, South Africa. It almost surrounds the Mokolo Dam on the Mokolo River. It is located 32 km south of Lephalale, just northeast of the Marakele National Park and not far from the Lapalala Game Reserve.

The reserve is only 46 km^{2} and is surrounded by the Waterberg Biosphere. There is both sourveld and sweetveld here, and attractions include water sports, birds, and fish. Largemouth bass, bream, carp, and catfish can all be fished there, but one must watch for crocodiles.

Among the birds that can be spotted here are the following:

- Crested barbet
- African fish eagle
- Brown-hooded kingfisher
- Southern grey-headed sparrow
- Egyptian goose
- White-fronted bee eater
- Magpie shrike

== See also ==
- Protected areas of South Africa
