= Welgevonden Game Reserve =

- Location within South Africa
- Location: Limpopo province, South Africa
- Nearest town: Vaalwater, South Africa
- Coordinates: 24°12′15″S 27°54′09″E
- Area: 36,000 ha (89,000 acres)

Welgevonden Game Reserve (Dutch for "well found"), is a 38,200 ha game reserve in the Waterberg District of the Limpopo province of South Africa.

It forms part of the Waterberg Biosphere Reserve which was officially declared by UNESCO in 2001 and currently covers an area in excess of 654,033 hectare.

The reserve comprises mountainous terrain that is dissected by deep valleys and kloofs while flat plateaus characterise most hilltops. Altitude varies from 1080 m in the north to ±1800 m in the southern section of the reserve.

Welgevonden is home to over 50 different mammals, including the Big Five. The diversity of habitat leads to a wide range of wildlife with grassy plains abounding with antelope from the largest eland to the diminutive duiker; and cheetah, lion and leopard are regularly seen close by. There are also numerous rare and unusual species such as brown hyena, aardwolf, pangolin and aardvark – all best seen at night. Over 300 bird species can be seen on the reserve, including rare blue cranes which breed in the southern section early in the year.

== Wildlife ==
Including: lion, elephant, white rhino, buffalo, sable, leopard, antelope, giraffe, warthog, bush pig, aardvark, and pangolin. It has one of the largest populations of white rhino on any private reserve in Africa.

== See also ==
- Protected areas of South Africa
