= Limpopo Tourism and Parks Board =

Tourism in South Africa

Limpopo Tourism and Parks Board is a governmental organisation established in 2001 and responsible for maintaining wilderness areas and public nature reserves in Limpopo Province, South Africa.

== Parks Managed by Limpopo Tourism and Parks Board ==
- Lekgalameetse Provincial Park
- Letaba Ranch Provincial Park
- Mano'mbe Provincial Park
- Mokolo Dam Provincial Park
- Nwanedi Provincial Park
- Tzaneen Dam Provincial Park

== See also ==
- South African National Parks
- Protected areas of South Africa
