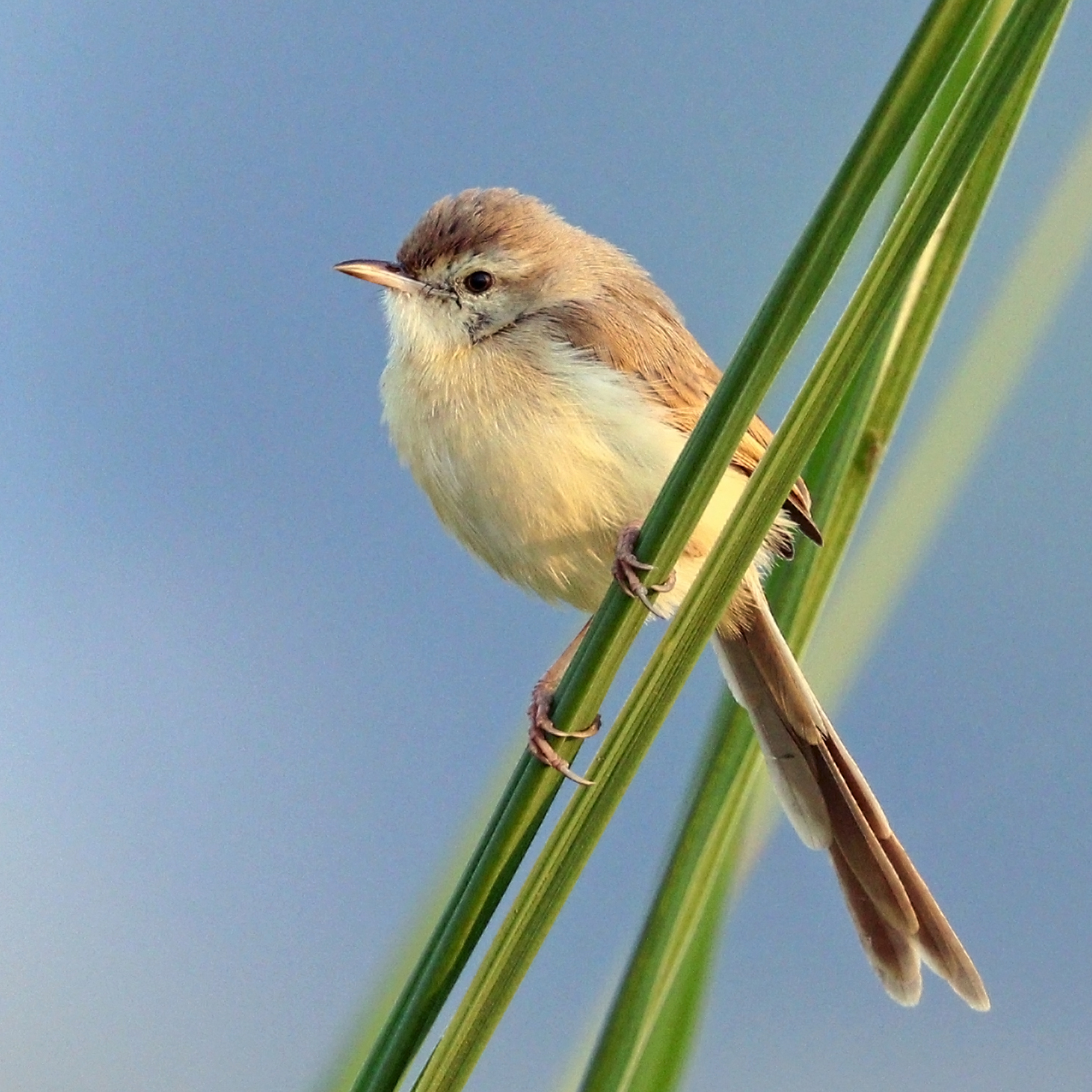
- P. i. inornata in winter Uttar Pradesh, India

Conservation status
- Least Concern (IUCN 3.1)

Scientific classification
- Kingdom: Animalia
- Phylum: Chordata
- Class: Aves
- Order: Passeriformes
- Family: Cisticolidae
- Genus: Prinia
- Species: P. inornata

Binomial name
- Prinia inornata Sykes, 1832
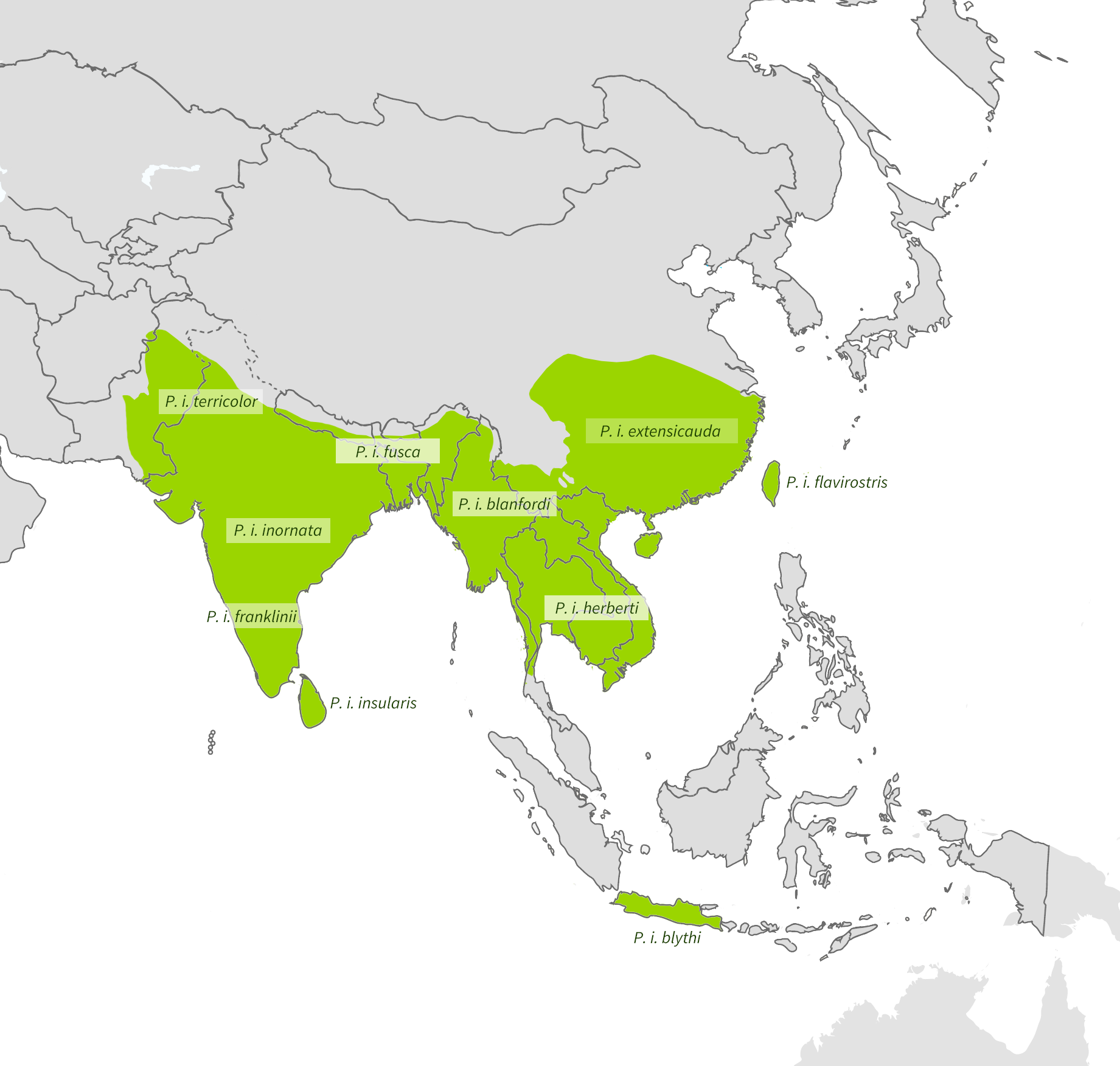
- Range of the subspecies

= Plain prinia =

Species of bird

The plain prinia (Prinia inornata), also known as the plain wren-warbler or white-browed wren-warbler, is a small cisticolid warbler found in Southeast Asia. It is a resident breeder from Pakistan and India to south China and southeast Asia. It was formerly included in the tawny-flanked prinia (Prinia subflava), resident in Africa south of the Sahara. The two are now usually considered to be separate species.

== Description ==
These 13–14-cm long warblers have short rounded wings, a longish tail, strong legs and a short black bill. In breeding plumage, adults are grey-brown above, with a short white supercilium and rufous fringes on the closed wings. The underparts are whitish-buff. The sexes are identical.

In winter, the upperparts are a warmer brown, and the underparts more buff. The tail is longer than in summer. There are a number of races differing in plumage shade. The endemic race in Sri Lanka retains summer plumage, including the shorter tail, all year round.

== Biology ==
This skulking passerine bird is typically found in wet lowland grassland, open woodland, scrub and sometimes gardens. The plain prinia builds its nest in a shrub or tall grass and lays three to six eggs. (The tawny-flanked prinia nests in herbage and lays two to four eggs.)

Like most warblers, the plain prinia is insectivorous. The song is a repetitive tlee-tlee-tlee.

== Gallery ==
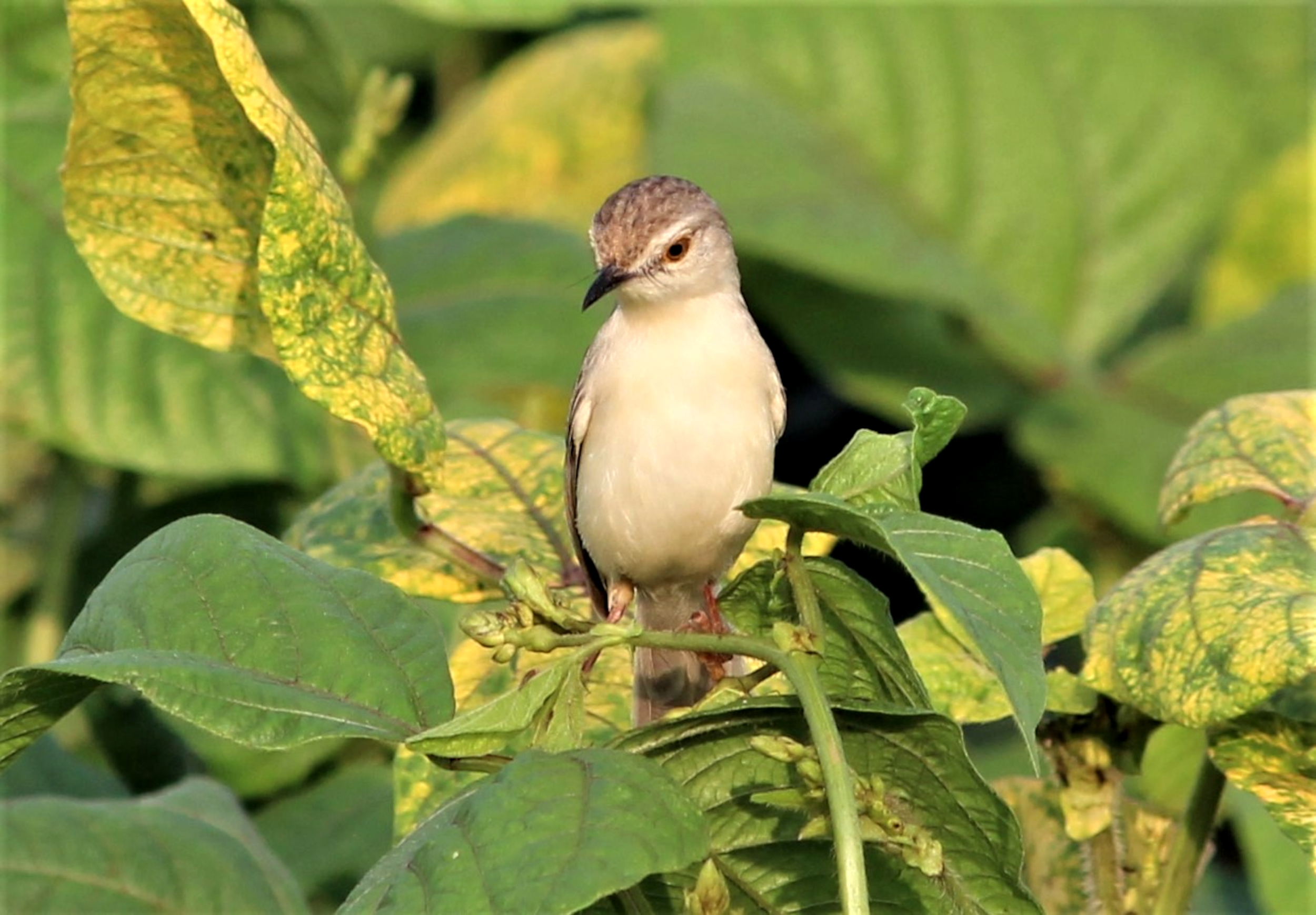
P. i. terricolor
Punjab, India

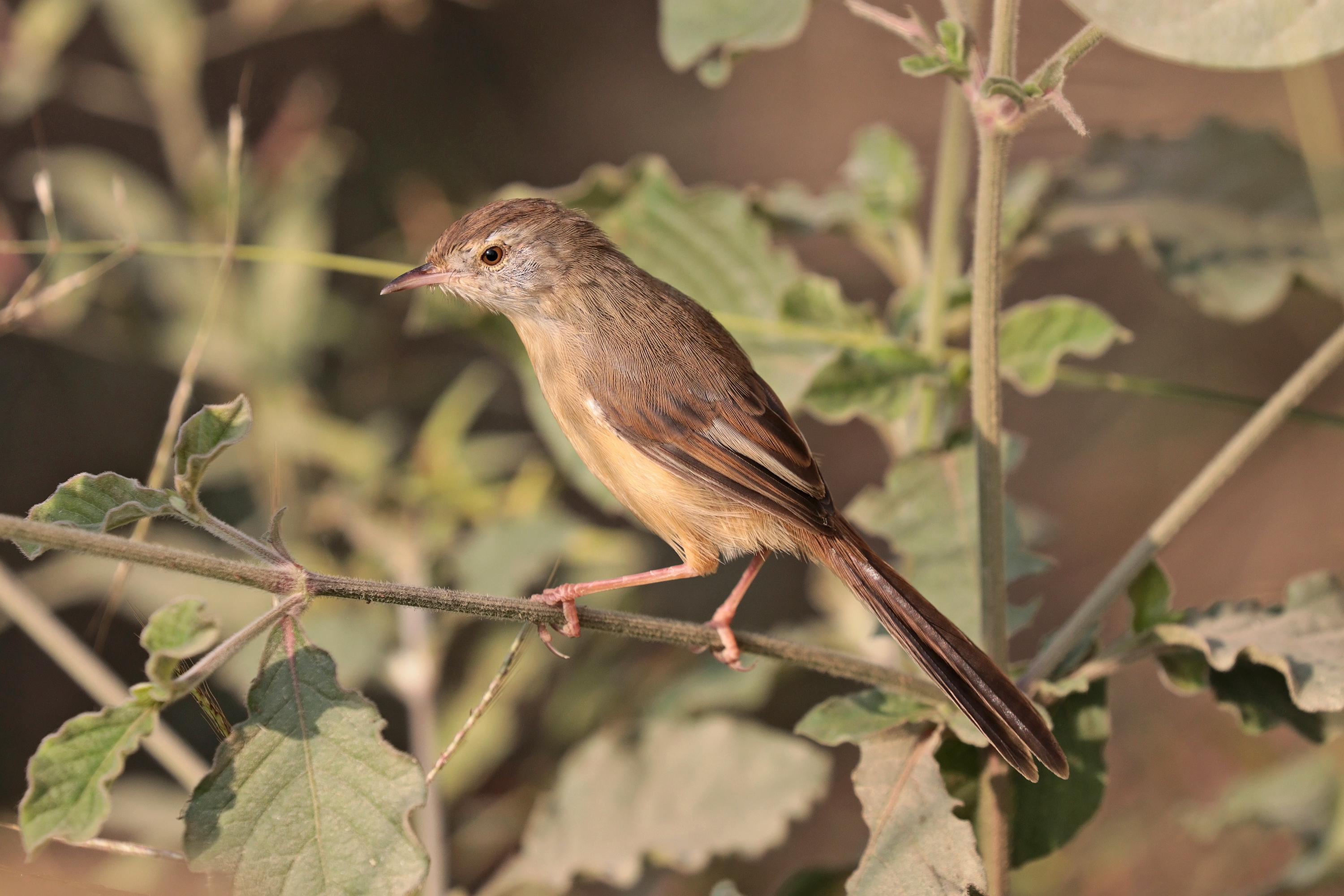
P. i. fusca
Nepalgunj, Nepal

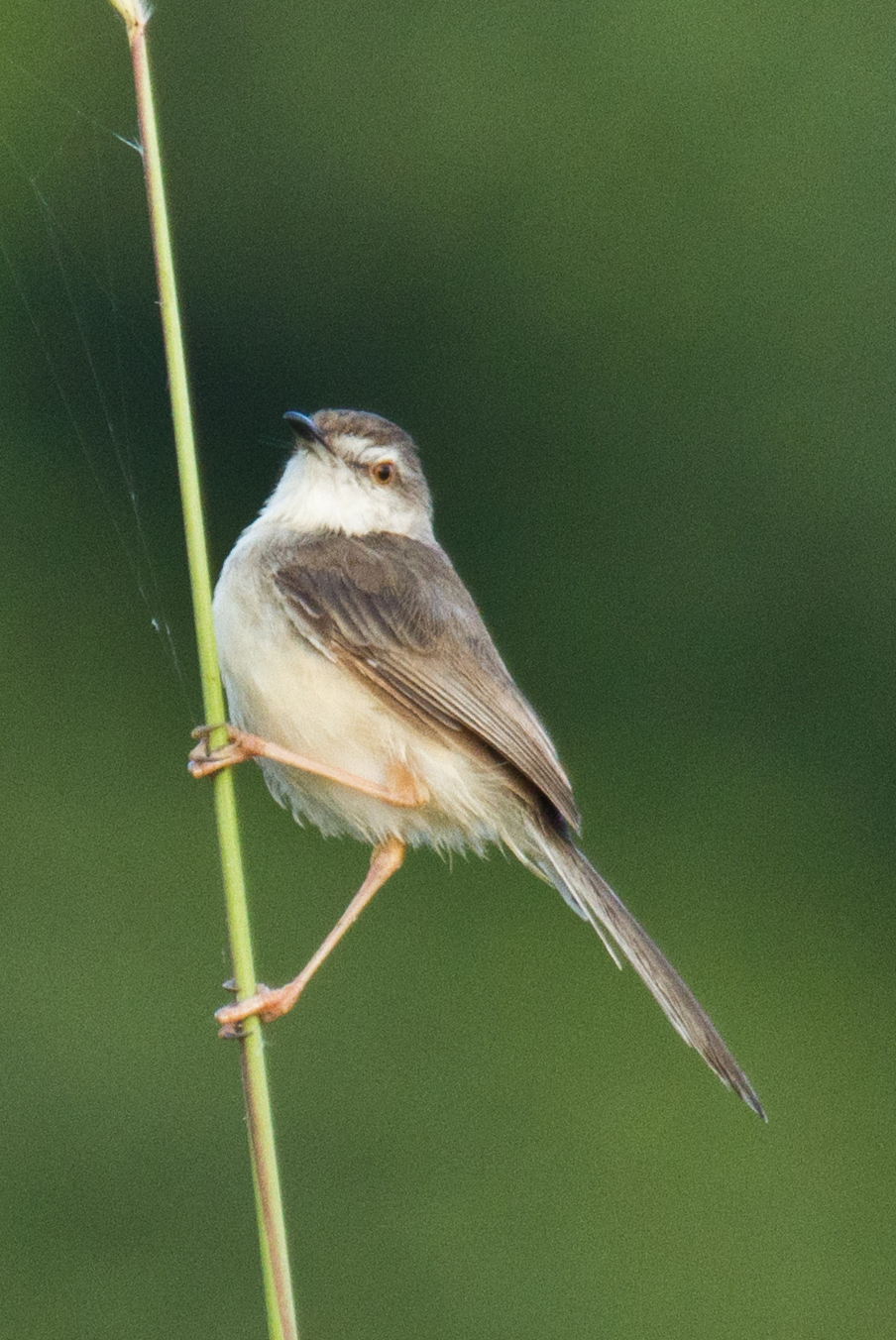
P. i. franklinii
Tamil Nadu, India

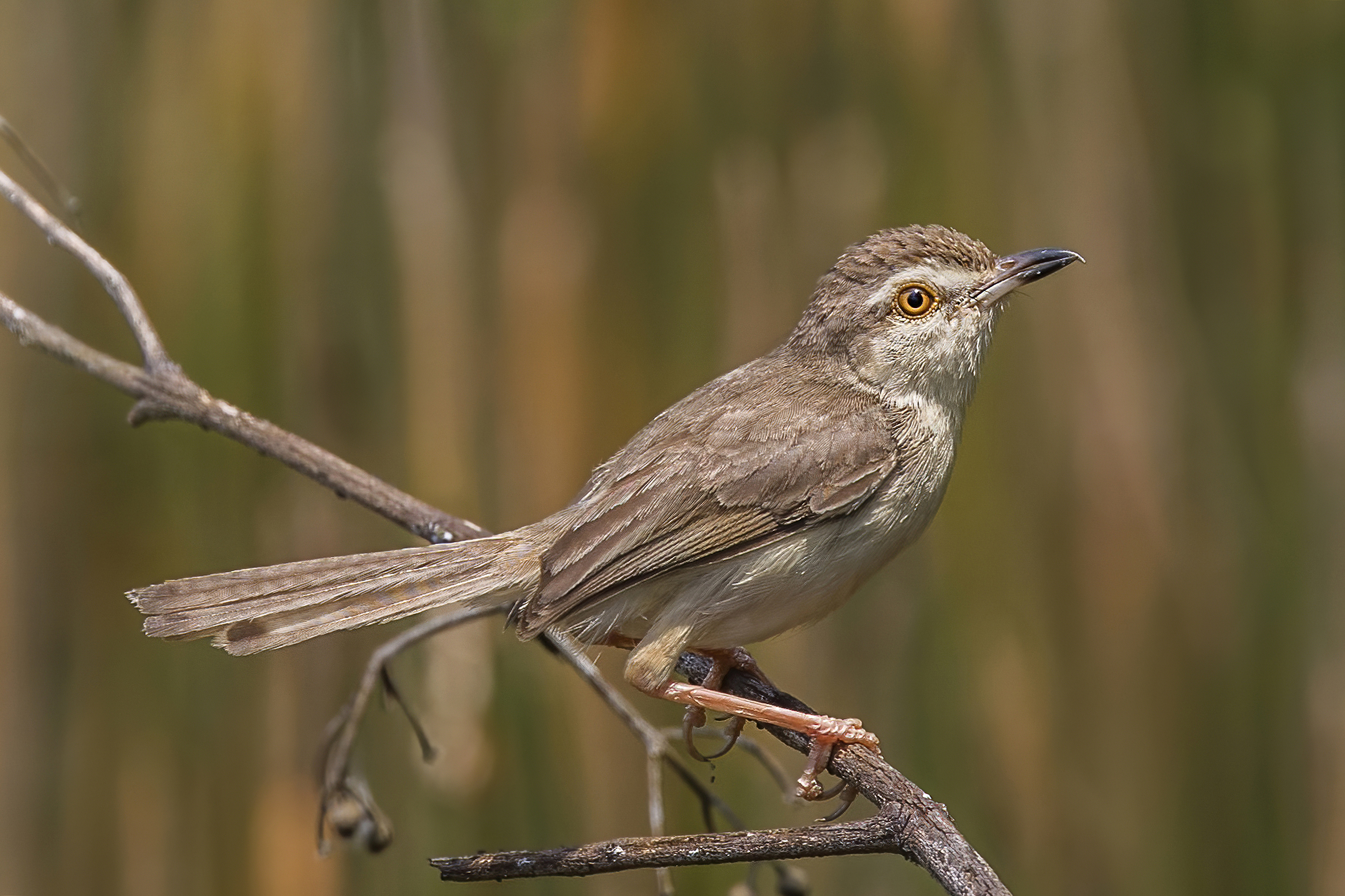
P. i. insularis
Sri Lanka

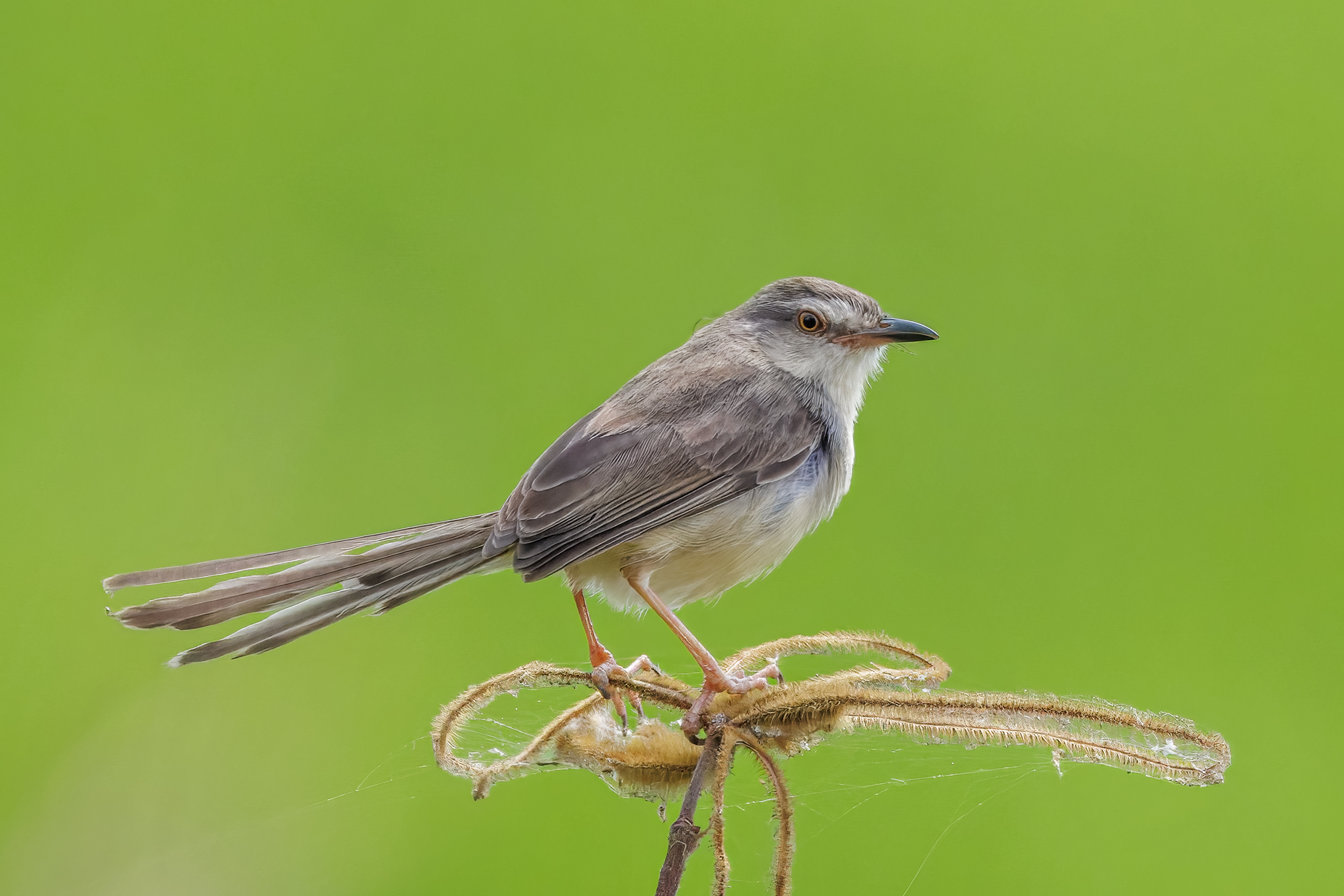
P. i. herberti
near Tonlé Sap, Cambodia

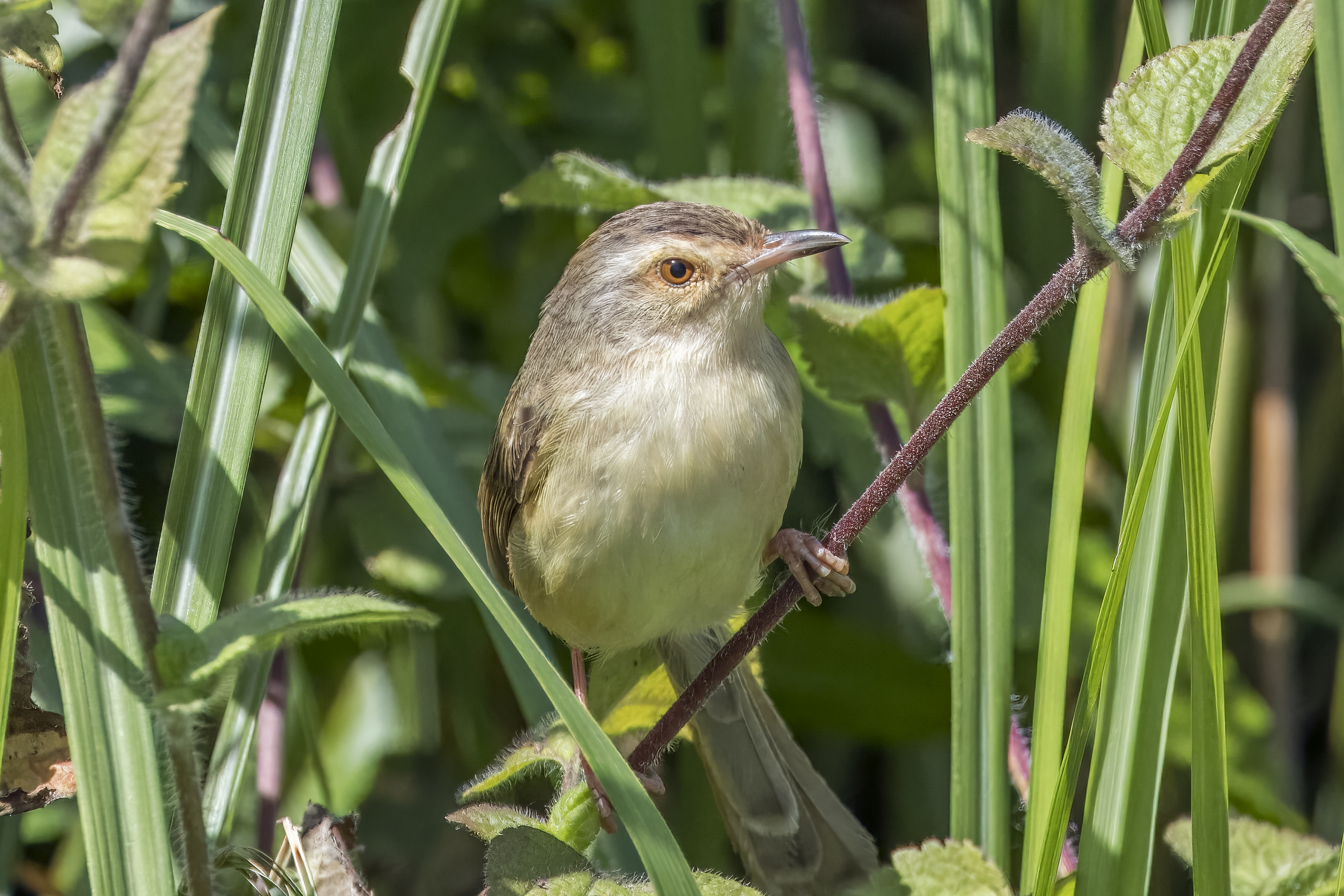
P. i. flavirostris
Taiwan
