= Palala River =

Lephalala River Palala River
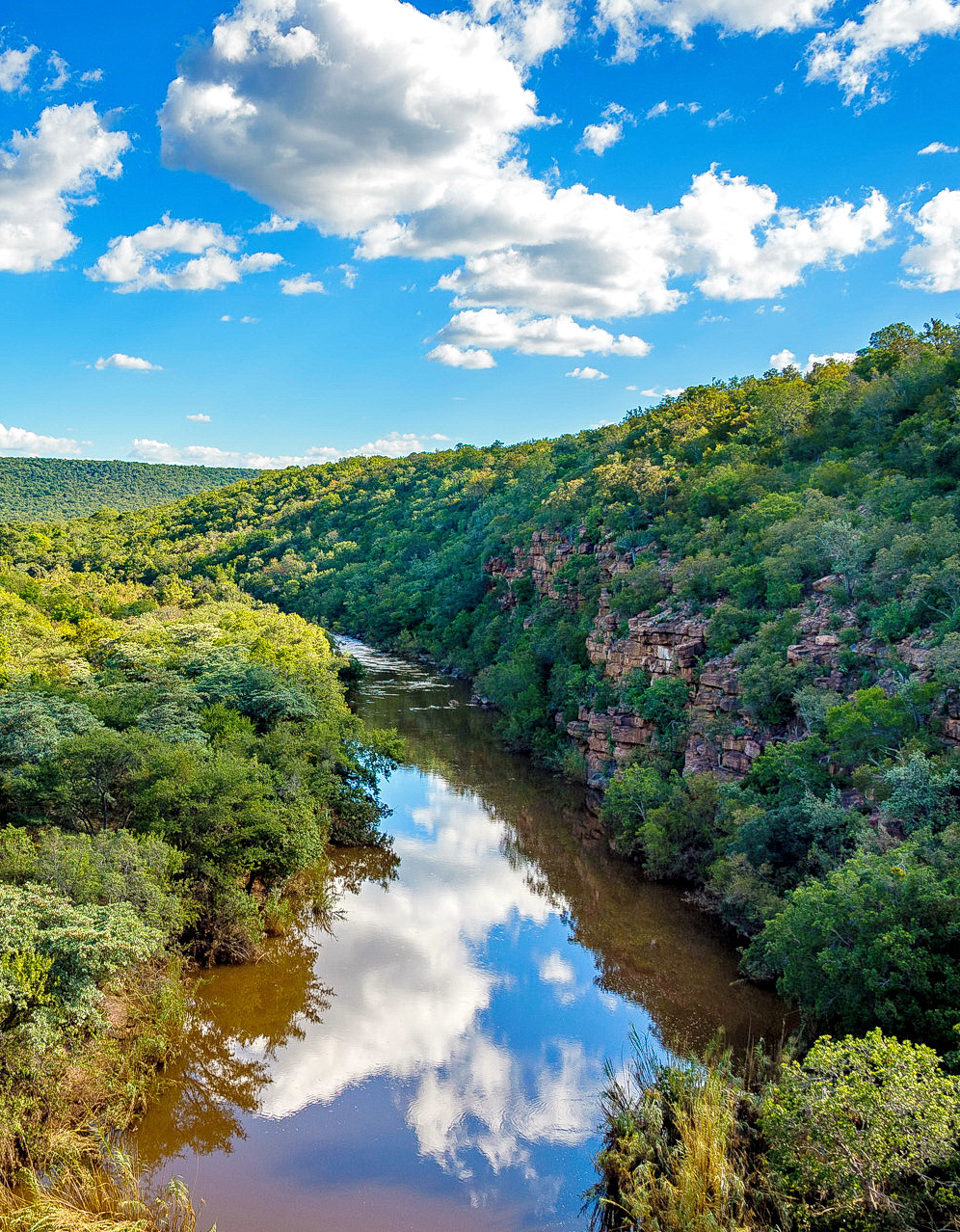
- Palala / Lephalala River gorge in Lapalala Wilderness, Waterberg, showing horizontal sandstone layering

- Location of the Lephalala River mouth
- Etymology: Name derived from Lephalale (Sotho), which means "one that inundates".

Location
- Country: South Africa
- State: Limpopo Province

Physical characteristics
- Source: Waterberg Massif
- Mouth
  - location: Limpopo River, South Africa/Botswana border
  - coordinates: 23°5′2″S 27°53′40″E
  - elevation: 788 m (2,585 ft)
- Basin size: 4,868 km^{2} (1,880 sq mi)

The Palala or Lephalala River, also called the Rhooebok-river by Thomas Baines, is a river in South Africa. This river's catchment basin is a sub-watershed of the Limpopo River.

It is a significant watercourse in the Waterberg area of Limpopo Province. The river drains much of the Lapalala Wilderness area and considerable additional lands that are important habitat for native wildlife in a zone with considerable ongoing bushveld restoration. The predominantly dry deciduous forest community of the upland portion of the Palala River watershed is home to many large African mammals including Blue Wildebeest, Giraffe, White Rhino and numerous bovids.

The Palala River has been shown to exhibit high water quality with very clear flowing waters, especially in the uppermost regions; correspondingly biotic health has been assessed as healthy using the North African catfish as a bio-marker. Interesting prehistoric rock paintings exist on bluffs along the river in the Lapalala Wilderness area.

== River biota ==
There are a variety of fauna that inhabit the Palala River including fish, Nile crocodile, African Rock Python and hippopotamus. In a 2004 study of the river's health, specimens of the North African catfish, Clarias gariepinus, were captured within reaches of the Lapalala Wilderness. A healthy population of male and female fish was found in the river's upper reaches within the Lapalala Wilderness, manifesting normal body mass averaging approximately 1.1 kilograms; moreover, this fish population from the higher reaches of the Palala River was found to be free of parasites and also free of liver damage. The health of the upper reaches was such that the upper Lapala was used in subsequent studies as the healthy control group to compare to other South African rivers which were more polluted from discharge of untreated sewage and agricultural wastes within their watersheds.

== Geology and hydrology ==
The rock strata through which the Palala River has incised comprise a substantial sequence, up to 3 000 metres in thickness in places, of fluvial arenaceous sediments derived from an ancient highland several hundred kilometres to the north-east, and deposited in an elongated, fault-bound basin during a period between 1 900 and 1 600 million years ago. The preservation of these un-deformed sandy strata, which include evidence of the first occurrence of free oxygen in the early Earth atmosphere, is due to their having been laid down on a remnant of the stable, primordial Kaapvaal craton, which has allowed them to remain almost unaltered and subject to little or no regional metamorphism despite their great age. Subsequent uplift of these sediments, collectively named the Waterberg Group, has resulted in their forming today a plateau, elevated in the south by as much as a thousand metres above the surrounding plains. If there were ever younger rocks deposited on top of the Waterberg strata in this region, no evidence remains of the fact. Beneath the thick sedimentary pile lie 2 100 million year-old sedimentary and igneous rocks which elsewhere may be found to host economic deposits of platinum, nickel, iron ore and tin; but no mineral deposits of any economic value have been, or are likely to be discovered in the well-travelled, winnowed Waterberg sediments.

The Waterberg plateau enjoys generally greater rainfall than is the average for the country as a whole, ranging from over 1000mm in the south to below 400mm in the north. The impermeable nature of the predominant sandstone strata, and its characteristic lack of substantial subterranean aquifers, means that most of the rainfall received across the plateau soon runs off rather than contributing to groundwater resources. Thus it is that the Waterberg is the source of four major perennial rivers, of which the Palala is the largest, all of them flowing eventually northwards into the Limpopo. The other major rivers are the Mogalakwena, the Mokolo and the Matlabas. The acidic nature of the sandstone results in acidic groundwater which leaches nutritious mineral content from the soils, rendering them for the most part low in fertility and poor in carrying capacity. Perhaps counter-intuitively, it is this low nutritive, dystrophic content of the soil that is largely responsible for the extremely high biodiversity that characterises the Waterberg plateau.

== Prehistoric rock paintings ==
Lapalala has thirteen known rock art sites, some close to the Lephalala River, and others near the Blocklands River. Several of the painted sites are in small rock shelters, others on sandstone boulders with smooth surfaces. Two distinct groups peopled the Waterberg in the last 1000 years and both groups were responsible for the art in Lapalala's reserve.

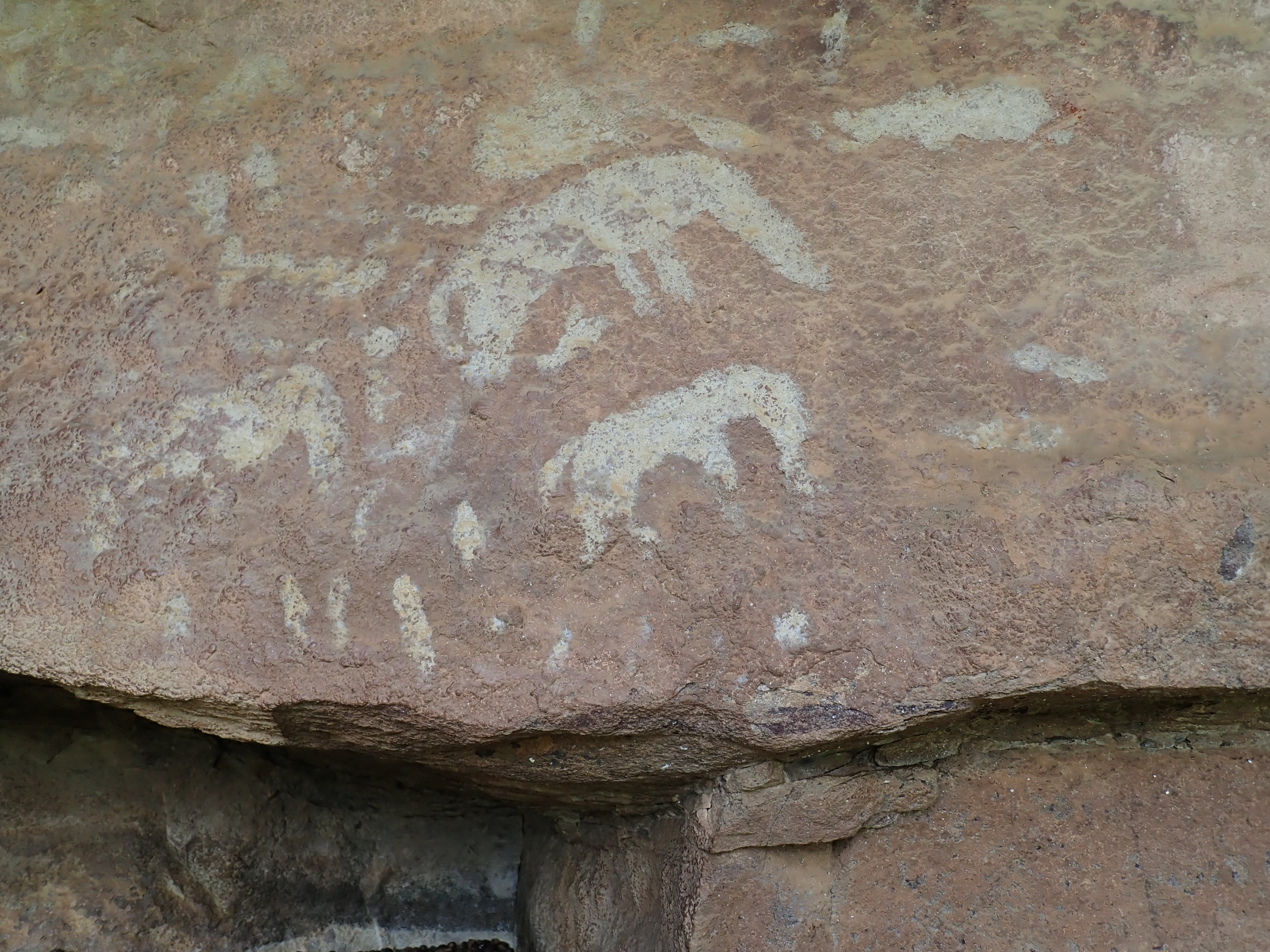
"Lapalala farmer art" at Lapalala Wilderness in South Africa.

Bushmen, who lived a mobile hunter-gatherer way of life, produced ‘fine-line’, well-drawn art, using brushes made from animal hair, and red and yellow paint from powdered, iron-rich rocks (ochre) mixed with liquids such as water, blood or fat. White paint derived from ash or clay, and this medium preserves badly compared to the red paint that soaks into the rock. Bushman art depicts a variety of antelope, in particular, hartebeest and kudu. The animals are sometimes realistically drawn and on other occasions the creature represented is an imaginative combination of hartebeest or kudu features with human attributes. This is because Bushman art is a religious expression and the artist was trying to convey beliefs about the spirit world, and experiences during altered states of consciousness by ‘healers’ in the community. The elongated human figures in the art are, for example, designed to explain the stretched feeling that a healer may experience while in trance.

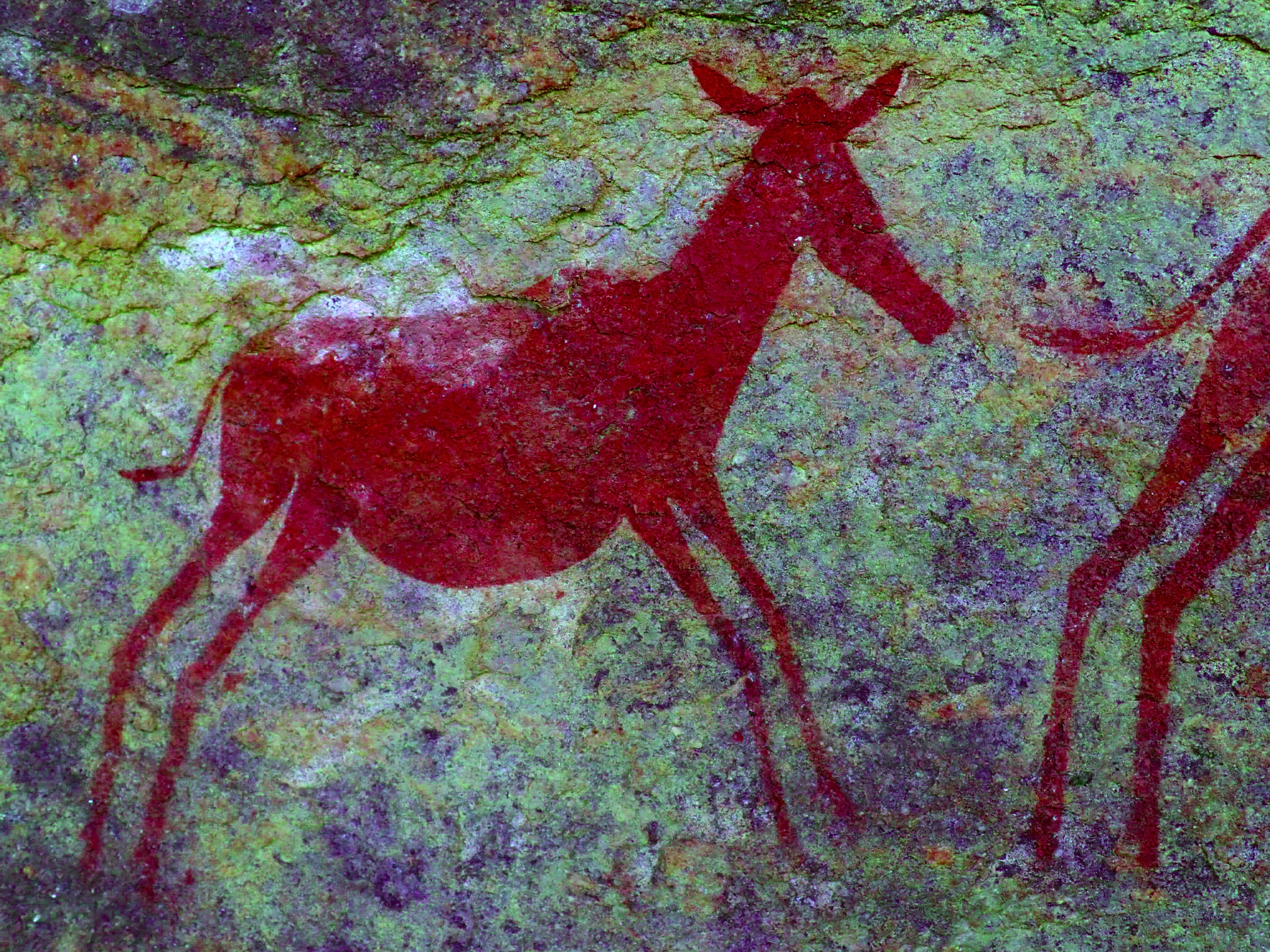
"Lapalala hartebeest" at Lapalala Wilderness in South Africa

The second group of people occupying Lapalala comprised Bantu-speaking, Iron Age farmers who settled in the valleys where dolerite provided fertile soils for their sorghum and millet crops, and where there was adequate grazing and water for cattle, sheep and goats. These people built semi-permanent villages and from about the 17th century, stone kraals became prominent features on Lapalala. The Iron Age farmers had elaborate initiation practices for boys at puberty and groups of boys would be isolated in remote places, like rock shelters, for as long as a month. During this time they would be circumcised and taught cultural beliefs. Amongst these, they would learn about animals representing specific regiments. The boys would then paint these animals on rock faces. They used their fingers dipped in white clay, so their paintings are mere approximations of animals and most often the species cannot be recognised. This ‘farmer’ art preserves badly.

People lived in Lapalala in the Middle Stone Age because stone tools predating 30,000 years ago can be found in several shelters. Thereafter there seems to have been a long gap in occupation and there is presently no evidence that people returned to Lapalala before about 1000 years ago.

== Waterberg Massif ==
Much of the Palala River course is through the Waterberg Biosphere, a massif of approximately 15,000 square kilometers. Waterberg is the first region in the northern part of South Africa to be named as a Biosphere Reserve by UNESCO. The extensive rock formation was shaped by hundreds of millions of years of riverine erosion to yield diverse bluff and butte landform. The ecosystem can be characterised as a dry deciduous forest or Bushveld. Within the Waterberg there are archaeological finds dating to the Stone Age, and nearby are early evolutionary finds related to the origin of humans.

== See also ==
- Drainage basin A
- List of rivers of South Africa
- Bushmen
- Rock painting
- Nile crocodile

== Sources ==
- Van der Ryst, M.M. (1998). The Waterberg Plateau in the Northern Province, Republic of South Africa, in the Later Stone Age. Cambridge Monographs in African Archaeology 43. BAR International Series 715. Oxford: BAR Publishing.
- Wadley, L.
- Wadley, R. (2020). Waterberg Echoes, Protea Boekhuis; First Edition (April 7, 2020), ISBN 978-1485309352
