= Mokolo River =

- Location of the Mokolo River mouth
- Etymology: Meaning "deep and silent" or "large flow" in the Tswana language.

Location
- Country: South Africa
- State: Limpopo Province

Physical characteristics
- Source: Waterberg Massif
- Source confluence: Confluence of the Sand River with the Grootspruit River
  - location: Near Alma
  - coordinates: 24°27′56″S 28°3′47″E
  - elevation: 1,202 m (3,944 ft)
- Mouth
  - location: Limpopo River, South Africa/Botswana border
  - coordinates: 23°13′55″S 27°43′10″E
  - elevation: 799 m (2,621 ft)
- Basin size: 8,387 km^{2} (3,238 sq mi)

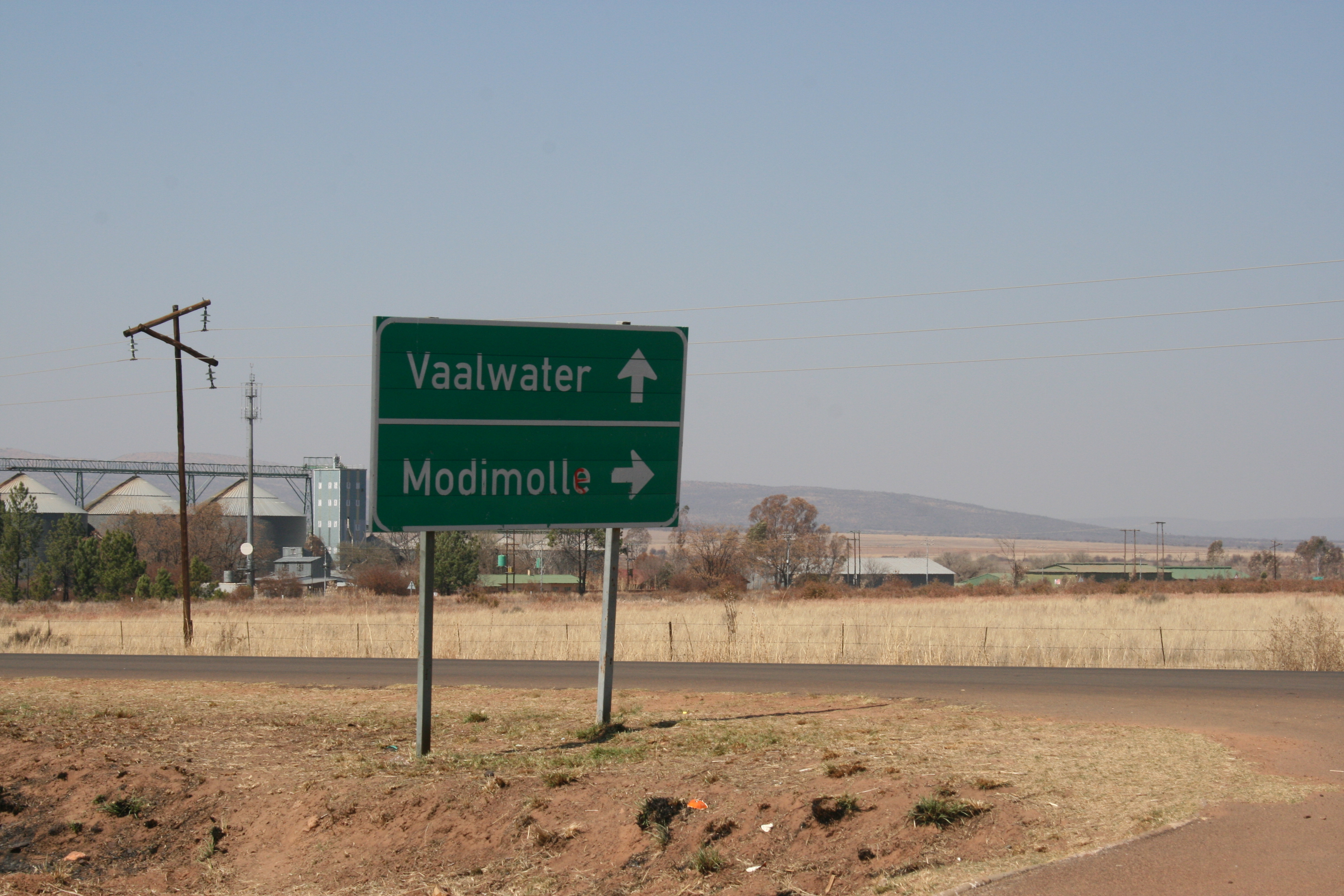
Road sign outside Laerskool Alma, close to the confluence that marks the beginning of the Mokolo River

The Mokolo River is a major watercourse in Limpopo Province of South Africa. This river collects much of the drainage of the Waterberg Massif and discharges it to the Limpopo River. The river's catchment area comprises 8,387 square kilometres (3,238 sq mi).

== Course ==
The Mokolo River and its upper course tributaries rise in the southwestern part of the Waterberg, between 1200 and 1600 metres above mean sea level. The Mokolo proper originates about 1.5 km north of Alma at the confluence of the Sand River with the Grootspruit River in a flattish, open area with numerous koppies. Shortly thereafter it flows northwards through a steep gorge emerging above the town of Vaalwater.

As it heads northwards it threads through the northern Waterberg, an extensive rock formation that was shaped by hundreds of millions of years of river erosion to yield diverse bluffs and buttes.

Then the river flows through the relatively flat area of the lowveld until it enters the Mokolo Dam. From there, it flows through another gorge before entering the Limpopo Plain, near the junction with the Rietspruit. From this point, the Mokolo River flows through flat sandy areas until it reaches the Limpopo's eastern bank.

=== Tributaries and dams ===
The most important tributaries of the Mokolo are: Sand River (whose uppermost section is named 'Little Nyl'), Klein Sand River, Sandspruit, Sondagsloop, Loubadspruit, Grootspruit, Sterkstroom, Brakspruit, Malmanies, Bulspruit, Rietspruit, Sandloop, Poer se Loop and the Tambotie River.

The Mokolo Dam is the only large dam in the system.

== Ecology ==
Approximately 87 percent of the river's water use is for agriculture. Some wetlands rehabilitation in the upper Mokolo has been carried out and that effort has been deemed a success. The Mokolo Dam Nature Reserve is located by the eastern and southern sides of the Mokolo Dam reservoir.

The highest concentration of hippopotamus in the Limpopo River is found between the mouths of the Mokolo and the Mogalakwena Rivers.

== See also ==
- Drainage basin A
- List of rivers of South Africa
- Bushveld
- Water Management Areas
