= Letaba Ranch Provincial Park =

Protected area in Limpopo, South Africa

- Location within Limpopo Location within South Africa
- Location: Limpopo, South Africa
- Nearest city: Phalaborwa
- Coordinates: 23°43′48″S 31°05′08″E
- Area: 42,000 ha (100,000 acres)
- Governing body: Limpopo Tourism and Parks Board

Letaba Ranch Provincial Park, is a protected area in Limpopo Province, South Africa. It is located north of Phalaborwa, next to the Kruger Park (border unfenced), and has an area of about 42,000 ha. The Great Letaba River, runs through the park.

== Wildlife ==
Including: African bush elephant, African buffalo, crocodile, kudu, hippo, African wild dog and South African giraffe.

== Safari Camp ==
Letaba Ranch has only one safari camp located in the reserve, Mtomeni Safari Camp. The camp is unfenced and situated on the banks of the Great Letaba River.

== See also ==
- Balule Nature Reserve
- Klaserie Game Reserve
- Timbavati Game Reserve
- Protected areas of South Africa
