= Mokolo Dam =

- Interactive map of Mokolo Dam
- Official name: Mokolo Dam
- Location: Limpopo, South Africa
- Coordinates: 23°58′30″S 27°43′1″E
- Opening date: 1980
- Operator: Department of Water Affairs

Dam and spillways
- Type of dam: rockfill
- Impounds: Mokolo River
- Height: 55 metres (180 ft)
- Length: 525 metres (1,722 ft)

Reservoir
- Creates: Mokolo Dam Reservoir
- Total capacity: 146,000,000 cubic metres (5.2×10^{9} cu ft)
- Surface area: 828.8 hectares (2,048 acres)

Mokolo Dam (previously known as the Hans Strijdom Dam) is a rock-fill type dam located on the Mokolo River, near Lephalale, Limpopo, South Africa. It was established in 1980. The Malmanies River and the Bulspruit River, two tributaries of the Mokolo, also enter the dam from its left side. The dam supplies water to Lephalale town. The dam mainly serves for municipal and industrial purposes and its hazard potentials has been ranked high (3).

The dam supplies the Lephalale area, Grootgeluk coal mine, Matimba power station and part of the water requirements of Medupi power station.

The Mokolo Dam Nature Reserve is located by the eastern and southern sides of the dam. The shoreline of the dam is heavily infested with Phragmites reeds.

== See also ==
- List of reservoirs and dams in South Africa
- List of rivers of South Africa
