= Thaba Meetse =

Protected area in Limpopo, South Africa

The Thaba Meetse private game reserve is situated in the Limpopo Province of South Africa.

It is the first region in the northern part of South Africa to be named as a biosphere reserve by UNESCO, and features game including giraffe, zebra, blue wildebeest, common eland, impala, kudu, red hartebeest, waterbuck, nyala, ostrich, leopard, cheetah, caracal, and warthog.
