= Waterberg Biosphere =

Biosphere reserve in South Africa

Waterberg
- Thaba Meetse
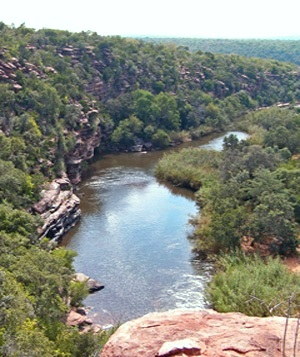
- River gorge in the Lapalala Wilderness of the Waterberg showing horizontal sandstone layering

Highest point
- Peak: Geelhoutkop
- Elevation: 1,830 m (6,000 ft)
- Listing: List of mountain ranges of South Africa
- Coordinates: 24°4′30″S 28°8′30″E

Dimensions
- Length: 170 km (110 mi) NE/SW
- Width: 80 km (50 mi) NW/SE

Geography
- Location within South Africa
- Location: near Vaalwater
- Country: South Africa
- Province: Limpopo

Geology
- Orogeny: Kaapvaal craton
- Rock age: Neoarchean to early Paleoproterozoic
- Rock type(s): Bushveld Igneous Complex, sandstone

Climbing
- Easiest route: From the towns of Vaalwater or Bela-Bela

The Waterberg (Northern Sotho: Thaba Meetse) is a mountainous massif of approximately 654,033 hectare in north Limpopo Province, South Africa. The average height of the mountain range is 600 m with a few peaks rising up to 2,000 m above sea level. Vaalwater town is located just north of the mountain range. The extensive rock formation was shaped by hundreds of millions of years of riverine erosion to yield diverse bluff and butte landform. The ecosystem can be characterised as a dry deciduous forest or Bushveld. Within the Waterberg there are archaeological finds dating to the Stone Age, and nearby are early evolutionary finds related to the origin of humans.

Waterberg (Thaba Meetse) is the first region in the northern part of South Africa to be named as a Biosphere Reserve by UNESCO.

== Geology ==
The underlying rock formation derives from the Kaapvaal craton, formed as a precursor island roughly 2.7 billion years ago. This crustal formation became the base of the Waterberg, which was further transformed by upward extrusion of igneous rocks. These extruded rocks, containing minerals such as vanadium and platinum, are called the Bushveld Igneous Complex. The original extent of this rock upthrust involved about 250,000 square kilometres, and is sometimes called the Waterberg Supergroup.

Sedimentary deposition from rivers cutting through Waterberg endured until roughly 1.5 billion years ago. In more recent time (around 250 million years ago) the Kaapvaal craton collided with the supercontinent Gondwana, and split Gondwana into its modern-day continents. Waterberg today contains mesas, buttes and some kopje outcrops. Some of cliffs stand up to 550 meters above the plains, with exposed multi-coloured sandstone.

== History ==
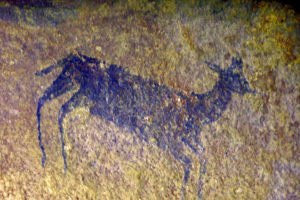
Bushman Stone Age rock painting, Lapalala Wilderness, Waterberg, South Africa.

The sandstone formations could retain groundwater sufficient to make a suitable environment for primitive man. The cliff overhangs offered natural shelters for these early humans. The first human ancestors may have been at Waterberg as early as three million years ago, since Makapansgat, 40 kilometres distant, has yielded skeletons of Australopithecus africanus. Hogan suggests that Homo erectus, whose evidence remains were also discovered in Makapansgat, "may have purposefully moved into the higher areas of the Waterberg for summer (December to March) game".

Bushmen entered Waterberg around two thousand years ago. They produced rock paintings at Lapalala within the Waterberg, including depictions of rhinoceros and antelope. Early Iron Age settlers in Waterberg were Bantu, who had brought cattle to the region. The Bantu created a problem in Waterberg, since cattle reduced grassland caused invasion of brush species leading to an outbreak of the tsetse fly. The ensuing epidemic of sleeping sickness depopulated the plains, but at higher elevations man survived, because the fly cannot survive above 600 meters.

Later people left the first Stone Age artefacts recovered in northern South Africa. Starting about the year 1300 AD, Nguni settlers arrived with new technologies, including the ability to build dry-stone walls, which techniques were then used to add defensive works to their Iron Age forts, some of which walls survive to today. Archaeologists continue to excavate Waterberg to shed light on the Nguni culture and the associated dry-stone architecture.

The first white settlers arrived in Waterberg in 1808 and the first naturalist a Swede appeared just before mid 19th century. Around the mid 19th century, a group of Afrikaner travellers set out from Cape Town in search of Jerusalem. Arriving in Waterberg, they mis-estimated their distance and thought they had reached Egypt.

After battles between Boer settlers and tribesmen, the races co-existed until around 1900. The Boers brought further cattle grazing, multiplying the impacts of indigenous tribes. By the beginning of the 20th century there were an estimated 200 western inhabitants of the Waterberg, and grassland loss began to have a severe impact upon native wildlife populations.

== Ecology ==
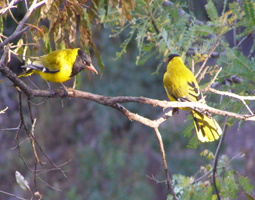
Male and female Black-headed orioles in courtship ritual, riparian zone of central Waterberg, South Africa

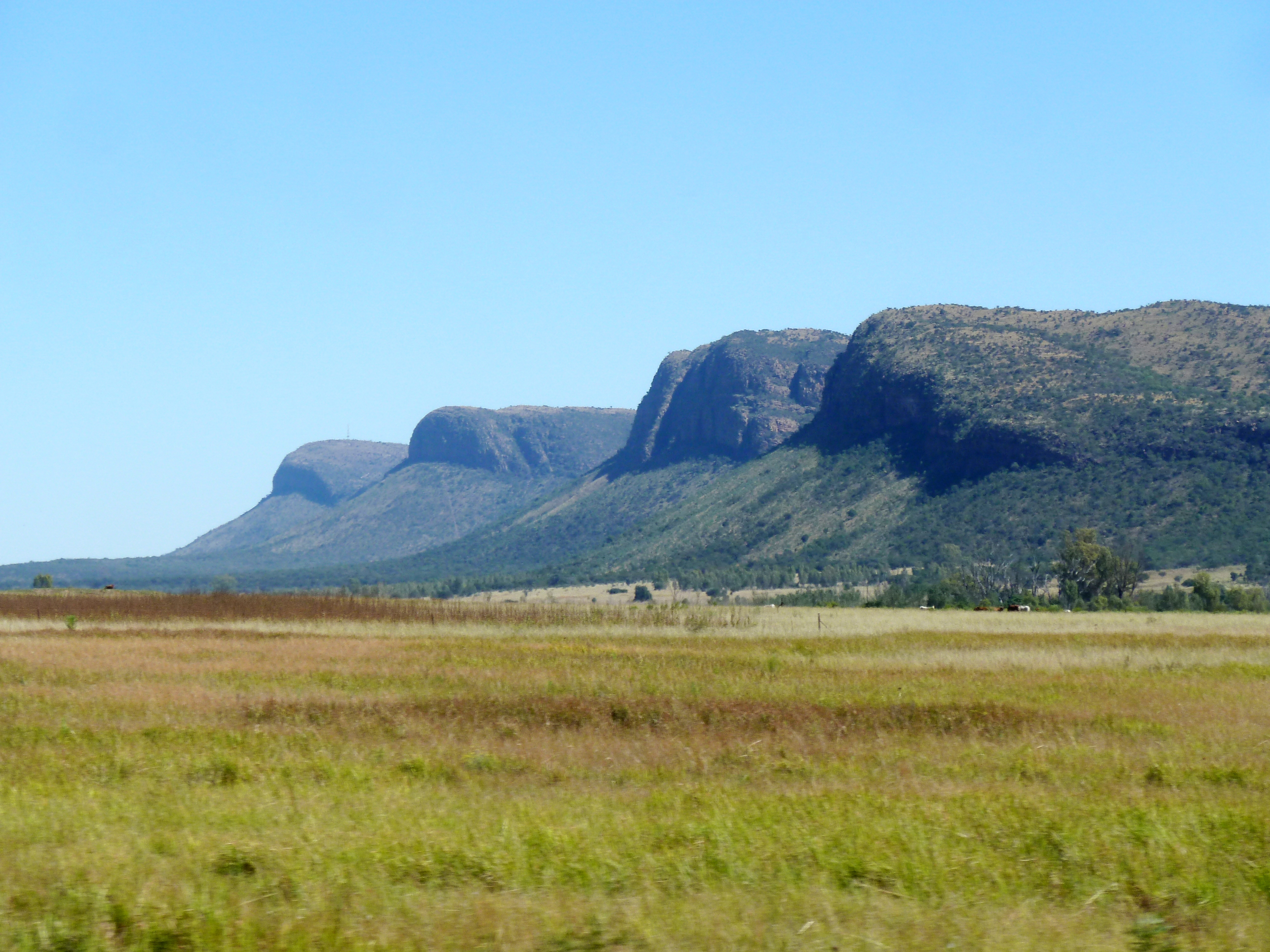
The Sandrivier range near Vaalwater constitutes one section of the Waterberg escarpment. It consists of coarse grained, yellow, cross-bedded sandstone.

There are several sub-habitats within the Waterberg Biosphere, which is fundamentally a dry deciduous forest; according to Hogan: "These sub-habitats include high plateau savanna, specialized shaded cliff vegetation system and riparian zone habitat with associated marshes".

=== Flora and fauna ===
The savanna consists of rolling grasslands and a semi-deciduous forest, with trees such as mountain syringa, silver cluster-leaf and lavender tree. The canopy is mostly leafless during the dry winter. Native grasses include signal grass, goose grass and heather-topped grass. Indigenous grasses provide graze to support native species including impala, kudu, klipspringer and blue wildebeest. Some Pachypodium habitats are found especially in isolated kopje formations.

Other indigenous mammals include giraffe, white rhinoceros and warthog. Snakes include the black mamba and spitting cobra. In 1905 Eugene Marais studied these snakes of the Waterberg. Some birds seen are the black-headed oriole and the white-backed vulture. Predators include the leopard, hyena and lion.

Vegetative cliff habitats are abundant in the Waterberg due to the extensive historic riverine erosion. The African porcupine uses the protection of these cliffside caves. Some trees cling to the cliff areas, including the paperbark false-thorn, that have flaking bark hanging from their thick trunks. Another tree in this habitat is the fever tree, thought by Bushmen to have special power to allow communication with the dead. It is found on cliffs above the Palala River including one site used for prehistoric ceremonies, which is also a location of some intact rock paintings.

Riparian zones are associated with various rivers that cut through Waterberg. These surface waters all drain to the Limpopo River which flows easterly to discharge into the Indian Ocean. The river bushwillow is a riparian tree in this habitat. These riparian zones offer habitat for birds, reptiles and mammals that require more water than plateau species. The riverine areas are inhabited by the apex predator Nile crocodile and the hippopotamus. These wet habitats have reduced numbers of water-living insects, and the Waterberg is thus considered an almost malaria-free region.

== Land management ==
As of 2006 about 80,000 people lived on the Waterberg plateau, which is part of the Bushveld district of Limpopo Province of South Africa. After cattle grazing wrought ecological havoc in the mid 1900s, the land owners of the region became aware of the benefits of restoring habitat to attract and protect the original species of antelope, white rhino, giraffe, hippopotami, and other species whose numbers dropped in the era of intense cattle grazing.

The rise in eco-tourism has stimulated interest in soil conservation practices to restore original grass species to the Waterberg. The land management practises required are expensive, but repay the landowner with added value in wildlife habitat. There is also a trend for larger farms and open space areas with the resultant advantage of fence removal. This outcome not only benefits large mammal migration, but yields an improved gene pool.

== Protected areas ==
Waterberg Biosphere Reserve
- Location within South Africa
- Interactive map of Waterberg Biosphere Reserve
- Location: Limpopo, South Africa
- Nearest city: Lephalale
- Coordinates: 23°55′S 28°05′E
- Area: 654,033 ha (1,616,150 acres)
- Established: 2001; 25 years ago
- Governing body: Waterberg Biosphere Reserve
- Website: https://waterbergbiosphere.com/

=== UNESCO Waterberg Biosphere Reserve ===
The Waterberg Biosphere Reserve was designated in 2001. It has a total area of 654 033 hectares. Marakele National Park is found on the western edge of the biosphere reserve.

The Welgevonden Game Reserve covers 37,500 hectares of the plateau. The Kololo Game Reserve covers 3000 hectares, part of which is in the Welgevonden Private Game Reserve, and part of which is completely protected.

The Lapalala Wilderness Nature Reserve, just north of Melkrivier covers approximately 48’000 hectares and is the largest private game reserve in the Waterberg and the Limpopo province.

== See also ==
- Boer Wars
- Soil conservation
- List of mountain ranges of South Africa
