= Vaalwater =

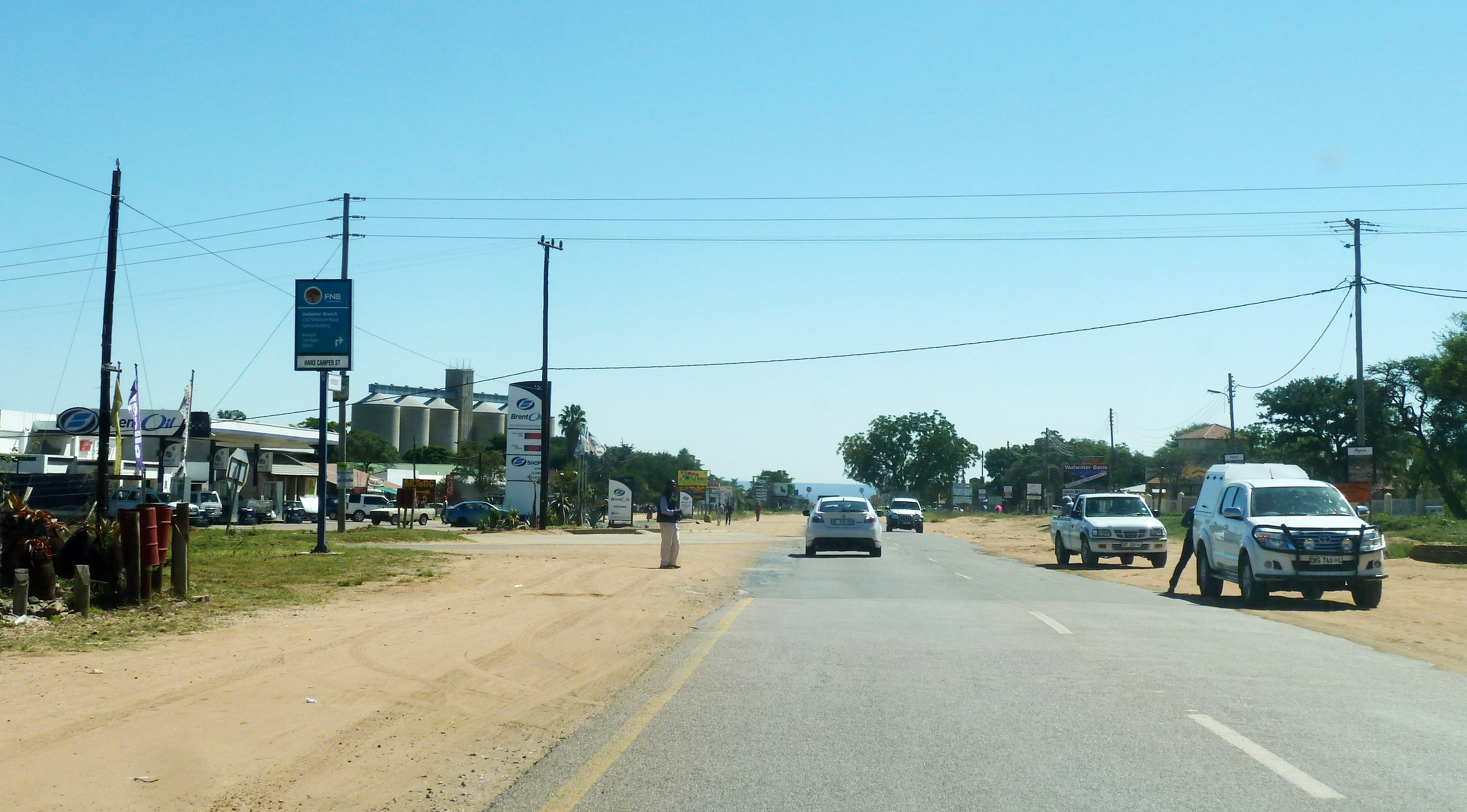
- R33 in Vaalwater

- Location within Limpopo Location within South Africa
- Coordinates: 24°17′S 28°6′E
- Country: South Africa
- Province: Limpopo
- District: Waterberg
- Municipality: Modimolle–Mookgophong

Area
  - Total: 10.51 km^{2} (4.06 sq mi)

Population (2011)
  - Total: 3,964
  - Density: 377.2/km^{2} (976.9/sq mi)

Racial makeup (2011)
  - Black African: 87.4%
  - Coloured: 0%
  - Indian: 0.25%
  - White: 12%

First languages (2011)
  - Sepedi: 64.3%
  - Afrikaans: 11.3%
  - Tsonga: 7,9%
- Time zone: UTC+2 (SAST)
- PO box: 8888
- Area code: 014

Vaalwater is a small town situated on the Mokolo River in the Limpopo province of South Africa.

== Geography ==
=== Location ===
Nearby towns also include Hermanusdorings, Melkrivier, Palala and Naboomspruit.

=== Geography ===
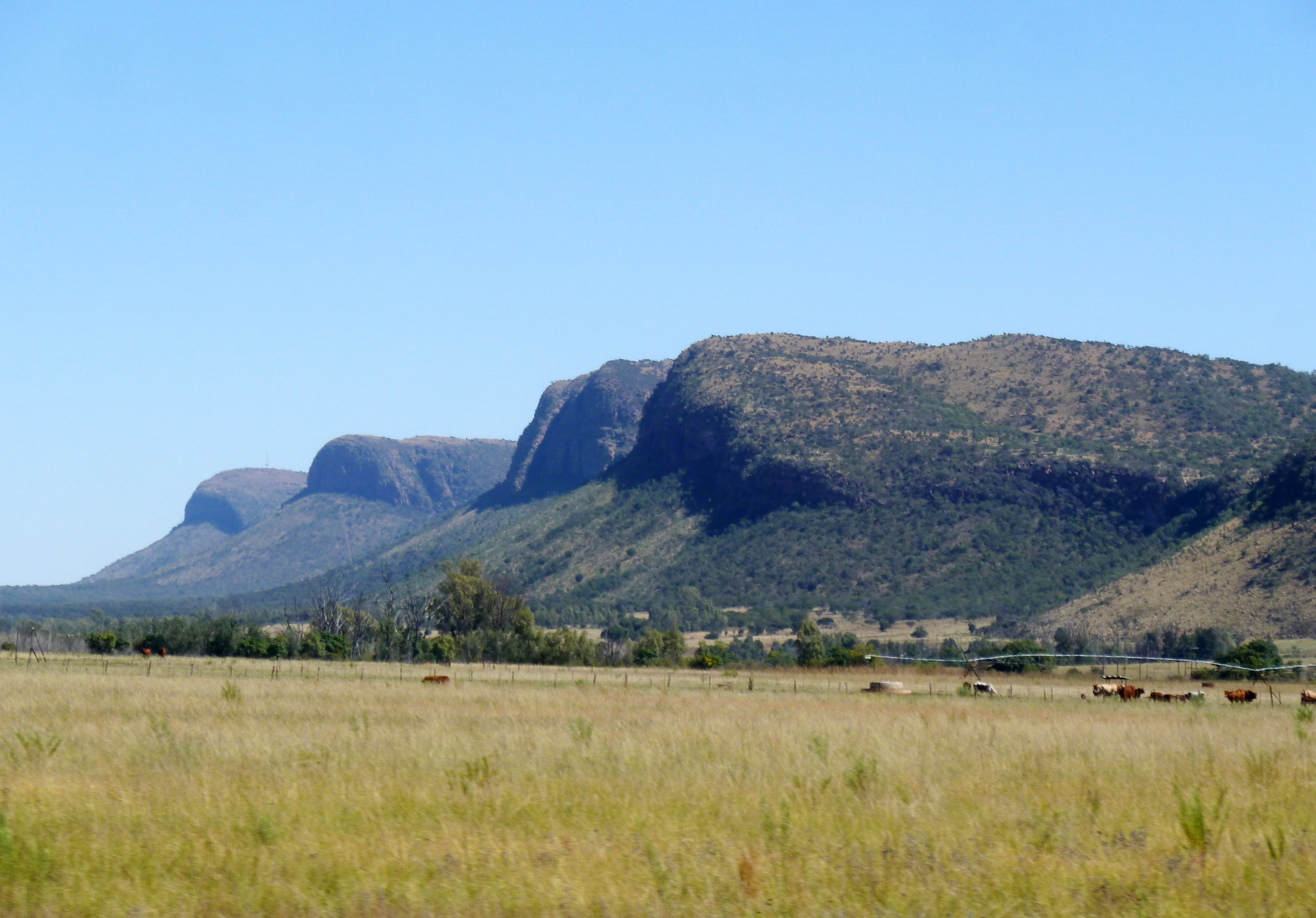
Sandrivier range of the central Waterberg, 15 km south of Vaalwater

Vaalwater lies at the southern edge of the rugged Waterberg Massif, which is a biosphere that contains considerable biodiversity, including numerous large mammals (e.g. Giraffe, White Rhino, Blue Wildebeest). Waterberg is the first region in the northern part of South Africa to be named as a Biosphere Reserve by UNESCO. The extensive rock formation was shaped by hundreds of millions of years of riverine erosion to yield diverse bluff and butte landform.

== Economy ==
=== Tourism ===
Vaalwater is a popular jumping-off point for travels to the Waterberg Massif and Botswana and is itself becoming a minor destination for tourism, with a variety of craft, art, and gift shops, as well as cafes and restaurants. Vaalwater is also home to some of the largest game farms and eco-tourism in South Africa given surrounding mountains and wildlife. Many of the game farms advertise the Big Five.

=== Services ===
Vaalwater has a number of commercial services which are uncommon for many kilometers in the surrounding area, especially on roads leading to Botswana. These include banks, grocery stores, petrol and diesel, a post office, and doctors.

== Name ==
In 2006, Vaalwater was officially renamed Mabatlane, but reverted to Vaalwater in 2007 after it became evident that the proper renaming procedures had not been followed.
