= Lapalala Wilderness =

Conservation area in South Africa

- Lapalala Nature Reserve
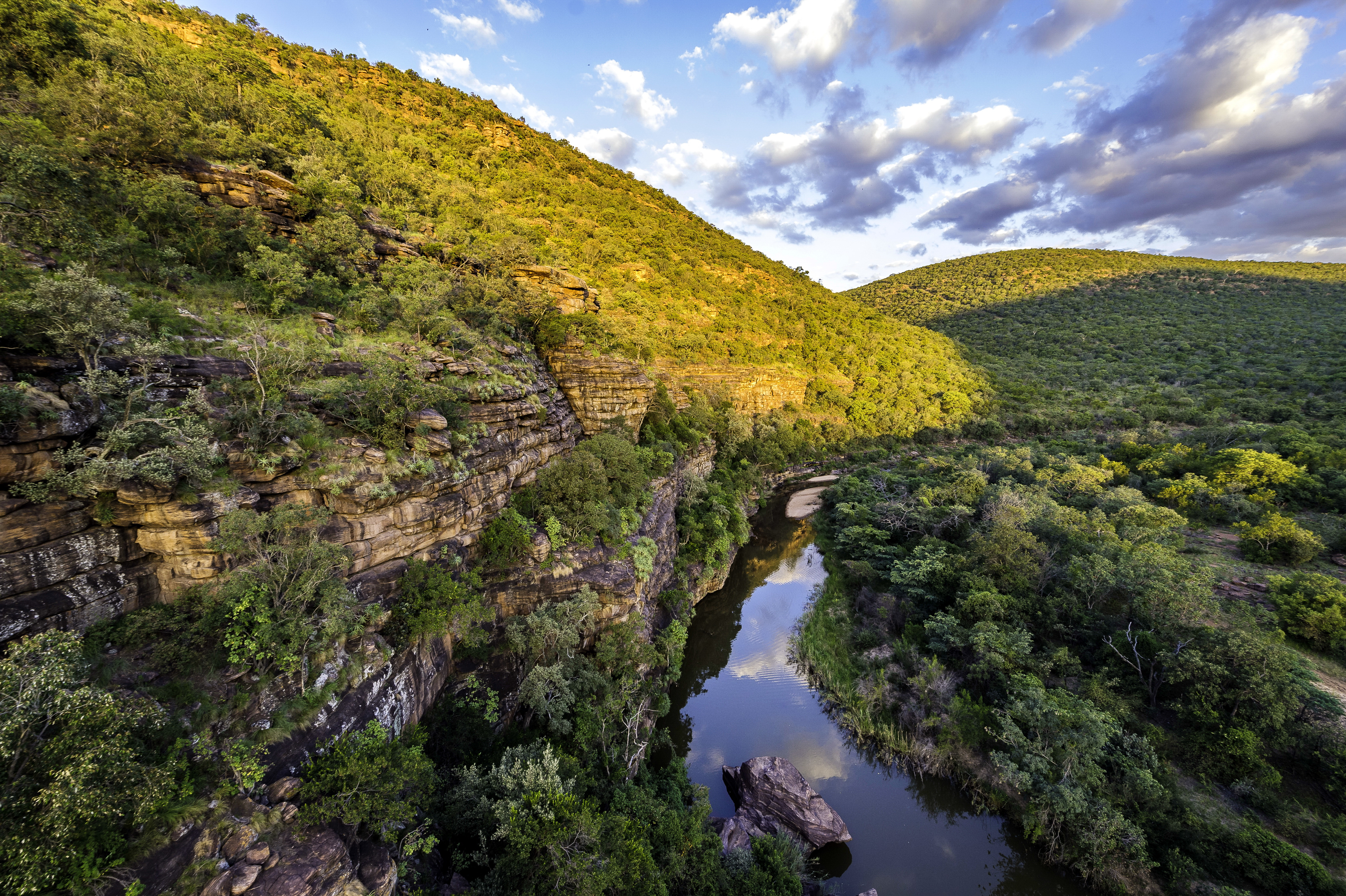
- Lapalala Wilderness, South Africa

- Location within South Africa
- Location: Limpopo
- Nearest city: Polokwane, South Africa
- Coordinates: 23.8422°S 28.3663°E
- Area: 48,000 ha (190 sq mi)
- Established: 1981
- Operator: Lapalala Wilderness Foundation

Lapalala Wilderness is a 48,000 hectare Big 5 conservation area situated within the UNESCO declared Waterberg Biosphere and protected under the National Environmental Management Protected Areas Act of 57 of 2003.

The Palala and Blocklands rivers flow through Lapalala for over 60 km and are identified as National Freshwater Ecosystem Priority Areas. The landscape forms part of the Central Bushveld Biome.

Eight different types of land have been identified in the reserve, which is an indicator of heterogeneity, and thus the diversity of Lapalala habitats. Its vegetation ranges from grasslands and sparse woody vegetation to dense woodlands with high diversity of woody plant species. The diversity of habitats and long-term conservation is attractive to a large number of birds and wildlife. It was the first privately protected area in South Africa to reintroduce black rhinoceros in 1981.

Lapalala Wilderness School was established in 1985 with the aim of promoting wildlife conservation among young people – often from historically disadvantaged communities. The school is today widely recognised as a centre of excellence for its environmental education programmes, which include teacher training, internships, and outreach programmes. Brand-new, eco-friendly facilities were officially opened in 2022.

== See also ==
- Prehistoric rock paintings
- Blue Wildebeest
