= Balule Nature Reserve =

Protected area in Limpopo Province, South Africa

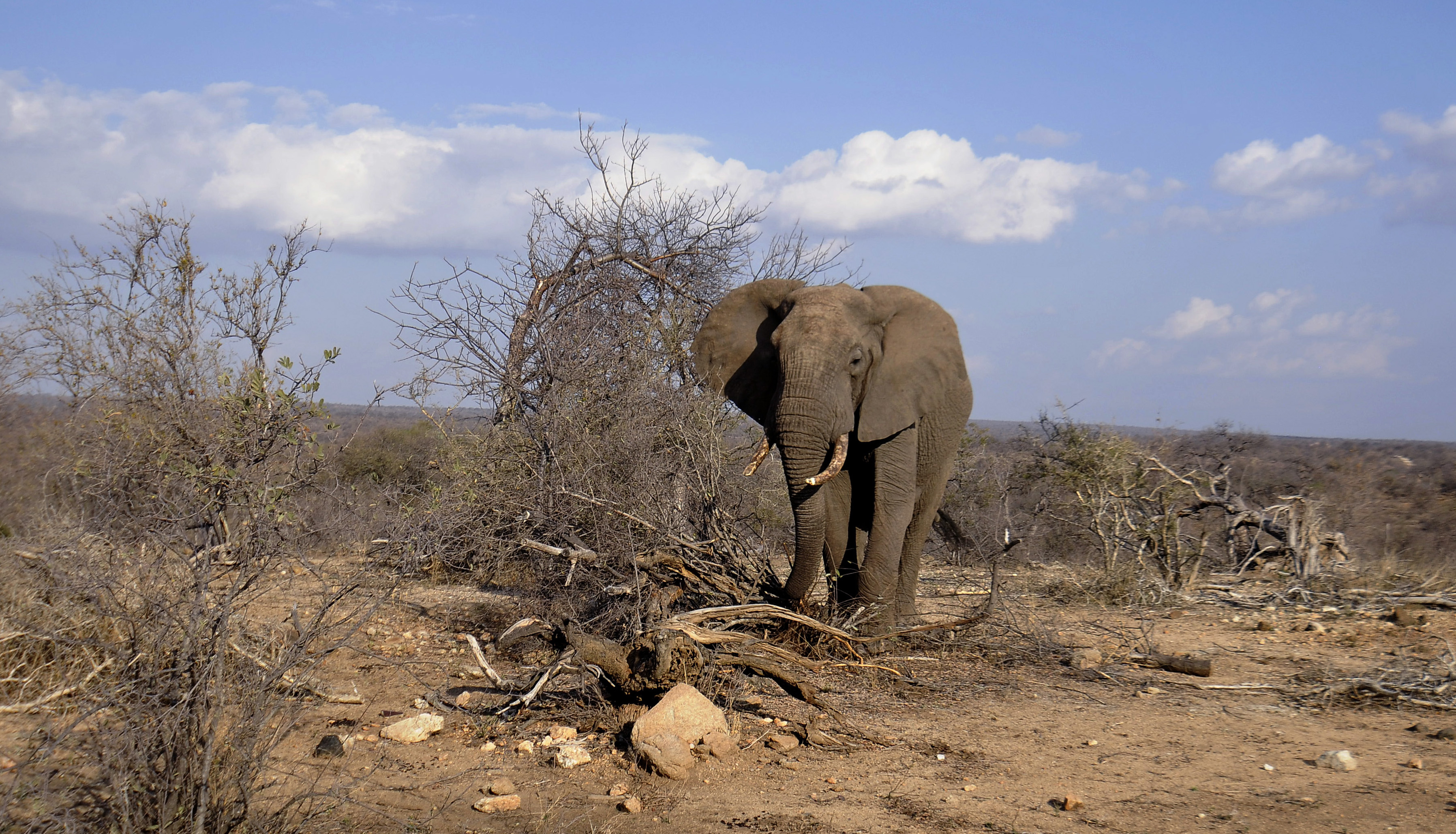
- Bush elephant in Balule

- Location within Limpopo Location within South Africa
- Location: Limpopo, South Africa
- Nearest city: Phalaborwa
- Coordinates: 24°09′S 30°59′E
- Area: 40,000 ha (99,000 acres)

Balule Nature Reserve is a protected area in Limpopo Province, South Africa which forms part of the Greater Kruger National Park as a member of the Associated Private Nature Reserves (APNR). As part of a wildlife conservation initiative, all fences separating APNR reserves – Balule, Timbavati, Klaserie, Umbabat, – and the Kruger National Park have been removed.

The ecological benefits of this initiative have made the region a popular ecotourism destination and conservation efforts have ensured that the wildlife population includes all the Big Five game.

== History ==
The Balule area of the Greater Kruger National Park initially consisted several separate fenced game farms. In the early 1990s, landowners decided to remove the fences separating their properties in aid of conservation in order to increase the grazing area for the local wildlife and to diversify the animal gene pool. By the end of the decade, most Balule landowners had joined in the venture creating a much larger area for game to roam unhindered by fences, and hunting was curtailed. Kruger authorities noted the ecological benefits and decided to incorporate the Balule area into the Greater Kruger National Park by removing the fence between the Kruger Park and Klaserie Game Reserve as well as between the Klaserie and Olifants Game Reserves. Today the Balule reserve covers around 40,000 hectares in area (The area periodically extends as more landowners join the initiative and become incorporated).

== Geography ==
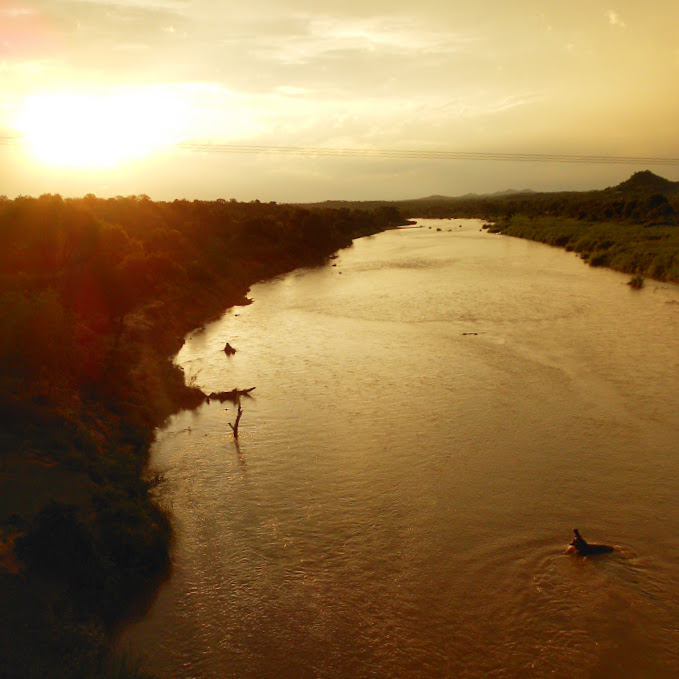
Sunset over the Olifants River, Balule

Balule Nature Reserve is situated on the western boundary of the Kruger Park, in the Limpopo province of South Africa, southwest of Phalaborwa, and north of Hoedspruit. The perennial Olifants River flows for approximately 20 km through the center of the reserve. The reserve consists of a number of smaller privately owned parks, these include:

- Olifants River Game Reserve
- Olifants River Eastern Conservancy
- Olifants West Game Reserve
- York Game Reserve
- Parsons Game Reserve
- Olifants North Game Reserve
- Grietjie Game Reserve
- Jejane Private Game Reserve
- Pridelands Conservancy

== Flora and fauna ==
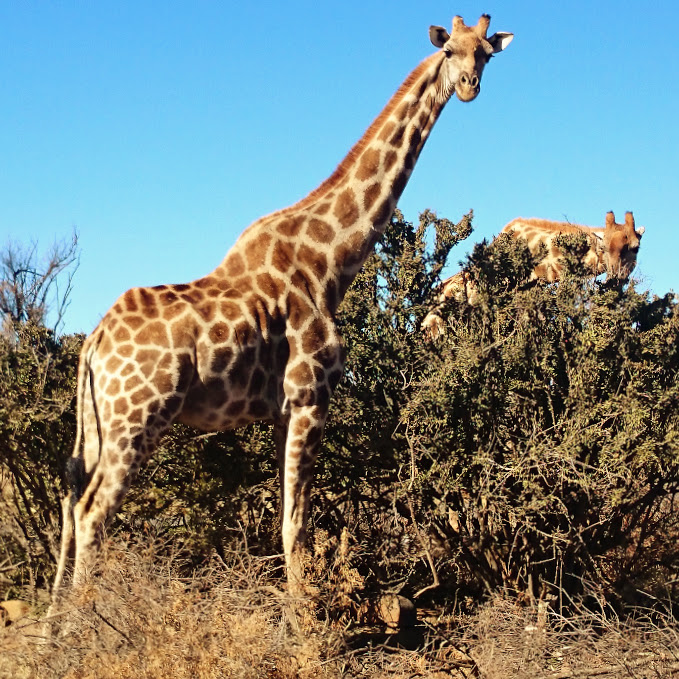
Two giraffe browsing in the Balule Nature Reserve

Balule is located in the subtropical lowveld, an area with multiple eco-zones resulting in significant variety in the flora with over 336 documented tree species in the region. Baobab trees, fever trees, knobthorns, marula and mopane trees are predominant species in this wooded savannah.

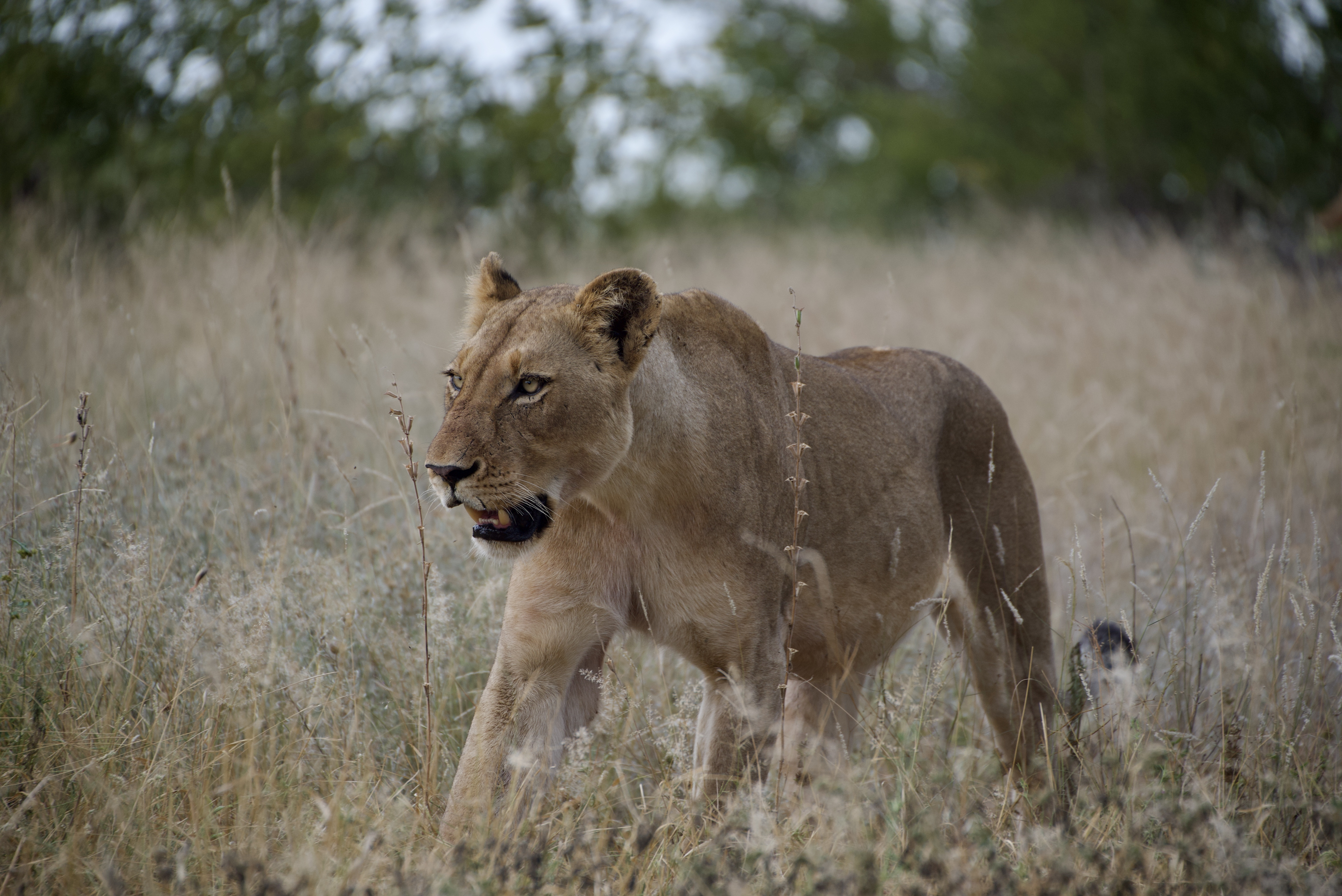
Lioness in Olifants West of the Balule Nature Reserve.

The diverse flora accommodates a diverse array of fauna. More than 220 different kinds of birds inhabit the area including raptor species such as lappet-faced vulture, Pel's fishing owl, martial eagle and impressive larger birds such as kori bustard, ground hornbill and saddle-billed stork. There are over 30 species of mammals ranging from plains game such as zebra, wildebeest and South African giraffe to predators such as lion, African leopard and southeast African cheetah. The rivers and other watering holes are home to large herds of hippos and Nile crocodiles, and in the long dry seasons these areas are heavily trafficked by wildlife and safari tour groups alike. The nature reserve is home to the big five.

== Accommodation ==
The Reserve is managed as an eco-tourism destination and there are a number of private commercial game lodges located within the Reserve. The following lodges and camps offer accommodation in the Balule Reserve:

- Grietjie Reserve Accommodation
- Isilimela Game Lodge
- Amukela Game Lodge
- Balule River Camp
- Baluleni Safari Lodge
- Campfire Safaris Academy
- Ezulwini Game Lodges
- Greenfire Game Lodge
- Kurhula Wildlife Lodge
- Leopard View Game Lodge
- Masodini Private Game Lodge
- Maninghi Lodge
- Mohlabetsi Safari Lodge
- Mpala Lodge
- Naledi Game Lodge
- Parsons Hilltop Safari Camp
- Pondoro Game Lodge
- Raptor Retreat Game Lodge
- Sausage Tree Safari Camp
- Struwig Eco Reserve
- Toro Yaka Bush Lodge

== See also ==
- Associated Private Nature Reserves
- Protected areas of South Africa
- Wildlife of South Africa
