= Nhlaralumi River =

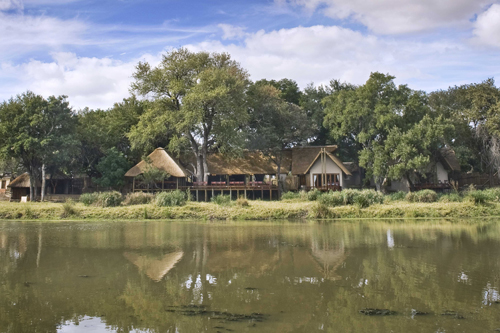
- Simbavati River Lodge seen from the river

- Location within South Africa

Location
- Country: South Africa
- Region: Mpumalanga

Physical characteristics
- Source
  - location: Thornybush Game Reserve, Mpumalanga
  - coordinates: 24°26′51″S 31°16′20″E
- Mouth
  - location: Confluence with Olifants River, Mpumalanga
  - coordinates: 24°02′32″S 31°30′04″E

The Nhlaralumi River is a right bank tributary of the Olifants River in the Kruger National Park, in northern Mpumalanga, South Africa. Its origin is in Thornybush Game Reserve. Its northeastwards course takes it through the Timbavati Game Reserve, Umbabat Nature Reserve and eventually the western Kruger Park.

== Flow volume and frequency ==
After artificial impoundments were constructed in the upper reaches of the river, the river became ephemeral with impaired flow volume and frequency. The Dando floods of 18 January 2012 destroyed some artificial impoundments in the upper reaches of the river, and caused extensive damage to the riparian zone environment besides dwellings and roads downstream. Without the impoundments the water table rose to near the bed surface, and the riparian vegetation and diversity of animal life improved. Rains of 2013 and 2014 were once again sufficient for water flow to resume. The Mbali dam in front of Simbavati Hilltop Lodge in Timbavati was destroyed in 2014, but was repaired in October 2016. The owners of Ingwelala, who are in favour of an open water system, were skeptical that all requirements in terms of permits, permissions, authorization, safety standards, size and flow-through were adhered to during its reconstruction.

== Flora ==
Riparian vegetation includes appel-leaf, tamboti, figs, leadwoods, weeping boer-bean and acacia species.

== See also ==
- List of rivers in South Africa
