= Associated Private Nature Reserves =

Associated Private Nature Reserves, (APNR), is an association of privately owned nature reserves bordering to the west of the Kruger National Park. Collectively they represent 1,800 square kilometres (180,000 ha) of land dedicated to conservation. In June 1993 the fences between Kruger National Park and all the APNR were removed in the interest of nature conservation as a whole.

== Members ==
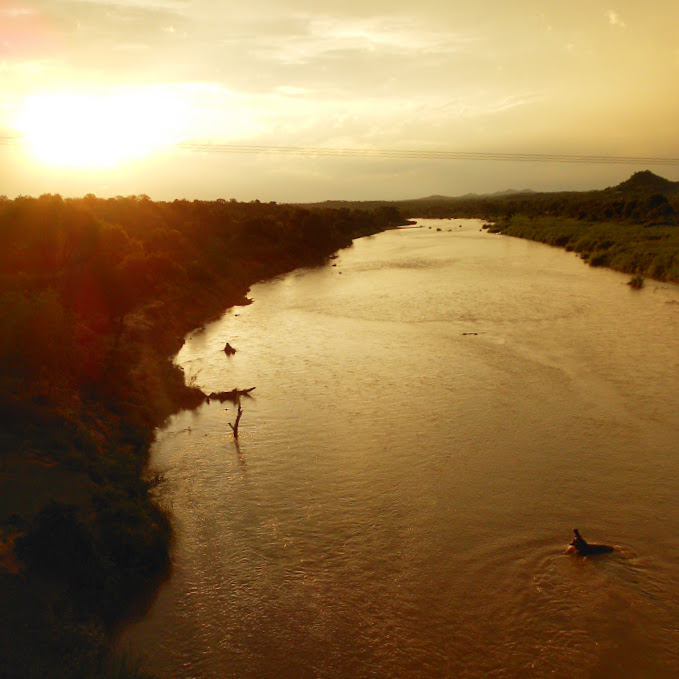
Sunset over the Olifants River in the Balule Nature Reserve

The following reserves are members of the APNR:

- Balule Nature Reserve
  - Greater Olifants River Conservancy
  - Olifants North Game Reserve
  - Olifants West Game Reserve
  - Grietjie Game Reserve
  - Jejane Private Nature Reserve
  - Mohlabetsi River Nature Reserve
  - Mohlabetsi South Nature Reserve
  - Parsons Hilltop Game Reserve
  - York Game Reserve
- Kapama Game Reserve
- Klaserie Game Reserve
- Timbavati Game Reserve
- Thornybush Game Reserve
- Umbabat Game Reserve

== See also ==
- Greater Kruger National Park
- Protected areas of South Africa
