= Feeding behavior of spotted hyenas =

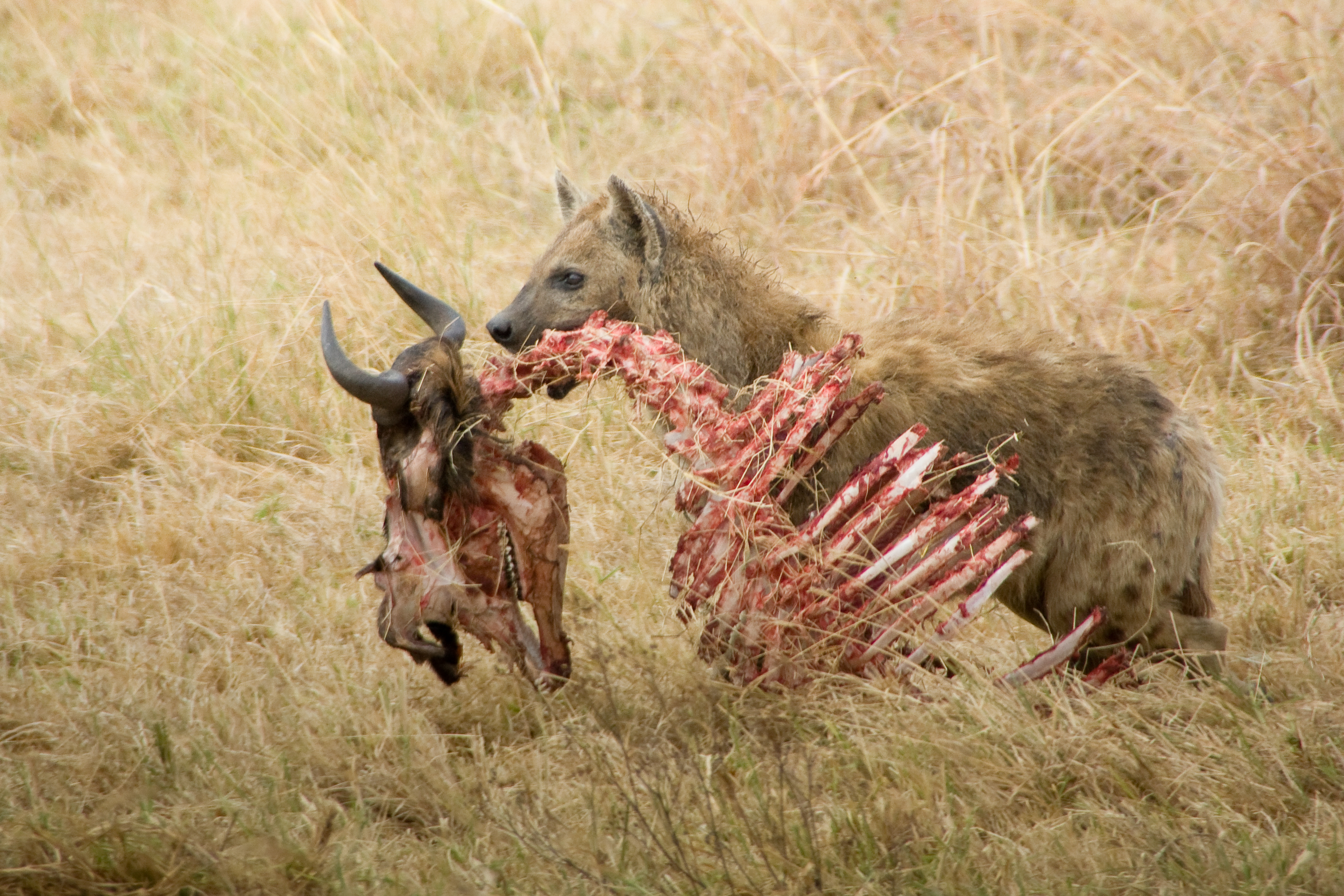
with a wildebeest skeleton in Karatu, Arusha, Tanzania

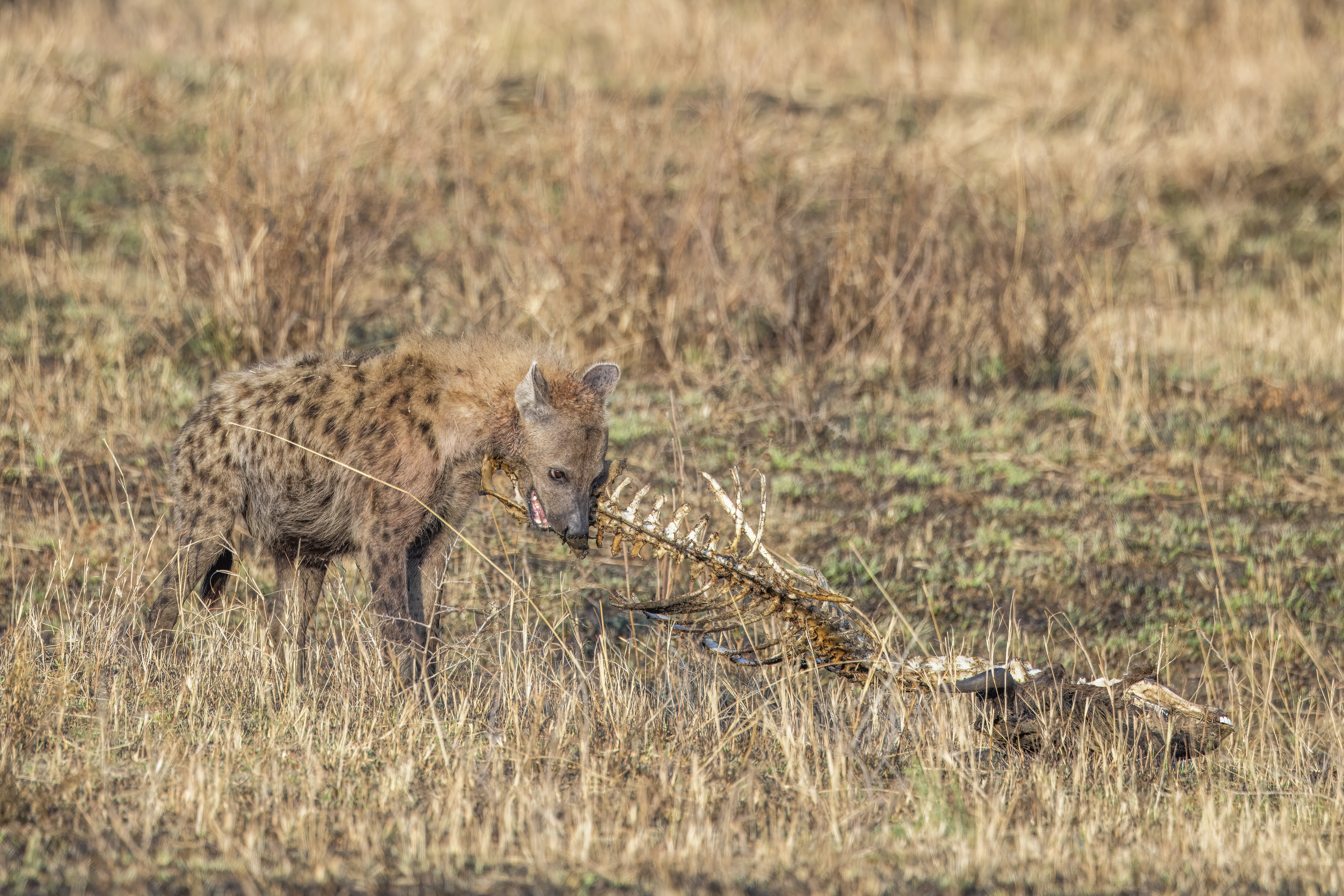
with a wildebeest skeleton in Serengeti National Park, Tanzania

The spotted hyena is the most carnivorous member of the Hyaenidae. Unlike its brown and striped cousins, the spotted hyena is primarily a predator rather than a scavenger. One of the earliest studies to demonstrate its hunting abilities was done by Hans Kruuk, a Dutch wildlife ecologist who showed through a 7-year study of hyena populations in Ngorongoro and Serengeti National Park during the 1960s that spotted hyenas hunt as much as lions, and with later studies this has been shown to be the average in all areas of Africa. However spotted hyenas remain mislabeled as scavengers, often even by ecologists and wildlife documentary channels.

== Prey ==
Blue wildebeest are the most commonly taken medium-sized ungulate prey item in both Ngorongoro and the Serengeti, with zebra and Thomson's gazelles coming close behind. Cape buffalo are rarely attacked due to differences in habitat preference, though adult bulls have been recorded to be taken on occasion. In Kruger National Park, blue wildebeest, cape buffalo, Burchell's zebra, greater kudu and impala are the spotted hyena's most important prey, while giraffe, impala, wildebeest and zebra are its major food sources in the nearby Timbavati area. Springbok and kudu are the main prey in Namibia's Etosha National Park, and springbok in the Namib. In the southern Kalahari, gemsbok, wildebeest and springbok are the principal prey. In Chobe, the spotted hyena's primary prey consists of migratory zebra and resident impala. In Kenya's Masai Mara, 80% of the spotted hyena's prey consists of topi and Thomson's gazelle, save for during the four-month period when zebra and wildebeest herds migrate to the area. Bushbuck, suni and buffalo are the dominant prey items in the Aberdare Mountains, while Grant's gazelle, gerenuk, sheep, goats and cattle are likely preyed upon in northern Kenya.

In west Africa, the spotted hyena is primarily a scavenger who will occasionally attack domestic stock and medium-size antelopes in some areas. In Cameroon, it is common for spotted hyenas to feed on small antelopes like kob, but may also scavenge on reedbuck, kongoni, buffalo, giraffe, African elephant, topi and roan antelope carcasses. Records indicate that spotted hyenas in Malawi feed on medium to large-sized ungulates such as waterbuck and impala. In Tanzania's Selous Game Reserve, spotted hyenas primarily prey on wildebeest, followed by buffalo, zebra, impala, giraffe, reedbuck and kongoni. In Uganda, it is thought that the species primarily preys on birds and reptiles, while in Zambia it is considered a scavenger.

Spotted hyenas have also been found to catch fish, tortoises, humans, black rhinoceros, hippopotamus calves, young African elephants, pangolins and pythons. There is at least one record of four hyenas killing an adult or subadult hippopotamus in Kruger National Park. Spotted hyenas may consume leather articles such as boots and belts around campsites. Jane Goodall recorded spotted hyenas attacking or savagely playing with the exterior and interior fittings of cars, and the species is thought to be responsible for eating car tyres.

The fossil record indicates that the now extinct European spotted hyenas primarily fed on Przewalski's horses, Irish elk, reindeer, red deer, roe deer, fallow deer, wild boar, ibex, steppe wisent, aurochs, and woolly rhinoceros. Spotted hyenas are thought to be responsible for the dis-articulation and destruction of some cave bear skeletons. Such large carcasses were an optimal food resource for hyenas, especially at the end of winter, when food was scarce.

== Hunting behaviour ==
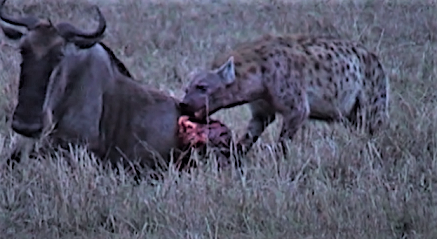
Spotted hyena killing a blue wildebeest

Unlike other large African carnivores, spotted hyenas do not preferentially prey on any species, and only African buffalo and giraffe are significantly avoided. Spotted hyenas prefer prey with a body mass range of 56–182 kg (123–401 lb), with a mode of 102 kg (225 lb). When hunting medium to large sized prey, spotted hyenas tend to select certain categories of animal; young animals are frequently targeted, as are old ones, though the latter category is not so significant when hunting zebras, due to their aggressive anti-predator behaviours. Small prey is killed by being shaken in the mouth, while large prey is eaten alive.

The spotted hyena tracks live prey by sight, hearing and smell. Carrion is detected by smell and the sound of other predators feeding. During daylight hours, they watch vultures descending upon carcasses. Their auditory perception is powerful enough to detect sounds of predators killing prey or feeding on carcasses over distances of up to 10 km (6.2 mi). Unlike the grey wolf, the spotted hyena relies more on sight than smell when hunting, and does not follow its prey's prints or travel in single file.

Spotted hyenas usually hunt wildebeest either singly, or in groups of two or three. They catch adult wildebeest usually after 5 km (3.1 mi) chases at speeds of up to 60 km/h (37 mi/h). Chases are usually initiated by one hyena and, with the exception of cows with calves, there is little active defence from the wildebeest herd. Wildebeest will sometimes attempt to escape hyenas by taking to water although, in such cases, the hyenas almost invariably catch them.

Zebras require different hunting methods to those used for wildebeest, due to their habit of running in tight groups and aggressive defence from stallions. Typical zebra hunting groups consist of 10–25 hyenas, though there is one record of a hyena killing an adult zebra unaided. During a chase, zebras typically move in tight bunches, with the hyenas pursuing behind in a crescent formation. Chases are usually relatively slow, with an average speed of 15–30 km/h. A stallion will attempt to place himself between the hyenas and the herd, though once a zebra falls behind the protective formation it is immediately set upon, usually after a chase of 3 km (1.9 mi). Though hyenas may harass the stallion, they usually only concentrate on the herd and attempt to dodge the stallion's assaults. Unlike stallions, mares typically only react aggressively to hyenas when their foals are threatened. Unlike wildebeest, zebras rarely take to water when escaping hyenas.

When hunting Thomson's gazelles, spotted hyenas usually operate alone, and prey primarily on young fawns. Chases against both adult and young gazelles can cover distances of 5 km (3.1 mi) with speeds of 60 km/h (37 mi/h). Female gazelles do not defend their fawns, though they may attempt to distract hyenas by feigning weakness.

== Feeding habits ==
A single spotted hyena can eat at least 14.5 kg of meat per meal, and although they act aggressively toward each other when feeding, they compete with each other mostly through speed of eating, rather than by fighting as lions do. Spotted hyenas can take less than two minutes to eat a gazelle fawn, while a group of 35 hyenas can completely consume an adult zebra in 36 minutes. Spotted hyenas do not require much water, and typically only spend 30 seconds drinking.

When feeding on an intact carcass, spotted hyenas will first consume the meat around the loins and anal region, then open the abdominal cavity and pull out the soft organs. Once the stomach, its wall and contents are consumed, the hyenas will eat the lungs and abdominal and leg muscles. Once the muscles have been eaten, the carcass is disassembled and the hyenas carry off pieces to eat in peace. Spotted hyenas are adept at eating their prey in water: they have been observed to dive under floating carcasses to take bites, then resurface to swallow.

The spotted hyena is very efficient at eating its prey; not only is it able to splinter and eat the largest ungulate bones, it is also able to digest them completely. Spotted hyenas can digest all organic components in bones, not just the marrow. Any inorganic material is excreted with the faeces, which consist almost entirely of a white powder with few hairs. They react to alighting vultures more readily than other African carnivores, and are more likely to stay in the vicinity of lion kills or human settlements.
