= Ingwelala =

Conservation area in Mpumalanga, South Africa

Coordinates: 24°09′21″S 31°23′07″E

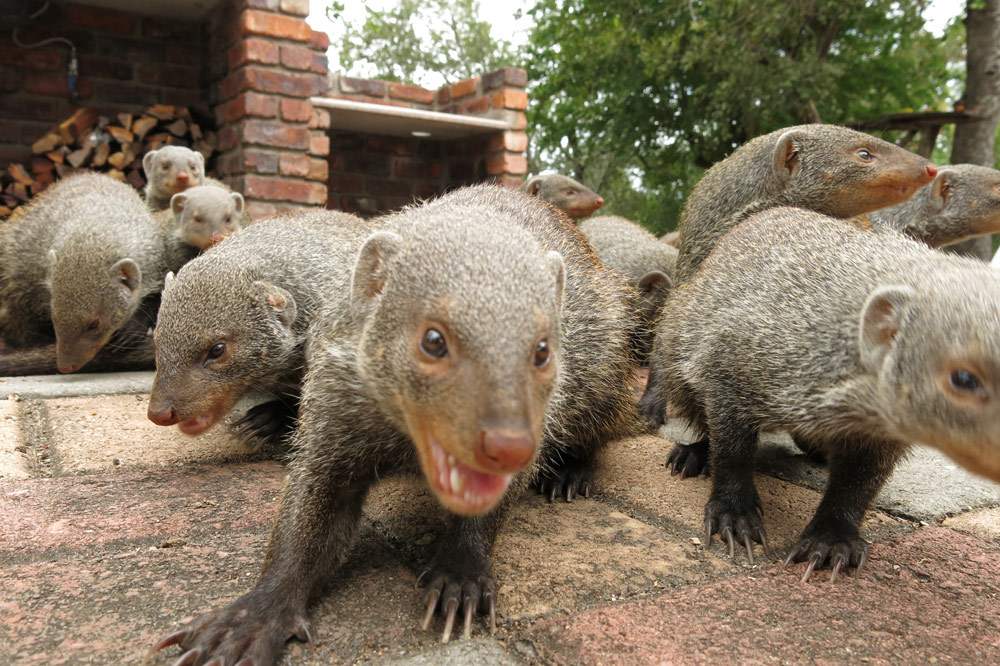
Banded mongooses at Ingwelala

Ingwelala is a private stakeholder nature reserve on the bank of the Nhlaralumi River in the heart of the lowveld, about 65 km from the town of Hoedspruit. The reserve of some 3,000 hectares forms part of the Bushbuckridge Municipality, and adjoins the Umbabat Nature Reserve and the unfenced Kruger National Park.

Ingwelala includes the following game farms:

- Argyle – 1,499 ha registered as Ingwelala Shareblock Ltd.
- Buffelsbed – 1,018 ha registered as Buffelsbed Shareblock Ltd.
- Goedehoop – 372 ha registered as Ingwelala Holdings Ltd.
- Si Bon – 257 ha registered as Si Bon Property Holdings Ltd

== Sibon Lodge ==
Sibon lodge is a private lodge set in the heart of South Africa's bush country. People who own a shareholding in Ingwelala are entitled to use this area prior to booking.
