= Umbabat Nature Reserve =

Coordinates: 24°09′00″S 31°22′16″E

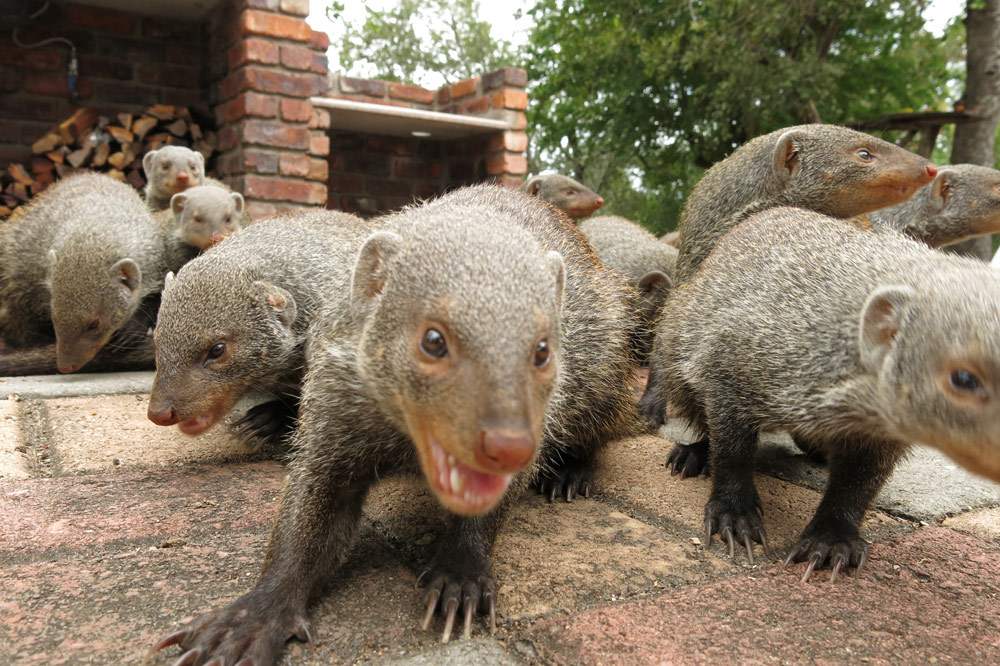
A troop of banded mongoose in a campsite at Umbabat

Umbabat Nature Reserve is situated on the bank of the Nhlaralumi River in the Bushbuckridge Municipality, adjacent to the Kruger National Park. The parts of Umbabat that are declared nature reserves are managed according to the Protected Areas Act No. 57 of 2003.

Besides the Kruger Park, Umbabat is also bordered by the Timbavati and Klaserie Game Reserves, and all have dropped their shared fences in 1988. Several smaller nature reserves make up the Umbabat, and in conjunction with the reserves that constitute the Timbavati, Klaserie and Balule reserves, they collectively form the Associated Private Nature Reserves, which collectively owns 180,000 ha of land, without internal fences.

== See also ==
- Ingwelala
- Protected areas of South Africa
