= Thornybush Game Reserve =

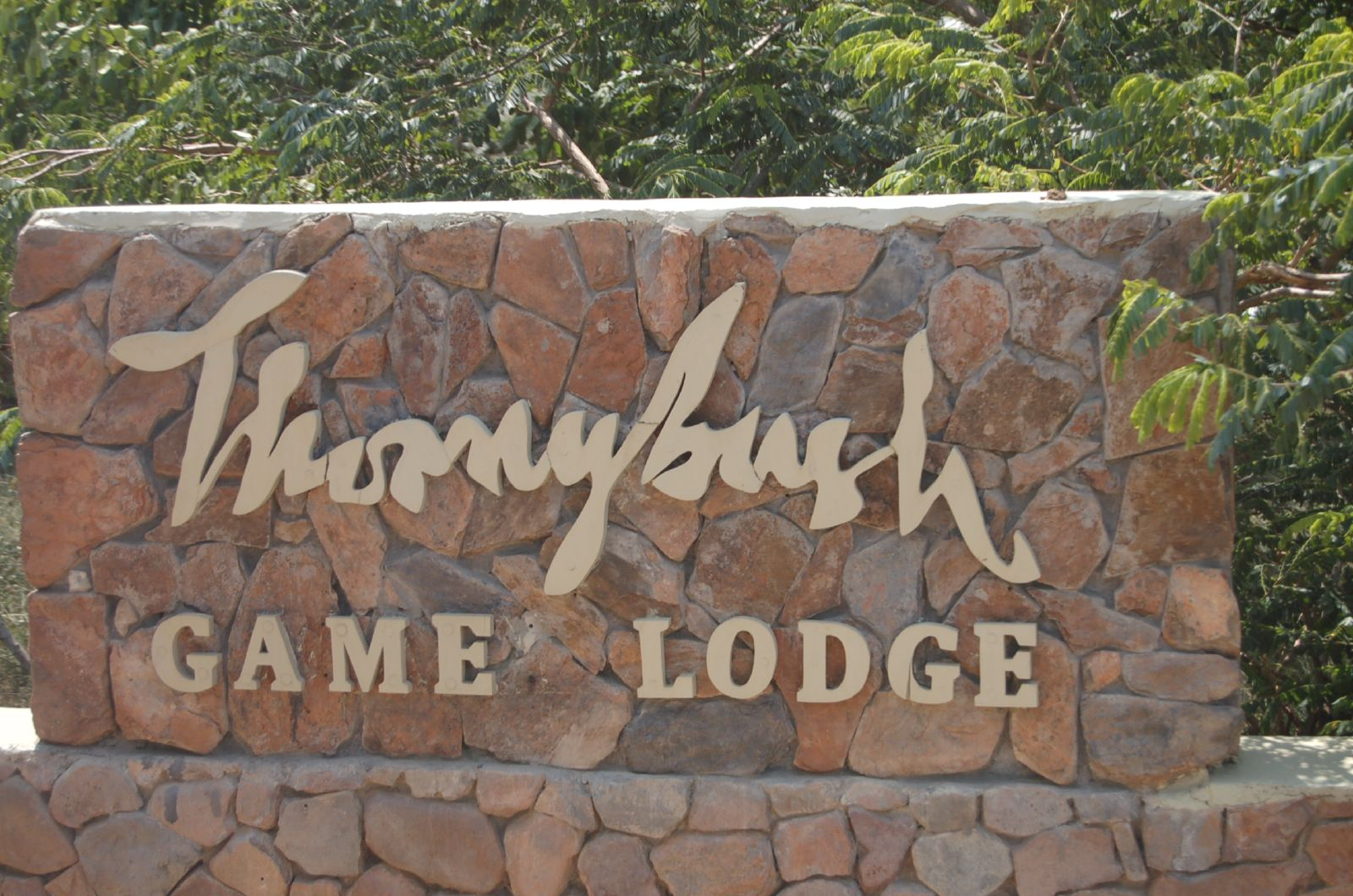
Thornybush Game Lodge

Thornybush Game Reserve is a private game reserve, near Hoedspruit, in the Limpopo province of South Africa. It borders the Kapama Game Reserve and is located close to the Timbavati Game Reserve and the Kruger Park. The Reserve's surface area is approximately 14,000 ha of mainly open savannah.

As with many private reserves in South Africa, Thornybush is managed as an eco-tourism destination, thus the Reserve is funded by means of a number of up-market private commercial game lodges located within the Reserve. They are involved in different kind of projects such as supporting local community through contributions to surrounding schools and sustainable farming.

== Wildlife ==
Thornybush Game Reserve shares an unfenced border with the Kruger National Park, which means that animals can move freely between the reserve and the park.

The wildlife counts:

- 147 mammals, including the Big five, giraffe, Wild dog, Southeast African cheetah and many more.
- 114 reptiles such as the Giant plated lizard or the Black mamba.
- 507 birds like the well known Lilac-breasted roller.
- 49 fish.
- 34 amphibians.
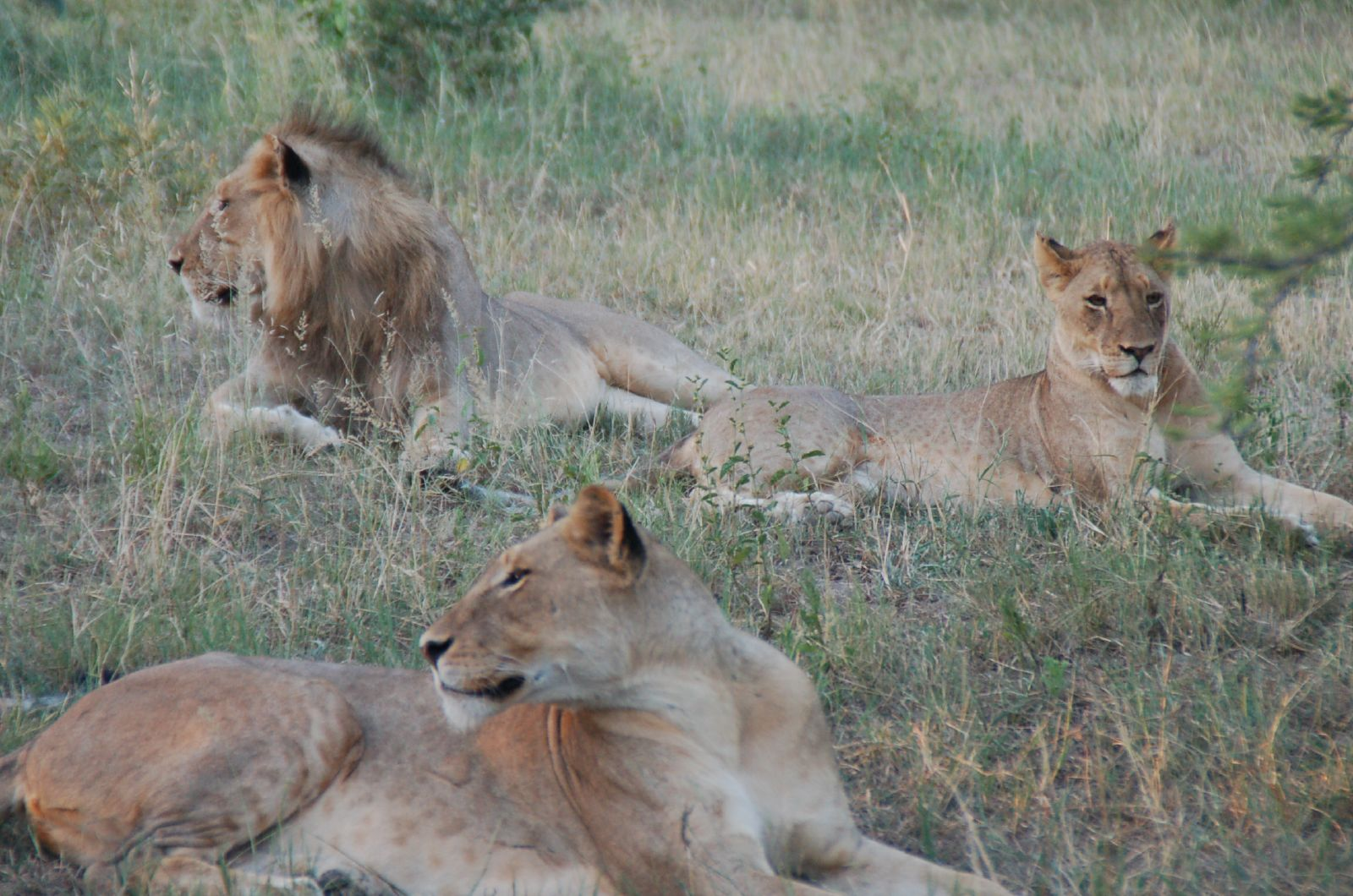
Lions

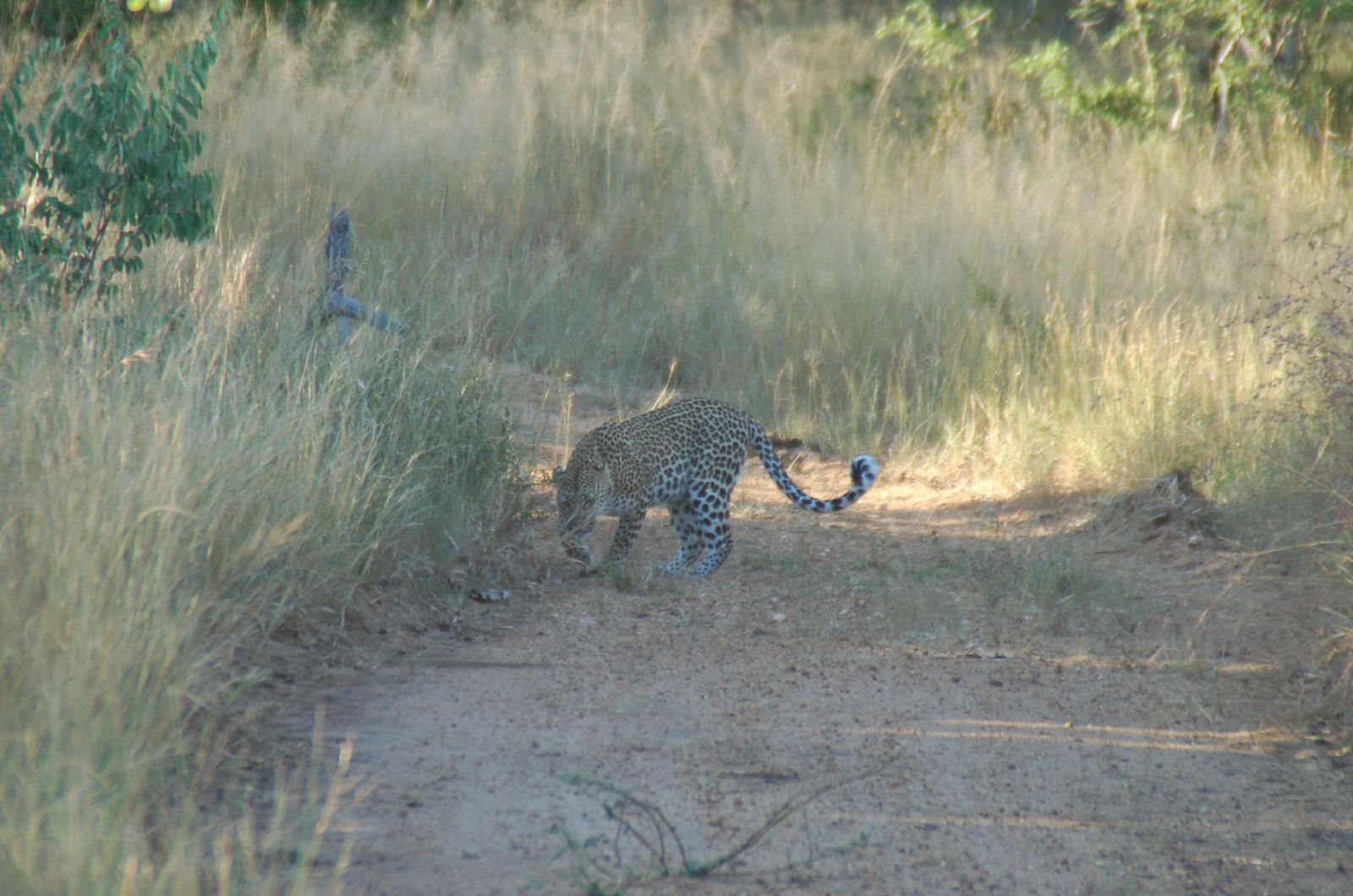
Leopard

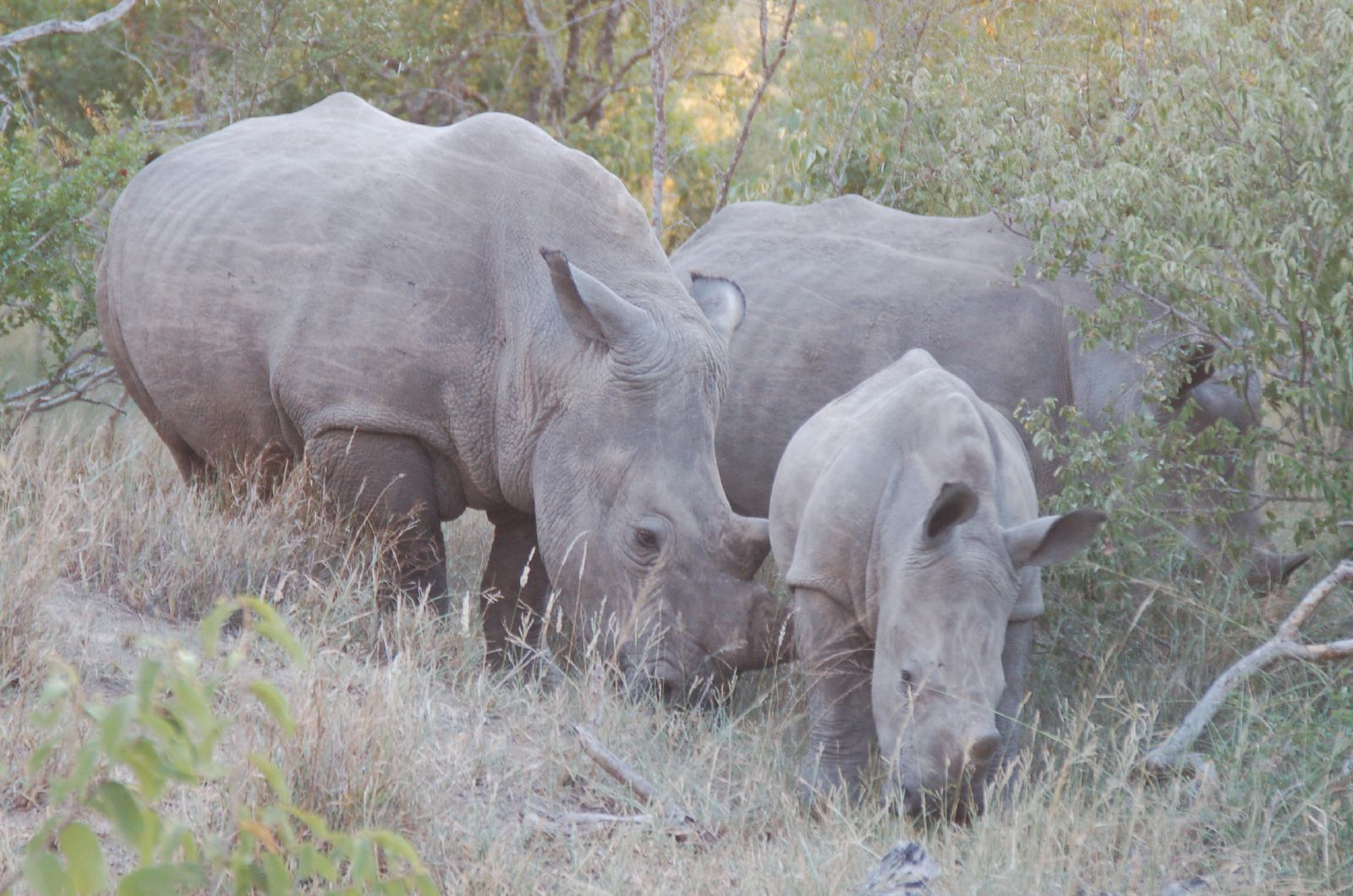
White Rhinos

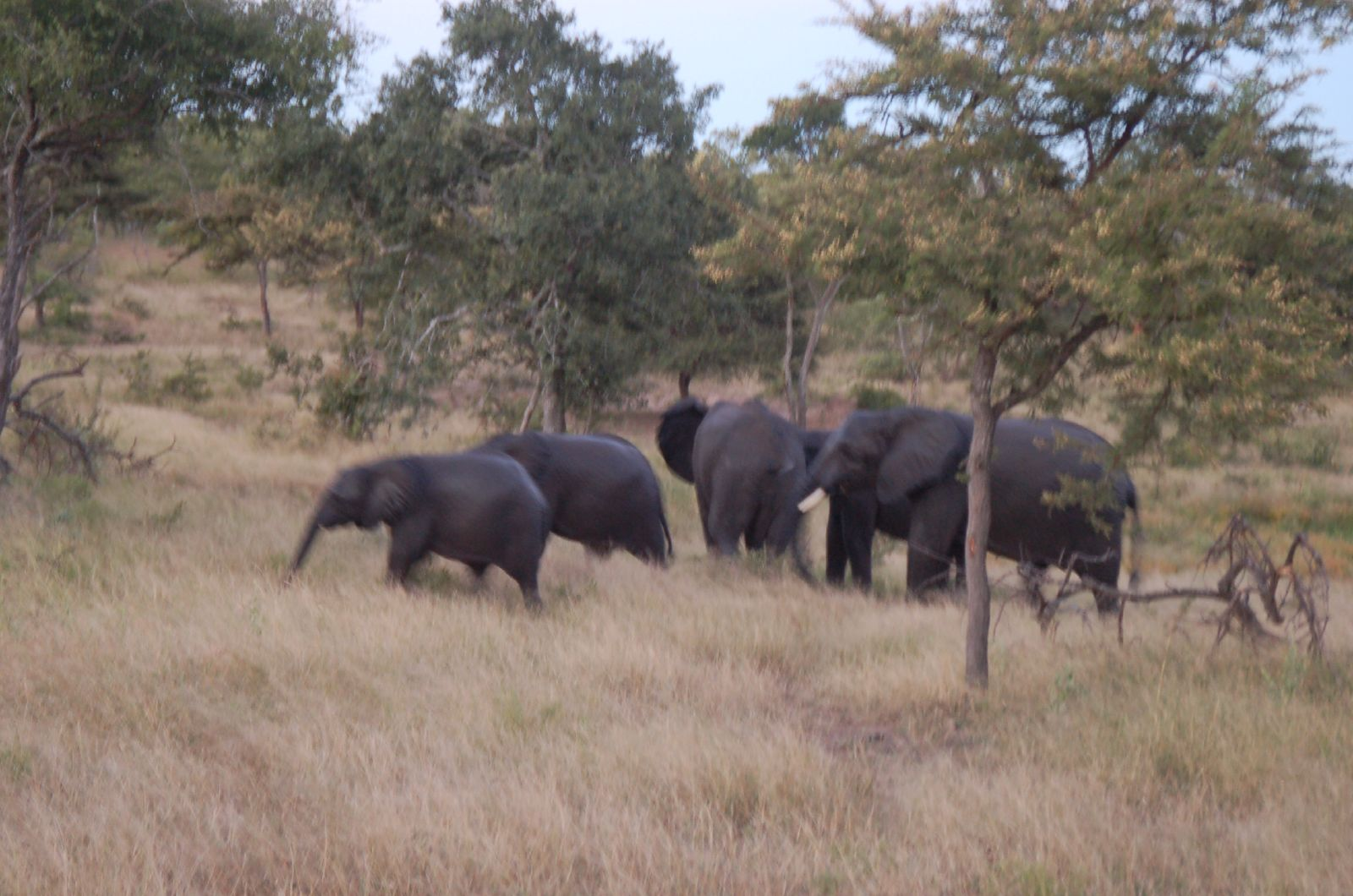
Elephants

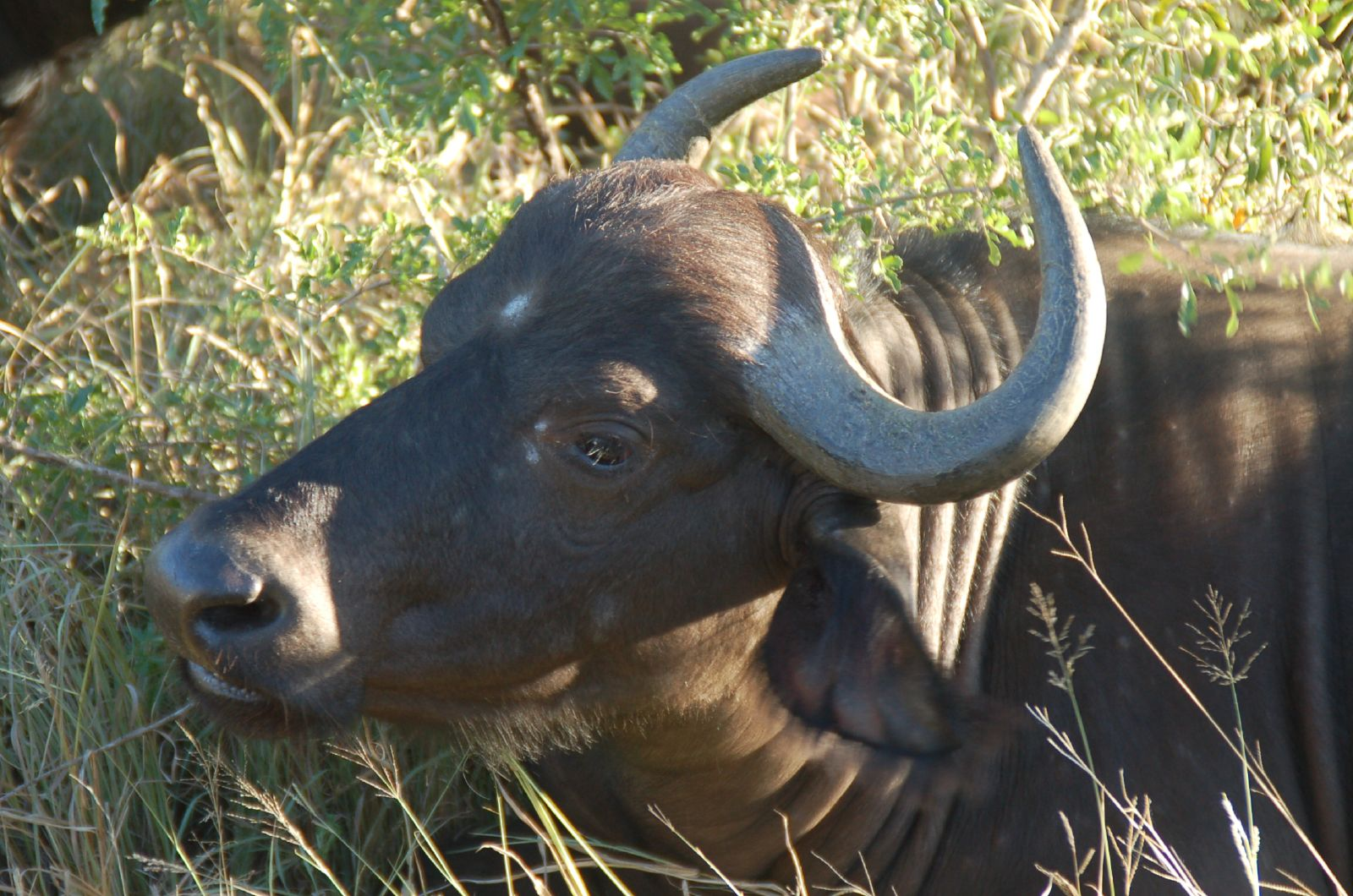
Cape Buffalo
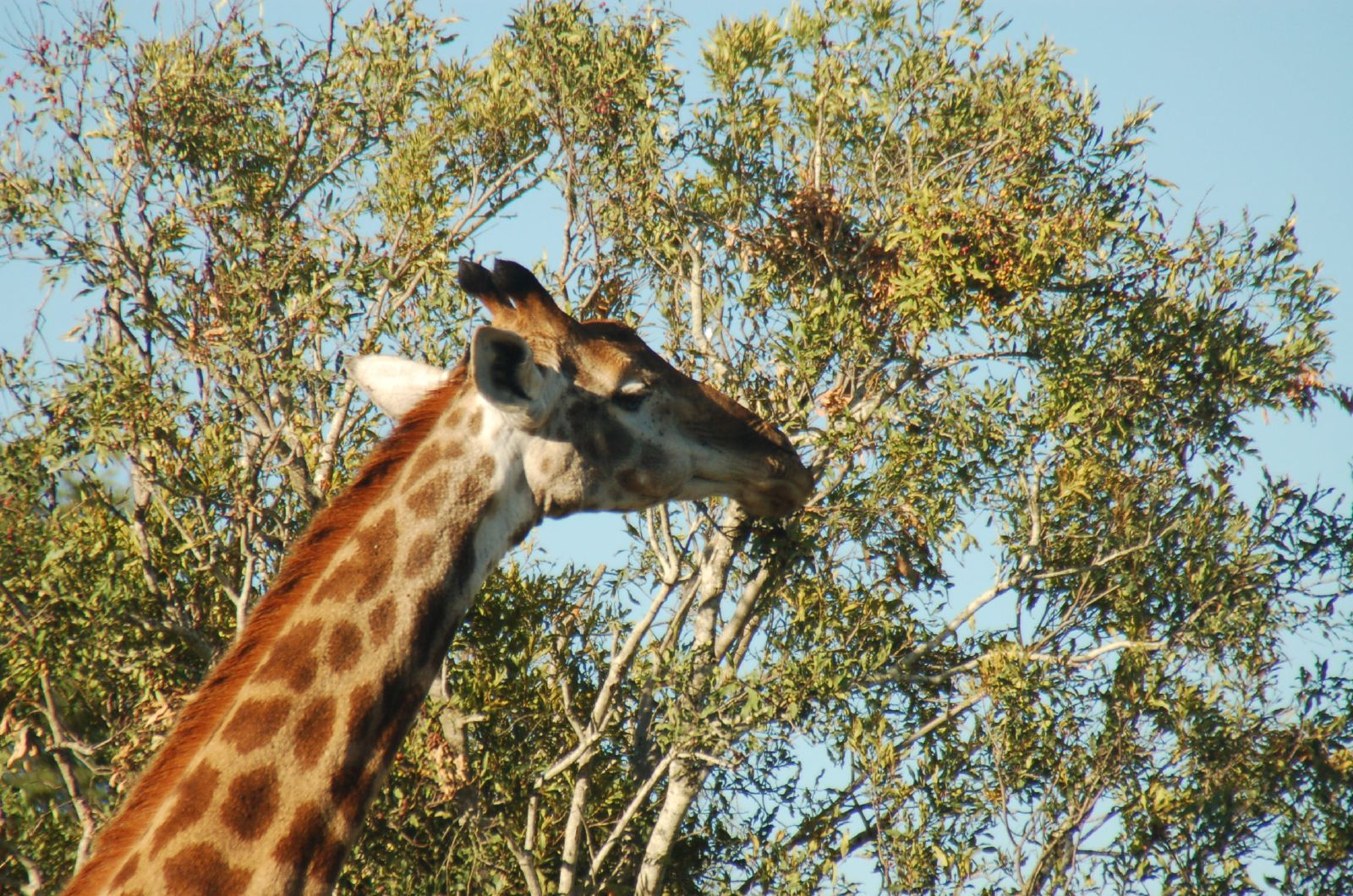
Giraffe

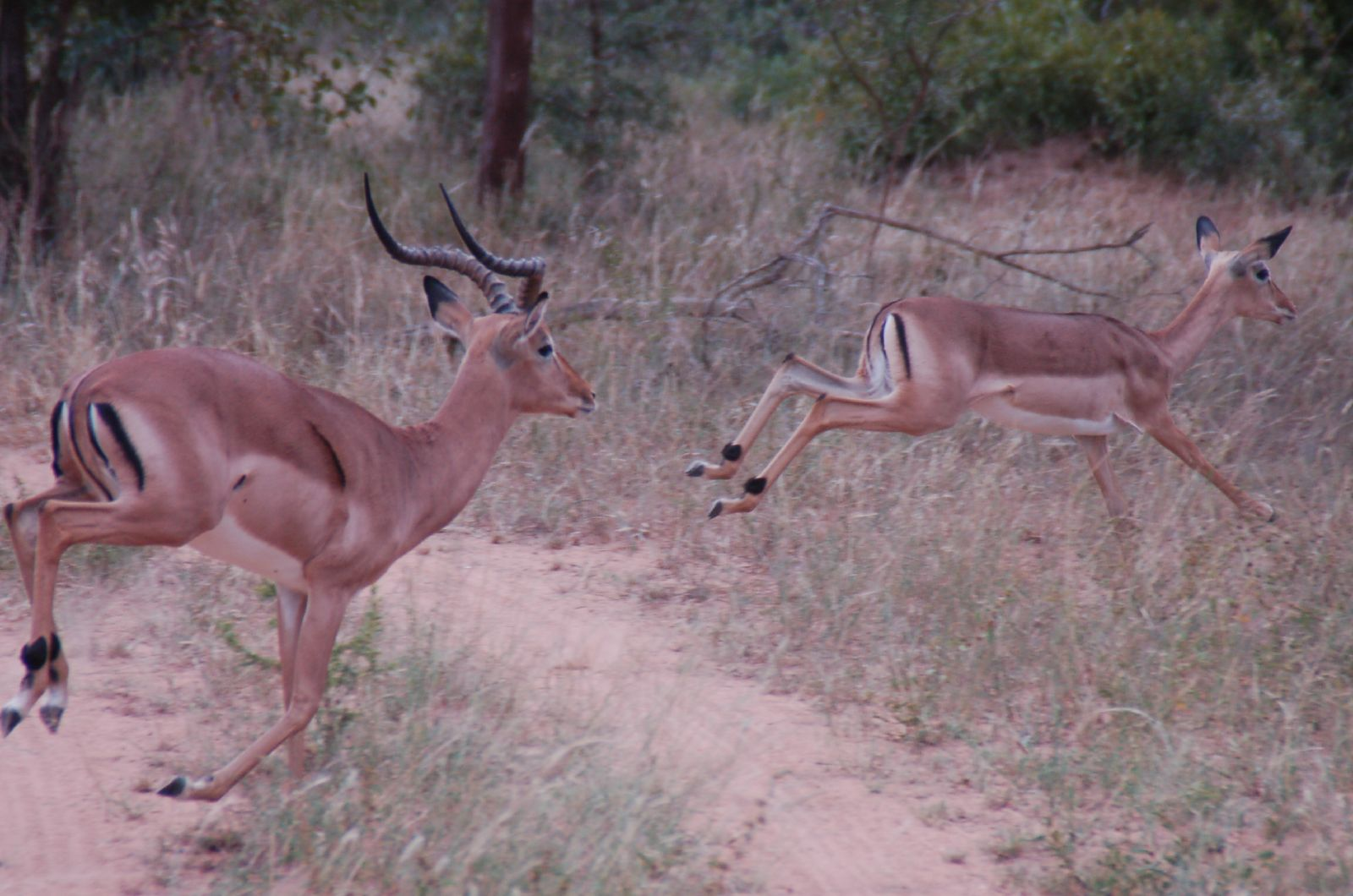
Impalas

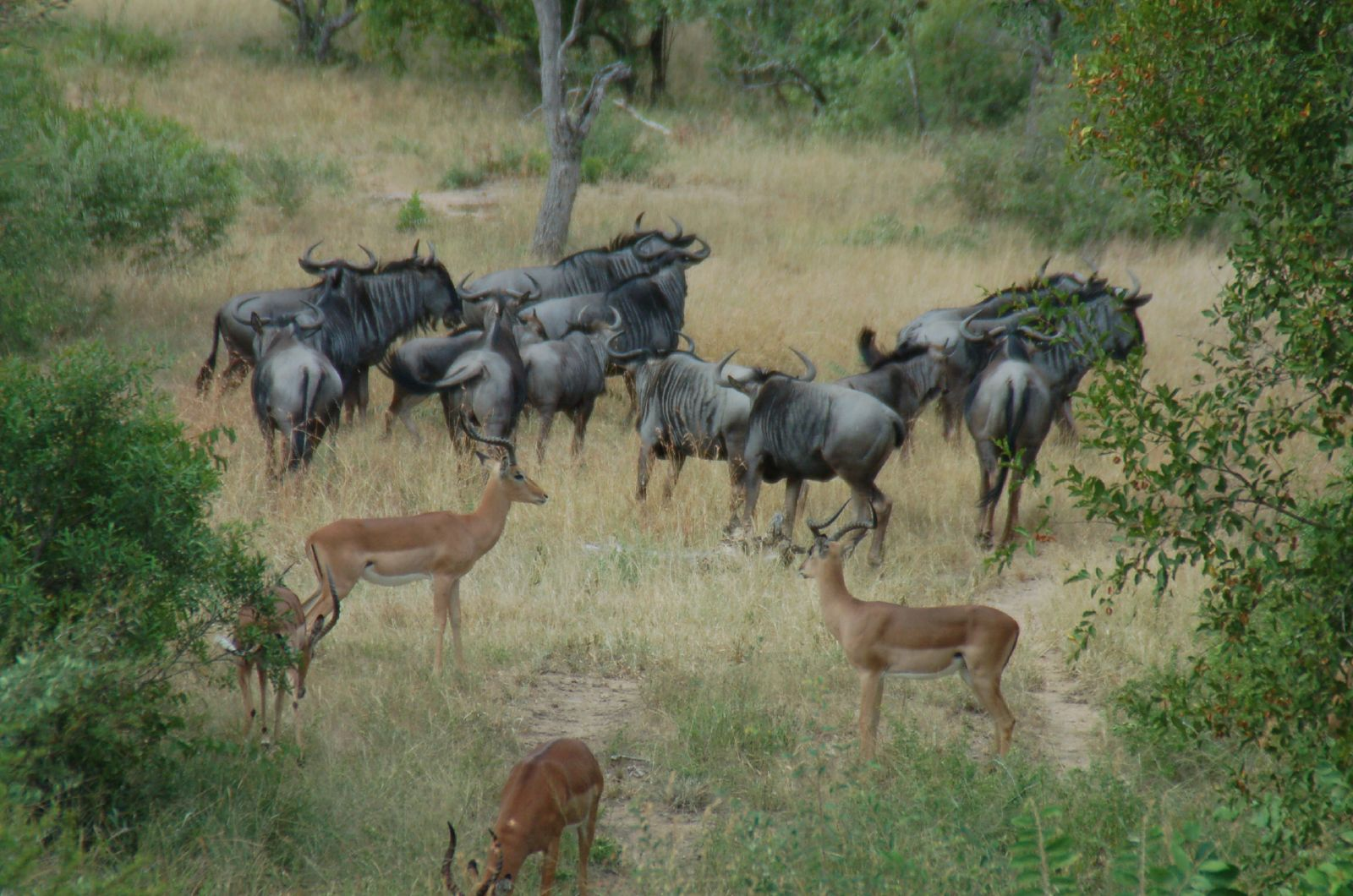
Wildebeest

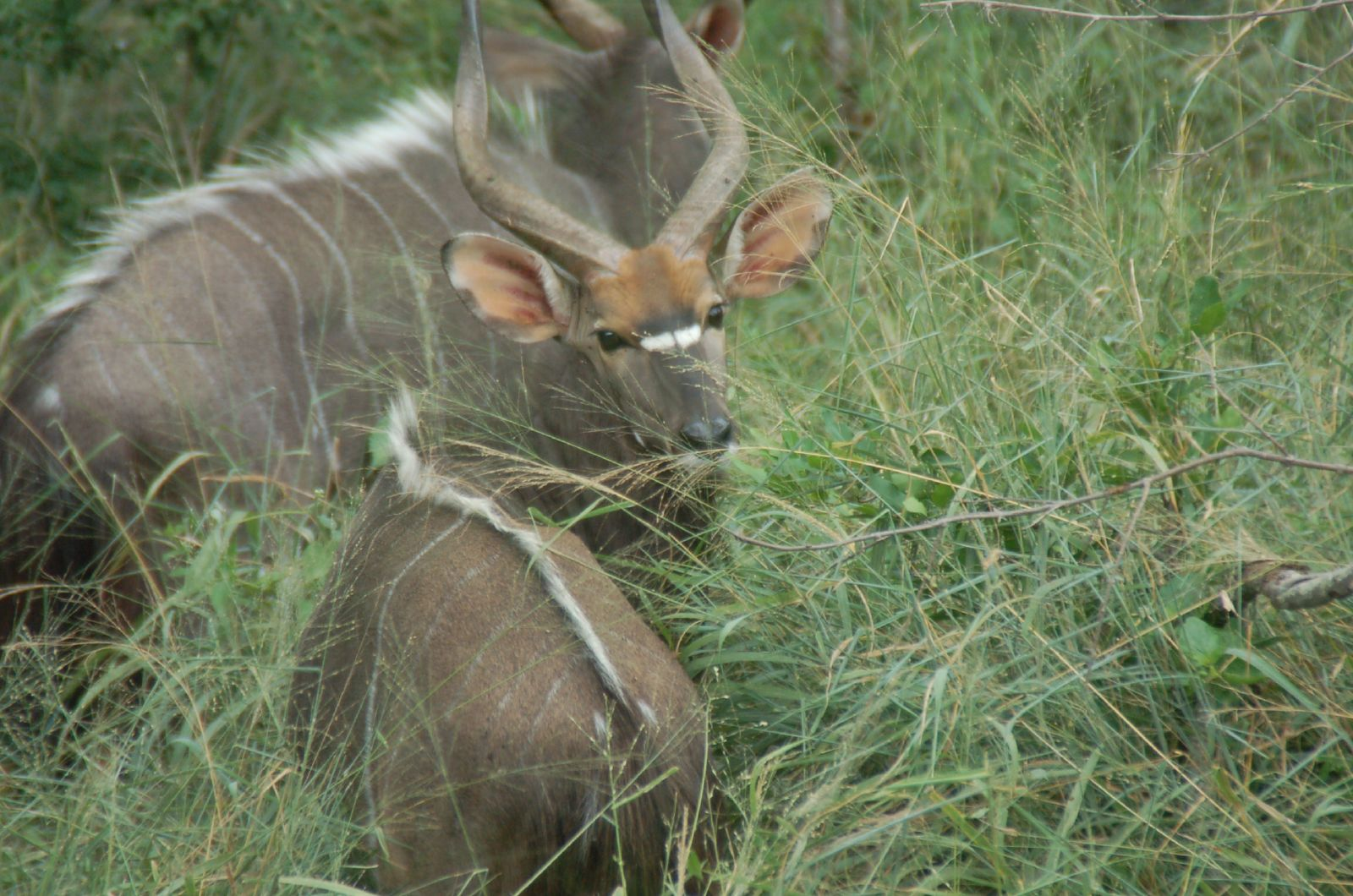
Kudu

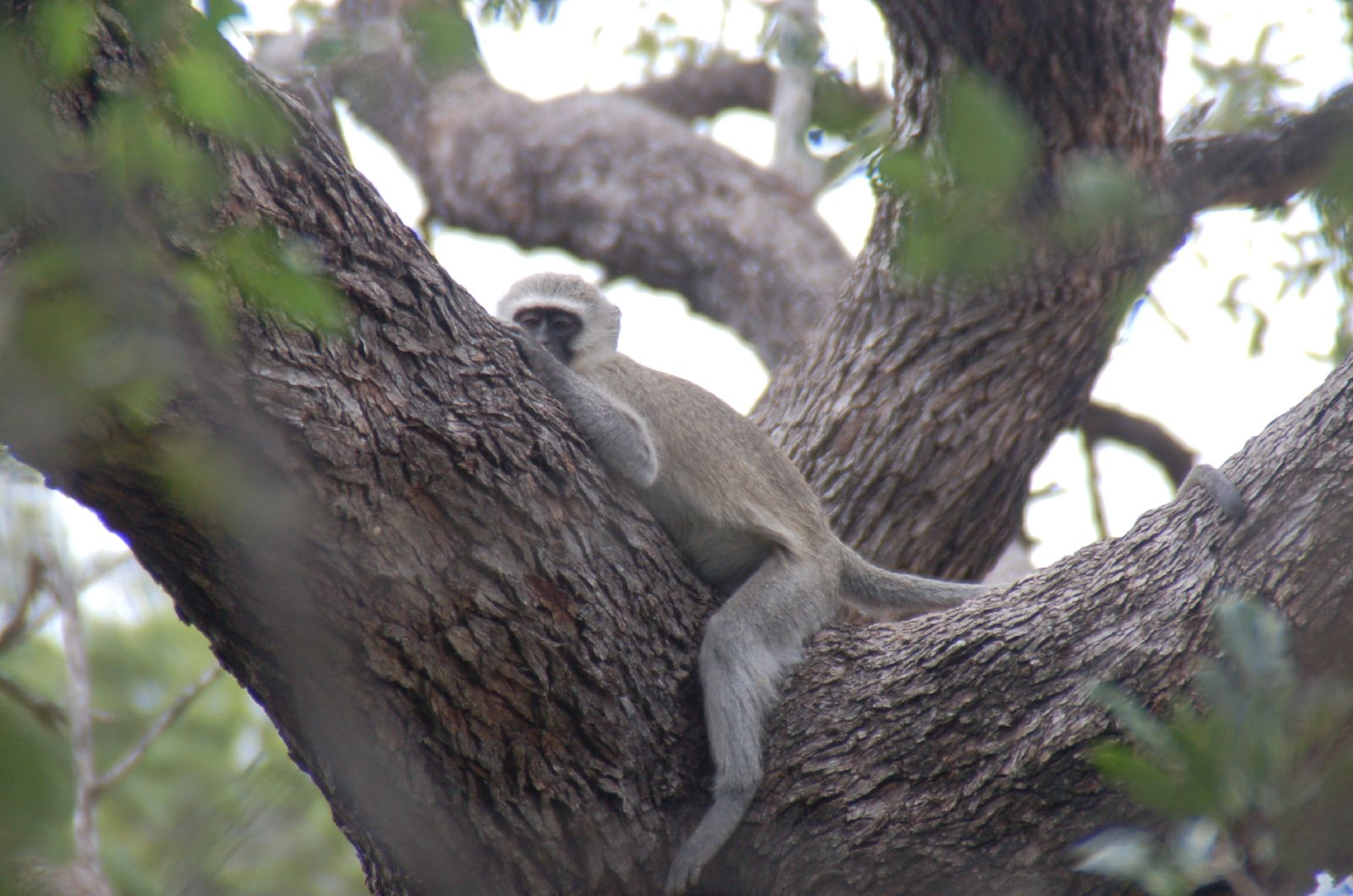
Varlet monkey

== Accommodation ==
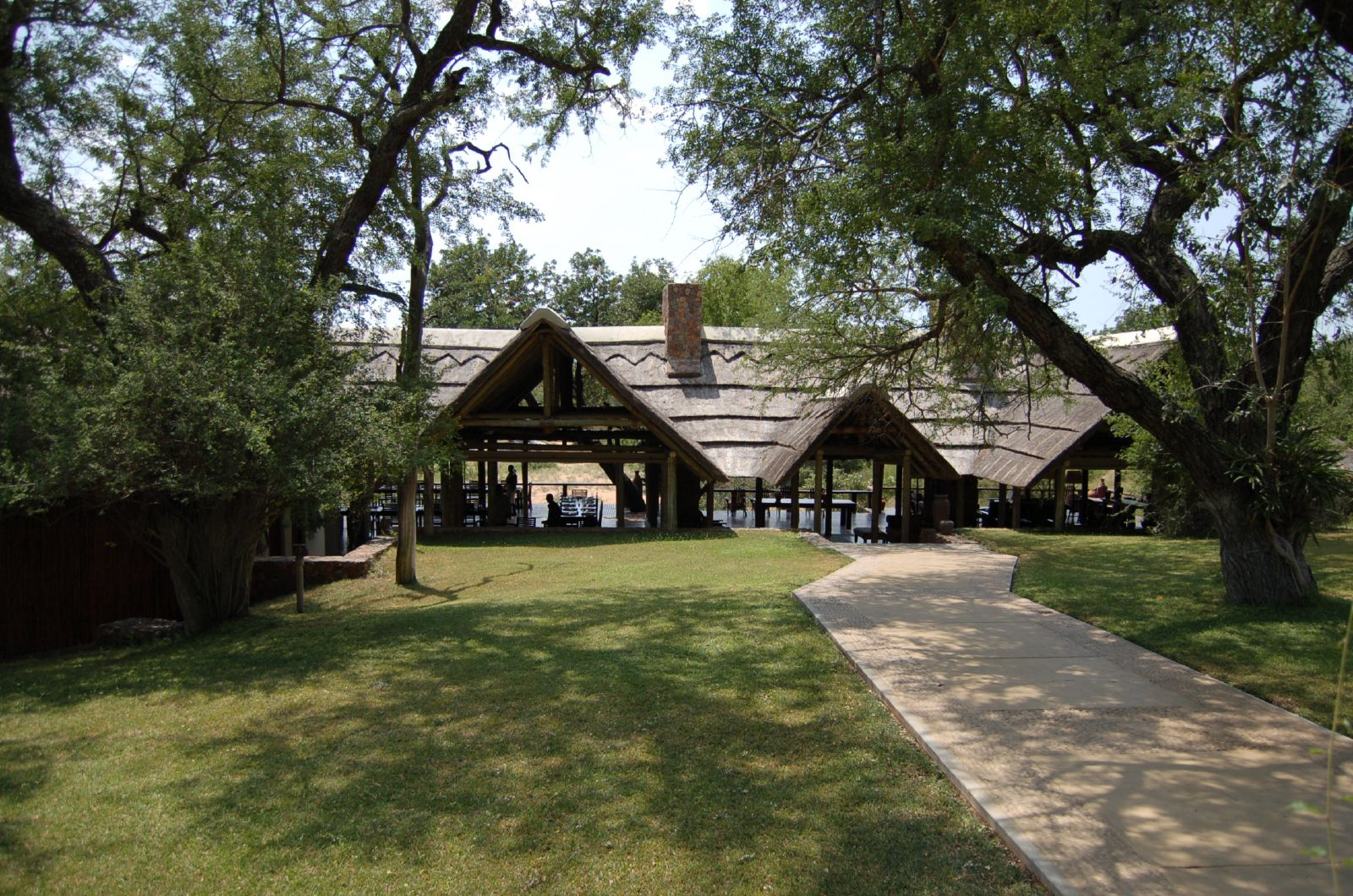
Lodge

There are in total 12 different places to stay in Thornybush Game Reserve:

Premium Collection :

- Saseka Tented Camp: 9 tents with capacity for 20 people
- The River Lodge: 6 suites with a capacity of 12 people
- The Game Lodge: 18 suites with a capacity of 40 people
- Shumbalala Game Lodge: 5 suites with a capacity of 10 people

Classic Collection :

- Waterside Lodge: 20 suites with a capacity of 40 people
- N'kaya Lodge: 4 suites with a capacity of 8 people
- Shimungwe Lodge: 4 suites with a capacity of 8 people
- Waterbuck Lodge: 4 suites with a capacity of 8 people
- Serondella Lodge: 3 suites and a family suite with a capacity of 8 people
- Monwana Lodge: 2 family suites, 1 king size suite and 1 honeymoon suite
- Jackalberry Lodge: 8 suites with a capacity of 16 people
- Chapungu Tented Bush Camp: 8 tents with a capacity of 16 people

== See also ==
- Protected areas of South Africa
