= Safari lodge =

Tourist accommodation

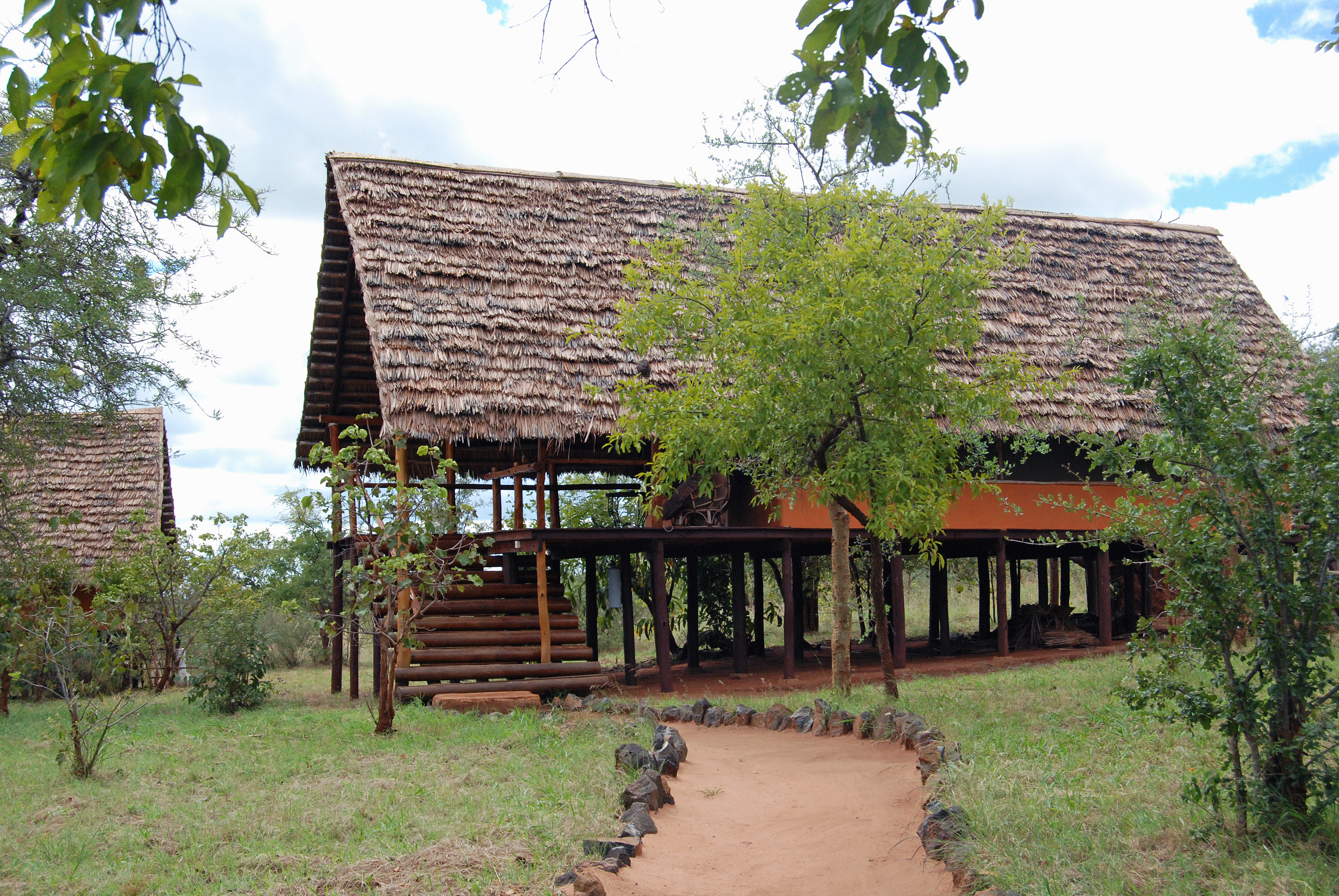
Kikoti Safari Camp in Tarangire National Park, Tanzania.

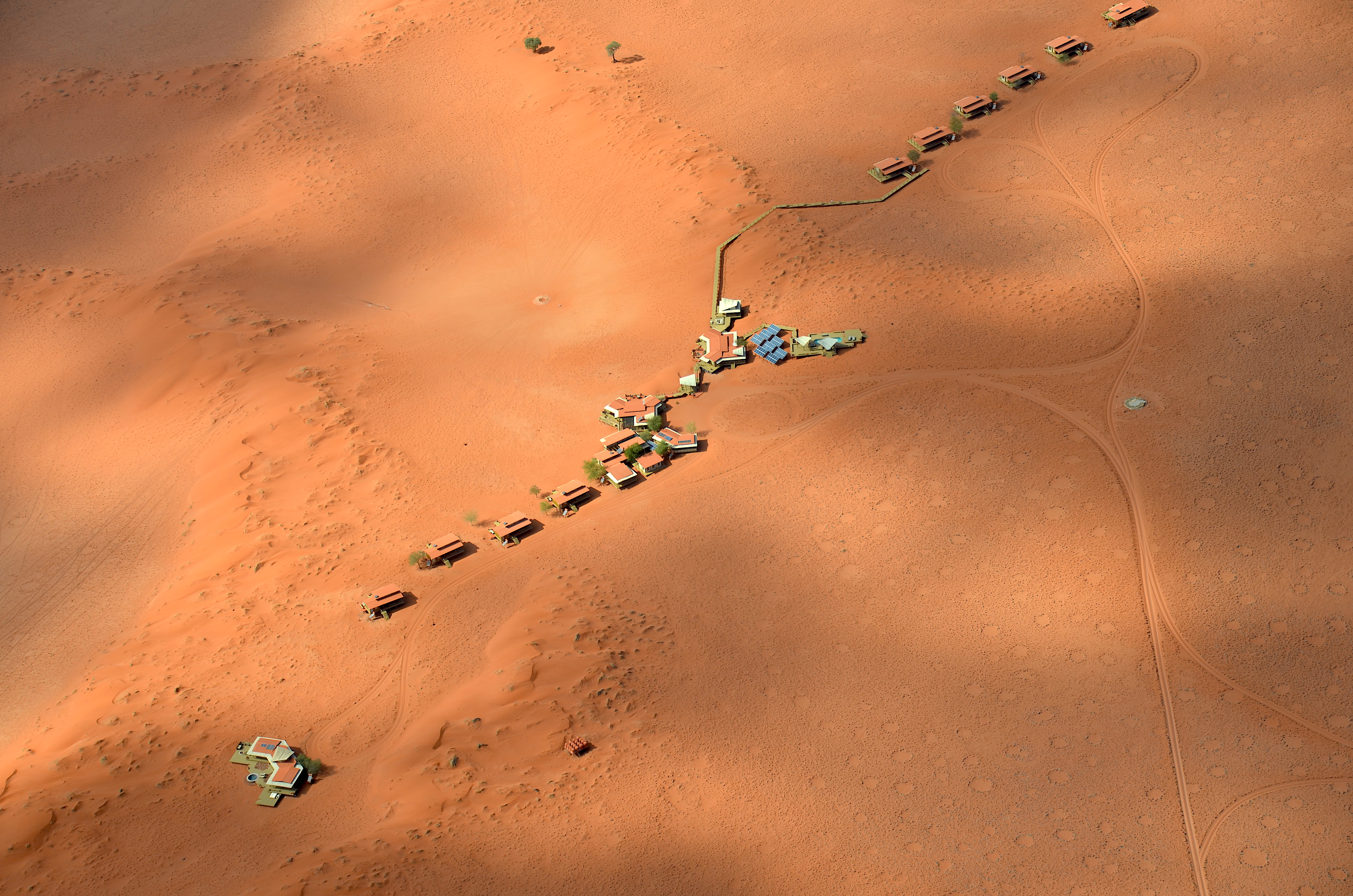
Luxury lodge Wolwedans Dunes Lodge in Namibia

A safari lodge (also known as a game lodge) is a type of tourist accommodation in southern and eastern Africa. Lodges are mainly used by tourists on wildlife safaris, and are typically located in or near national parks or game reserves.

Lodges are usually in isolated rural areas, and offer meals and activities such as game drives, in addition to accommodation. The standard of accommodation varies considerably, from rustic bush camps, sometimes tented, to luxury lodges with the character of upmarket hotels. Unlike hotels or pensions, which typically consist of houses with many rooms, the dwellings in lodges are often in separate buildings with a bedroom, a bathroom, a terrace and sometimes a small kitchen. The set is closed to ensure the safety of tourists.
