= Klaserie Game Reserve =

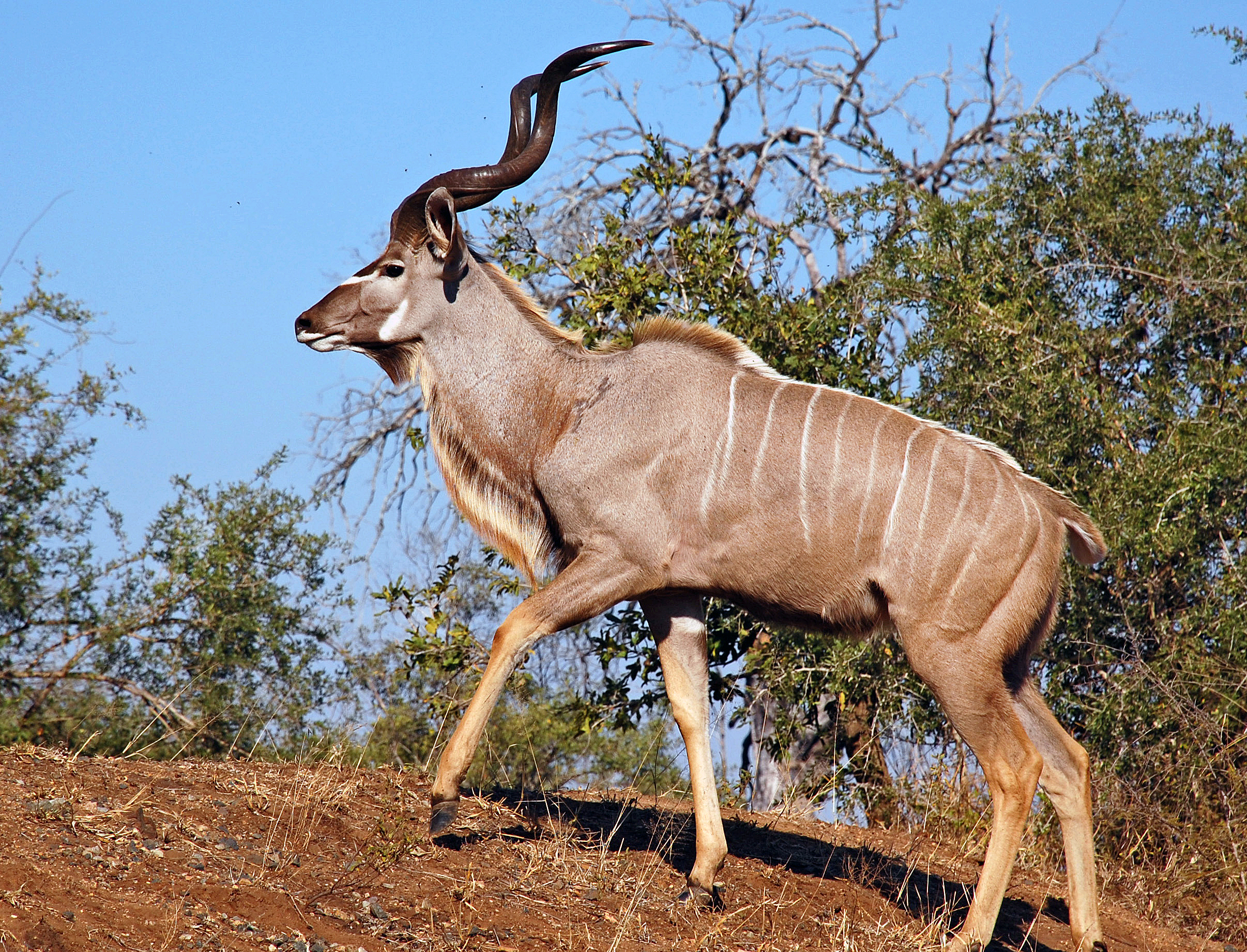
- Greater kudu in Kruger Park

- Location within South Africa
- Location: Limpopo, South Africa
- Nearest city: Hoedspruit
- Coordinates: 24°15′00″S 31°13′00″E
- Area: 57,918 hectares (579.18 km^{2})
- Website: www.klaserie.co.za

Klaserie Game Reserve is a privately owned game reserve adjacent to Kruger National Park and Timbavati Game Reserve, in the Limpopo province of South Africa. It has an area of 57,918 ha (579.18 km^{2}) and is traversed by the Klaserie River.

== Wildlife ==
Wildlife species include the lion, elephant, white rhinoceros, African leopard, southeast African cheetah, African wild dog, spotted hyena, Cape buffalo, and many antelope species.

== See also ==
- Protected areas of South Africa
