= Timbavati Private Nature Reserve =

Nature reserve in South Africa

- African leopard at Tanda Tula Camp

- Location within Mpumalanga
- Location: Mpumalanga, South Africa
- Nearest city: Nelspruit
- Coordinates: 24°20′07″S 31°20′38″E
- Area: 534 square kilometres (206 sq mi)
- Established: 1956
- Website: www.timbavati.co.za

Timbavati Private Nature Reserve is a nature reserve on the western edge of Kruger National Park in Mpumalanga Province, South Africa. It was established in 1956 by like-minded game farmers with the creation of the Timbavati Association. The association has 50 members and covers 534 km^{2} (206 sq mi). Timbavati Private Nature Reserve harbours many animals among which the Big Five as well as numerous antelope species.

== History ==
In 1956, a group of conservation minded landowners formed the Timbavati Association with the aim to reclaim the land for the benefit of all. They had come together after witnessing the degradation of a once pristine wilderness area.

Insensitive land use (primarily crop and cattle farming) had caused soil erosion and destruction of indigenous plant species. In addition, natural water sources had been rerouted by dams further impacting on the natural status quo. As a result, much of the wildlife common to the area was lost.

Since the formation of the Timbavati Association, every landowner in the area has been encouraged to join in the conservation effort. Today there are over 50 members who have succeeded in restoring the land to its former glory, with diverse and rare wildlife species making the Timbavati their home.

In 1993, in recognition of the importance of the area, the fences between the Kruger National Park and the Timbavati Reserve were removed to encourage natural species migration.

Man's incursions into this part of the Lowveld have always been temporary and brief, from early stone age down to the early 20th century. In point of fact, large tracts of land in the northern portion of the Lowveld were never permanently settled by man. The lands now comprising the Timbavati were barely touched, and are still only lightly inhabited. This part of South Africa's bushveld region may therefore be regarded as truly unspoiled and deserves recognition as genuine wild land, as opposed to the "restored" and "restocked" lands commonly found elsewhere.

== Geography ==
Timbavati Nature Reserve is located in the Mpumalanga province of South Africa between latitudes 24° 34’ S and 24° 03’ S and longitudes 31° 03’ E and 31° 31’ E. The Timbavati Reserve consists of 50 contiguous tracts of land housing 12 luxury tourist lodges.

The reserve forms part of the Greater Kruger National Park and lies nestled between the Kruger National Park on the east, the Klaserie and Umbabat Game Reserves in the north and the Thornybush Game Reserve in the west. There are no fences between the Timbavati and the Kruger National Park which allows free movement of wildlife between the reserves. The world-famous Kruger National Park is a conservation area of more than 20,000 km^{2} (7,700 sq mi).

The southern border of this great complex of public and privately owned protected land lies close to the Kingdom of Eswatini and abuts the boundaries of Zimbabwe in the north and Mozambique in the east.

The terrain is undulating with altitudes varying between 300 and 500m above sea level. The area is characterised as 'savanna bushveld' with 6 different landscape types: acacia woodland, open woodland, mopane woodland, combretum woodland, mixed combretum woodland and mixed veld on Gabbro. Bush elephants, African buffaloes, kudu, Burchell's zebras, blue wildebeests, Cape giraffes, impalas, waterbucks and warthogs abound together with their attendant predators including lions, African leopards, South African cheetahs and spotted hyena. The endangered Cape wild dog is also a regular visitor to the Timbavati Game Reserve. The larger and rarer antelopes such as roan antelope, common eland and tsessebe have been slow to return to this area and their numbers are still critically low.

The climate is typified by a summer wet season from October to March with the majority of rain falling between December and February. This is also the hottest time of the year, with temperatures in the region of 32 °C. A typical summer day will be hot with storm clouds gathering for a spectacular late afternoon thunderstorm.

During the winter months (April–September) the weather is dry with little chance of rain. As game tends to congregate around dwindling water sources, game viewing is more predictable. Temperatures can range from 28 °C to 10 °C in one day. The mornings and evenings can be very cold and warm clothing is very strongly recommended.

== Flora and fauna ==
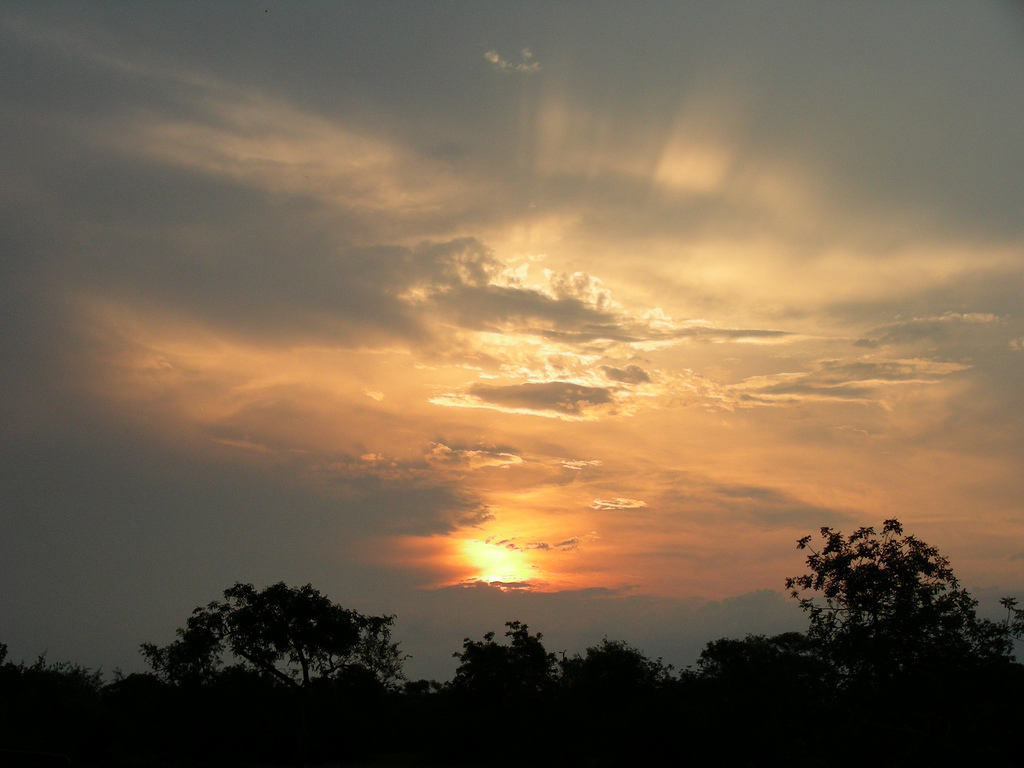
Sunset over Timbavati Game Reserve

Timbavati is home to over 40 mammals, more than 79 species of reptiles, 49 species of fish and 85 species of trees.

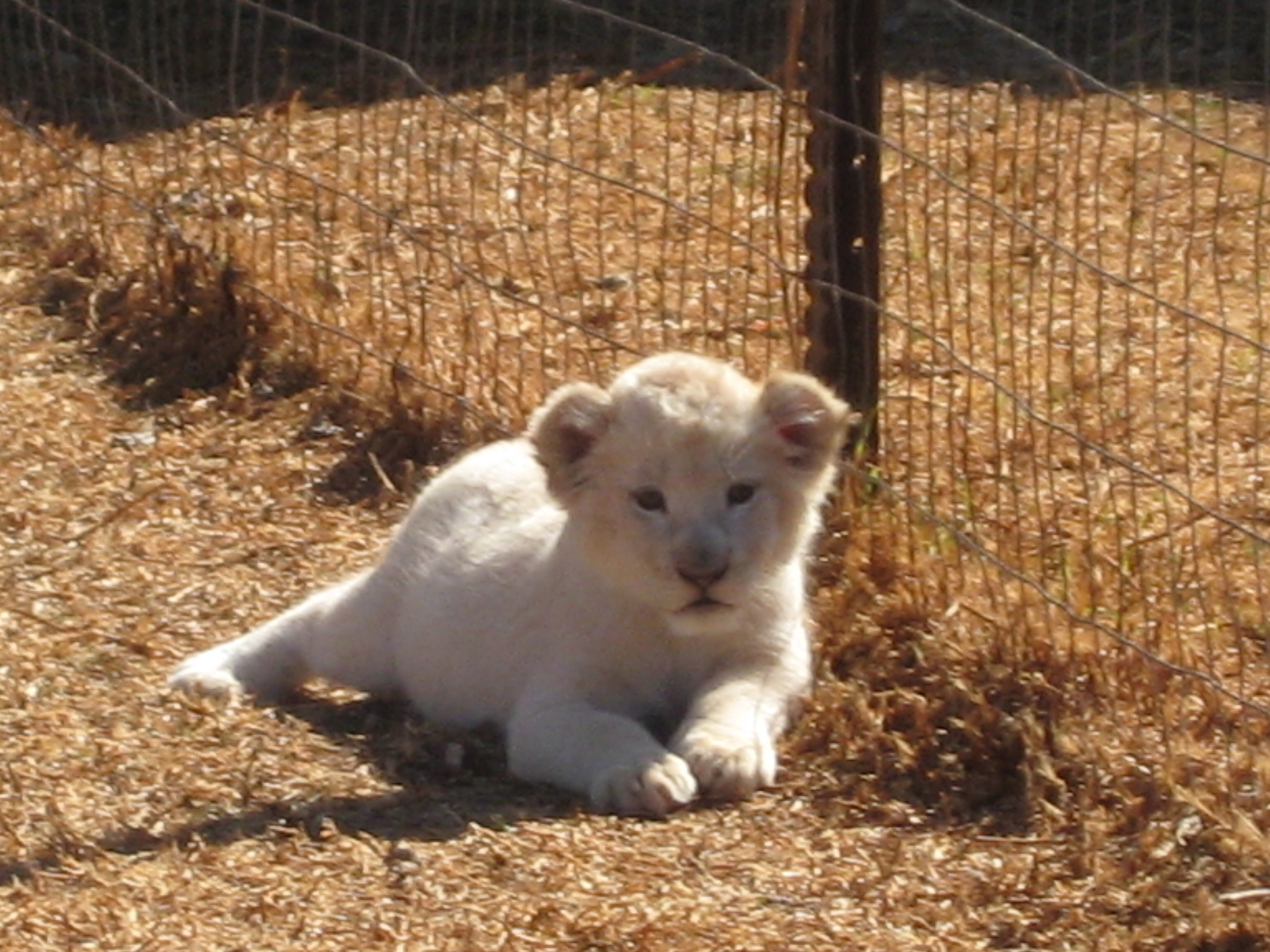
A white lion cub at Kromdraai, South Africa

When the white lions of the Timbavati were discovered in the mid-1970s, they became the subject of much interest and debate. Lions reappeared in Timbavati in 2006 after an absence of many years.

== Disease ==
As part of the Greater Kruger ecosystem, Timbavati Private Nature Reserve is affected by several wildlife diseases that occur naturally in southern Africa. One of the most significant is bovine tuberculosis (Mycobacterium bovis), which was first identified in African buffalo populations in the adjacent Kruger National Park in 1990. The disease has since spread to neighbouring private reserves within the Greater Kruger landscape, including Timbavati, and has been detected in multiple mammal species through spillover transmission.

Wildlife within the reserve is also susceptible to tick-borne diseases, including infections caused by species of Anaplasma, Babesia, Theileria, and Rickettsia. A molecular survey conducted between 2021 and 2024 detected these pathogens in wildlife sampled from Timbavati and several other South African protected areas, highlighting the importance of ongoing disease surveillance to reduce the risk of transmission between wildlife, livestock, and humans.

The reserve also implements malaria control measures for staff and visitors. Owing to the low human population density within Timbavati and annual vector-control programmes, relatively few human malaria cases are reported each year.

== See also ==
- Associated Private Nature Reserves
- Kruger National Park
- Protected areas of South Africa
- Timbavati River
- White lion
- Mia and the White Lion
