= Botswana Institute of Administration and Commerce =

Public university in Gaborone, Botswana

- Institut d'administration et du commerce du Botswana
- Type: Public Institute
- Established: 1964
- Director: A. V. Mokobi
- Location: Gaborone, Botswana; 24.665170°S 25.935713°E
- Language: English
- Website: biac.gov.bw

The Botswana Institute of Administration and Commerce (BIAC) is a public university institution located in Gaborone, the capital of Botswana.

== History ==
The Botswana Institute of Administration and Commerce, also known as the Botswana Training Centre, was founded in 1964 following the merger of the Trade School and the Public Works Department Training Organisation. The institute has been known by its current name since 1980.

== Composition ==
The Botswana Institute of Administration and Commerce is composed of five faculties:

- Faculty of Accounting
- Faculty of Computer Science
- Faculty of Public Administration
- Faculty of Secretarial Studies
- Faculty of Communication and Public Relations
