= List of South Africans =

Flag of South Africa

This is a list of notable and famous South Africans who are the subjects of Wikipedia articles.

== Academics ==
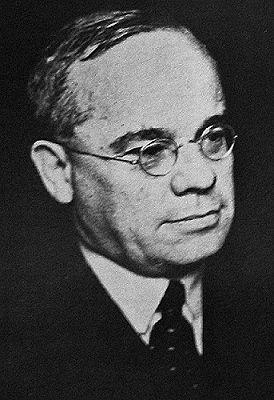
Jan Hendrik Hofmeyr

=== Academics ===
- Shulamith Behr, art historian (1946–2023)
- Estian Calitz, academic (born 1949)
- Jakes Gerwel, academic and anti-apartheid activist (1946–2012)
- Adam Habib, political scientist (born 1965)
- Jan Hendrik Hofmeyr, academic and politician (1894–1948)
- Thamsanqa Kambule, South African mathematician and educator (1921–2009)
- Loren Kruger, academic and author (born 1958)
- Tshilidzi Marwala, academic and businessman (born 1971)
- Revil Mason, archeologist (1929–2020)
- Shula Marks, historian (born 1938)
- Njabulo Ndebele, Principal of the University of Cape Town (born 1948)
- D. C. S. Oosthuizen, philosopher (1926–1968)
- Adriaan N. P. Pelzer, historian and Vice-Principal University Pretoria (1915–1981)
- Michiel Daniel Overbeek, South African amateur astronomer and prolific variable star observers (1920–2001)
- Pierre de Villiers Pienaar, pioneering role in speech language therapy and lexicography in South Africa (1904–1978)
- Calie Pistorius, academic and Principal of the University of Pretoria (born 1958)
- Milton Shain, academic and professor of Modern Jewish history at the University of Cape Town (born 1949)
- Benedict Wallet Vilakazi, author, educator, and first black South African to receive a PhD (1906–1947)
- David Webster, anthropologist (1945–1989)

=== Medical and veterinary ===
- Abraham Manie Adelstein, UK Chief Medical Statistician (1916–1992)
- Christiaan Barnard, pioneering heart surgeon (1922–2001)
- Wouter Basson, medical scientist (born 1950)
- John Borthwick, veterinary surgeon in the Cape Colony (1867–1936)
- Mary Malahlela, first black woman to register as a medical doctor in South Africa (1916–1981)
- Joan Morice, first female veterinary surgeon in South Africa (1904–1944)
- Anna Coutsoudis, public health scientist (born 1952)
- Patrick Soon-Shiong, surgeon, founder Abraxis BioScience, billionaire (born 1952)
- Arnold Theiler, veterinarian (1867–1936)
- Max Theiler, virologist, 1951 Nobel Prize winner (1899–1972)
- Lindiwe Sidali, surgeon (born 1984)

=== Scientists ===
- Andrew Geddes Bain, geologist (1797–1864)
- Peter Beighton, geneticist (1934–2023)
- Wilhelm Bleek, linguist (1827–1875)
- Robert Broom, palaeontologist (1866–1951)
- Sydney Brenner, biologist, 2002 Physiology or Medicine Nobel Prize winner (1927–2019)
- Phillip Clancey, ornithologist (1918–2001)
- Allan McLeod Cormack, physicist (1924–1998)
- Zodwa Dlamini, biochemist
- Clement Martyn Doke, linguist (1893–1980)
- Mulalo Doyoyo, professor and inventor (born 1970)
- Edward Stuart Cardinal Dyke, botanist, (1872–1915)
- Alexander du Toit, geologist (1878–1948)
- Robert Allen Dyer, botanist (1900–1987)
- Melville Edelstein, sociologist, killed due to Soweto uprising (1919–1976)
- Wendy Foden, conservation biologist
- J. W. B. Gunning, zoologist (1860–1913)
- Quarraisha Abdool Karim, Associate Scientific Director of the Centre for the AIDS Programme of Research in South Africa (CAPRISA) (born 1960)
- Salim Abdool Karim, South African epidemiologist and infectious diseases specialist (born 1960)
- David Lewis-Williams, archaeologist (born 1934)
- Lucy Lloyd, anthropologist (1834–1914)
- Thebe Medupe, astrophysicist (born 1973)
- Hans Merensky, geologist (1871–1952)
- Godfrey Mzamane, novelist, literary historian, academic and intellectual pioneer (1909–1977)
- Dumisani Mzamane, medical doctor, South Africa's first black nephrologist (1932–1997)
- Joab Mzamane, agriculturalist (1920–1989)
- Mabel Nevill, human computer (1865–1958)
- Austin Roberts, zoologist (1883–1948)
- Peter Sarnak, mathematician (born 1953)
- Ramotholo Sefako, astrophysicist (born 1971)
- Buyisiwe Sondezi, physicist (born 1976)
- Basil Schonland, physicist (1896–1972)
- J. L. B. Smith, ichthyologist (1897–1968)
- Phillip Tobias, palaeontologist (1925–2012)

=== Theologians ===
Also see: Prelates, clerics and evangelists

- David Bosch (1929–1992)
- John W. de Gruchy (born 1939)
- Dion Forster (born 1972)
- Johan Heyns (1928–1994)

== Writers ==
=== Authors ===
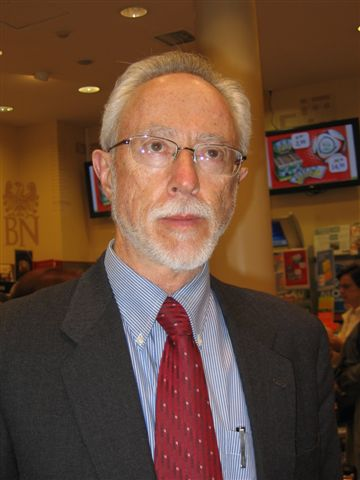
J. M. Coetzee

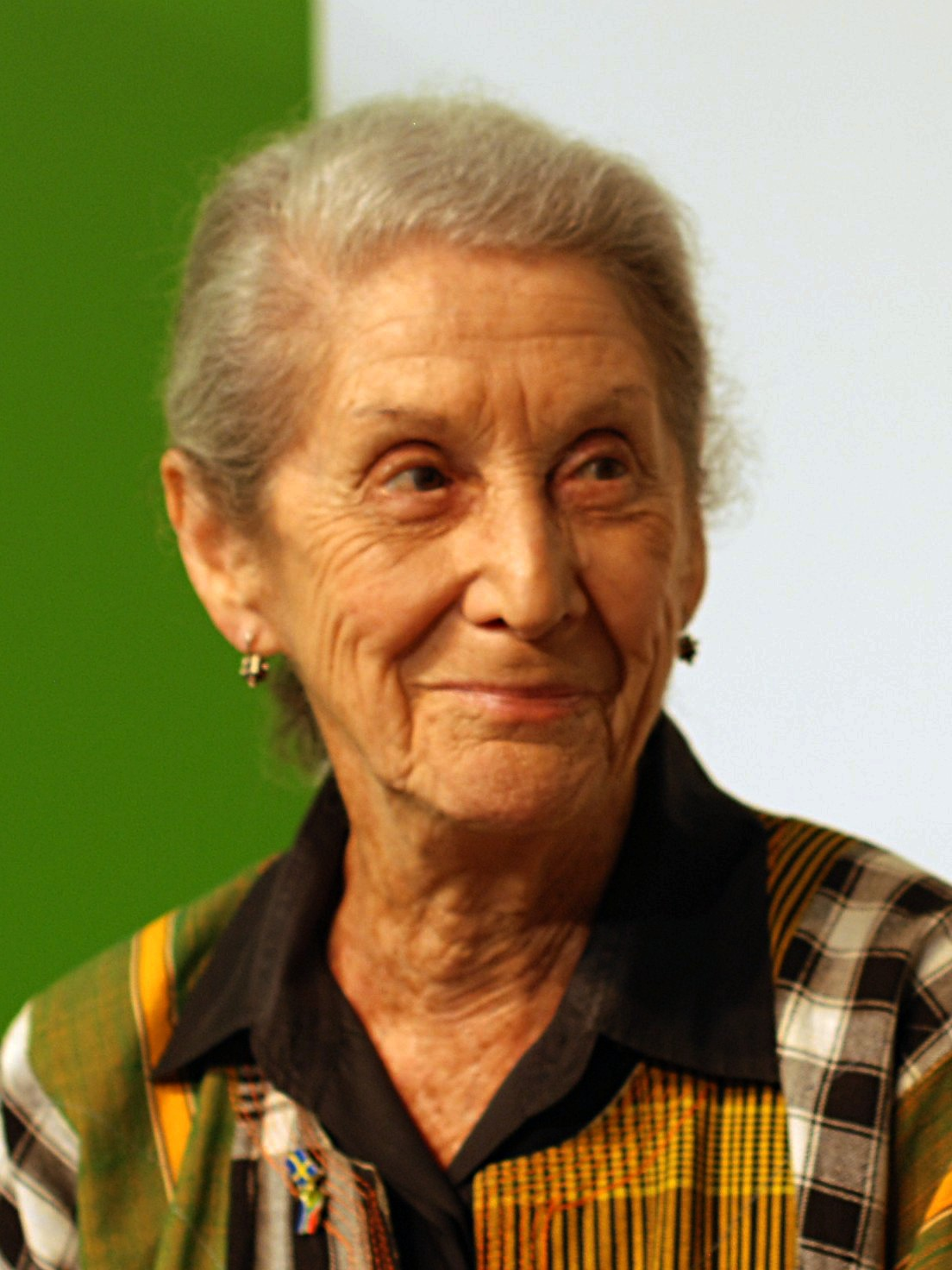
Nadine Gordimer

- Lady Anne Barnard, travel writer and artist (1750–1825)
- Herman Charles Bosman, author (1905–1951)
- André Brink, author (1935–2015)
- Justin Cartwright, novelist (1943–2018)
- J. M. Coetzee, 2003 Nobel Prize-winning author (born 1940)
- K. Sello Duiker, novelist (1974–2005)
- Sir Percy FitzPatrick, writer, businessman and politician (1862–1931)
- Graeme Friedman, author and clinical psychologist
- Damon Galgut, author (born 1963)
- Nadine Gordimer, 1991 Nobel Prize-winning author (1923–2014)
- Alfred Hutchinson, South African author, teacher and activist (1924–1972)
- C. J. Langenhoven, writer and poet (1873–1932)
- Pule Lechesa, essayist, literary critic, and poet (born 1976)
- Kgotso Pieter David Maphalla, the Sesotho language writer (1955–2021)
- Dalene Matthee, author (1938–2005)
- Gcina Mhlope, author, storyteller, playwright, director, actor (born 1959)
- Deon Meyer, author (born 1958)
- Phaswane Mpe, novelist (1970–2004)
- Sizwe Mpofu-Walsh, author and musician (born 1989)
- Alan Paton, author (1903–1988)
- Margaret Roberts, herbalist and writer (1937–2017)
- Karel Schoeman, novelist and historian (1939–2017)
- Olive Schreiner, author (1855–1920)
- Mongane Wally Serote, poet and writer (born 8 May 1944)
- Wilbur Smith, novelist (1933–2021)
- J. R. R. Tolkien, author of The Lord of The Rings (1892–1973)
- Etienne van Heerden, novelist (born 1956)
- Marlene van Niekerk, novelist (born 1954)
- Lyall Watson, writer (1939–2008)
- David Yudelman, writer
- Rachel Zadok, London-based South African writer (born 1972)

=== Editors ===
- Kojo Baffoe, magazine editor (born 1972)
- Khanyi Dhlomo, magazine editor (born 1975)
- Laurence Gandar, Rand Daily Mail editor (1915–1998)
- Niel Hammann, editor of magazines (born 1937)
- John Tengo Jabavu, political activist and newspaper editor (1859–1921)
- Aggrey Klaaste, journalist and editor (1940–2004)
- Max du Preez, newspaper editor (born 1951)

=== Poets ===
See also: South African poets and Afrikaans language poets

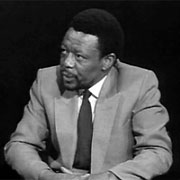
Mongane Wally Serote

- Roy Campbell, poet (1901–1957)
- Judy Croome, poet (born 1958)
- Sheila Cussons, poet (1922–2004)
- Jonty Driver (1939–2023)
- Jakob Daniël du Toit, poet a.k.a. Totius (1877–1953)
- Elisabeth Eybers, poet (1915–2007)
- Stephen Gray, writer and poet (1941–2020)
- Ingrid Jonker, poet (1933–1965)
- Moira Lovell, poet, playwright and literary critic (born 1951)
- Antjie Krog, poet, novelist and playwright (born 1952)
- Laurence Lerner, poet (1925–2016)
- Lucas Malan, Afrikaans academic and poet (1946–2010)
- Chris Mann, poet (1948–2021)
- Eugène Nielen Marais, poet, writer, lawyer and naturalist (1871–1936)
- Michael Mosoeu Moerane, first black South African to write a symphonic poem, choral music composer and maternal uncle to Thabo Mbeki (1904–1980)
- Thomas Pringle, poet and journalist (1789–1834)
- N.S. Puleng, poet and author (born 1958)
- N. P. van Wyk Louw, poet (1906–1970)
- Mongane Wally Serote, poet, activist and politician (born 1944)
- Stephen Watson, poet (1954–2011)

=== Journalists ===
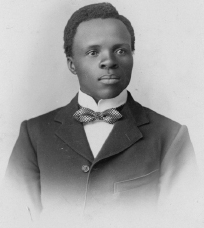
Sol Plaatje

- Jani Allan, journalist and radio personality (born 1953)
- George Claassen, journalist (born 1949)
- Robyn Curnow, CNN television reporter and anchor
- John Charles Daly, television journalist, executive and game show host (1914–1991)
- Arnold S de Beer, journalist and academic (1942–2021)
- Frene Ginwala, journalist and politician (1932–2023)
- Arthur Goldstuck, journalist (born 1959)
- Devi Sankaree Govender, investigative journalist (born 1972)
- Niel Hammann, journalist (born 1937)
- Noni Jabavu, journalist, editor and first black South African woman to publish an autobiography (1919–2008)
- Archibald Campbell Jordan (1906–1968)
- Lara Logan, CBS television reporter/correspondent (born 1971)
- Peter Magubane, South African photographer (1932–2024)
- Leanne Manas, television journalist and anchor (born 1974)
- John Matisonn, print and radio journalist for both South African and United States broadcasters (born 1949)
- Zakes Mda, journalist (born 1948)
- Nathaniel Ndazana Nakasa, South African journalist and short story writer (1937–1965)
- Sam Nzima, South African photographer, who took the image of Hector Pieterson for the Soweto uprising (1934–2018)
- Henry Nxumalo, investigative journalist under apartheid (1917–1957)
- Sol Plaatje, journalist and political activist (1877–1932)
- Percy Qoboza, journalist, editorial writer, and political activist (1938–1988)
- Barry Streek, journalist, political activist, author, parliamentary media manager (1948–2006)
- Redi Tlhabi, journalist and broadcaster (born 1978)
- Eric Lloyd Williams, journalist and war correspondent (1915–1988)
- Donald Woods, journalist and anti-apartheid activist (1933–2001)

== Artists ==
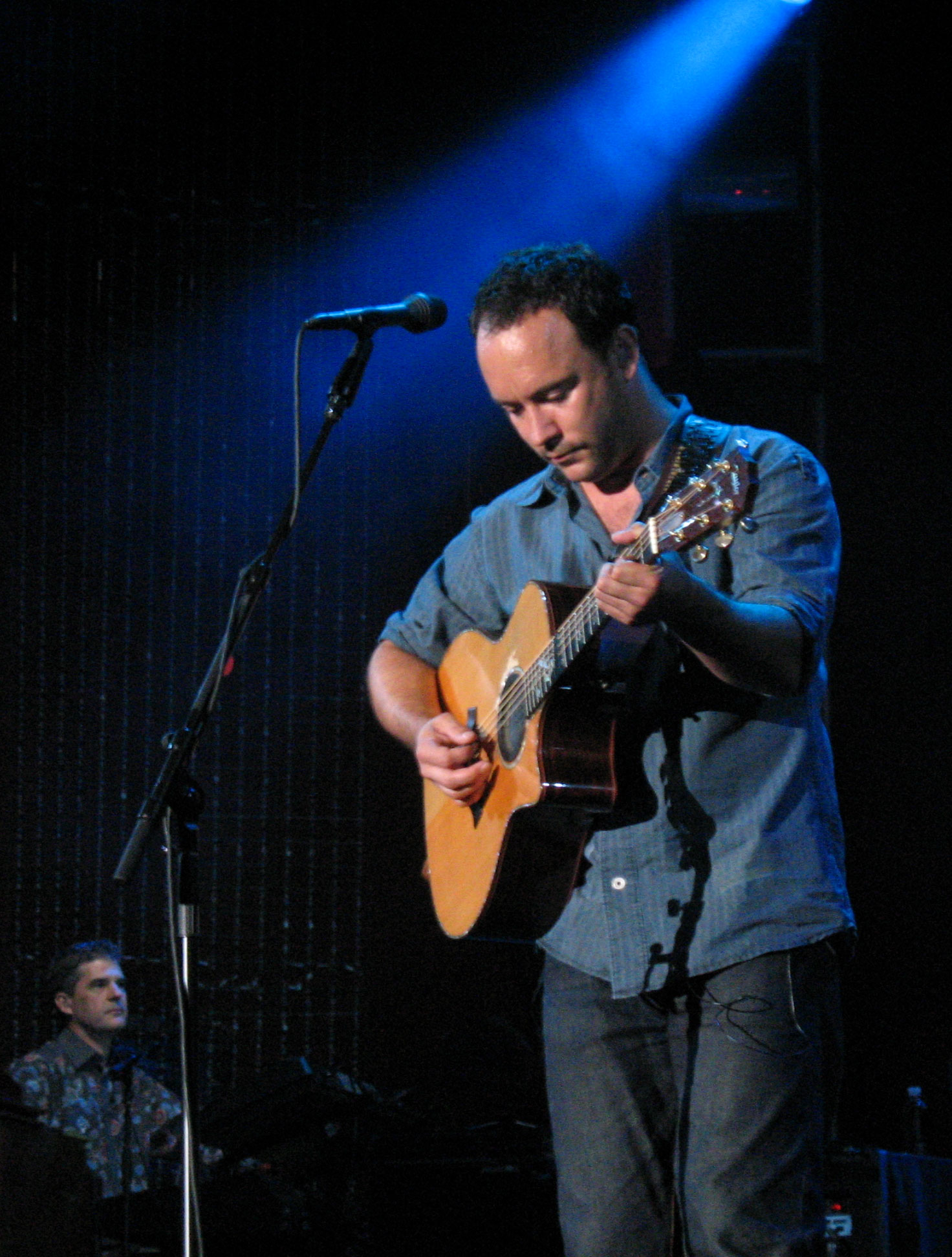
Dave Matthews

=== Performing artists ===
==== Actors and actresses ====
- Anel Alexander, actress, producer (born 1979)
- Ayanda Borotho, actress (born 1981)
- Ivan Botha, actor (born 1984)
- Lesley-Ann Brandt, South African born actress (born 1981), notable for her role as Mazikeen in the show Lucifer
- Kai Luke Brümmer, actor (born 1993)
- Peter Cartwright, actor (1935–2013)
- Baby Cele, actress (born 1972)
- Presley Chweneyagae, actor (1984–2025)
- Sharlto Copley, actor, (District 9) (born 1973)
- Katlego Danke, actress (born 1978)
- Embeth Davidtz, actress (born 1965)
- Gopala Davies, actor and director (born 1988)
- Jack Devnarain, actor (born 1971)
- Ryan de Villiers, actor (born 1992)
- Sindi Dlathu, actress (born 1974)
- Pallance Dladla, actor (born 1992)
- Lillian Dube, South African actress (born 1945)
- Vinette Ebrahim, actress (born 1957)
- Kim Engelbrecht, actress (born 1980)
- Willie Esterhuizen, actor
- Connie Ferguson, actress (born 1970)
- Shona Ferguson, actor (1972–2021)
- Brett Goldin, actor (1977–2006)
- Zoe Gail, actress (1920–2020)
- Gugu Gumede, actress (born 1991)
- Roxane Hayward, actress (born 1991)
- Hennie Jacobs, actor (born 1981)
- David James, actor, stage, television, and film actor (born 1972)
- Sid James, film and television actor (1913–1976)
- Glynis Johns, actress (1923–2024)
- Adhir Kalyan, actor (born 1983)
- Atandwa Kani, actor (born 1984)
- John Kani, actor, entertainer and writer (born 1943)
- Dawn Thandeka King, actress (born 1977)
- Shannon Kook (born 1987)
- Paballo Koza, actor (born 2002)
- Alice Krige, actress (born 1954)
- Deon Lotz, actor (born 1964)
- Sello Maake Ka-Ncube, actor (born 1960)
- Gail Mabalane, actress (born 1984)
- Joe Mafela, actor, writer and singer (1942–2017)
- Maps Maponyane, actor (born 1990)
- Warren Masemola, actor (born 1983)
- Khanyi Mbau, radio and television personality and actress (born 1985), notable for Happiness Is a Four-letter Word
- Nomzamo Mbatha, actress (born 1990)
- Michelle Mosalakae, actress (born 1994)
- Thuso Mbedu, actress (born 1991)
- Sean Michael, (born 1969)
- Enhle Mbali Mlotshwa, actress (born 1988)
- Masoja Msiza, actor (born 1964)
- Patrick Mynhardt, actor (1932–2007)
- Themba Ndaba, actor (born 1965)
- Menzi Ngubane, actor (born 1967)
- Jessica Nkosi, actress (born 1990)
- Kenneth Nkosi, actor (born 1973)
- Winnie Ntshaba, actress (born 1975)
- Winston Ntshona, actor (1941–2018)
- Nandi Nyembe, South African actress (born 1950)
- Tarina Patel, actor (born 1986]
- Madelaine Petsch, actress (born 1994)
- Terry Pheto, actress (born 1981)
- Tanit Phoenix, actress (Death Race: Inferno, Lord of War, Safe House, Femme Fatales, Mad Buddies) (born 1984)
- Sasha Pieterse, actress (born 1996)
- Sandra Prinsloo, South African actress (born 1947), The Gods Must Be Crazy, Quest for Love
- Ama Qamata, actress (born 1998)
- Basil Rathbone, actor (1892–1967)
- Jo-anne Reyneke, actress (born 1988)
- Ian Roberts, actor, playwright, singer (born 1952)
- Angelique Rockas pioneer of multi-racial theatre in the UK (born 1951)
- Buhle Samuels
- Stelio Savante, actor (born 1970)
- Clive Scott, actor (1937–2021)
- Rapulana Seiphemo, actor (born 1967)
- Cliff Severn, actor (1925–2014)
- Raymond Severn, actor (1930–1994)
- Antony Sher, actor, author and painter (1949–2021)
- Cliff Simon, actor (1962–2021)
- William Smith, TV teacher and presenter (born 1939)
- Linda Sokhulu, actress (born 1976)
- Shaleen Surtie-Richards, actress (1955–2021)
- Janet Suzman, actress (born 1939)
- Reine Swart, actress, producer
- Charlize Theron, actress (born 1975)
- Pearl Thusi, actress, model, MC (born 1988)
- Siyabonga Thwala, actor (born 1969)
- Chioma Umeala, South African-Nigerian actress (born 1996)
- Pieter-Dirk Uys, political satirist and entertainer (born 1945)
- Brümilda van Rensburg, actress (born 1956)
- Musetta Vander, actress (born 1969)
- Arnold Vosloo, actor (born 1962), The Mummy, The Mummy Returns, 24

==== Dancers ====
- Juliet Prowse, dancer (1936–1996)
- Bontle Modiselle, dancer (born 1990)

==== Playwrights and film directors ====
- Neill Blomkamp, director, District 9 (born 1979)
- Charles J. Fourie, playwright (born 1965)
- Athol Fugard, playwright (1932–2025)
- Ronald Harwood, playwright and writer (1934–2020)
- Oliver Hermanus, film director and writer (born 1983)
- Gray Hofmeyr South African film director (born 1949)
- Gavin Hood, film director, wrote and directed the Academy Award-winning Tsotsi (2005) (born 1963)
- Rob De Mezieres, film director and writer
- Jyoti Mistry, film director, installation artist and scholar (born 1970)
- Mbongeni Ngema, playwright, actor, choreographer and director (born 1955)
- Michael Oblowitz film director (born 1952)
- Mthuli ka Shezi, playwright and political activist (1947–1972)
- Leon Schuster, filmmaker, comedian, actor and prankster (born 1951)
- Jamie Uys, film director (1921–1996)

==== Singers, musicians and composers ====
- AKA (rapper), South African Kiernan Forbes (1988–2023)
- Zain Bhikha, world-renowned singer-songwriter of the Nasheed genre
- Michael Blake, classical composer (born 1951)
- Johan Botha, opera singer (1965–2016)
- Al Bowlly, popular singer (1898–1941)
- Don Clarke, singer-songwriter (born 1955)
- Johnny Clegg, musician (1953–2019)
- Mimi Coertse, opera singer (born 1932)
- Fanie de Jager, operatic tenor (born 1949)
- Lucky Dube, reggae singer (1964–2007)
- Brenda Fassie, anti-apartheid Afropop singer-songwriter, dancer and activist (1964–2004)
- Daniel Friedman ("Deep Fried Man"), musical comedian (born 1981)
- Steve Kekana, singer-songwriter (1958–2021)
- Jabu Khanyile, musician and lead vocalist (1957–2006)
- Claire Johnston, singer (born 1967)
- David Kramer, singer and playwright (born 1951)
- Clare Loveday, classical composer (born 1967)
- Lira (singer), singer (born 1979)
- Sipho Mabuse, singer (born 1951)
- Ringo Madlingozi, South African singer-songwriter, producer, and member of parliament (born 1964)
- Arthur Mafokate, kwaito musician and producer (born 1962)
- Winston Mankunku Ngozi, tenor sax player (1943–2009)
- Mahlathini, mbaqanga singer (1938–1999)
- Miriam Makeba, singer and civil rights activist (1932–2008)
- Rebecca Malope, multi-award-winning South African gospel singer (born 1968)
- Manfred Mann, musician (born 1940)
- Hugh Masekela, jazz trumpeter and singer (1939–2018)
- Gwendolyn Masin, violinist, author, pedagogue (born 1977)
- Lebo Mathosa, popular South African kwaito singer (1977–2006)
- Dave Matthews, leader of the Dave Matthews Band (born 1967)
- Shaun Morgan, lead singer of the award-winning band Seether (born 1978)
- Ray Phiri, jazz, fusion and Mbhaqanga musician (1947–2017)
- Aquiles Priester, drummer (born 1971)
- Rex Rabanye, jazz, fusion and soulful pop musician (1944–2010)
- Trevor Rabin, musician, composer, former member of progressive rock band Yes (born 1954)
- Koos Ras, comedian, singer, writer, composer (1928–1997)
- Charles Segal (pianist), composer, arranger, Guinness World Record holder (1929–2021)
- Enoch Sontonga, composer of national anthem (1873–1905)
- Joseph Shabalala, founder and director of Ladysmith Black Mambazo (1941–2020)
- ZP Theart, singer, ex Dragonforce (born 1975)
- Costa Titch, Amapiano rapper and dancer (1995–2023)
- Hilda Tloubatla, lead singer of Mahotella Queens (born 1942)
- Watkin Tudor Jones, rapper, performance artist, band member of Die Antwoord (born 1974)
- Tyla, R&B singer-songwriter (born 2002)
- Arnold van Wyk, classical composer (1916–1983)
- Yolandi Visser, rapper, performance artist, band member of Die Antwoord (born 1984)
- Amor Vittone, singer, performing artist and gold-disc recording artist (born 1972)
- Kevin Volans, classical composer (born 1949)
- Amira Willighagen, soprano (born 2004)

==== Models, socialites and media personalities ====
- Jani Allan, radio personality, journalist (born 1953)
- Gina Athans, model, international socialite (born 1984)
- Riaan Cruywagen, TV news reader (born 1945)
- Lasizwe Dambuza, television personality (born 1998)
- Belle Delphine, Social Media Personality (born 1999)
- Trevor Denman, horse racing announcer (born 1952)
- Minnie Dlamini, TV presenter, TV personality, model and actress (born 1990)
- Jade Fairbrother, model, fitness bikini competitor, Playboy Playmate (born 1986)
- Watkin Tudor Jones (Ninja) singer, rapper, actor, director (born 1974)
- Roxy Ingram, model (born 1982)
- Alan Khan, radio and television personality (born 1971)
- Caspar Lee, YouTube personality and actor (born 1994)
- Jeremy Maggs, journalist, radio host and television presenter (born 1961)
- Noeleen Maholwana-Sangqu, radio and TV host and philanthropist (born 1967)
- Myra Manganye, South African Reality Competition titleholder
- Jeremy Mansfield, radio and TV personality
- Maps Maponyane, media socialite, model and actor (born 1990)
- Robert Marawa, sports journalist, television and radio personality (born 1973)
- Megan McKenzie, model (born 1980)
- Trevor Noah, comedian, actor, radio and television host (born 1984)
- Debora Patta, broadcast journalist and television producer (born 1964)
- Tanit Phoenix, Sports Illustrated model and actress (born 1984)
- Lunga Shabalala, TV presenter, model and actor (born 1989)
- Linda Sibiya, radio personality, radio producer, television host, television producer and broadcaster.
- Troye Sivan, YouTube personality, actor and singer (born 1995)
- Reeva Steenkamp, model (1983–2013)
- Candice Swanepoel, Victoria's Secret model (born 1988)
- Charlize Theron, actress, film producer (born 1975)
- Lesego Tlhabi, comedian and satirist (as Coconut Kelz) (born 1988)
- Yolandi Visser singer, rapper, actor (born 1984)
- Minki van der Westhuizen, model and TV presenter (born 1984)
- Eddie Zondi, radio personality and music composer (1967–2014)

=== Visual artists ===
==== Cartoonists ====
- T.O. Honiball, cartoonist (1905–1990)
- Jeremy Nell, cartoonist (born 1979)
- Zapiro, cartoonist (born 1958)

==== Painters ====
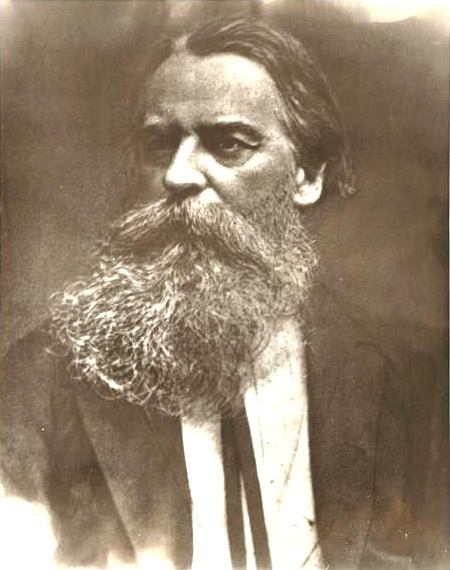
Thomas Baines

- Thomas Baines, colonial painter and explorer (1820–1875)
- Tamlin Blake, mixed media artist (born 1974)
- Leon Botha, painter and disc jockey (1985–2011)
- Garth Erasmus, visual artist (born 1956)
- Clinton Fein, artist, activist, photographer (born 1964)
- C. G. Finch-Davies, painter and ornithologist (1875–1920)
- Ronald Harrison, painter (1940–2011)
- William Kentridge, painter (born 1955)
- Maggie Laubser, painter (1886–1973)
- Neville Lewis, artist (1895–1972)
- Esther Mahlangu, painter (born 1935)
- Ernest Mancoba, avant-garde artist (1904–2002)
- Judith Mason, artist (1938–2016)
- Conor Mccreedy, artist (born 1987)
- Brett Murray, artist (born 1961)
- Charles Ernest Peers, painter (born 1875)
- George Pemba, visual artist (1912–2001)
- Pierneef, artist (1886–1957)
- Gerard Sekoto, artist and musician (1913–1993)
- Cecil Skotnes, painter (1926–2009)
- Irma Stern, painter (1894–1966)
- Vladimir Tretchikoff, painter (1913–2006)

==== Photographers ====
- Kevin Carter (1961–1994)
- Ernest Cole (1940–1990)
- Caroline Gibello (born 1974)
- David Goldblatt, photographer (1930–2018)
- Bob Gosani (1934–1972)
- Alf Kumalo (1930–2012)
- Peter Magubane (1932–2024)
- Jürgen Schadeberg (1931–2020)
- Austin Stevens (born 1951)

==== Sculptors ====
- Anton van Wouw (1862–1945)

==== Performance artists ====
- Tracey Rose (born 1974)

==== Architects ====
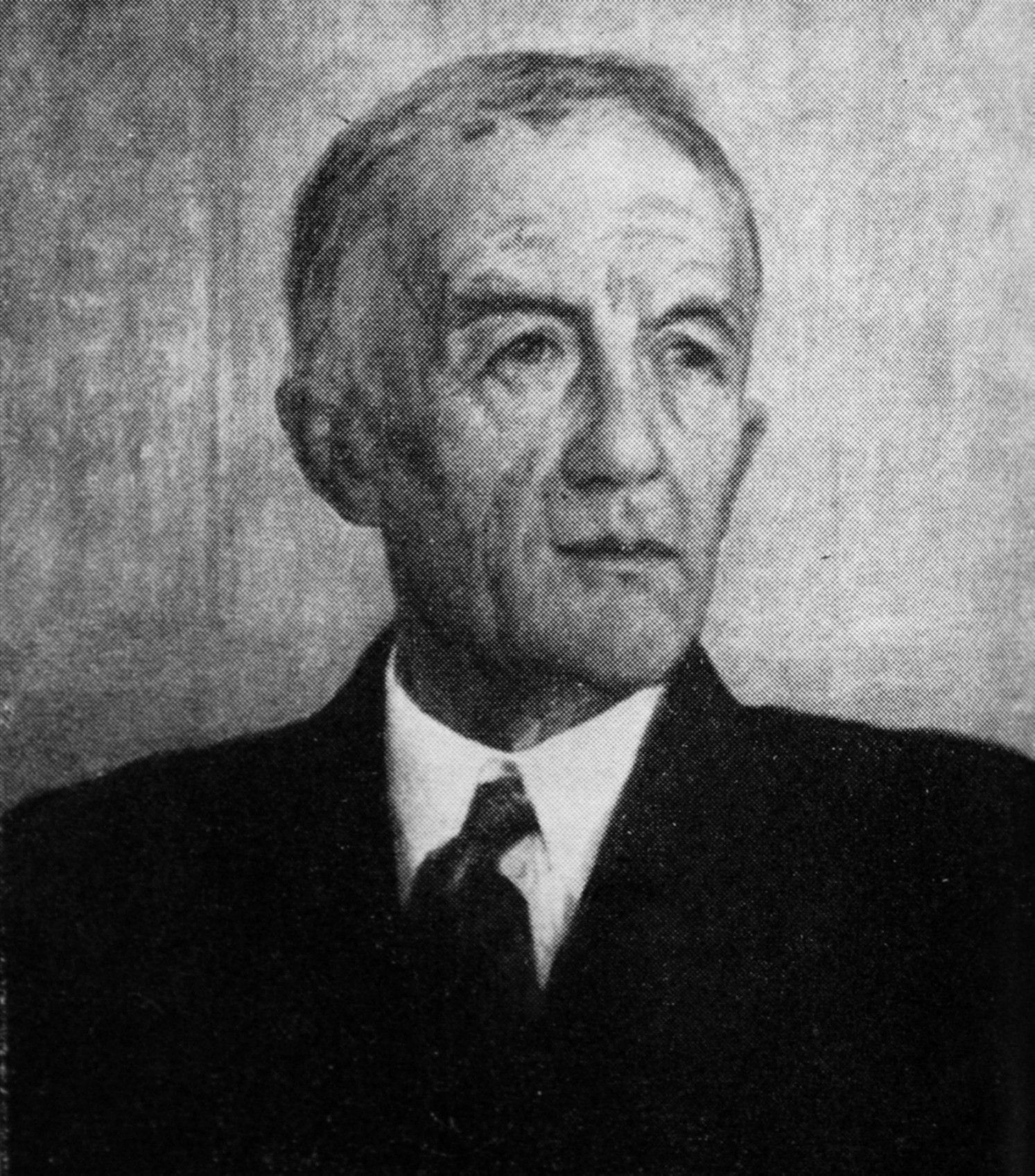
Herbert Baker, architect

- Herbert Baker (1862–1946)
- Gerard Moerdijk (1890–1958)

== Business ==
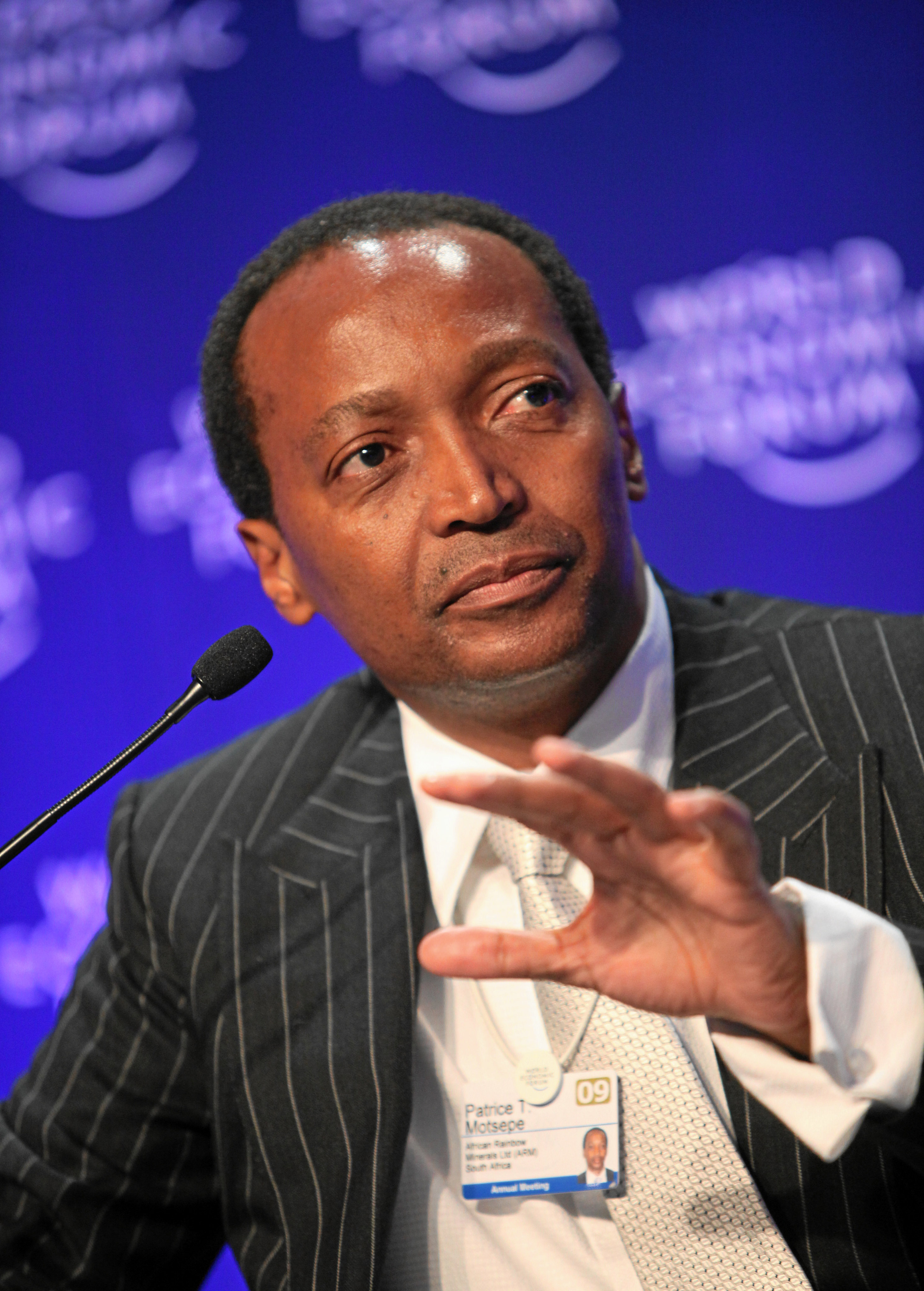
Patrice Motsepe

- Raymond Ackerman, businessman (1931–2023)
- Barney Barnato, mining magnate (1852–1897)
- Sir Bradley Fried, co-founded Grovepoint Capital, ex-CEO of Investec Bank, ex-chairman of the Court of the Bank of England (born 1965)
- Roelof Botha, venture capitalist and company director (born 1973)
- David Brink, businessman (born 1939)
- John Fairbairn, founder of Mutual Life (1794–1864)
- Vanessa Gounden, South Africa's richest businesswoman (born 1961)
- Morris Kahn, Israeli billionaire, founder and chairman of Aurec Group (born 1930)
- Sol Kerzner, South African accountant and business hotel magnate (1935–2020)
- Basetsana Kumalo, former Miss South Africa, presenter and businesswoman (born 1974)
- Gary Lubner (born 1958/1959), businessman and philanthropist
- Richard Maponya, richest business man, former owner of Maponya Mall; founder and first president of the National African Federated Chamber of Commerce (NAFCOC) (1920–2020)
- Sammy Marks, businessman (1844–1920)
- Brown Mogotsi, South African businessman
- Nthato Motlana, prominent South African businessman, physician and anti-apartheid activist (1925–2008)
- Bridgette Motsepe, businesswoman (born 1960)
- Patrice Motsepe, businessman (born 1962)
- Tshepo Motsepe, businesswoman and physician (born 1953)
- Brown Mogotsi, South African businessman
- Elon Musk, Internet and space launch entrepreneur (born 1971)
- Nicky Newton-King, first female CEO of JSE from 2012 to 2019 (born 1966)
- Ratanang Nke, company CEO, director; public prosecutor (born 1975)
- Harry Oppenheimer, businessman (1908–2000)
- William G. Pietersen, international businessman, CEO, author, professor (born 1937)
- Charles Purdon, agricultural pioneer (1838–1926)
- Mamphela Ramphele, political activist, academic, businesswoman and mother to the son of Steve Biko (born 1947)
- Cyril Ramaphosa, politician and businessman (born 1952)
- George Rex, pioneer entrepreneur of the Southern Cape (1765–1839)
- Cecil Rhodes, businessman (1853–1902)
- Anton Rupert, businessman and conservationist (1916–2006)
- Johann Rupert, businessman, son of Anton Rupert (born 1950)
- David O. Sacks, web entrepreneur (born 1972)
- Elliot Salkow, founder of Ellies Holdings, (1953–2021)
- Tokyo Sexwale, politician and businessman (born 1953)
- Mark Shuttleworth, web entrepreneur, founder of Thawte and Ubuntu Linux, space tourist (born 1973)
- Mlungisi Sisulu, South African business man (1948–2015)
- Shaka Sisulu, South African social and political activist, entrepreneur and media personality

== Legal, police and military ==
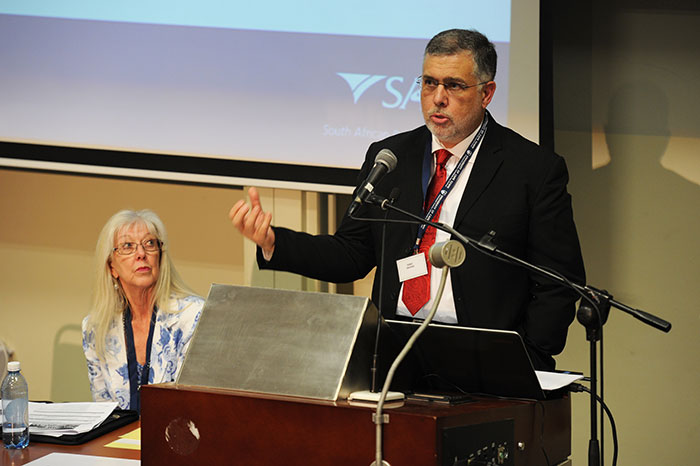
Dr Beric Croome addressing the "100 years of Taxation in South Africa" conference at University of Cape Town in 2014. Professor Roeleveld of UCT looks on.

- Lourens Ackermann, constitutional court judge (born 1934)
- Ismail Ayob, lawyer (born 1942)
- Vernon Berrangé, human rights advocate (1900–1983)
- George Bizos, lawyer (1927–2020)
- Louis Botha, Boer War General, captured Winston Churchill during the Second Boer War, also one of the signatories of the Treaty of Vereeniging (1862–1919)
- Annie Botha, philanthropist and civic leader, wife of Louis Botha
- Arthur Chaskalson, judge (1931–2012)
- Piet Cronjé, Boer general and commander-in-chief of ZAR's military forces (1840–1911)
- Beric John Croome, chartered accountant (South Africa), Advocate of the High Court of South Africa, PhD, tax law author and pioneer in taxpayers' rights in South Africa (1960–2019)
- Garnet de la Hunt, the Chief Scout of the Boy Scouts of South Africa, Vice-chairman of the Africa Scout Committee, and South African World Scout Committee (1933–2014)
- Koos de la Rey, Boer general (1847–1914)
- Pierre de Vos, constitutional law scholar (born 1963)
- Christiaan Rudolph de Wet, Boer general and acting President of the Orange Free State (1854–1922)
- Johannes Christiaan de Wet, legal academic (1912–1990)
- Bram Fischer, advocate QC and political activist (1908–1975)
- Johannes Geldenhuys, South African military commander (1935–2018)
- Ian Gleeson, South African Army officer (1934–2021)
- Richard Goldstone, ex-constitutional court judge (born 1938)
- Harold Hanson, advocate QC (1904–1973)
- John Hlophe, legal expect (1959)
- Sydney Kentridge, former advocate of the Supreme Court and Acting Justice of the Constitutional Court (born 1922)
- Mervyn E. King, former judge of the Supreme Court of South Africa and chairman of the King Committee on Corporate Governance (born 1937)
- Joel Joffe, Baron Joffe, CBE lawyer and Labour peer in the House of Lords (1932–2017)
- Pius Langa, former chief justice of constitutional court (1939–2013)
- Magnus Malan, minister of defence and chief of the South African Defence Force (1930–2011)
- Cecil Margo, judge (1915–2000)
- Richard Mdluli, head of Police Crime Intelligence (born 1958)
- Dunstan Mlambo, Judge President of the Gauteng Division of the High Court of South Africa (born 1960)
- Mogoeng Mogoeng, Chief Justice of South Africa (born 1961)
- Yvonne Mokgoro, former justice of the Constitutional Court of South Africa (1950–2024)
- Phetogo Molawa, first black female helicopter pilot in the South African Air Force and the South African National Defence Force
- Siphiwe Mvuyane, police officer (died May 1993)
- Sandile Ngcobo, former Chief Justice of South Africa (born 1953)
- Bulelani Ngcuka, director of public prosecutions (born 1954)
- Marmaduke Pattle, highest scoring Allied Air Ace of World War Two (1914–1941)
- Riah Phiyega, national police commissioner
- Vejaynand Ramlakan, South African military commander (1957–2020)
- Barry Roux, defence advocate who has represented Oscar Pistorius, Dave King and Lothar Neethling (born 1955)
- Albie Sachs, justice in constitutional court (born 1935)
- Harry Heinz Schwarz, lawyer (1924–2010)
- Jackie Selebi, national commissioner of police (1950–2015)
- Thembile Skweyiya, South African Constitutional Court judge (1939–2015)
- Percy Sonn, former head of the Directorate of Special Operations (1947–2007)
- Sir Robert Clarkson Tredgold, Chief Justice of the Federation of Rhodesia and Nyasaland (1899–1977)
- Percy Yutar, South Africa's first Jewish attorney-general and prosecutor of Nelson Mandela in the 1963 Rivonia Treason Trial (1911–2002)

== Political ==
=== Activists and trade unionists ===
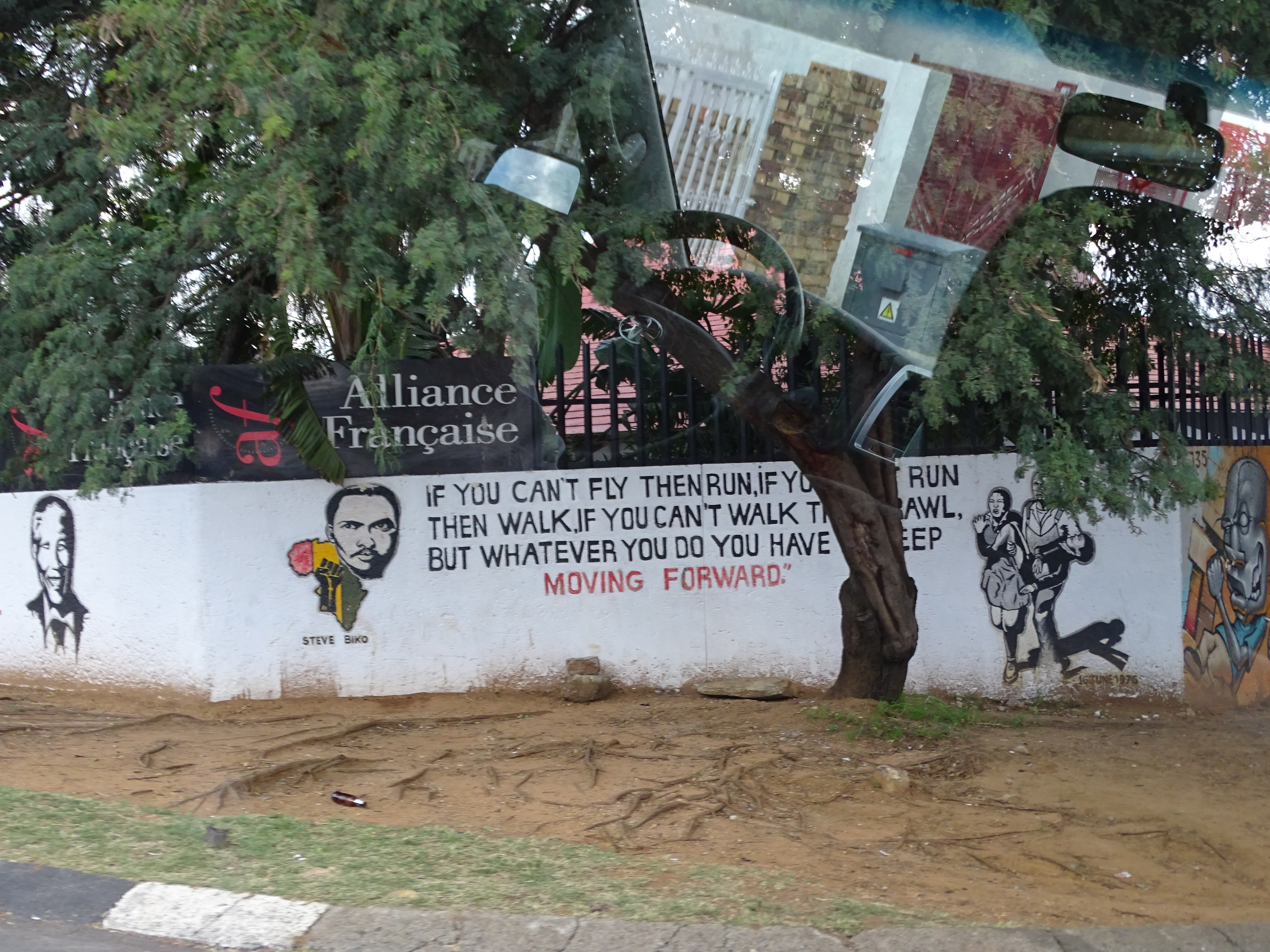
Steve Biko

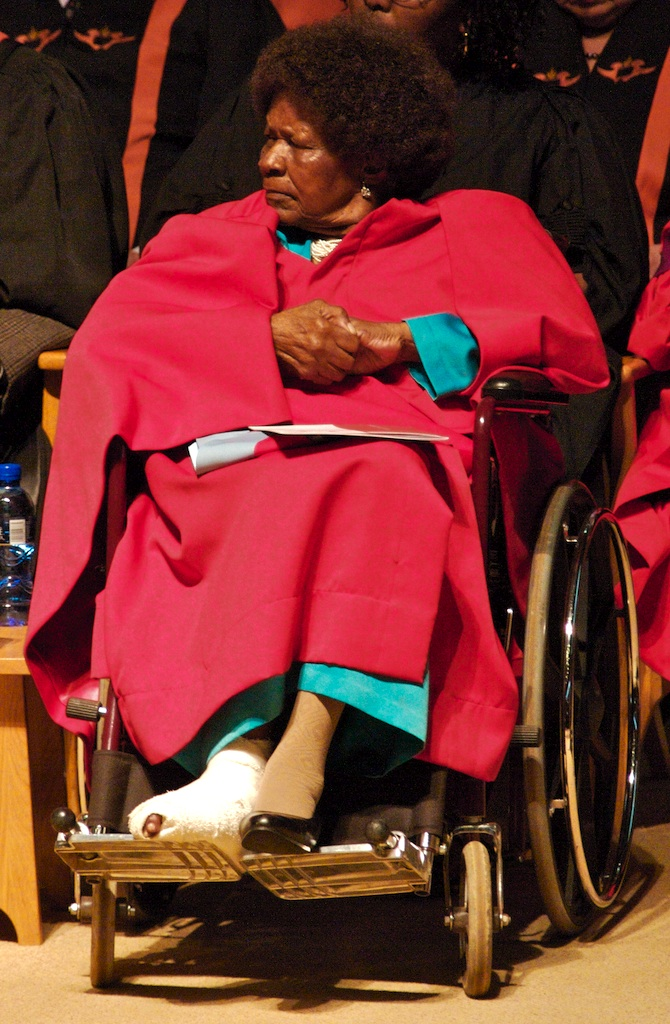
Albertina Sisulu

- Elizabeth 'Nanna' Abrahams, political activist and trade unionist (1925–2008)
- Zackie Achmat, AIDS activist (born 1962)
- Neil Aggett, political activist and trade unionist (1953–1982)
- Neville Alexander, revolutionary and proponent of a multilingual South Africa (1936–2012)
- Abdul Kader Asmal, South African politician (1934–2011)
- Abu Baker Asvat, founding member of Azapo (1943–1989)
- Zainab Asvat, South African anti-apartheid activist (1920–2013)
- Frances Baard, trade unionist, organiser for the African National Congress Women's League and a Patron of the United Democratic Front (1909–1997)
- Esther Barsel, South African political activist, long-standing member of the South African Communist Party and wife to Hymie Barsel (1924–2008)
- Hymie Barsel, South African activist (1920–1987)
- Jeremy Baskin, trade unionist (born 1956)
- Jean Bernadt, anti-apartheid activist (1914–2011)
- Lionel Bernstein, anti-apartheid activist and political prisoner (1920–2002)
- Edward Bhengu, founder member of the PAC (1934–2010)
- Nokukhanya Bhengu, anti-apartheid activist and teacher (1904–1996)
- Sibusiso Bengu, politician (1934–2024)
- Steve Biko, nonviolent political activist (1946–1977)
- Flag Boshielo, South African anti-apartheid activist, trade unionist and communist (1920–1970)
- Dennis Brutus, political activist, educator, journalist and poet (1924–2009)
- Sonia Bunting, journalist, political and anti-apartheid activist (1922–2001)
- Amina Cachalia, South African anti-Apartheid activist, women's rights activist, politician, and second wife of Yusuf Cachalia (1930–2013)
- Ismail Ahmed Cachalia, South African political activist and a leader of Transvaal Indian Congress and the African National Congress (1908–2003)
- Yusuf Cachalia, South African anti-apartheid activist (1915–1995)
- Fort Calata, political activist and one of The Cradock Four (1956–1985)
- James Calata, political activist and ANC secretary (1895–1983)
- Collins Chabane, South African Minister of Public Service and Administration (1960–2015)
- Laloo Chiba, South African politician and revolutionary (1930–2017)
- Yusuf Dadoo, South African Communist and an anti-apartheid activist (1909–1983)
- Nelson Diale, politician and anti-apartheid activist (1936–2015)
- Eddie Daniels, anti-apartheid activist (1928–2017)
- Nosipho Dastile, community and anti-Apartheid activist (1938–2009)
- Sophia De Bruyn, political activist (born 1938)
- Amina Desai, political prisoner (1920–2009)
- Lilian Diedericks, activist (1925–2021)
- Jessie Rose Innes, nurse and suffragist (1860–1943)
- Bettie du Toit, trade unionist, anti-apartheid activist and first wife of Yusuf Cachalia (1910–2002)
- Ebrahim Ebrahim, South African anti-apartheid activist (1937–2021)
- Colin Eglin, South African politician (1925–2013)
- Farid Esack, political activist and opposition to apartheid (born 1959)
- Lucinda Evans, women's right activist (born 1972)
- Tshenuwani Farisani, South African politician, theologian, and Lutheran minister (1947–2025)
- Ruth First, South African anti-apartheid activist, scholar and wife to Joe Slovo (1925–1982)
- Pregs Govender, human rights activist, former ANC MP, anti-apartheid campaigner (born 1960)
- Irene Grootboom, housing rights activist (c. 1969–2008)
- Denis Goldberg, political activist (1933–2020)
- Arthur Goldreich, abstract painter and anti-apartheid (1929–2011)
- John Gomomo, South African Unionist and activist (1945–2008)
- Matthew Goniwe, political activist and one of the Cradock four (1946–1985)
- Zainunnisa Gool, anti-apartheid political and civil rights leader (1897–1963)
- Joe Nzingo Gqabi, political activist (1929–1981)
- Archibald Gumede, anti-apartheid activist, lawyer and politician (1914–1998)
- Elizabeth Komikie Gumede, anti-apartheid activist and member of the Azanian People's Liberation Army (1921– 2016)
- Josiah Tshangana Gumede, political activist (1867–1946)
- Harry Gwala, revolutionary leader in the African National Congress and South African Communist Party (1920–1995)
- Nkululeko Gwala, prominent member of the shackdwellers' social movement Abahlali baseMjondolo (died 2013)
- Alcott Skei Gwentshe, shopkeeper and political activist (died 1966)
- Bertha Gxowa, anti-apartheid, women's rights activist and trade unionist (1934–2010)
- Chris Hani, political activist (1942–1993)
- Harold Hanson, politician and advocate (1904–1973)
- Frederick John Harris, South African schoolteacher and anti-apartheid (1937–1965)
- Abdullah Haron, South African Muslim cleric and anti-apartheid activist (1924–1969)
- Ruth Hayman, anti-apartheid campaigner (1913–1981)
- Alexander Hepple, trade unionist, politician, anti-apartheid activist and author and the last leader of the original South African Labour Party (1904–1983)
- Bob Hepple, political activist, leader in the fields of labour law, equality and human rights (1934–2015)
- Bavelile Gloria Hlongwa, South African chemical engineer and politician (1981–2019)
- Bantu Holomisa, political activist (born 1955)
- Timothy Peter Jenkin, anti-apartheid activist, political prisoner and writer (born 1948)
- Helen Joseph, anti-apartheid activist (1905–1992)
- Mthuli ka Shezi, South African playwright, political activist (1947–1972)
- James Kantor, politician, lawyer and writer (1927–1974)
- Ahmed Kathrada, political activist (1929–2017)
- Philip Kgosana, political activist (1936–2017)
- Winnie Kgware, anti-Apartheid activist (1917–1998)
- Alice Kinloch (born 1863), human rights activist and writer
- Wolfie Kodesh, South African Communist party activist (1918–2002)
- Moses Kotane, anti-apartheid activist (1907–1978)
- Ashley Kriel, South African activist (1966–1987)
- Duma Kumalo, South African human rights activist and one of the Sharpeville Six (died 2006)
- Dumisani Kumalo, South African politician (1947–2019)
- Ellen Kuzwayo, political activist (1914–2006)
- Lennox Lagu, political activist (1938–2011)
- Sheila Lapinsky (born 1944), anti-apartheid and LGBTQ+ activist
- Stephen Bernard Lee, anti-apartheid and political prisoner (born 1951)
- Anton Lembede, political activist (1914–1947)
- Moses Mabhida, anti-apartheid activist (1923–1986)
- Phakamile Mabija, anti-apartheid activist (died 1977)
- Winnie Madikizela-Mandela, political activist and former 2nd wife to Nelson Mandela (1936–2018)
- Sindiso Magaqa, politician (1981/1982–2017)
- Zanele kaMagwaza-Msibi, South African politician (1962–2021)
- Zacharias Richard Mahabane, political activist (1881–1971)
- Mac Maharaj, political activist (born 1935)
- Solomon Mahlangu, Umkhonto we Sizwe operative (1956–1979)
- Thoko Remigia Makhanya, anti-apartheid activist, environmental activist, women's health specialist and poet
- Vusumzi Make, political activist (1931–2006)
- Sefako Makgatho, political activist (1861–1951)
- Caesarina Kona Makhoere, anti-apartheid activist and prison writer (born 1955)
- Mbuyisa Makhubo, anti-apartheid activist (born 1957/1958)
- Thabo Makunyane, politician and former anti-apartheid activist (1953–2020)
- Clarence Makwetu, political activist (1928–2016)
- Adolph Malan, fighter pilot and civil rights activist (1910–1963)
- Zollie Malindi, political activist (1924–2008)
- Nelson Mandela, political activist and first President of South Africa (1918–2013)
- Winnie Madikizela-Mandela, politician and second wife of Nelson Mandela (1936–2018)
- Mosibudi Mangena, South Africa politician (born 1947)
- Magwaza Maphalala, politician and trade unionist (1948–2003)
- Isaac Lesiba Maphotho, political activist (1931–2019)
- J. B. Marks, politician activist (1903–1972)
- Jafta Masemola, political activist (1929–1990)
- Emma Mashinini, trade unionist and political leader (1929–2017)
- Tsietsi Mashinini, South African anti-Apartheid activist and student leader of the Soweto uprising on 16 June 1976 (1957–1990)
- Andrew Masondo, South African mathematician, political prisoner, a former general in the South African National Defence Force (SANDF) (1936–2008)
- Joseph Mathunjwa, trade union leader and the head of the Association of Mineworkers and Construction Union (AMCU) (born 1965)
- Florence Matomela, South African anti-pass law activist (1910–1969)
- Joe Matthews, political activist and son of ZK Matthews (1929–2010)
- Z. K. Matthews, political activist (1901–1968)
- Seth Mazibuko, youngest member of the South African Students' Organisation that planned and led the Soweto uprising
- Epainette Mbeki, political activist, mother of Thabo Mbeki and wife to Govan Mbeki (1916–2014)
- Govan Mbeki, political activist and father of Thabo Mbeki (1910–2001)
- Jama Mbeki, political activist, law student and the last born son of Govan Mbeki (1948–1982)
- Linda Mbeki, political activist (1941–2003)
- Tryphina Mboxela Jokweni, female operative of Umkhonto we Sizwe (MK), and political activist
- Robert McBride, anti-apartheid assassin and later police chief (born 1963)
- A. P. Mda, co-founder of the African National Congress Youth League (ANCYL) and Pan Africanist Congress of Azania (1916–1993)
- Fatima Meer, scientist and political activist (1928–2010)
- Raymond Mhlaba, political activist and the former Premier of the Eastern Cape (1920–2005)
- Sicelo Mhlauli, political activist and one of the Cradock four (1952–1985)
- Jean Middleton, anti-apartheid activist and wife to Harold Strachan (1928–2010)
- Clarence Mini, anti-apartheid activist (1951–2020)
- Vuyisile Mini, unionist and Umkhonto we Sizwe activist (1920–1964)
- Nomhlangano Beauty Mkhize, political activist, shop steward and wife to Saul Mkhize (1946–1977)
- Sparrow Mkhonto, political activist and one of the Cradock four (1951–1985)
- Wilton Mkwayi, political activist (1923–2004)
- Johnson Mlambo, political activist (1940–2021)
- Andrew Mlangeni, political activist (1925–2020)
- Thamsanga Mnyele, anti-apartheid (1948–1985)
- Billy Modise, political activist (1930–2018)
- Joe Modise, political activist (1929–2001)
- Thabo Edwin Mofutsanyana, political activist (1899–1995)
- Ephraim Mogale, politician and former anti-apartheid activist (1959–2003)
- Mapetla Mohapi, political activist (1947–1976)
- Yunus Mohamed, (sometimes Mahomed) South African lawyer and activist (1950–2008)
- Peter Mokaba, political activist (1959–2002)
- Priscilla Mokaba, political activist and mother of Peter Mokaba (died 2013)
- Ruth Mompati, political activist (1925–2015)
- Moosa Moolla, political activist (1934–2023)
- Strini Moodley, founding member of the Black Consciousness Movement in South Africa (1946–2006)
- Rahima Moosa, anti-apartheid activist (1922–1993)
- James Moroka, political activist (1891–1985)
- Zephania Mothopeng, political activist (1913–1990)
- Nthato Motlana, physician and anti-apartheid activist (1925–2008)
- Caroline Motsoaledi, political activist and wife to Elias Motsoaledi (died c.2015)
- Elias Motsoaledi, political activist (1924–1994)
- James Mpanza, political activist (1889–1970)
- Oscar Mpetha, political activist and unionist (1909–1994)
- Eric Mtshali, politician, trade unionist, and anti-apartheid activist (1933–2018)
- Griffiths Mxenge, anti-apartheid activist (1935–1981)
- Victoria Mxenge, anti-apartheid activist (1942–1985)
- George Naicker, anti-apartheid activist (1919–1998)
- Marimuthu Pragalathan Naicker, anti-apartheid activist, journalist and trade unionist (1920–1977)
- Monty Naicker, anti-apartheid activist and medical doctor (1910–1978)
- Ama Naidoo, anti-apartheid activist (1908–1993)
- Naransamy Roy Naidoo, political (1901–1953)
- Billy Nair, political activist (1929–2008)
- Elleck Nchabeleng, politician (born 1958)
- Peter Nchabeleng, trade unionist and anti-apartheid activist (1928–1986)
- Rita Ndzanga, anti-apartheid activist and trade unionist (1933–2022)
- Mary Ngalo, South African anti-apartheid activist and was also active in fighting for women's rights (died 1973)
- Lilian Ngoyi, anti-apartheid activist (1911–1980)
- Looksmart Ngudle, political activist (1922–1963)
- Joe Nhlanhla, African National Congress national executive and the former South African Minister of Justice (Intelligence Affairs) (1936–2008)
- John Nkadimeng, politician and anti-apartheid activist (1927–2020)
- Vernon Nkadimeng, political activist (1958–1985)
- Nkwenkwe Nkomo, SASO nine member
- William Frederick Nkomo, medical doctor, community leader, political activist and teacher (1915–1972)
- Duma Nokwe, political activist (1927–1978)
- Jabulile Nyawose, trade unionist and anti-apartheid activist (1948–1982)
- Alfred Nzo, political activist (1925–2000)
- Albert Nzula, political activist (1905–1934)
- Abdullah Mohamed Omar, anti-Apartheid activist and lawyer (1934–2004)
- Roy Padayachie, politician and Minister of Public Service and Administration of the Republic of South Africa (1950–2012)
- Aziz Pahad, political activist (1940–2023)
- Essop Pahad, political activist (1939–2023)
- Sabelo Phama, revolutionary (1949–1994)
- Motsoko Pheko, politician, lawyer, author, historian, theologian and academic (1930–2024)
- Joyce Piliso-Seroke, South-African educator, activist, feminist and community organizer (born 1933)
- Sol Plaatje, political activist (1876–1932)
- John Nyathi Pokela, political activist (1922/1923–1985)
- Maggie Resha, political activist and wife of Robert Resha (1923–2003)
- Robert Resha, political activist (1920–1978)
- Fabian Ribeiro, doctor and anti-apartheid activist (1933–1986)
- Florence Ribeiro, anti-apartheid activist and wife of Fabian Ribeiro (1933–1986)
- Walter Rubusana, first deputy president of the ANC (1856–1936)
- Albie Sachs, political activist (born 1935)
- Harry Schwarz, lawyer, statesman and long-time political opposition leader against apartheid in South Africa (1924–2010)
- Jackie Sedibe, South African National Defence Force (SANDF) Major General and politician activist and wife to Joe Modise (born 1945)
- Molefi Sefularo, Deputy Minister of Health (1957–2010)
- James Seipei, teenage United Democratic Front (UDF) activist (1974–1989)
- Nimrod Sejake, labour leader in South Africa, leading member of the Congress of South African Trade Unions and secretary of the Iron Steel Workers (1920–2004)
- Dulcie September, anti-apartheid political activist (1935–1988)
- Kate Serokolo, anti-apartheid activist
- Reggie September, activist (1923–2013)
- Nomvuzo Shabalala, politician (1960–2020)
- Gertrude Shope, South African trade unionist, politician and wife of Mark Shpoe (1925–2025)
- Mark Shope, South African trade unionist and anti-apartheid activist (1919–1998)
- Gert Sibande, political activist (1907–1987)
- Archie Sibeko, political activist and trade unionist (1928–2018)
- David Sibeko, South Africa politician and journalist (1938–1979)
- Letitia Sibeko, political activist and wife to Archie Sibeko (1930–??)
- Joyce Nomafa Sikakane, South African journalist and activist (born 1943)
- Richard Sikakane, South African politician and stalwart of the African National Congress (ANC) (1936–2021)
- Annie Silinga, South African anti-pass laws and anti-apartheid political activist (1910–1984)
- Jack Simons, political activist (1907–1995)
- Rachel Simons, communist and trade unionist and wife to Jack Simons (1914–2004)
- Albertina Sisulu, political activist and wife of Walter Sisulu (1918–2011)
- Walter Sisulu, political activist (1912–2003)
- David Sipunzi, South African trade unionis (1960–2020)
- Zola Skweyiya, political activist (1942–2018)
- Joe Slovo, South African politician, and an opponent of the apartheid system (1926–1995)
- Robert Sobukwe, political activist and founder of PAC (1924–1978)
- Veronica Sobukwe, political activist and wife to Robert Sobukwe (1927–2018)
- Makhenkesi Stofile, political activist (1944–2016)
- Harold Strachan, anti-apartheid activist (1925–2020)
- Katie H. R. Stuart, evangelist and reformer
- Helen Suzman, South African anti-apartheid activist and politician (1917–2009)
- Isaac Bangani Tabata, political activist (1909–1990)
- Dora Tamana, South African anti-apartheid activist (1901–1983)
- Adelaide Tambo, political activist and wife to Oliver Tambo (1929–2007)
- Oliver Tambo, political activist (1917–1993)
- Selope Thema, South African political activist and leader (1886–1955)
- Mary Thipe, anti-apartheid and human rights activist (1917–2002)
- Mohammed Tikly, South African educator and struggle veteran (1939–2020)
- Ahmed Timol, anti-apartheid activist, political leader and activist in the underground South African Communist Party (SACP) (1941–1971)
- Abram Onkgopotse Tiro, student political activist (1945–1974)
- Cecilia Tshabalala, women's rights activist and clubwoman
- Richard Turner, South African academic and anti-apartheid activist (1941–1978)
- Steve Tshwete, political activist (1938–2002)
- Ben Turok, anti-apartheid activist and Economics Professor (1927–2019)
- Moses Twebe, politician (1916–2013)
- Zwelinzima Vavi, former general secretary of COSATU, and Trade union leader SAFTU (born 1962)
- Randolph Vigne, anti-apartheid activist (1928–2016)
- David Webster, South African academic and anti-apartheid activist (1944–1989)
- Sheila Weinberg, anti-apartheid activist (1945–2004)
- Myrtle Witbooi (1947–2023), South African labour activist
- AnnMarie Wolpe, sociologist, feminist, anti-apartheid activist and wife to Harold Wolpe (1930–2018)
- Harold Wolpe, lawyer, sociologist, political economist and anti-apartheid activist (1926–1996)
- Khoisan X, political activist (1955–2010)
- Paul Xiniwe, entrepreneur, educator, and political activist (1857–1902)
- Alfred Xuma, political activist and ANC president (1893–1962)
- Tony Yengeni, anti-apartheid activist (born 1954)
- Massabalala Yengwa, anti-apartheid activist, lawyer and Natal Provincial Secretary of the African National Congress Youth League (ANCYL)
- Andrew Zondo, South African Umkhonto we Sizwe (MK) operative (1966/67–1986)

=== Apartheid operatives ===
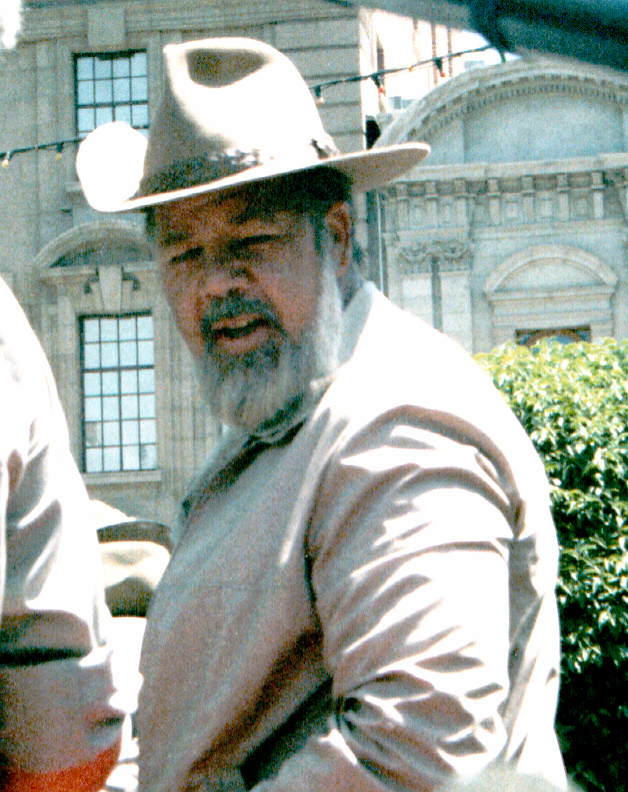
Eugène Terre'Blanche

- Wouter Basson, apartheid scientist (born 1950)
- Dirk Coetzee, apartheid covert operative (1945–2013)
- Eugene de Kock, apartheid assassin (born 1949)
- Clive Derby-Lewis, assassin and former parliamentarian (1936–2016)
- Jimmy Kruger, apartheid Minister of Justice and the Police (1917–1987)
- Lothar Neethling, apartheid forensic scientist (1935–2005)
- Barend Strydom, convicted murderer and white supremacist activist (born 1965)
- Eugène Terre'Blanche, white supremacist activist (1941–2010)
- Adriaan Vlok, apartheid Minister of Law and Order (born 1937)
- Craig Williamson, apartheid spy (born 1949)

=== Colonial and Union Governors ===
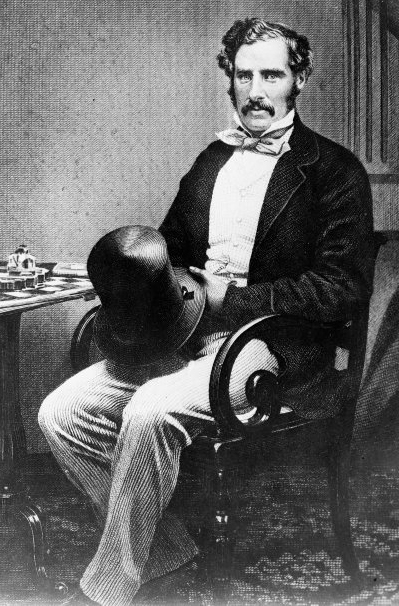
Sir George Grey

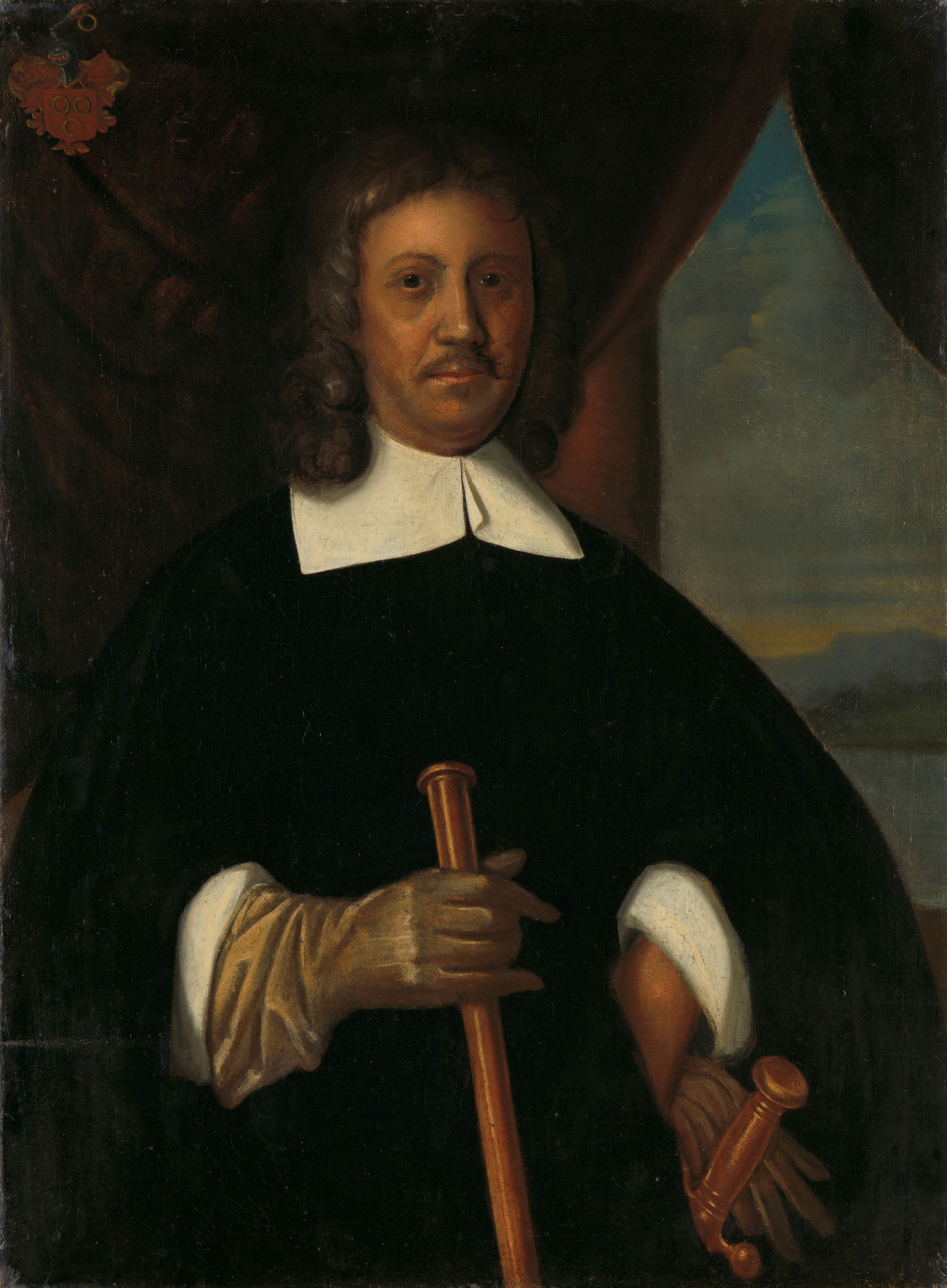
Jan van Riebeeck

- George Grey, Cape governor (1812–1898)
- Jan Willem Janssens, Cape Governor (1762–1838)
- Benjamin d'Urban, Cape Governor (1834–1837)
- Benjamin Pine, Natal governor (1809–1891)
- Harry Smith, Cape governor 1847–1852 (1787–1860)
- Andries Stockenström, governor of British Kaffraria (1792–1864)
- Simon van der Stel, first Cape governor (1639–1712)
- Willem Adriaan van der Stel, second Cape governor (1664–1723)
- Jan van Riebeeck, founder of Cape settlement (1619–1677)
- Nicolaas Jacobus de Wet, Chief Justice of South Africa and acting Governor-General (1873–1960)

=== Leaders and politicians ===
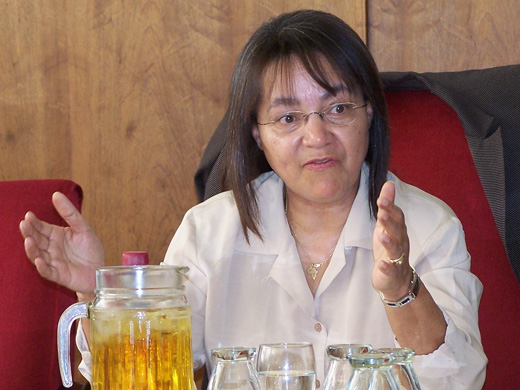
Patricia de Lille

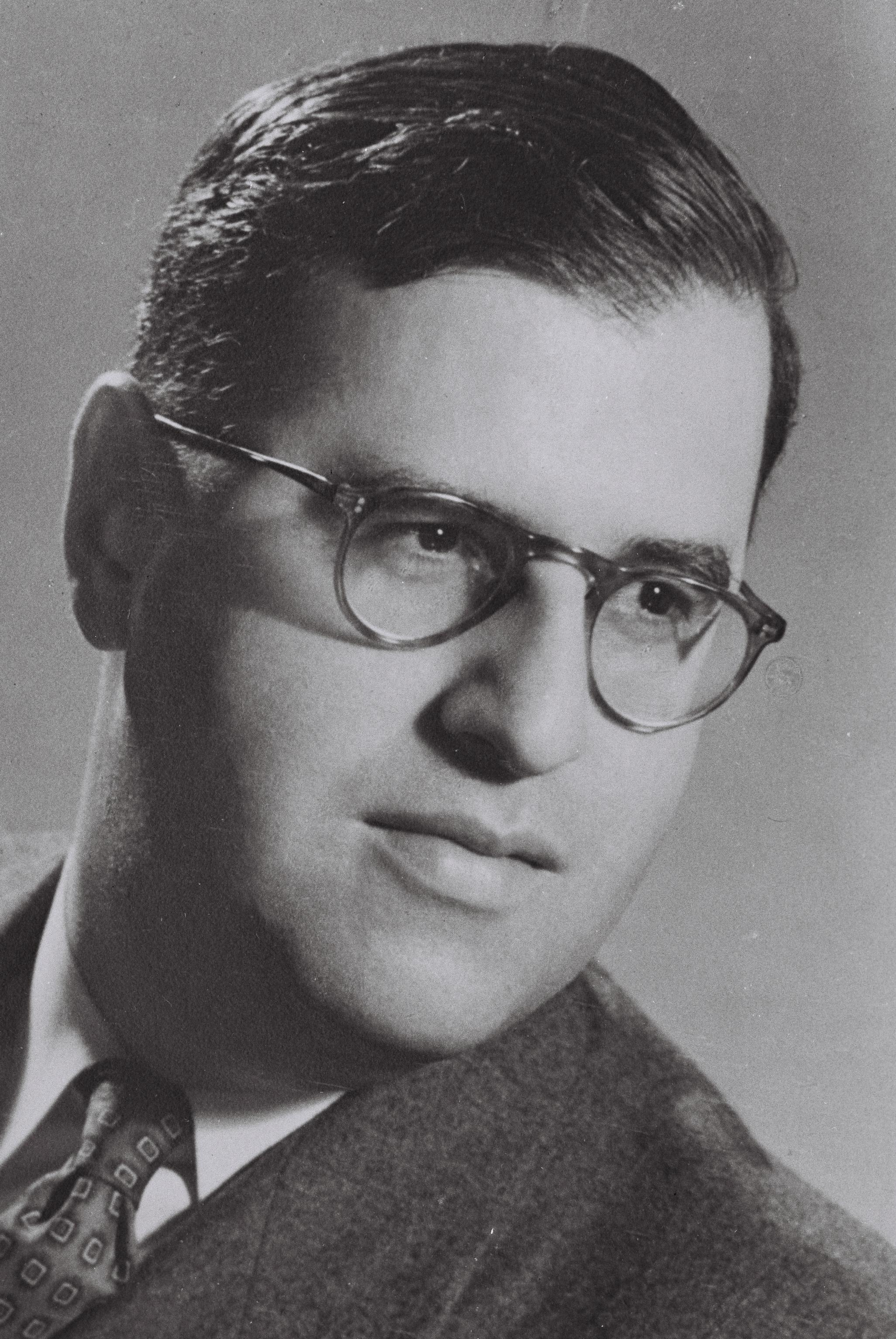
Abba Eban

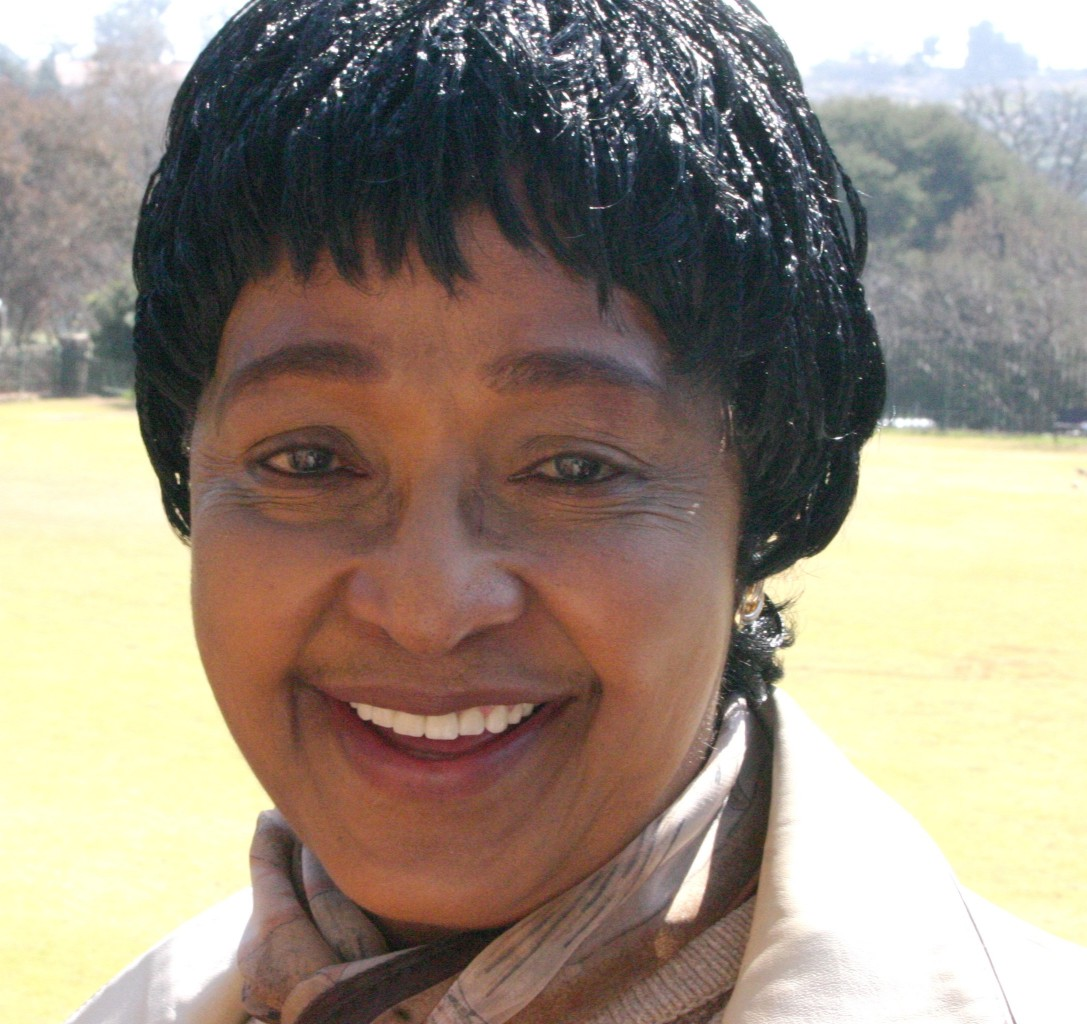
Winnie Mandela

- Ken Andrew, politician (born 1943)
- Kader Asmal, activist, politician and professor of human rights (1934–2011)
- Sibusiso Bengu, politician (1934–2024)
- Steve Biko, nonviolent political activist (1946–1977)
- Thozamile Botha, politician (born 1948)
- Cheryl Carolus, politician (born 1958)
- Yusuf Dadoo, doctor and politician (1909–1983)
- Patricia de Lille, politician (born 1951)
- Nkosazana Dlamini-Zuma, politician (born 1949)
- John Langalibalele Dube, founder and first president of ANC (1871–1946)
- Abba Eban, Israeli diplomat and politician, and President of the Weizmann Institute of Science (1915–2002)
- De Villiers Graaff, United Party opposition leader (1913–1999)
- Jan Hendrik Hofmeyr, journalist and politician (1845–1909)
- Jan Hendrik Hofmeyr, academic and politician (1894–1948)
- Danny Jordaan, politician and soccer administrator (born 1951)
- Tony Leon, DA opposition leader (born 1956)
- Albert Luthuli, President of the African National Congress, 1952–67 (1898–1967)
- Winnie Madikizela-Mandela, politician and second wife of Nelson Mandela (1936–2018)
- Trevor Manuel, minister of finance (born 1956)
- Lindiwe Mazibuko, former Parliamentary Leader for the opposition Democratic Alliance (born 1980)
- Govan Mbeki, political activist and father of Thabo Mbeki (1910–2001)
- Roelf Meyer, politician and businessman (born 1947)
- Raymond Mhlaba, political activist and the former Premier of the Eastern Cape (1920–2005)
- Vuyisile Mini, unionist and Umkhonto we Sizwe activist (1920–1964)
- Johnson Mlambo, political activist (1940–2021)
- Phumzile Mlambo-Ngcuka, deputy president (born 1955)
- Pieter Mulder, leader of the Freedom Front Plus and former deputy minister of agriculture (born 1951)
- Gagathura (Monty) Mohambry Naicker, medical doctor and politician (1910–1978)
- Bulelani Ngcuka, politician (born 1954)
- Dullah Omar, politician (1934–2004)
- Andries Pretorius, Boer leader and commandant-general (1799–1853)
- Deneys Reitz, boer commando, deputy Prime Minister and High Commissioner to London (1882–1944)
- Pixley ka Isaka Seme, ANC founder member (1881–1951)
- Mbhazima Shilowa, trade unionist and premier (born 1958)
- Walter Sisulu, political activist (1912–2003)
- Ruth First-Slovo, political activist and wife to Joe Slovo (1924–1982)
- Joe Slovo, politician (1926–1995)
- Theophilus Lyndall Schreiner, educator, legislator, and reformer
- Harry Schwarz, lawyer, politician, ambassador to United States and anti-apartheid leader (1924–2010)
- Robert Sobukwe, political activist and founder of PAC (1924–1978)
- Helen Suzman, politician (1917–2009)
- Oliver Tambo, political activist (1917–1993)
- Catherine Taylor, politician (1914–1992)
- Frederik van Zyl Slabbert, PFP opposition leader (1940–2010)
- Helen Zille, former DA opposition leader, former premier of the Western Cape (born 1951)
- Jacob Zuma, former president (born 1942)

=== Prime Ministers and presidents ===
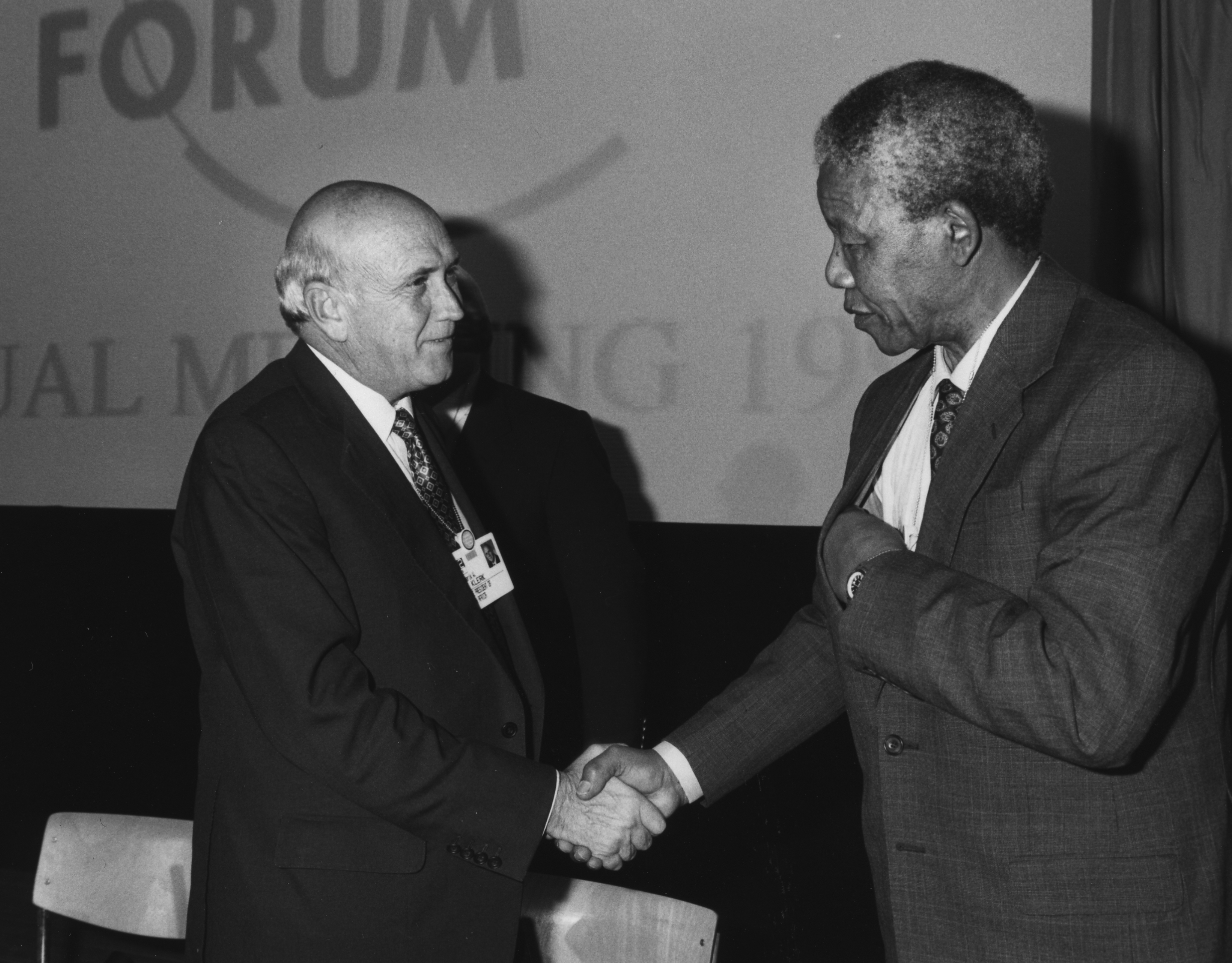
Frederik de Klerk and Nelson Mandela

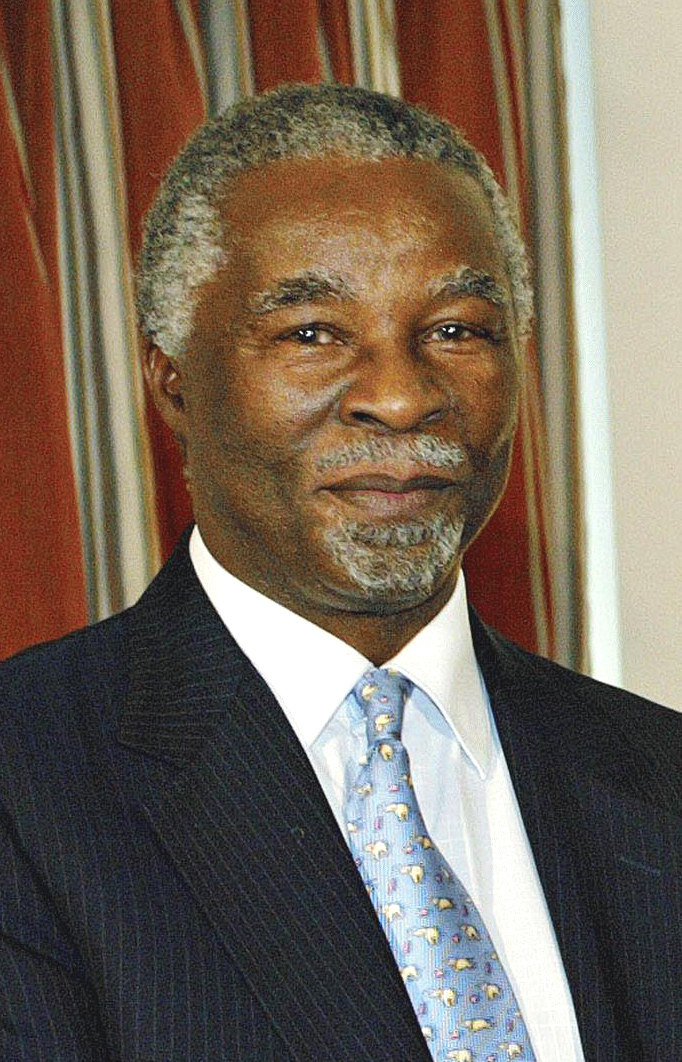
Thabo Mbeki

- Jacobus Boshoff, 2nd President of the Orange Free State (1808–1881)
- Louis Botha, Boer commander-in-chief and 1st Prime Minister of South Africa (1862–1919)
- Pieter Willem Botha, 9th and last Prime Minister and 8th State President of South Africa (1916–2006)
- Johannes Henricus Brand, 4th President of the Orange Free State (1823–1888)
- Thomas François Burgers, 4th President of South African Republic (1871–1877)
- Schalk Willem Burger, 6th and last President of South African Republic (1852–1918)
- Frederik Willem de Klerk, 9th and last State President of South Africa (1990–1994) and joint Nobel Peace Prize winner (1936–2021)
- Nicolaas Johannes Diederichs, 4th State President of South Africa (1903–1978)
- Jacobus Johannes Fouché, 3rd State President of South Africa (1898–1980)
- James Barry Munnik Hertzog, Boer general and 3rd Prime Minister of South Africa (1866–1942)
- Josias Hoffman, 1st President of the Orange Free State (1807–1879)
- Petrus Jacobus Joubert, Boer general and member of the Troika in the South African Republic (1834–1900)
- Paul Kruger, member of the Troika, 5th President of South African Republic (1825–1904)
- Daniel François Malan, 5th Prime Minister of South Africa and is responsible for laying the groundwork for Apartheid (1874–1959)
- Nelson Mandela, 1st democratically elected President of South Africa and joint Nobel Peace Prize winner (1918–2013)
- Thabo Mbeki, 2nd post-apartheid President of South Africa (born 1942)
- John X. Merriman, last prime minister of the Cape Colony (1841–1926)
- Kgalema Motlanthe, 3rd post-apartheid President of South Africa (born 1949)
- Tom Naudé, 2nd State President of South Africa (1889–1969)
- Marthinus Wessel Pretorius, 3rd President of the Orange Free State, 1st and 3rd President of the ZAR (1819–1901)
- Marthinus Prinsloo, 1st President of the Republic of Graaff-Reinet (1751–1825)
- Cyril Ramaphosa, 5th post-apartheid President of South Africa (born 1952)
- Francis William Reitz, 5th President of the Orange Free State (1844–1934)
- Jan Smuts, Boer general, British field marshal, 2nd and 4th Prime Minister of South Africa (1870–1950)
- Johannes Strijdom, 6th Prime Minister of South Africa (1893–1958)
- Hermanus Steyn, 1st and last President of the Republic of Swellendam (1743–1804)
- Martinus Theunis Steyn, 6th and last President of the Orange Free State (1857–1916)
- Charles Robberts Swart, last Governor-General of the Union of South Africa and 1st State President of the RSA (1894–1982)
- Hendrik Frensch Verwoerd, 7th Prime Minister of South Africa and primary architect of Apartheid (1901–1966)
- Marais Viljoen, 5th and 7th State President of South Africa (1915–2007)
- Balthazar Johannes Vorster, 8th Prime Minister and 6th State President of South Africa (1915–1983)
- Jacob Zuma, 4th post-apartheid President of South Africa (born 1942)

=== Provincial Premiers ===
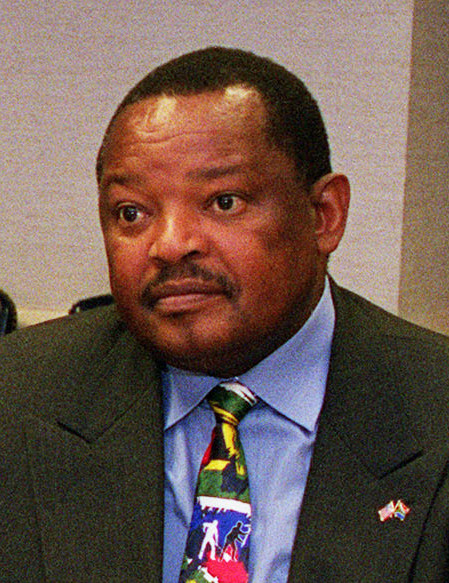
Mosiuoa Lekota

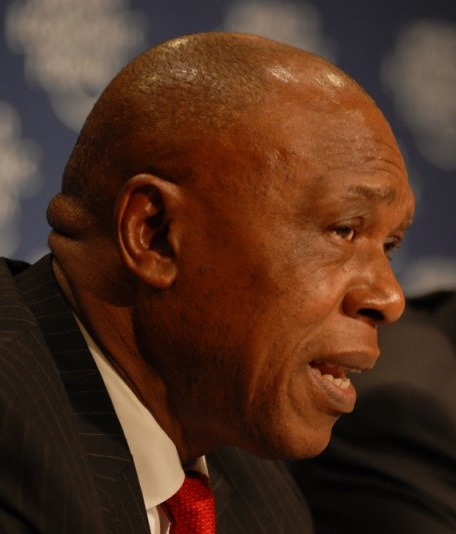
Tokyo Sexwale

- Nosimo Balindlela, 3rd Premier of the Eastern Cape (born 1949)
- Lynne Brown, (interim) 6th Premier of the Western Cape (born 1961)
- Ivy Matsepe-Casaburri, 2nd Premier of the Free State (1937–2009)
- Grizelda Cjiekella, (acting) Premier of the Northern Cape (1970–2012)
- Manne Dipico, 1st Premier of the Northern Cape (born 1959)
- Winkie Direko, 3rd Premier of the Free State (1929–2012)
- Hazel Jenkins, 3rd Premier of the Northern Cape (born 1960)
- Noxolo Kiviet, 5th Premier of the Eastern Cape (born 1963)
- Hernus Kriel, 1st Premier of the Western Cape (1941–2015)
- Mosiuoa Lekota, 1st Premier of the Free State (1948–2026)
- Sylvia Lucas, 4th Premier of the Northern Cape (born 1964)
- David Mabuza, 4th Premier of Mpumalanga (1960–2025)
- Ace Magashule, 5th Premier of the Free State (born 1959)
- Supra Mahumapelo, 5th Premier of North West (born 1968)
- David Makhura, 6th Premier of Gauteng (born 1968)
- Thabang Makwetla, 3rd Premier of Mpumalanga (born 1957)
- Peter Marais, 3rd Premier of the Western Cape (born 1948)
- Beatrice Marshoff, 4th Premier of the Free State (born 1957)
- Paul Mashatile, 4th Premier of Gauteng (born 1961)
- Stanley Mathabatha, 4th Premier of Limpopo (born 1957)
- Cassel Mathale, 3rd Premier of Limpopo (born 1961)
- Senzo Mchunu, 6th Premier of KwaZulu-Natal (born 1958)
- Willies Mchunu, 7th Premier of KwaZulu-Natal (born 1948)
- Frank Mdlalose, 1st Premier of KwaZulu-Natal (1931–2021)
- Raymond Mhlaba, 1st Premier of the Eastern Cape (1920–2005)
- Zweli Mkhize, 5th Premier of KwaZulu-Natal (born 1956)
- Thandi Modise, 4th Premier of North West (born 1959)
- Maureen Modiselle, 3rd Premier of North West (born 1941)
- Job Mokgoro, 6th Premier of North West (born 1948)
- Nomvula Mokonyane, 5th Premier of Gauteng (born 1963)
- Popo Molefe, 1st Premier of North West (born 1952)
- Edna Molewa, 2nd Premier of North West (1957–2018)
- Sello Moloto, 2nd Premier of Limpopo (born 1964)
- Gerald Morkel, 2nd Premier of the Western Cape (1941–2018)
- Mathole Motshekga, 2nd Premier of Gauteng (born 1949)
- Lionel Mtshali, 3rd Premier of KwaZulu-Natal (1935–2015)
- Refilwe Mtsweni-Tsipane, 5th Premier of Mpumalanga (born 1972/73)
- S'bu Ndebele, 4th Premier of KwaZulu-Natal (born 1948)
- Ben Ngubane, 2nd Premier of KwaZulu-Natal (1941–2021)
- Sisi Ntombela, 6th Premier of the Free State (born 1956/1957)
- Dipuo Peters, 2nd Premier of the Northern Cape (born 1960)
- Mathews Phosa, 1st Premier of Mpumalanga (born 1952)
- Ngoako Ramathlodi, 1st Premier of Limpopo (born 1955)
- Leonard Ramatlakane, (acting) Premier of the Western Cape (born 1953)
- Ebrahim Rasool, 5th Premier of the Western Cape (born 1962)
- Zamani Saul, 5th Premier of the Northern Cape (born 1972)
- Tokyo Sexwale, 1st Premier of Gauteng (born 1953)
- Mbhazima Shilowa, 3rd Premier of Gauteng (born 1958)
- Mbulelo Sogoni, 4th Premier of the Eastern Cape (born 1966)
- Makhenkesi Stofile, 2nd Premier of the Eastern Cape (1944–2016)
- Marthinus van Schalkwyk, 4th Premier of the Western Cape (born 1959)
- Alan Winde, 8th Premier of the Western Cape (born 1965)
- Sihle Zikalala, 8th Premier of KwaZulu-Natal (born 1973)
- Helen Zille, 7th Premier of the Western Cape (born 1951)

=== Homelands Leaders ===
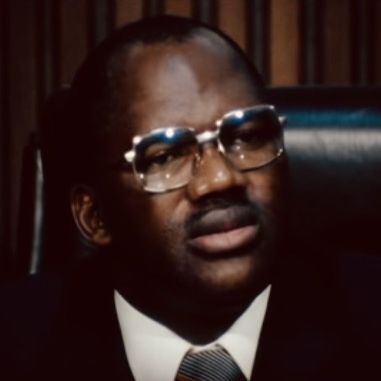
Lennox Sebe

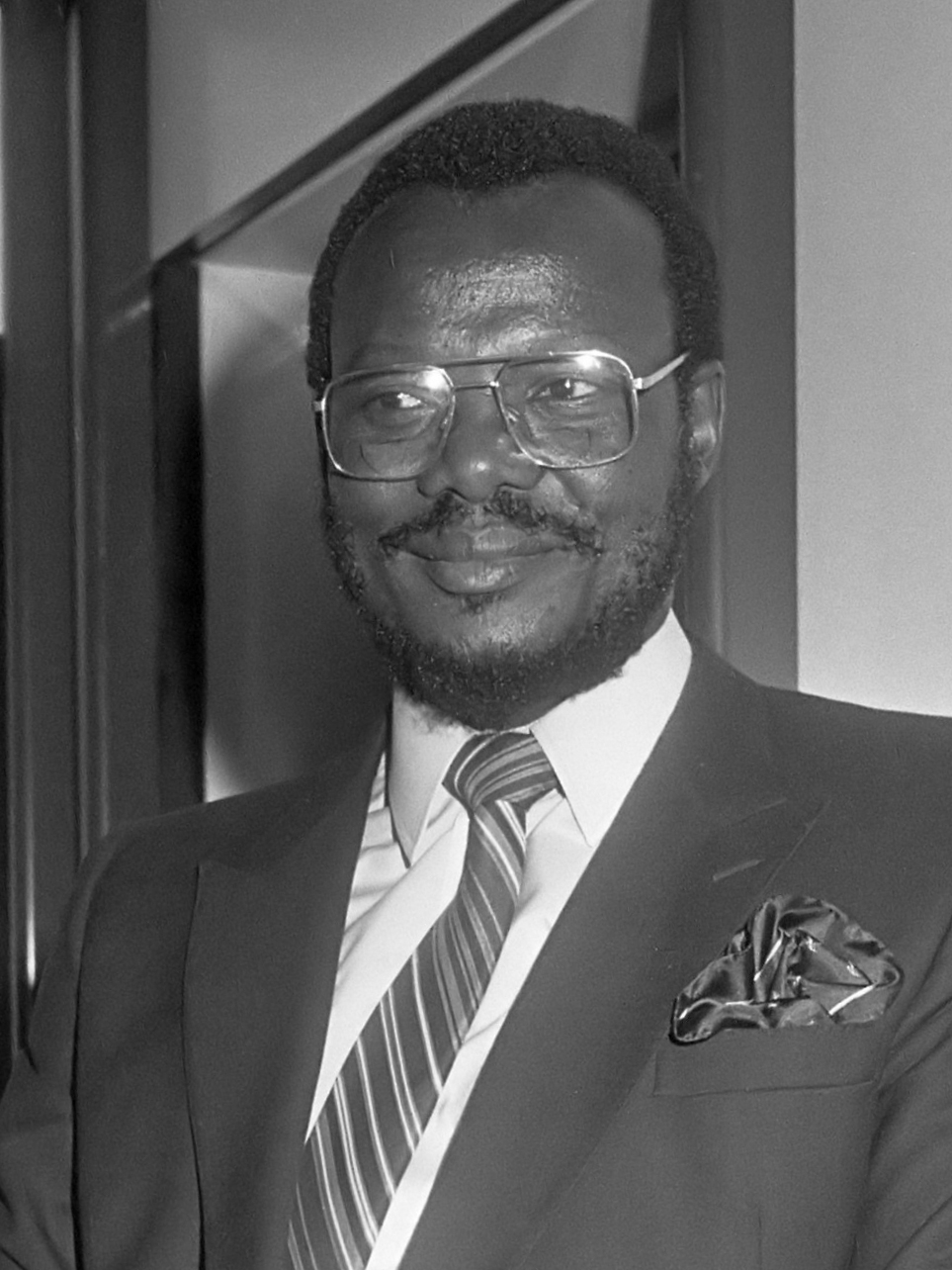
Mangosuthu Buthelezi

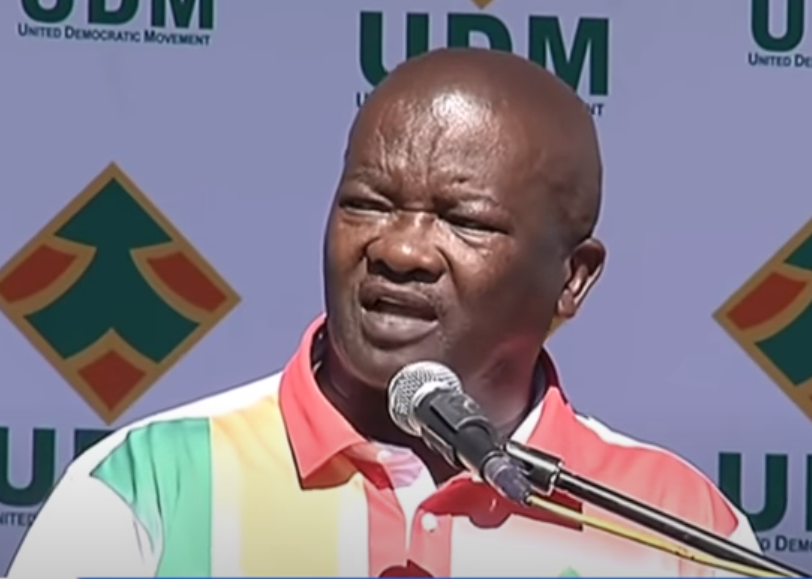
Bantubonke Holomisa

- Prince Mangosuthu Buthelezi, Chief Executive Councillor and Chief Minister of KwaZulu (1928–2023)
- Prince Johannes Mkolishi Dlamini, chief executive officer of KaNgwane (1928–1988)
- Bongani Blessing Finca, Administrator (Transitional Executive Council) of Ciskei (born 1953)
- Oupa Gqozo, President of Ciskei (born 1952)
- Gen. Bantu Holomisa, Prime Minister of Transkei (born 1955)
- Chief Thandathu Jongilizwe Mabandla, chief executive officer; Chief Executive Councillor and Chief Minister of Ciskei (1926–2021)
- Dr. Enos John Mabuza, Chief Minister of KaNgwane (1939–1997)
- Prince James Mahlangu, Chief Minister of KwaNdebele (1953–2005)
- Rocky Malebane-Metsing, President of Bophuthatswana (1949–2016)
- Kgosi Lucas Mangope, chief executive officer; Chief Executive Councillor; Chief Minister and President of Bophuthatswana (1923–2018)
- Chief George Matanzima, Prime Minister of Transkei (1918–2000)
- King Kaiser Matanzima, Chief Minister; Prime Minister and President of Transkei (1915–2003)
- Edward Mhinga, acting Chief Minister of Gazankulu (1927–2017)
- Job Mokgoro, Administrator (Transitional Executive Council) of Bophuthatswana (born 1948)
- Kenneth Mopeli, Chief Executive Councillor and Chief Minister of Qwaqwa (1930–2014)
- Chief Patrick Mphephu, chief executive officer; Chief Executive Councillor; Chief Minister and the President of Venda (1924–1988)
- King Tutor Vulindlela Ndamase, President of Transkei (1921–1997)
- Hudson William Edison Ntsanwisi, Chief of Minister of Gazankulu (1920–1993)
- Samuel Dickenson Nxumalo, Chief Minister of Gazankulu (1926–2017)
- Dr. Cedric Phatudi, Chief Minister of Lebowa (1912–1987)
- Nelson Ramodike, Chief Minister of Lebowa (died 2012)
- Gabriel Ramushwana, Head of State of Venda (1941–2015)
- Frank Ravele, Head of State of Venda (1926–1999)
- Lt. Gen. Charles Sebe, acting Chief Minister of Ciskei (died c.1991)
- Chief Lennox Sebe, Chief Minister and President of Ciskei (1926–1994)
- King Botha Sigcau, President of Transkei and father of Stella Sigcau (1913–1978)
- Stella Sigcau, Prime of Transkei (1937–2006)
- Tjaart van der Walt, Administrator Transitional Executive Council of Bophuthatswana (1934–2019)
- Mangisi Zitha, the last Chief Minister of KaNgwane

=== Administrators of former provinces ===
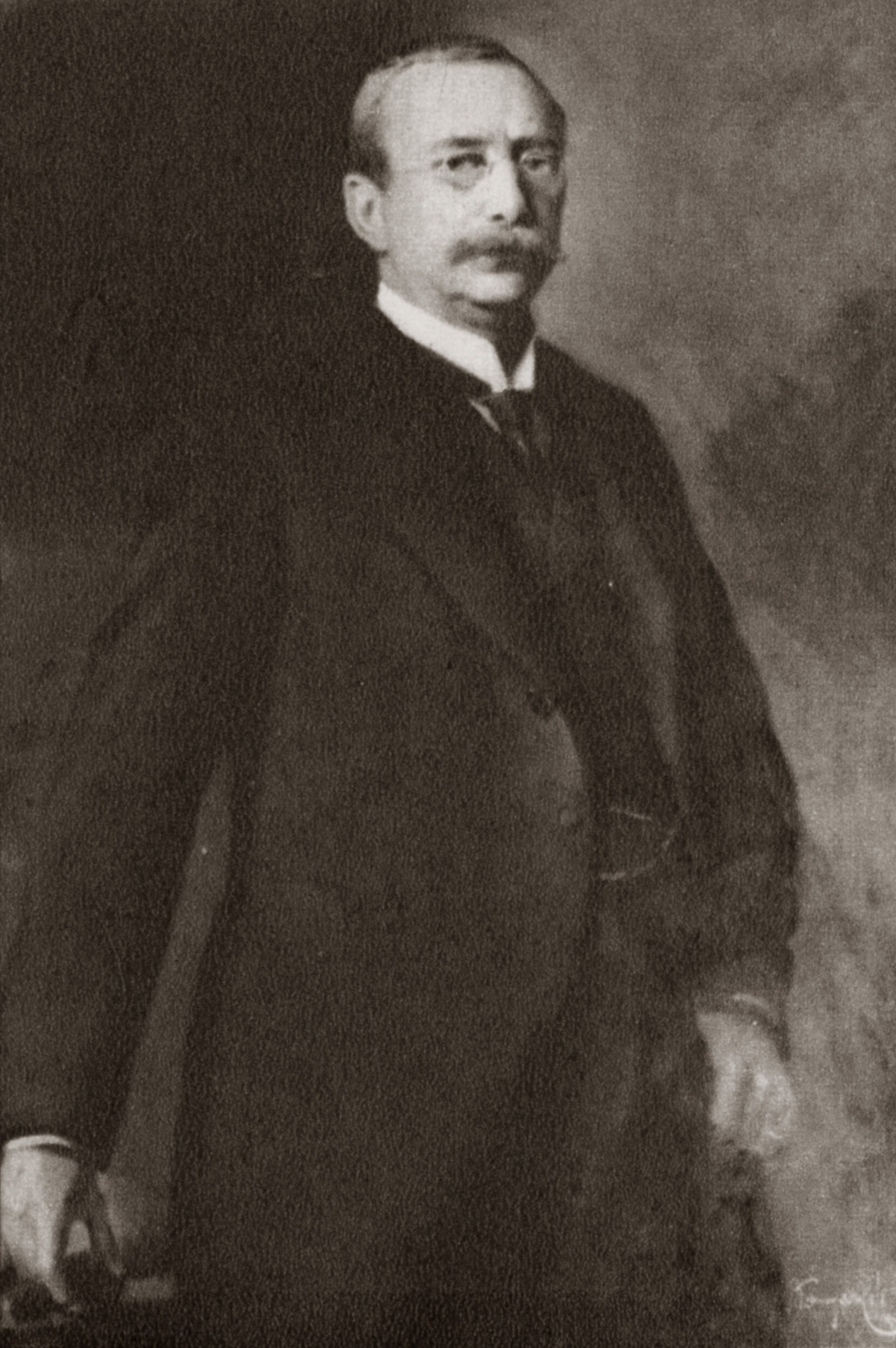
Nicolaas Frederic de Waal

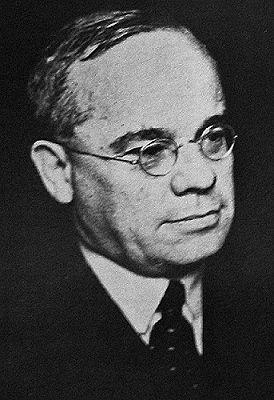
Jan Hendrik Hofmeyr

- Cornelius Botha, 12th and last Administrator of the Natal Province (1932–2014)
- Stoffel Botha, 10th Administrator of the Natal Province (1929–1998)
- Radclyffe Cadman, 11th Administrator of the Natal Province (1924–2011)
- Dr Willem Adriaan Cruywagen, 10th Administrator of the Transvaal Province (1921–2013)
- Nicolaas Frederic de Waal, 1st Administrator of the Cape Province (1853–1932)
- Jim Fouché, 8th Administrator of the Orange Free State Province (1898–1980)
- Theo Gerdener, 8th Administrator of the Natal Province (1916–2013)
- Jan Hendrik Hofmeyr, 3rd Administrator of the Transvaal Province (1894–1948)
- Gene Louw, 13th Administrator of the Cape Province (1931–2015)
- Nico Malan, 10th Administrator of the Cape Province
- William Nico, 7th Administrator of the Transvaal Province (1887–1967)
- Frans Hendrik Odendaal, 8th Administrator of the Transvaal Province (1898–1966)
- Denis Gem Shepstone, 6th Administrator of the Natal Province (1888–1966)
- Alfred Ernest Trollip, 7th Administrator of the Natal Province (1895–1972)
- Johannes Van Rensburg, 6th Administrator of the Orange Free State Province (1898–1966)
- Gideon Brand van Zyl, 5th Administrator of the Cape Province (1873–1956)
- Sir Cornelius Hermanus Wessels, 2nd Administrator of the Orange Free State Province (1851–1924)

== Royalty ==
=== Kings, queens, princes and princesses ===
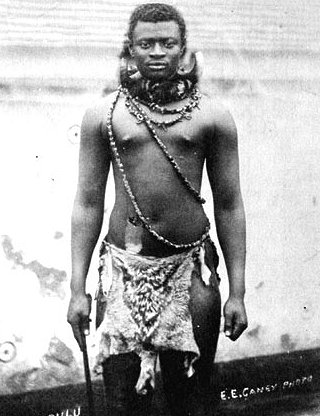
Dinuzulu kaCetshwayo

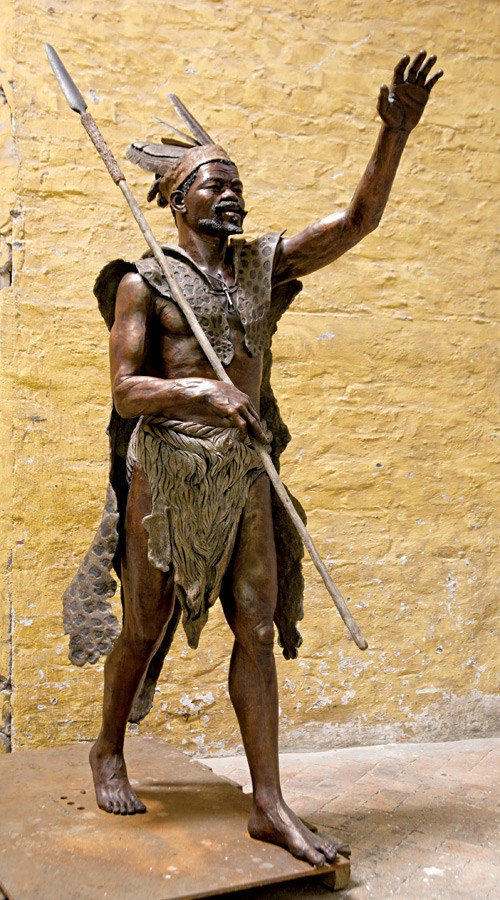
Faku kaNgqungqushe

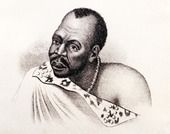
Hintsa ka Khawuta

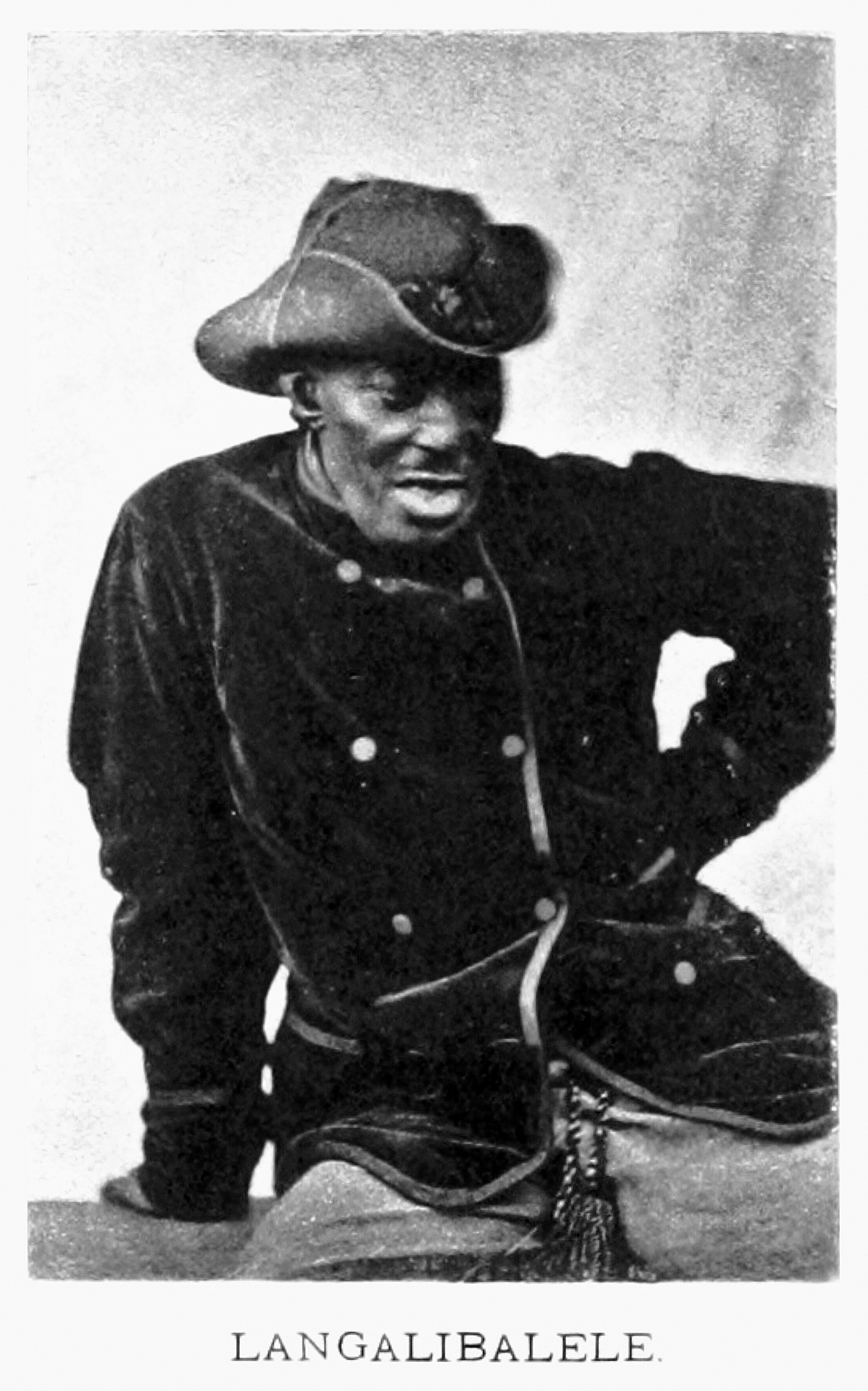
Langalibalele

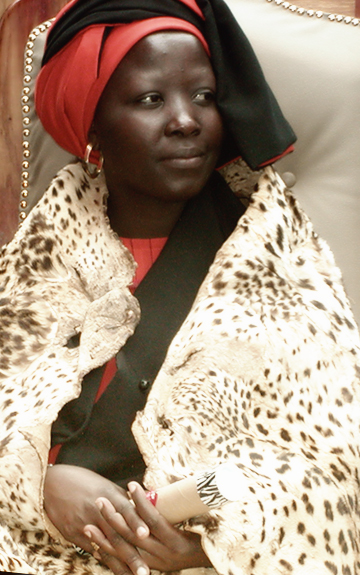
Makobo Modjadji

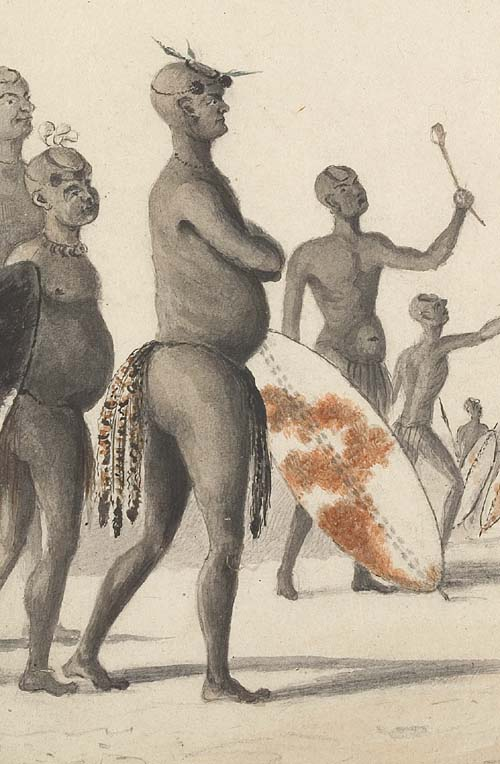
Mzilikazi

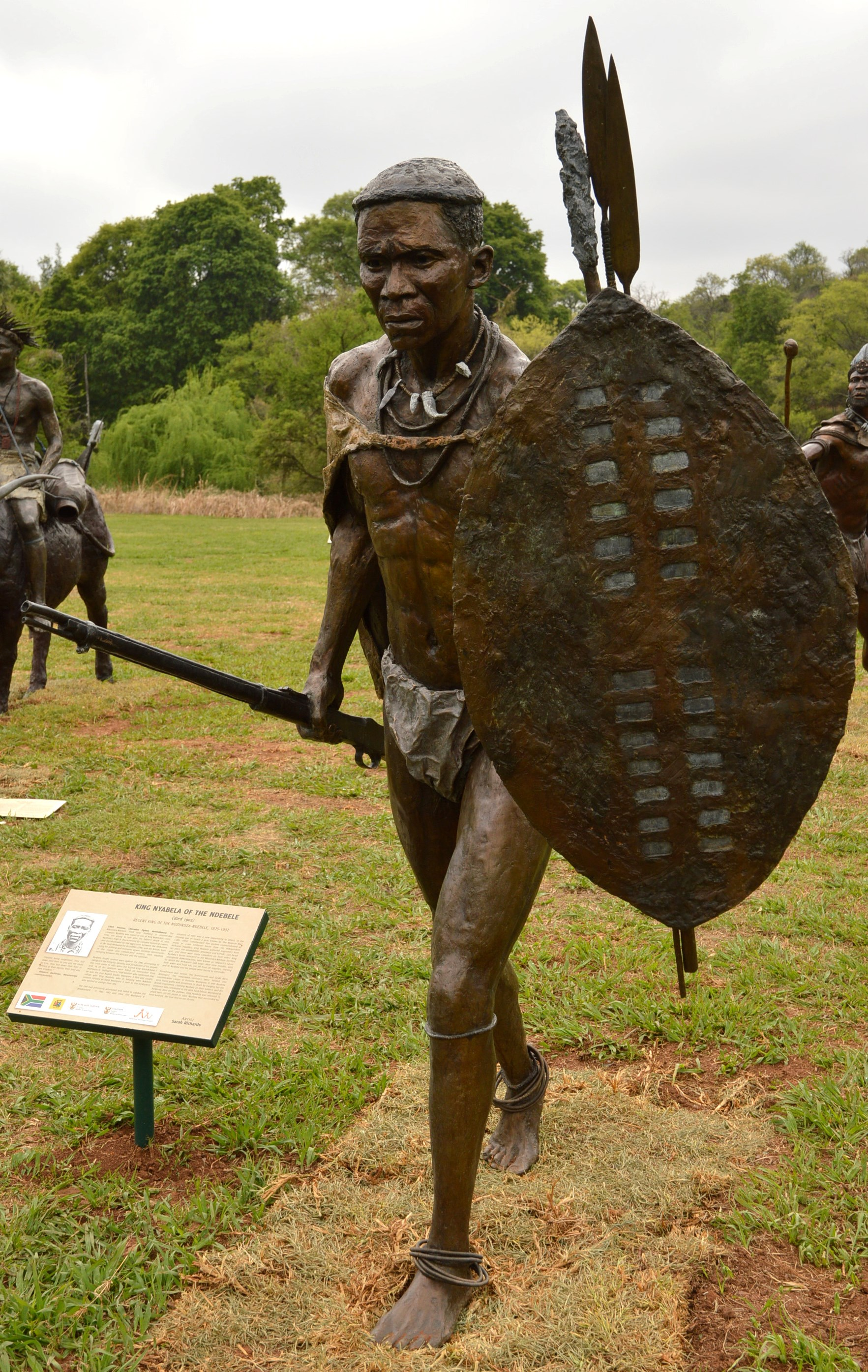
Nyabêla

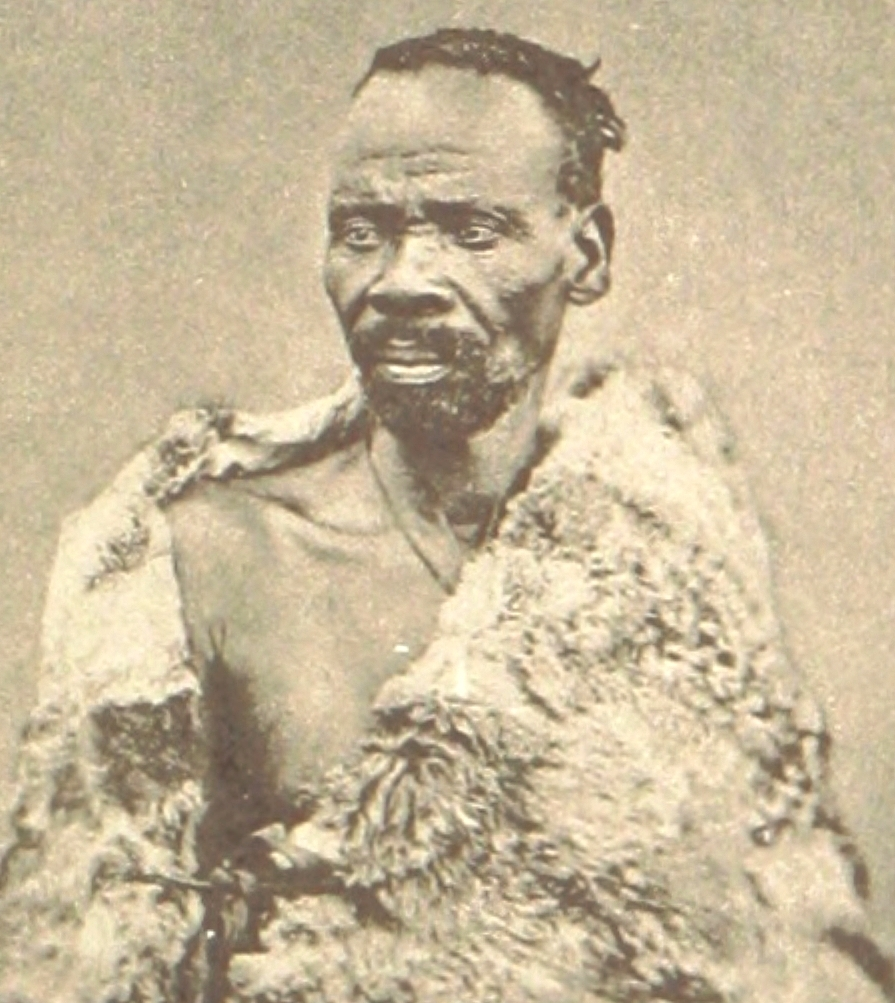
Sekhukhune

- Cetshwayo kaMpande, 4th Zulu king (1826–1884)
- Cyprian Bhekuzulu kaSolomon, 7th Zulu king (1924–1945)
- Goodwill Zwelethini, 8th king of the Zulu nation (1948–2021)
- Mantifombi Dlamini, wife of Goodwill Zweilithini and former Queen of Zulu nation (1956–2021)
- Mangosuthu Buthelezi, politician and a Zulu prince (1928–2023)
- Dingane kaSenzangakhona, 2nd Zulu king and half-brother of Shaka (1795–1840)
- Dinuzulu kaCetshwayo, 5th Zulu king, not officially recognized (1868–1913)
- Buyelekhaya Dalindyebo, Aa! Zwelibanzi! King of the Thembu (born 1964)
- Sabata Dalindyebo, Aa! Jonguhlanga! King of the Thembu (1928–1986)
- Faku kaNgqungqushe, King of the Mpondo (1780–1867)
- Hintsa ka Khawuta, Aa! Zanzolo! King of Xhosa Nation (1780–1835)
- Khawuta kaGcaleka, Aa! Khala! King of the Xhosa Nation (1761–1804)
- Langalibalele, Hlubi king (1814–1889)
- Ingwenyama Mayitjha II, 7th Ndebele, king of Ndzundza-Mabhoko (1947–2005)
- Magogo kaDinuzulu, Zulu princess and mother of Mangosuthu Buthelezi (1900–1984)
- Mampuru II, king of the Marota (or Bapedi) (died c.1883)
- Lwandile Matanzima, Aa! Zwelenkosi! King of the Western Thembu (1970/71–2010)
- Luzuko Matiwane, Aa! Zwelozuko! King of AmaMpondomise (born 1978)
- Maselekwane Modjadji, Balobedu's 1st Rain Queen (died 1854)
- Masalanabo Modjadji, Balobedu's 2nd Rain Queen (died 1894)
- Khetoane Modjadji, Balobedu's 3rd Rain Queen (1869–1959)
- Makoma Modjadji, Balobedu's 4th Rain Queen (1905–1980)
- Mokope Modjadji, Balobedu's 5th Rain Queen (1936–2001)
- Makobo Modjadji, Balobedu's 6th Rain Queen (1978–2005)
- Mkabayi kaJama, Zulu princess and sister of Senzangakhona (1750–1843)
- Mpande, 3rd Zulu king and half-brother of Shaka (1798–1872)
- Mthimkhulu II, King of the AmaHlubi (1778–1818)
- Mzilikazi, king of the Matabele (1790–1868)
- Nandi, Mhlongo princess and mother of Shaka (1760–1827)
- Tutor Vulindlela Ndamase, Nyangelizwe! King of the Western Pondo (1921–1997)
- Ngqungqushe kaNyawuza, Mpondo King (1715/1760–1810/1815)
- Ngubengcuka, Aa! Vusani! prominent king of the abaThembu (died 1830)
- Nyabêla, King of the Ndzundza-Ndebele (1825/30 - 1902)
- Emma Sandile, Aa! Emma! Xhosa Princess and the daughter of King Sandile kaNgqika (1842–1892)
- Sandile kaNgqika, Aa! Mgolombane! Xhosa king of the Right Hand House of the Xhosa Nation (1820–1878)
- Zanesizwe Sandile, Aa! Zanesizwe! King of the Right Hand House of the Xhosa Nation (1956–2011)
- Noloyiso Sandile, Aa! Noloyiso! Zulu Princess and Rharhabe Regent Queen (1963–2020)
- Sarili kaHintsa, Aa! Krili! King Of The Xhosa Nation (c. 1810–1892)
- Botha Sigcau, Jongilizwe! King of the Eastern Pondo (1913–1978)
- Xolilizwe Sigcawu, Aa! Xolilizwe! Xhosa King (1926–2005)
- Zwelonke Sigcawu, Aa! Zwelonke! Xhosa king (1968–2019)
- Sekhukhune, king of the Marota (or Bapedi) (1814–1882)
- Sekhukhune II, King of the Bapedi
- Sekwati, King of the Maroteng, more commonly known as the Bapedi people (1824–1861)
- Senzangakhona kaJama, Zulu king and father of Shaka (1762–1816)
- Shaka, founder of the Zulu nation (1787–1828)
- Solomon kaDinuzulu, 6th Zulu king, not officially recognized (1891–1933)
- Victor Thulare III, king of the Pedi (1980–2021)
- uZibhebhu kaMaphitha, Zulu prince and chief (1841–1904)

=== Tribal leaders and prophets ===
See also: Gcaleka rulers,
Rharhabe rulers
Ndwandwe people,
Xhosa Chiefs

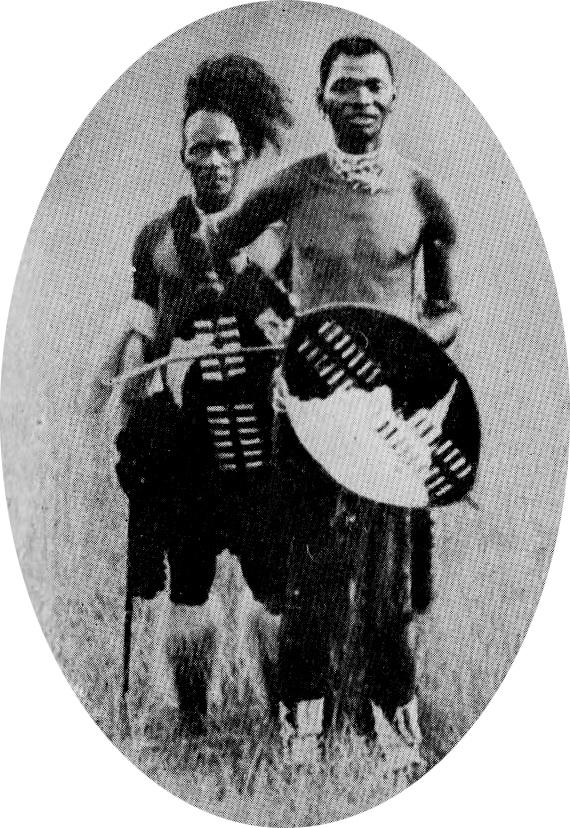
Bhambatha (on the right) with an attendant

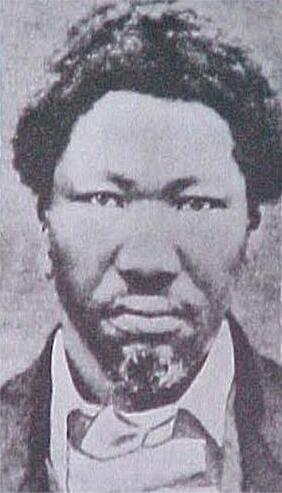
Adam Kok III

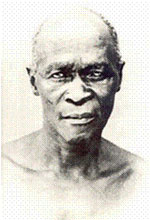
Chief Maqoma

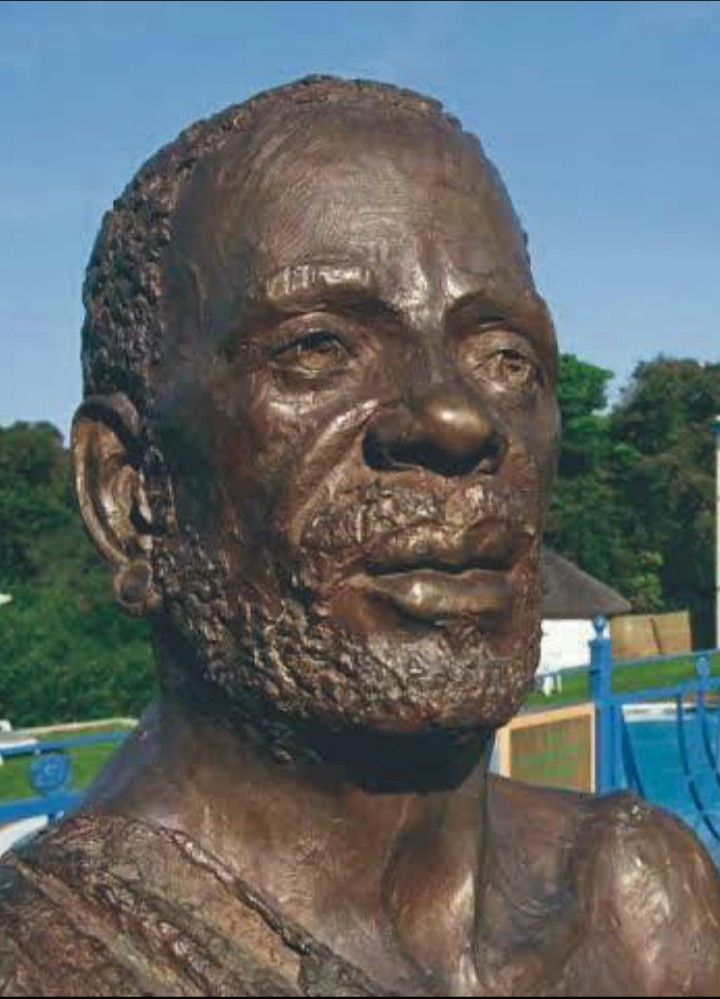
Chief Makgoba

- Bambatha kaMancinza, Zulu chief of the amaZondi clan and Bambatha Rebellion (1865–1906)
- Albert Luthuli, Zulu chief and political activist (1898–1967)
- Adam Kok III, Griqua leader (1811–1875)
- David Stuurman, Khoi chief and political activist (1773–1830)
- Thandatha Jongilizwe Mabandla, Aa! Jongilizwe! amaBhele chief, Tyume Valley, Alice, Ciskei (1926–2021)
- Makgoba, Lobedu (Bakgalaka) Chief (died 1895)
- Makhanda, amaXhosa prophet (died 1819)
- Maqoma, Aa! Jongumsobomvu! amaRharhabe chief (1798–1873)
- Skelewu Mbeki, the Chief of AmaMfengu (1828 – 1918)
- Mqalo, Amakhuze chief, Ciskei region (1916–2008)
- Moshoeshoe I, Basotho chief (c. 1786–1870)
- Nongqawuse, millennialist amaXhosa prophetess (c. 1840–1898)
- Ntsikana, amaXhosa prophet (1780–1821)
- Lennox Sebe, Chief of AmaNtinde (1926–1994)
- Ntsikayesizwe Sigcau, traditional leader of Lwandlolubomvu Traditional Council (1947–1996)
- Sigananda kaSokufa, Zulu aristocrat (c. 1815–1906)
- Hendrik Spoorbek, prophet and magician (died 1845)
- Mbongeleni Zondi, Zulu chief and great-grandson of Inkosi Bambatha kaMancinza (1969–2009)

== Atheists ==
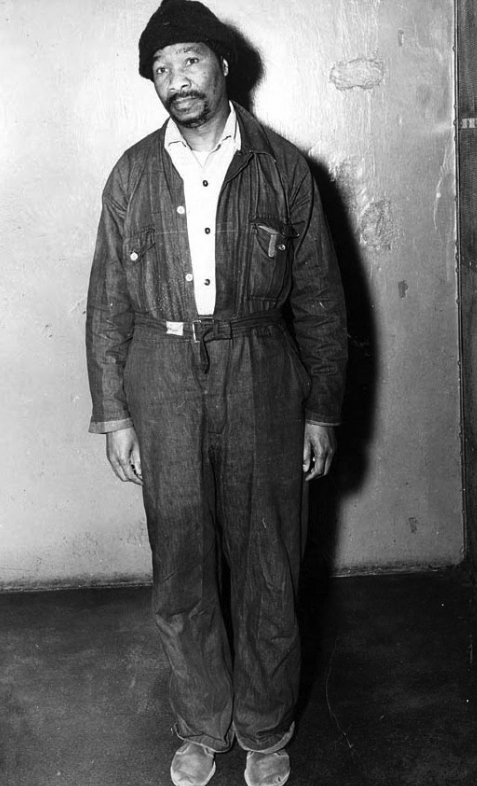
Govan Mbeki

- Zackie Achmat, AIDS activist, (born 1962)
- David Benatar, professor of philosophy (born 1966)
- Barry Duke, activist, journalist, editor of The Freethinker (born 1947)
- Nadine Gordimer, activist, writer, Nobel laureate (1923–2014)
- Chris Hani, politician (1942–1993)
- Ronnie Kasrils, politician (born 1938)
- Govan Mbeki, political activist and father of Thabo Mbeki (1910–2001)
- Jacques Rousseau, secular activist, social commentator (born 1971)
- Harold Rubin, visual artist, musician (1932–2020)
- Joe Slovo, politician (1926–1995)
- Lewis Wolpert, author, biologist, broadcaster (1929–2021)

== Prelates, clerics and evangelists ==
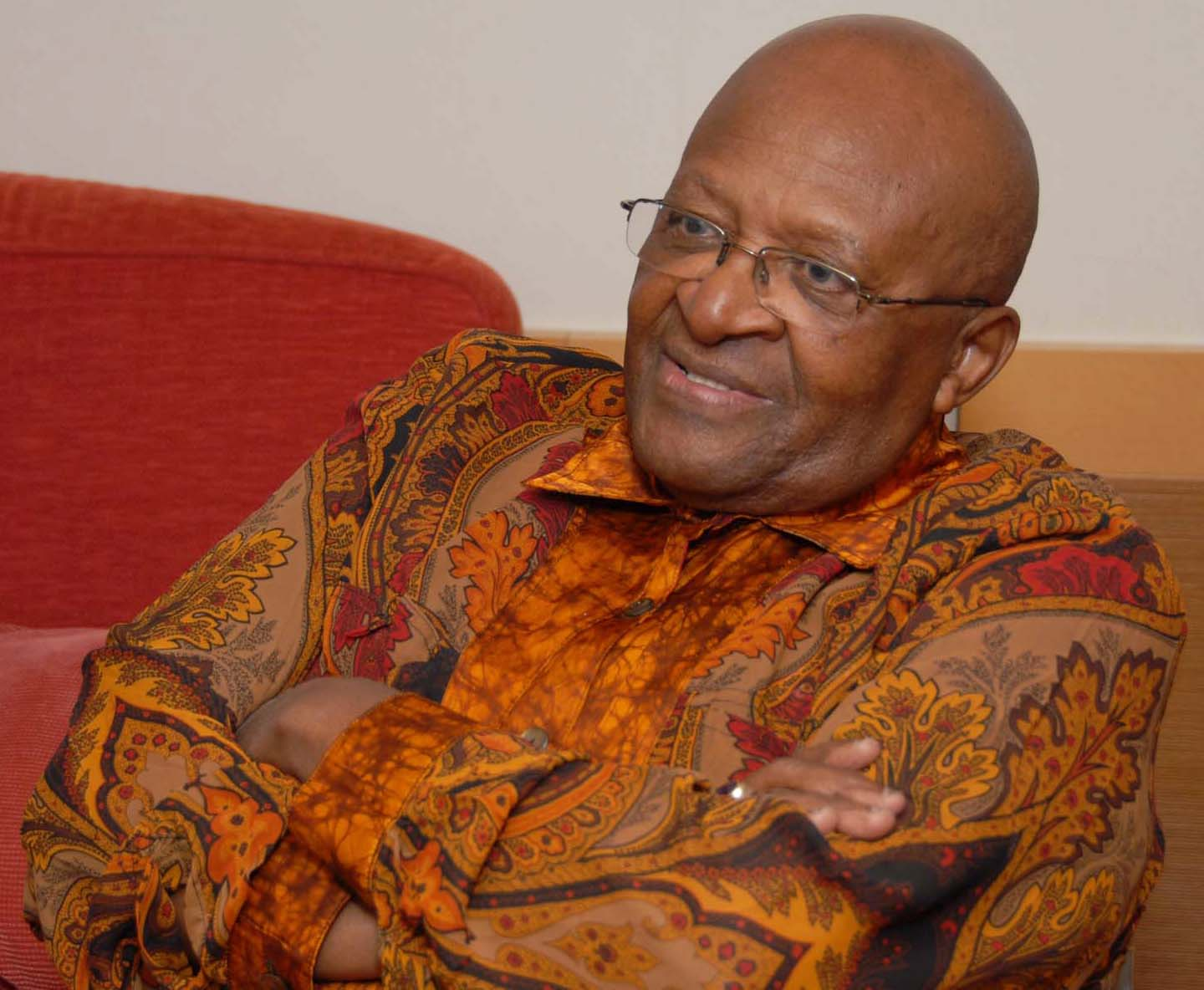
Desmond Tutu

- William Anderson, missionary (1769–1852)
- Nicholas Bhengu, evangelist and founder of Assemblies of God (1909–1986)
- Allan Boesak, cleric and anti-apartheid activist (born 1945)
- David Jacobus Bosch, missiologist and theologian (1929–1992)
- Angus Buchan, evangelist (born 1947)
- Frank Chikane, cleric and anti-apartheid activist (born 1951)
- John William Colenso, Anglican bishop of Natal (1814–1883)
- Mvume Dandala, former presiding bishop of the Methodist Church of Southern Africa and a former head of the All Africa Conference of Churches (born 1951)
- Ahmed Deedat (1918–2005)
- S.J. du Toit, cleric, Afrikaans language pioneer and founder member of the Genootskap vir Regte Afrikaners (1847–1911)
- Tshenuwani Farisani, South African politician, theologian, and Lutheran minister (1947–2025)
- Allan Hendrickse, cleric and MP (1927–2005)
- Denis Hurley, Roman Catholic Archbishop of Durban (1915–2004)
- Edward Lekganyane, the Zion Christian Church (ZCC) leader (1922–1967)
- Engenas Lekganyane, the Zion Christian Church (ZCC) founder (1885–1948)
- Albert Luthuli, cleric, politician and 1960 Nobel Peace Prize winner (c. 1898–1967)
- Thabo Makgoba, current Archbishop of Cape Town and Primate of the Anglican Church of Southern Africa (born 1960)
- Charlotte Maxeke, religious leader and political activist (1874–1939)
- Ray McCauley, head of Rhema church (1949–2024)
- Enoch Mgijima, Xhosa prophet and evangelist (1868–1928)
- Robert Moffat, missionary, Bible translator and founder of Kuruman (1795–1883)
- Smangaliso Mkhatshwa, Catholic priest (born 1939)
- Frederick Samuel Modise, founder of the International Pentecostal Holiness Church (1914–1998)
- Glayton Modise, the International Pentecostal Holiness Church leader (1940–2016)
- Andrew Murray (1828–1917)
- Zithulele Patrick Mvemve, South African Roman Catholic bishop (1941–2020)
- Selby Mvusi, theologian and artist (1929–1967)
- Joe Mzamane, Anglican priest, mayor and father of Mbulelo Mzamane (1918–1993)
- Mbulelo Mzamane, South African author, poet, and academic (1948–2014)
- Sitembele Mzamane, South African Anglican bishop (born 1952)
- Wilfrid Napier, cardinal of the Catholic Church (born 1941)
- Beyers Naudé, cleric and anti-apartheid activist (1915–2004)
- Jozua Naudé, pastor, school founder and co-founder of the Afrikaner Broederbond (1873–1948)
- Njongonkulu Ndungane, South African Anglican bishop and a former prisoner on Robben Island (born 1941)
- Carl Niehaus, theologian and former spokesman of South African president Nelson Mandela (born 1959)
- Albert Nolan, Catholic priest (1934–2022)
- Ntsikana, Christian Xhosa prophet, evangelist and hymn writer (1780–1821)
- John Philip, missionary (1775–1851)
- Barney Pityana, human rights lawyer and theologian (born 1945)
- Ambrose Reeves, Anglican bishop and opponent of Apartheid (1899–1980)
- Walter Rubusana, first deputy president of the ANC and cleric (1856–1936)
- David Russell, South African Anglican bishop (1938–2014)
- Isaiah Shembe, the Church of Nazareth founder (1865–1935)
- Benjamin Silinda, a founder of the Nazarene Revival (1925–2015)
- Tiyo Soga, Xhosa journalist, minister, translator, missionary evangelist, and composer of hymns (1829–1871)
- Desmond Tutu, cleric and Nobel Peace Prize winner (1931–2021)
- William Cullen Wilcox, missionary (1850–1928)

== Conservationists ==
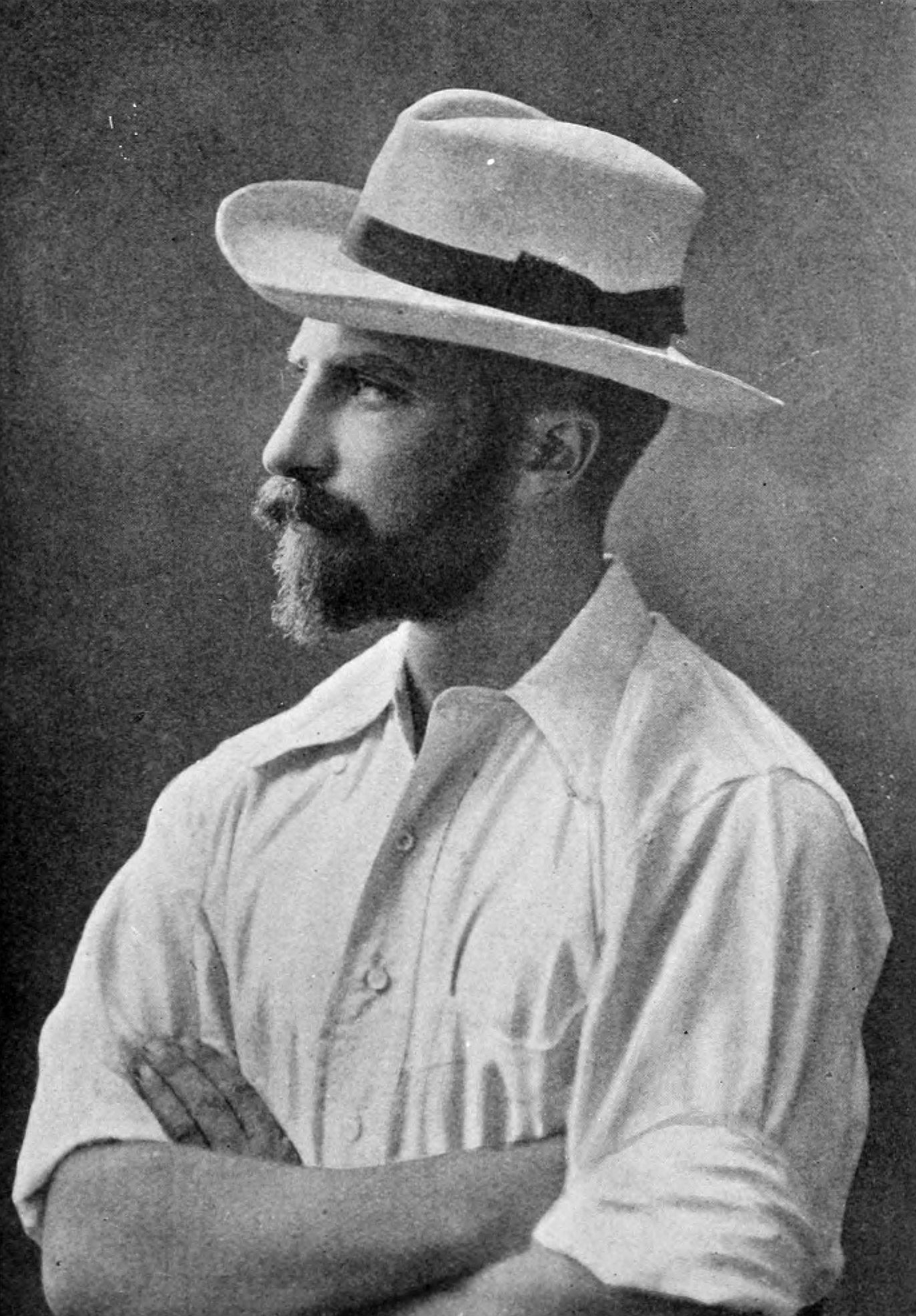
James Stevenson-Hamilton

- Ian Player (1927–2014)
- James Stevenson-Hamilton (1867–1957)
- John Varty (born 1950)

== Food ==
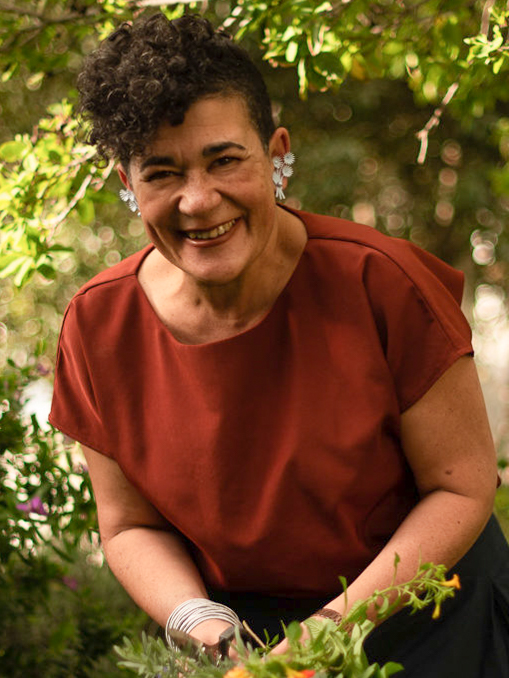
Karen Dudley

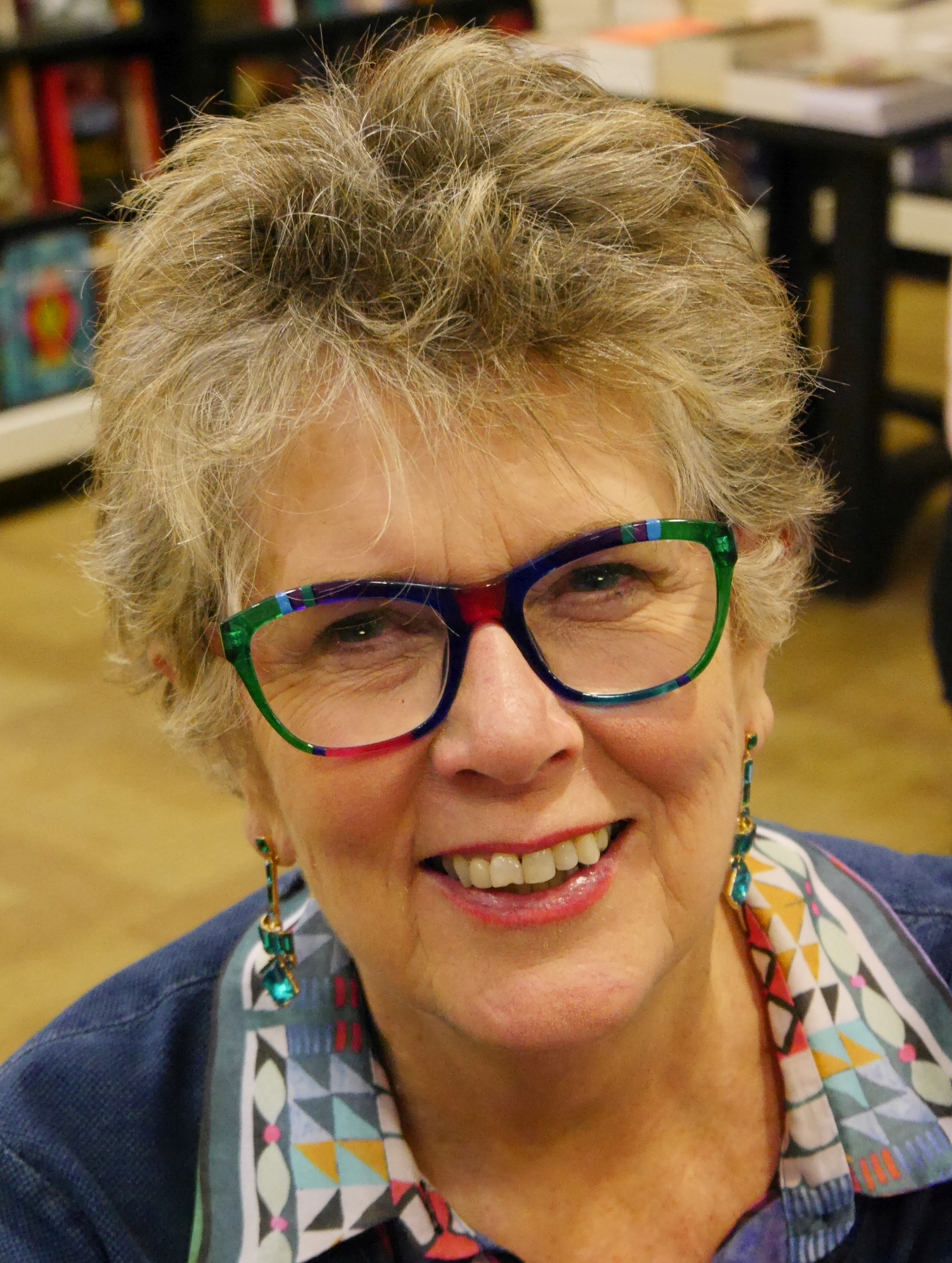
Prue Leith

- Bertus Basson (born 1979)
- Karen Dudley (born 1968)
- Prue Leith (born 1940)
- Abigail Mbalo-Mokoena
- Jenny Morris
- Nompumelelo Mqwebu (born 1977)
- Siba Mtongana (born 1984)
- Kamini Pather (born 1983)
- Reuben Riffel (born 1974)
- Lesego Semenya (1982–2021)
- Yudhika Sujanani
- Faldela Williams (1952–2014)

== Travelers, adventurers and pioneers ==
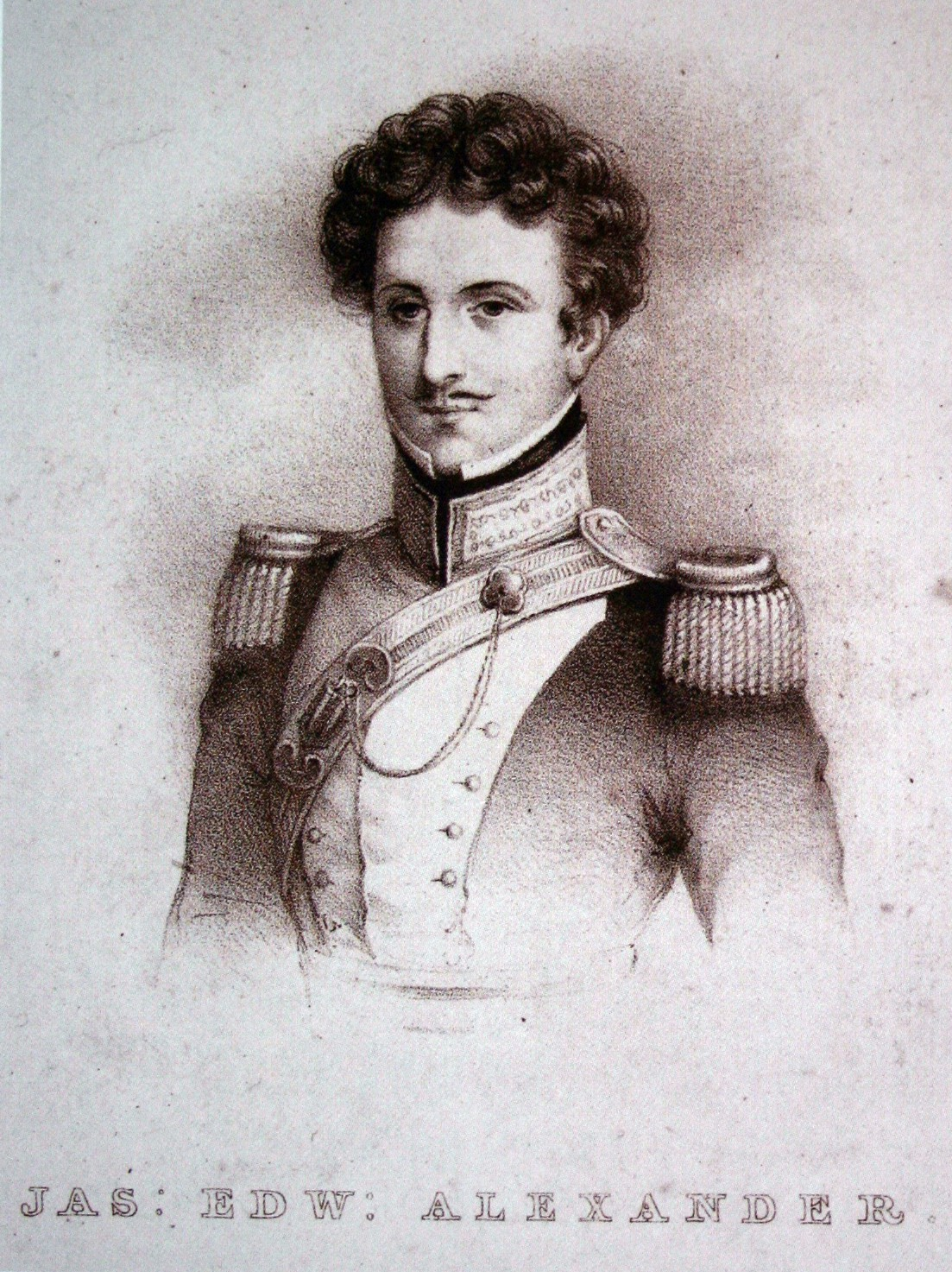
James Edward Alexander

- Alexander Biggar, colonial pioneer (1781–1838)
- Jeanne M. Borle, missionary and naturalist (1880 – ca. 1979)
- William John Burchell, naturalist traveler (1781–1863)
- Francisco de Almeida, adventurer buried in Cape Town (c. 1450–1510)
- Bartolomeu Dias, explorer who reached eastern Cape (c. 1450–1500)
- John Dunn, colonial pioneer (1833–1895)
- Robert Jacob Gordon, explorer, soldier, naturalist (1743–1795)
- Emil Holub, explorer (1847–1902)
- Nathaniel Isaacs, Natal traveler (1808–1872)
- Dick King, colonial pioneer (1813–1871)
- François Levaillant, Cape naturalist traveler (1753–1824)
- Karl Mauch, traveling geologist (1873–1875)
- Harriet A. Roche, Transvaal traveler (1835–1921)
- Carl Peter Thunberg, Cape naturalist traveler (1743–1828)
- Sibusiso Vilane, first black African to summit Mount Everest (born 1970)
- Kingsley Holgate, traveler and pioneer (born 1946)
- Mike Horn, explorer, traveler, environmentalist, adventurer (born 1966)
- James Alexander, explorer of the west coast and Namibia (1803–1885)
- Saray Khumalo, explorer and mountaineer (born 1972)

== Criminals ==
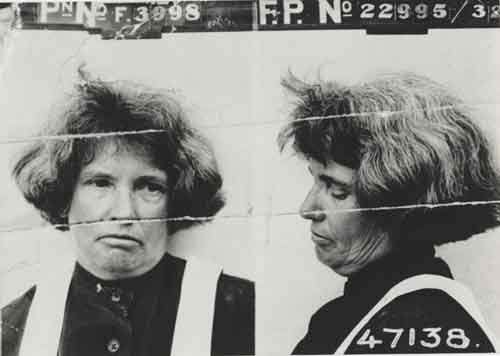
Daisy de Melker

- Angelo Agrizzi, South African convicted criminal and former chief operating officer of Bosasa,
- Thabo Bester, convicted criminal, rapist and serial killer (born 1986)
- Daisy de Melker, second woman to be hanged for murder under the Union of South Africa (1886–1932)
- William Foster, leader of the Foster Gang
- Allan Heyl, Stander Gang member and bank robber (died 2020)
- Cedric Maake, serial killer (born 1965)
- Bulelani Mabhayi, serial killer (born 1974)
- Nandipha Magudumana, fraudster, corruptionst, con-artist, prison escaper, violater of bodies (born 1989)
- Simon Majola, robber and serial killer who, with (born 1968)
- Fanuel Makamu, robber, rapist and serial killer (born 1977)
- Andries Makgae, serial killer and rapist (born 1962)
- Vusimuzi Matlala, South African criminal
- Lee McCall, Stander Gang member and bank robber (1950–1984)
- Nicholas Lungisa Ncama, rapist and serial killer
- Velaphi Ndlangamandla, robber and serial killer (born 1966)
- Solomon Ngobeni, last person to be executed by the government of South Africa (died 1989)
- Oscar Pistorius, double amputee, former professional sprinter, and convicted murderer (born 1986)
- Butana Almond Nofomela, murderer (born 1957)
- Gert van Rooyen, paedophile (1938–1990)
- Khangayi Sedumedi, serial killer and rapist (born 1977)
- Schabir Shaik, fraudster
- Norman Afzal Simons, rapist and serial killer (born 1967)
- Moses Sithole, convicted serial rapist and murderer (born 1964)
- Sandra Smith (criminal), South African woman sentenced to death for murder, the last woman to be executed in the country (1965–1989)
- Rashied Staggie, crime boss (1961–2019)
- Andre Stander, gang member (1946–1984)
- Thozamile Taki, serial killer (born 1971)
- Sipho Thwala, rapist and serial killer (born 1968)
- Dorethea van der Merwe, first woman to be hanged for murder under the Union of South Africa
- Bulelani Vukwana, spree killer (c. 1973–2002)
- Elias Xitavhudzi, serial killer
- Christopher Mhlengwa Zikode, rapist and serial killer (born 1975)

== Other ==
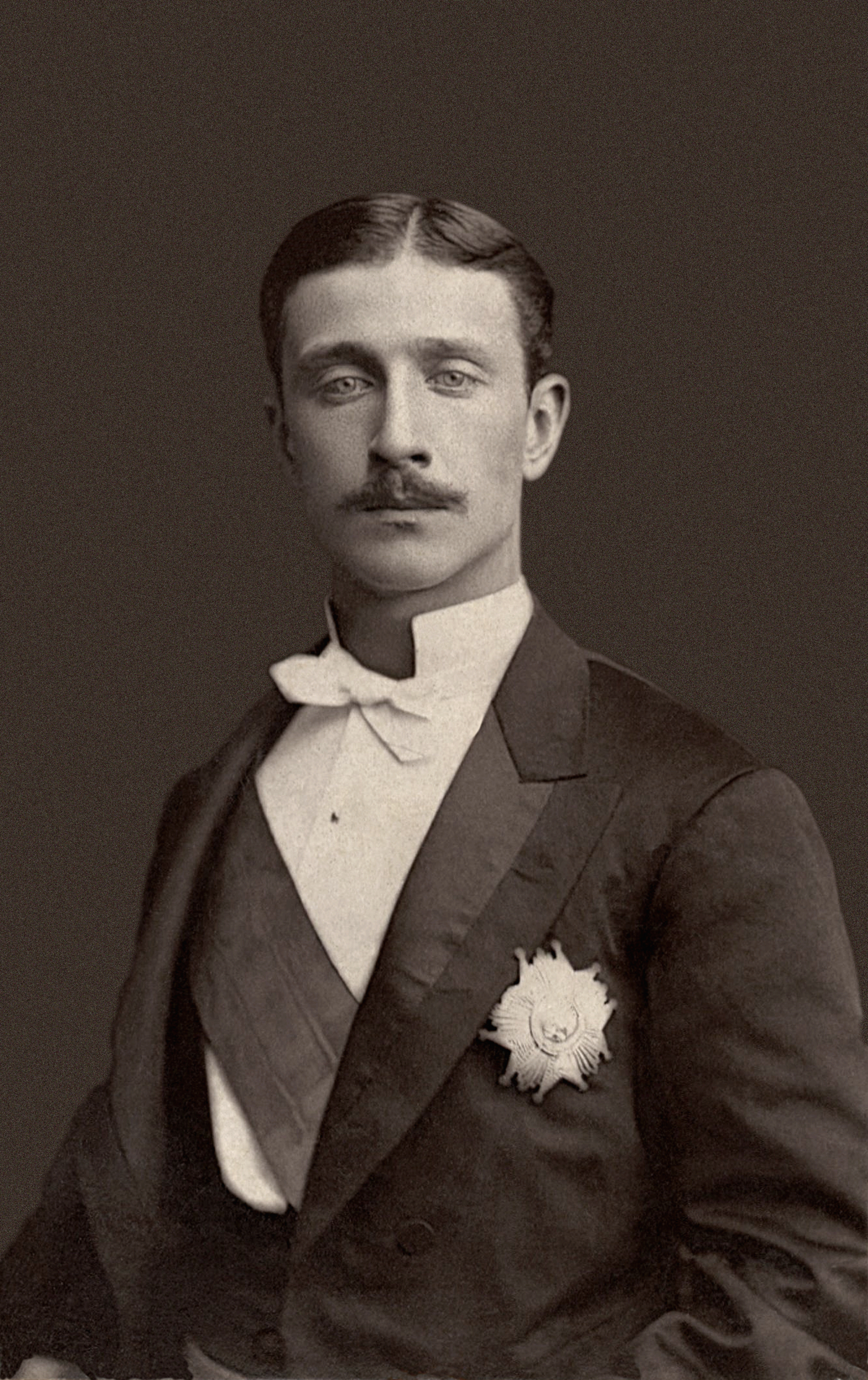
Louis-Napoléon, Prince Imperial

- Sarah Baartman, Khoekhoe woman who was exhibited as a freak show attraction (1789–1815)
- Sir Herbert Baker, influential in South African architecture (1862–1946)
- Nozipho Bhengu, woman whose death was from an AIDS-related illness (1974–2006)
- Denise Darvall, considered to be donor for the first human heart transplant (1943–1967)
- Babita Deokaran, South African civil servant and whistleblower (1968–2021)
- Ncoza Dlova, heralded as first black female head of University of KwaZulu-Natal's School of Clinical Medicine
- Napoléon Eugène, last of Napoleons who died in Zulu war (1856–1879)
- Emily Hobhouse, African British welfare campaigner for South Africans (1860–1926)
- John Hutchinson, thorough contributor to South African botany (1884–1972)
- Nkosi Johnson, child who died of AIDS (1989–2001)
- Isabel Jean Jones, early consumer advocate journalist (died 2008)
- Masego Kgomo, South African girl murdered (1999–2009)
- Marie Koopmans-de Wet, South African philanthropist and hostess (1834–1906)
- Sandra Laing, racial classification victim (born 1955)
- Paul Lloyd Jr, first South African wrestler to wrestle in WWE, son of successful SA wrestling promoter Paul Lloyd (born 1981)
- Asnath Mahapa, first female South African pilot (born 1979)
- Joe Mamasela, former Apartheid government spy (born 1953)
- Nomkhitha Virginia Mashinini, South African apartheid detainee, the mother of political figure Tsietsi Mashinini, and a community worker (1935–2008)
- Leigh Matthews, South African university student, kidnapped and murdered (1983–2004)
- Breaker Morant, Australian Boer War soldier executed by the British Army (1864–1902)
- Uyinene Mrwetyana, South African student, raped and murdered (2000–2019)
- Hastings Ndlovu, poster victim of the Soweto riots (1961–1976)
- Hector Pieterson, poster victim of the Soweto riots (1964–1976)
- Mrs. Ples, hominid fossil (born c. 2.6 to 2.8 million years ago)
- Raymond Rahme, first African to reach a final table at a World Series of Poker Main Event, finishing third (born 1945)
- Willem Ratte, soldier and criminal (born 1948)
- Rosenkowitz sextuplets, first known set of sextuplets to survive their infancy (born 1974)
- Thandi Sibisi, art dealer, gallery owner (born 1986)
- Maki Skosana, necklaced due to be suspected as a police informer (1961–1985)
- Reeva Steenkamp, South African model and paralegal (1983–2013)
- Adam Tas, colonial activist (1668–1722)
- Andries Tatane, Ficksburg activist killed by police (1978–2011)
- Taung Child, hominid fossil (born c. 2.5 million years ago)
- Louis Washkansky, recipient of first human heart transplant (1913–1967)
- Wolraad Woltemade, colonial hero figure (c. 1708–1773)

== See also ==
- Great South Africans, television program listing the 100 greatest South Africans as voted for by viewers
- List of South African office-holders
- List of Southern Ndebele people
- List of State leaders in the 20th century (1951–2000)
- List of white Africans of European ancestry
- List of Xhosa people
- List of Zulu people
- Lists of people by nationality
- They Shaped Our Century, survey by Media24 in 1999 about 100 most influential South Africans (and people associated with South Africa) of the twentieth century
