= Zephania Mothopeng =

South African political activist (1913 – 1990)

Zephania Lekoame Mothopeng (10 September 1913 – 23 October 1990) was a South African political activist and member of the Pan-Africanist Congress (PAC).

== Early life ==
Mothopeng was born near Vrede in Free State, and he had five siblings. He was educated at St. Mary's Anglican School, in Daggakraal, and completed his education at the St. Peters Secondary School at Rosettenville in Johannesburg in 1937, where he matriculated. After matriculation, he trained as a teacher at Adams College in Kwa-Zulu Natal, where he and three other colleagues defiantly sat on the seats reserved for European staff members. For this they were dismissed but later reinstated. He completed his postgraduate teachers diploma at the college in 1940.

In 1941, Mothopeng took up a teaching post at Orlando Secondary School in Soweto and settled in Johannesburg. He served as president of the Transvaal Teachers Association in 1950. It was in this capacity that he became one of the most outspoken opponents of the introduction of Bantu education.

== Political history ==
Mothopeng began his struggle against apartheid in 1943 as a founding member of the African National Congress Youth League. He left the African National Congress (ANC) because of the rise of the Freedom Charter, a multiracial philosophy. He left the ANC with Robert Sobukwe in 1959 and became a founding member of the Pan-Africanist Congress (PAC). After forming the PAC, he was at the forefront of their Positive Action campaign against pass laws. The campaign was defined by Pan Africanists as the application of non-violent mass action in the form of strikes, boycotts and non-collaboration with the oppressive authorities.

As a member of the PAC, Mothopeng was arrested several times, first in 1960 for two years for taking part in the Defiance Campaign. He was released in 1962 on completion of his jail term. He was detained again in 1964 for furthering the aims of a banned organisation, the PAC. His arrest followed a massive police swoop on the PAC underground movement called Azanian People's Liberation Army (APLA), formerly known as Poqo. APLA was the military wing of the Pan Africanist Congress. Mothopeng, John Ganya, Mark Shinners, and others, played a leading role in establishing contact with the external mission of the PAC in Tanzania, recruiting new members to the PAC, establishing underground cells, and sending recruits outside the country to join APLA in exile.

Mothopeng served a three-year sentence on Robben Island for furthering the aims of the PAC. He served alongside Nelson Mandela on Robben Island before being released in 1967. After his release he was banished to QwaQwa in the Free State but only stayed for six months before returning to his home in Johannesburg.

He was arrested again in August 1976 in connection with the Soweto uprisings after mobilising and organising students in Soweto. For this offense, he was accused number one at the Bethal Trial, where he was charged with conspiracy and treason. He was arrested under the terrorism act, and his charges included inciting 16 June Soweto Uprisings. The Bethal Trial was the only secret political trial ever held in apartheid South Africa. He was elected as the president of the PAC in 1986 while in prison.

Mothopeng was sentenced to Robben Island again where he was to serve two 15-year terms of imprisonment. He was severely tortured in jail. Mothopeng was among those who reported police torture because four other detainees had died in detention.

Mothopeng became ill with cancer of the throat while in prison. He was unconditionally released by President F. W. de Klerk in 1988. He rejected calls to join political talks that black people should have all the power. Under Mothopeng, the PAC refused to join the negotiations on democracy with the African National Congress under President F. W. de Klerk as the Pan-Africanist Congress believed that only guerrilla warfare would end white minority rule. After his early release in November 1988, he settled in Soweto but never recovered his health.

== Personal life ==
On 10 September 1941, Mothopeng married Urbania Lonake. In 1942, the couple moved into a municipal four-roomed house in Orlando West. They had four children, Locksley, Sheila, John and Lancelot.

While in prison, Urbania was out of work because she suffered from severe arthritis.

== Death and legacy ==
On 23 October 1990, Mothopeng died from chest and lung cancer and pneumonia at 78. He was known as the "Lion of Azania". Mothopeng is buried with his wife in Avalon Cemetery.

In a ceremony on 22 October 2016, Mothopeng was posthumously honoured when Pela Street, close to Vilakazi Street in Orlando West, Soweto, was renamed Zephania Mothopeng Street. The renaming is in line with the City of Johannesburg's Policy on the Naming and Renaming of Streets and Other Public Places. Zephania Mothopeng Street links with the Hector Pieterson Precinct.
