= Moletsane High School =

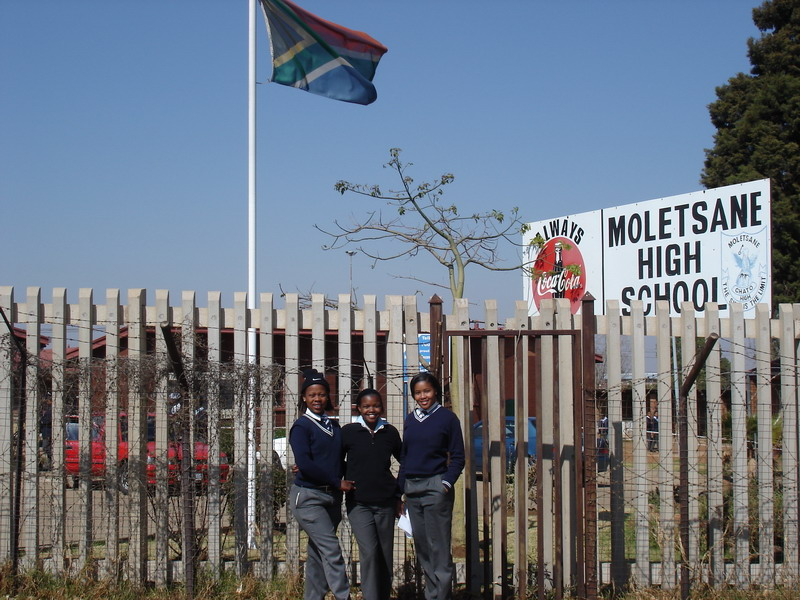

Location
- 26.2545°S 27.8506°E

Information
- Type: State school
- Established: 1972
- School code: 700121574
- Principal: Mr B.A Setshedi (2010)
- Enrolment: 1124
- Colours: blue and white

Moletsane High School is a government secondary school in Soweto, South Africa. Founded in 1972 it became a secondary school in 1976. Students from the school were involved in the Soweto Uprising in 1976. The school's public/private partnership and the school's improvements in its results were praised by the South African Minister for Education.

In 2010, the principal was B.A Setshedi who oversees a school that focuses on maths and physics.

== History ==
The school was created in 1972 and became a secondary school in 1976, the same year as the Soweto Uprising. The uprising was led by Soweto schoolchildren protesting the imposition of Afrikaans as the language to be used in schools. Children from Moletsane, Naledi High School and Morris Isaacson High School were amongst those involved from the early morning of 16 June 1976. The protests led to school children being shot and South African politics being condemned internationally.

The following August the South African police raided the school and shot two children, killing one and wounding the other. Eighteen teachers and over 100 students were arrested by the police, who said that children were receiving lessons in "making bombs and booby traps". In 1985 police visited the school and fired tear gas, which affected both the school and the nearby Entokozweni Early Learning Centre, a day care. The incident was reported internationally and the police said that they were trying to stop Moletsane students from joining a boycott, an idea already rejected by the students.

In 2006 the school employed under 40 educators to teach over 1,300 pupils. The school had a partnership with the investment company Brait Foundation which continues today. Brait said that part of their social responsibility was to improve education for disadvantaged communities. When the foundation first got involved the pass rate was 46%; this increased to over 80% between 2002 and 2005. Brait also quoted that in 2005 the year 12 students achieved the highest pass rate for any school in Soweto.

The school has created and stocked a library for students with help from a non-government organisation called "READ". Construction of a new hall to seat 1200 pupils was started in 2005. The contractors did the majority of the work but general labour on the site was done by teachers and friends of the school. The latter also made donations that paid for the school to purchase chairs for the new hall. It was opened by Minister for Education Naledi Pandor in May 2006, who praised the school's private-public partnership and the dedication of the school to maths and science.

Since 2007 when there were over 1500 pupils and 46 staff the number of pupils and educators has been declining. The number of students reported for 2013 is 1,124. The school was described as "excellent" in 2006 based on its transformation from what had been a failing school.
