= Teboho MacDonald Mashinini =

South African activist and student leader of the Soweto Uprising

Teboho "Tsietsi" Mashinini
- Born: 27 January 1957; Soweto Jabavu
- Died: 1990 (aged 32–33); Guinea
- Other name: Tsietsi
- Education: Morris Isaacson High School
- Occupation: Political Activist
- Known for: 1976 Student Uprising
- Successor: Khotso Seatlholo
- Spouse: Welma Albertine Wani Campbell
- Children: 2
- Parent(s): Nomkhitha Virginia Mashinini, Ramothibi Mashinini
- Relatives: Mpho Vincent Mashinini

Teboho "Tsietsi" MacDonald Mashinini (born 27 January 1957 – 1990) was a South African anti-apartheid activist and prominent student leader during the Soweto uprising.

== Life ==
Teboho Tsietsi Mashinini was born in 1957, 27 January. He was the second of 13 children of Ramothibe (father) and Nomkhitha Virginia (mother) Mashinini. He was a bright, popular and successful student at Morris Isaacson High School in Soweto, where he was the head of the debate team and president of the Methodist Wesley Guild.

A move by South Africa's apartheid government to make the language Afrikaans an equal mandatory language of education for all South Africans in conjunction with English was extremely unpopular with black and English-speaking South African students.

A student himself, Mashinini planned a mass demonstration by students for 16 June 1976. This demonstration would become known as the Soweto Uprising, lasting for three days, during which several hundred people were killed.

Having been identified as the leader of the uprising by the South African government, Mashinini fled South Africa in exile, first to London then later to various other African countries, including Liberia, where he was briefly married to Miss Liberia 1977, Welma Campbell.

Mashinini died under mysterious circumstances, possibly of homicide, in the summer of 1990 while in exile in Guinea. On 4 August 1990, his body was repatriated to South Africa, where he was interred in Avalon Cemetery. His grave bears the epitaph "Black Power".

== Legacy ==
There is a statue of Teboho Mashinini by Johannes Phokela in the grounds of his old school that was unveiled on 1 May 2010 by Amos Masondo, the Mayor of Johannesburg.

== See also ==
- Khotso Seatlholo
- Hastings Ndlovu
- Hector Pieterson
- Murphy Morobe
- Seth Mazibuko
