= Bushbuckridge =

- Town
- Mapulaneng
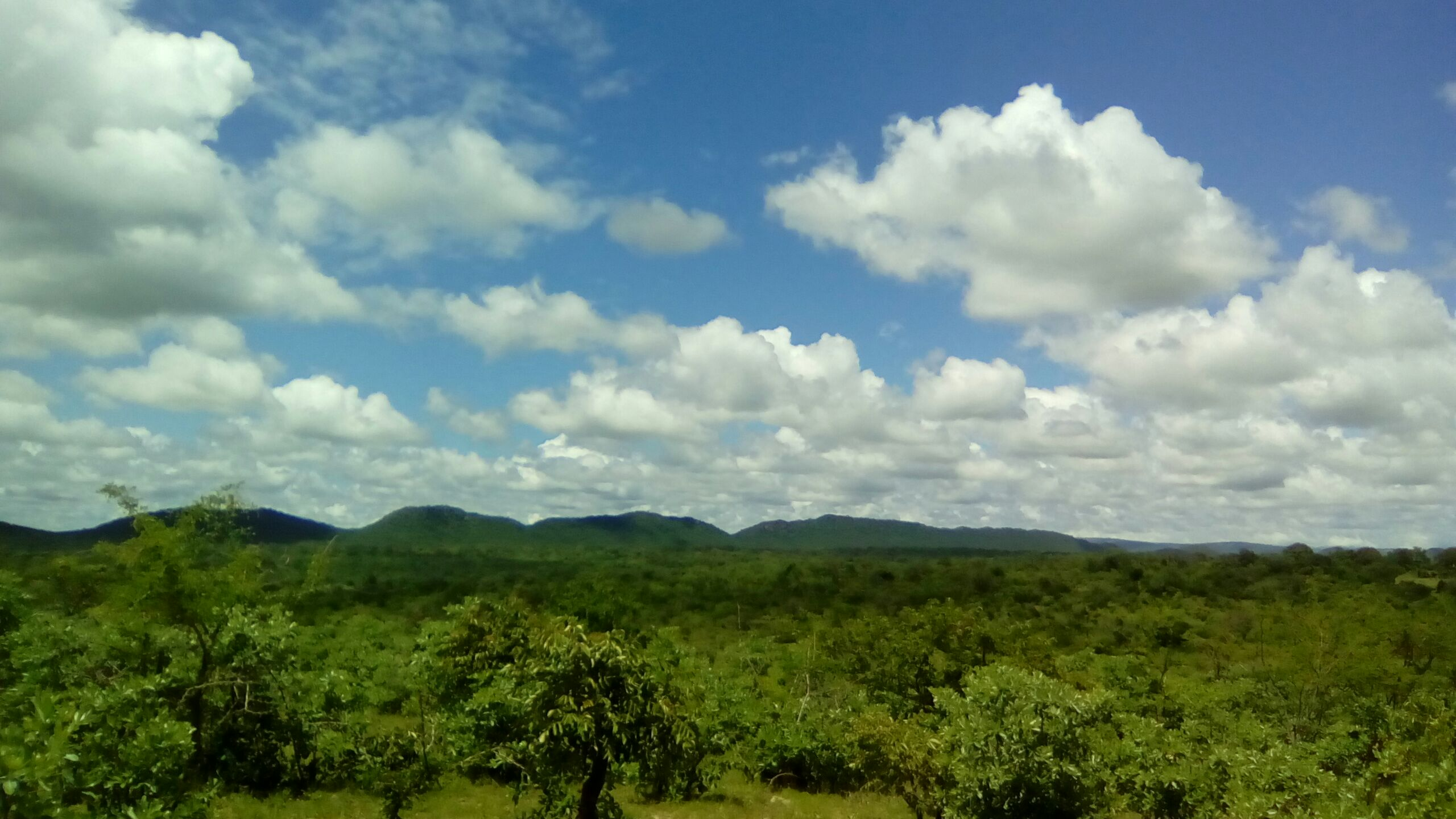
- Mountains in BushBuckridge during day time.
- Interactive map of Bushbuckridge
- Country: South Africa
- Province: Mpumalanga
- District: Ehlanzeni
- Municipality: Bushbuckridge

Bushbuckridge (also known as Mapulaneng) is the main town in Bushbuckridge Local Municipality, Ehlanzeni District, Mpumalanga, South Africa. It grew around a trading store that opened in 1884, and is named after the large herds of bushbuck found here in the 1880s, and the prominent ridge in the southeastern part of the municipality.

The suburbs and rural areas to the south of Bushbuckridge constitute a "sub place", called Bushbuckridge NU with a 2011 population of 1070, covering 1,587.56 square kilometres (613 sq mi).

== Notable people ==
- Frank Chikane (1951), civil servant, writer and cleric
- Themba Godi - politician, former member of the Parliament of South Africa
- Ronald Lamola - Minister of Justice and Correctional Services
- Letago Madiba - South Africa women's national football team player
- Jeff Maluleke - musician
- Sasekani Manzini - Mpumalanga MEC for Health
- Katlego Mashego - member South Africa national football team
- Mzilikazi wa Afrika - investigative journalist
- Hungani Ndlovu - actor
- Brighton Ngoma - actor
- David Nyathi - former South Africa national football team player, coach
- Sam Nzima - photographer, who took what became the well known image of Hector Pieterson for the Soweto uprising
- Trevor Nyakane - Rugby player for the Bulls and the South Africa national rugby team
