= Lilydale =

Lilydale, Lily Dale, Lillydale or Lilly Dale may refer to:

Australia

- Lilydale, Tasmania, a small town in Northern Tasmania
- Lilydale, Victoria, a suburb of Melbourne
  - Lilydale railway line, a suburban electric railway in Melbourne
  - Lilydale railway station, a railway station in Melbourne
  - Lillydale Lake, a lake in Melbourne

Canada

- Lilydale, Nova Scotia

South Africa

- Lillydale, Mpumalanga, a town in South Africa

United States

- Lilydale, Chicago
- Lilly Dale, Indiana, an unincorporated community
- Lilydale, Minnesota, a town south of St. Paul
- Lily Dale, New York, a spiritualist community in western New York
- Lillydale, Monroe County, West Virginia, an unincorporated community
- Lillydale, Wyoming County, West Virginia, an unincorporated community
