= Johannes Phokela =

South African painter and sculptor

- Born: 1966 (age 59–60); Soweto, South Africa
- Education: Federated Union of Black Artists (FUBA) Academy, Johannesburg, South Africa
- Alma mater: Camberwell College of Art, University of the Arts, London; Royal College of Art, London

Johannes Phokela (born 1966) is a South African painter and sculptor.

== Background ==
Johannes Phokela was born in Soweto, South Africa in 1966 and trained under Durant Sihlali.

When Phokela was a child he witnessed the Soweto uprising and later created memorials regarding the event, including a statue of Teboho MacDonald Mashinini on the grounds of Morris Isaacson High School unveiled on 1 May 2010, and a large sculptural mural of a book sitting in a lot opposite of the school.

Phokela began his studies at the Federated Union of Black Artists, Johannesburg before concluding his studies at the Royal College of Art, London.

Phokela's works are displayed at the South African National Gallery, the Smithsonian National Museum for African Art in the United States of America, and the South African High Commission in London.

Phokela has lived and worked in both London and Johannesburg.

== Career ==
Phokela's artistic practice is primarily composed of oil on canvas painting in the style of older Dutch Golden Age painting, often Phokela's paintings will include white grids as well. Regarding the use of grids in his paintings, Phokela had stated that the grid "gives another dimension to the work; it is a device to challenge the viewer's perception of the image and form beneath. It is intended to have an effect like an ornamental frame surrounding a mirror, or a glass pane mounting a picture. Compositionally, the grid can unify pictorial space or even deny it"

Phokela is influenced by traditional Western mediums, primarily using oil paint. Phokela takes inspiration from artists such as Peter Paul Rubens and old masters from the Enlightenment era.

Phokela's most recognized work is his 2004 painting, Apotheosis. The piece resembles an altarpiece in that it has an arched top.

On the topic of the production of art, Phokela had stated "Once you have the work it doesn’t really matter who produced it what counts is the quality. But unfortunately, the contemporary international art scene has this tendency to dwell on the background of the artist”

== Exhibitions ==
- Johannes Phokela, Rack Gallery, London, May - July 1998
- Johannes Phokela, I like my Neighbours, Johannesburg, South Africa; Gallery MOMO, 2009
- Johannes Phokela, The World of the Sacred and the Profane, Johannesburg, South Africa; Gallery AOP, 2015
- Johannes Phokela, ONLY SUN IN THE SKY KNOWS HOW I FEEL – (A LUCID DREAM), Cape Town, Zeitz Mocaa Museum, 2021
