= Todd Gray (artist) =

American artist

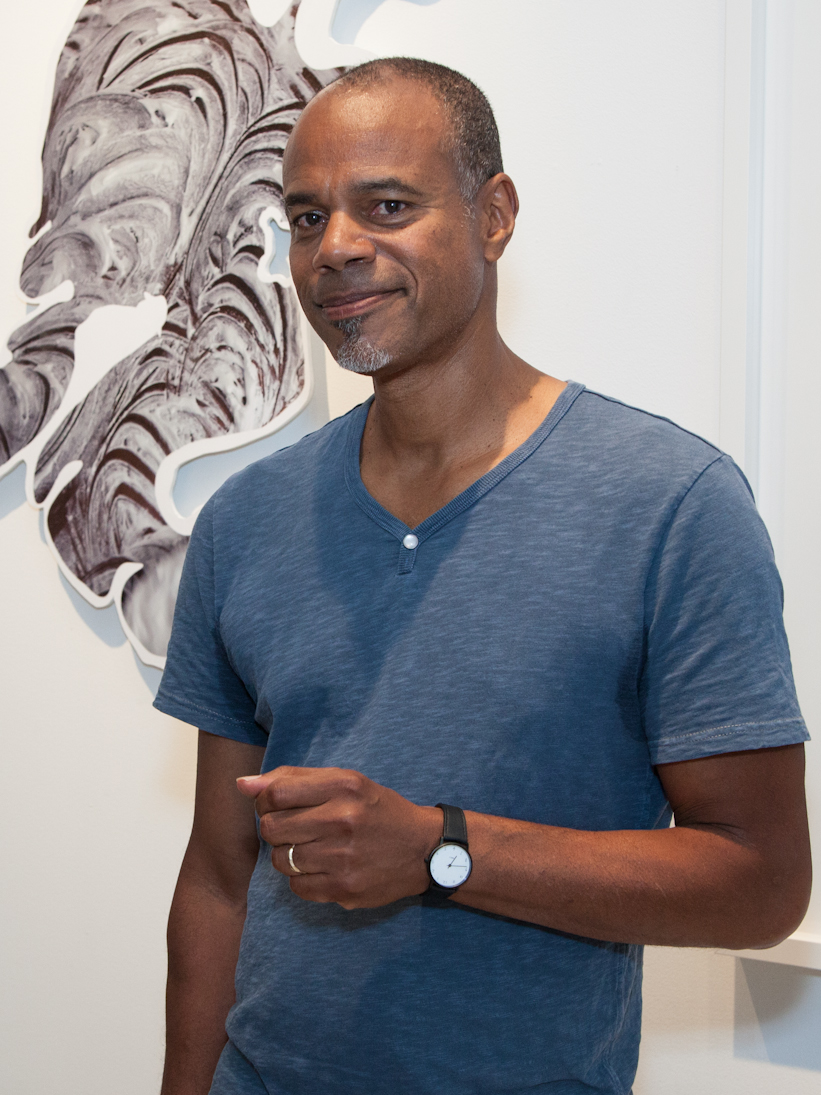
- Gray in 2012
- Born: 1954 (age 71–72); Los Angeles, California
- Education: California Institute of the Arts
- Known for: Photo, performance, sculpture, installation
- Website: toddgrayart.com

Todd Gray (born 1954) works in photography, performance and, sculpture as a contemporary artist who lives and works in Los Angeles, California and Akwidaa, Ghana.

Writing in the catalogue for the exhibition Black is, Black Ain't at the Renaissance Society, Chicago, Amy M. Mooney writes "critics have noted that Gray's work is "fluent in cultural iconography, driven by introspection, and steeped in issues of corporate politics and racial identity" and that his self-portraits thwart a traditional read of the exterior likeness". Gray describes himself as an artist and activist who primarily focuses on issues of race, class, gender, and colonialism, and uses these lenses to challenge binaries in the past and present. In general, his work aims to challenge the viewer both by what he is including and what he is leaving out.

== Early life and education ==
Gray was born in 1954 in Los Angeles, California. He got his Bachelor of Fine Arts from the California Institute of the Arts (CalArts), Valencia, California in 1979 and his Master of Fine Arts from CalArts in 1989.

== Early career ==
Gray first turned onto photography in high school, when he took a class in it. Beginning in the early 1970s while still in high school, Gray worked as a commercial photographer in the music industry, photographing rock and R&B acts such as the Jackson 5, Stevie Wonder and Gladys Knight. Gray shot his first album cover at age 17. He continued to do so throughout the 1970s, allowing him to pay for college and then art school. To date, Gray has shot over 100 album covers.

== Later/Current career ==
After graduating with his BFA from CalArts, Gray was asked by Michael Jackson to become his personal photographer, which he did in the period 1979–1983, during the time of Jackson's landmark albums Off the Wall and Thriller. When Gray asked Michael's manager Ron Weisner why Michael wanted him specifically, Ron responded that Michael said "I like Todd because he doesn't talk much." Gray described Jackson as being "very sensitive to the overt racism of the American press, well aware that a caption can completely alter the context of a photograph, perpetuating negative stereotypes. He scrutinized every photograph I made and only the images he approved were released to the press." Gray's work became greatly influenced by Michael Jackson's exploration of race and gender, and to this day uses photographs of Jackson in his art. His work is often consisted of multilayered frames with photographs of only parts of Jackson shown, such as a hand or his jacket, adding to the notion of Jackson as a superior metaphysical being. These images are accompanied by more recent photographs of nature or interiors, many of which he shoots in Ghana.

== Exhibitions ==
Gray has exhibited work at Meliksetain Briggs Gallery, Los Angeles. Gray's past solo and group exhibitions include: Hammer Museum, Los Angeles; Studio Museum, Harlem, NY; USC Fisher Museum of Art, Los Angeles; Luckman Gallery, Cal State University, Los Angeles; California African American Museum, Los Angeles; Tucson Museum of Art; Detroit Museum of Art; Renaissance Society, University of Chicago, among others. Some of his performance works have been presented at The Roy & Edna Disney Cal/Arts Theater; (REDCAT), Los Angeles; Academy of Media Arts, Cologne, and the Japanese American National Museum, Los Angeles. [2] For his 2016 exhibition A Place That Looks Like Home "re-frames and re-contextualizes images from his personal archive that spans over forty years of his career as a photographer, sculptor and performance artist." In his 2017 exhibition at the Museum of the African Diaspora, Gray explored Michael Jackson in terms of "mental colonialism." In 2017, Gray also created Pluralities of Being which was exhibited from August 31 to October 7 in the Gallery MOMO in Johannesburg, South Africa. This was Gray's first solo exhibit in South Africa and featured work he created during his residency at the NIROX Foundation's sculpture park in Johannesburg. Pluralities of Being was next exhibited at the Palm Springs Art Museum from December 15, 2018, to April 7, 2019. In 2018, Gray's work was included in Michael Jackson: On the Wall at the National Portrait Gallery in London which ran until October 21, 2018. In 2019, Gray was featured as an artist in the Whitney Museum of American Art's 2019 Biennial. Gray's most recent work Cartesian Gris Gris explores "the continued fallout of European colonialism in Africa." This collection of photographs was exhibited at the David Lewis Gallery in New York City in July 2019. In 2019 Gray was selected to be on display at the Pomona College Museum of Art, which features his piece, "Euclidean Gris Gris," among others. His exhibition will stay up until May 17, 2020. His exhibition in 2016, a part of the Hammer museum in Los Angeles, took place outside the confines of the museum itself. Gray wore the clothes of Ray Manzarek, who was one of the founding members of the Doors, and also a friend of Gray's; for a year. In order to see the "exhibition," one had to happen upon Gray himself during the months the exhibition was taking place.

== Collections ==
Gray's work is represented in the following collections: California Community Foundation, J. Paul Getty Museum, [Los Angeles County Museum of Art (LACMA), Museum of Contemporary Art (MOCA), National Gallery of Art, National Gallery of Canada, National Gallery of Victoria, Studio Museum in Harlem, University of Connecticut, University of Parma (Italy), Whitney Museum of American Art, among others.

== Other works ==
On October 21, 2009, Gray published a book of rare photos titled Michael Jackson: Before He Was King.

== External sources ==
- Todd Gray Art
