= Naledi =

Naledi (plural: dinaledi) means "star" in the Sotho-Tswana group of languages. It may refer to:

- Naledi (WASP-62), a star about 573 light-years away, in the constellation Dorado.
- Naledi Local Municipality, Free State, South Africa
- Naledi Local Municipality, North West, South Africa
- Naledi High School, in Soweto, South Africa
- Naledi Theatre Awards
- Naledi Aphiwe, South African singer

== See also ==
- Homo naledi, an extinct species of the genus Homo (humans)
- Naledi Pandor (born 1953), South African Minister of Science and Technology
- Theo Naledi (born 1936), retired Bishop of Botswana
