= Million Makaringe =

South African politician

Million Makaringe MPL

Member of the Mpumalanga Provincial Legislature
- Incumbent
- Assumed office 22 May 2019

Personal details
- Born: Kumani, Bushbuckridge; Mpumalanga, South Africa
- Party: African National Congress

Tutani Million Makaringe is a South African politician who has represented the African National Congress (ANC) in the Mpumalanga Provincial Legislature since 2019. He was elected to his seat in the 2019 general election, ranked 22nd on the ANC's party list. As of May 2022, he was the Deputy Chief Whip in the legislature.

Makaringe was born in Kumana, a village in Bushbuckridge in present-day Mpumalanga province. He was formerly a local councilor in Bushbuckridge Local Municipality, where he was the ANC's Chief whip in the council by 2017.
