= Hector Pieterson Museum =

- Established: 2002; 24 years ago
- Location: Soweto, South Africa
- Coordinates: 26°14.090′S 27°54.517′E
- Type: Specialized museums

The Hector Pieterson Museum is a museum located in Orlando West, Soweto, South Africa. Located two blocks away from where student protester Hector Pieterson was shot and killed on 16 June 1976, the museum is named in his honour and covers the events of the anti-Apartheid Soweto Uprising and Massacre, where more than 170 protesting school children were killed.

The museum features films, newspapers, personal accounts and photographs, the most famous being the iconic photo by Sam Nzima.

The Hector Pieterson Museum became one of the first museums in Soweto when it opened on 16 June 2002. A companion museum nearby is Mandela House, the former home of Nelson Mandela and his family, which has been run as a museum since 1997. The total cost of the Hector Pieterson Museum project was Rand 23.2 million, which was covered by a 16 million rand donation by the Department of Environmental Affairs and Tourism and a 7.2 million rand donation from the Johannesburg City Council.
