= Connie Mofokeng =

South African anti-apartheid activist

Connie Mofokeng (born 1959) is a Black South African woman who was an anti-apartheid activist. Mofokeng was a member of the Soweto Student Representative Council at the time of the Soweto uprising, and she was arrested along with over a hundred others Mofokeng was a founding member and secretary of the Vaal Organisation of Women. In 1984, Mofokeng again marched against apartheid, and was again arrested and imprisoned. Later, she escaped and subsequently lived in exile.

== Early life ==
Mofokeng was born in Johannesburg.

== Education ==
After her three month imprisonment for the Soweto uprising, Mofokeng was expelled from her school. She arranged so that she could still take classes.

== Torture ==
Mofokeng was tortured while imprisoned in an attempt to get information about the Soweto uprising. She was punched and kicked, and the soldiers used electrical torture against her. Her 1984 arrest resulted in her again getting tortured and underfed, this time until she fell unconscious. Mofokeng escaped while en route to the hospital and fled into exile. Once she was able to see a doctor, who determined that she had been given poison that was damaging her intestines, she underwent surgery, and the damage was repaired. She never revealed information. Mofokeng lost hearing in her right ear from the beatings.
