= Brighton Ngoma =

South African actor

- Born: Brighton Ngoma; 1985 (age 40–41); Mpumalanga, South Africa
- Occupation: Actor
- Years active: 2007–present

Brighton Ngoma (born 1985) is a South African actor. He is best known for his roles in the television serials Invictus, Who Am I? and Master Harold...and the Boys.

== Personal life ==
He was born in 1985 in Bushbuckridge, Mpumalanga, South Africa and has a Xhosa and Swiss heritage. His father was a doctor while his mother is a nurse. Ngoma has one younger brother. His father left him at the age of 5, where he raised with his mother. In 2002, when he was 17 years old, his mother died. Afterwards, another family fostered his brother.

Ngoma has a skin condition called Vitiligo, that causes the skin to lose pigmentation, resulting in discoloured patches.

He is married to fellow actress Tshepi Mashego and is a father of one son, Leano, who was born in January 2017.

== Career ==
He started his career as a freelance stage manager. Then he started acting in the popular television serial Scandal as a featured extra. After the director saw his acting ability, Ngoma was soon promoted to a supportive actor. However after a few months, he was promoted to have a leading role of the character 'Quinton Nyathi'. The show became one of the most watched soap operas in South Africa, and it was also broadcast across Africa on the eAfrica, e.tv Botswana and e.tv Ghana.

== Filmography ==
Year	Film	Role	Genre	Ref.
2008–2019	Scandal!	Quinton Nyathi	TV Series	
2021	UBettina Wethu	T-bang	TV Series	
