= Hastings Ndlovu =

South African high school student killed in the Soweto Uprising (1961–1976)

- Born: February 2, 1961; Soweto, Johannesburg, South Africa
- Died: June 16, 1976 (aged 15); Soweto, Johannesburg, South Africa
- Resting place: Avalon Cemetery, Johannesburg
- Known for: First student killed in the Soweto Uprising

Hastings Ndlovu (2 February 1961 – 16 June 1976) was a South African high school student who was killed by the police in the Soweto uprising against the apartheid system in South Africa.

== Death ==
Ndlovu was the first child killed on 16 June 1976 during the Soweto uprising and massacre when Orlando police opened fire on students protesting against the imposition of Afrikaans instruction in their school. His death was not as widely publicised as Hector Pieterson's because no photographer was present to record it. Police commander Colonel Kleingeld said at the Cillié Commission that Ndlovu "was inciting the crowd".

Ndlovu had three sisters and a brother. His sisters left the country soon after 16 June, but returned to Johannesburg a few years later.

== Legacy ==
Ndlovu was buried with Pieterson at Avalon Cemetery in Johannesburg. His house in Soweto had a blue plaque attached to it on 16 June 2012 to commemorate his death.
