= Melville Edelstein =

South African academic (1919–1976)

Melville Leonard Edelstein (1919— 16 June 1976) was a South African academic and social worker who was killed in the Soweto uprising.

Edelstein born to Nachum and Rose Edelstein in King William's Town, now Qonce. His Litvak parents had first travelled to the UK and then Cape Town in 1896 before joining the masses of "boere-Jode" [Afrikaner or farmer Jews] where his parents had settled and Nachum started and ran a successful business. Edelstein was the grandson of Michael Edelstein who established the first synagogue at King William's Town.

== Work ==
Edelstein was a sociologist and academic and had devoted his efforts to humanitarian and social welfare projects in Soweto. Serving as Deputy Chief Welfare Officer, Edelstein instituted many projects aimed at assisting youth, disabled, poor, and marginalized communities within Soweto. A practicing Orthodox Jew, Edelstein was apolitical and a pacifist who refused to enlist for World War II. He served for eighteen years as a social worker for the Welfare Section of the Non-European Affairs Department, which fell under the City of Johannesburg.

== Death ==
Edelstein was one of the two white men who died in the Soweto uprising of 16 June 1976, when he was stoned to death by a crowd of enraged students.

Edelstein had been hosting the official opening for a branch of his Sheltered Workshop Programme in Orlando East, designed to provide employment for disabled people, when news of the student protests reached the project. The ceremony was brought to a hurried end as dignitaries and workers were ferried out of the township. Concerned about the safety of a woman colleague – Pierette Jacques, back at the Youth Centre in Youth Centre in Jabavu – Edelstein drove through crowds of gathering students to get to her office. Edelstein then rushed through the offices, instructing staff to leave immediately.

While there, an angry mob broke into the building and stoned him to death. Reporter Peter Magubane later found his body with a note saying "Beware Afrikaans is the most dangerous drug for our future." Magubane said, "If they'd known who he was, this would never have happened."
