= Eight Days in September =

Account on the removal of South African president Thabo Mbeki in September 2008

Eight Days in September: The Removal of Thabo Mbeki
- Author: Frank Chikane
- Language: English
- Subject: Political memoir
- Genre: Non-fiction
- Publisher: Pan Macmillan South Africa
- Publication date: 2012
- Publication place: South Africa
- Media type: Print (Paperback)
- Pages: 271
- ISBN: 978-1-77010-221-7

Eight Days in September: The Removal of Thabo Mbeki is a political memoir by South Africa author and former civil servant Frank Chikane. Published in 2012 by Pan Macmillan South Africa, the book was presented as an insider's account of the events leading to the removal of President Thabo Mbeki from office in September 2008.

== Content ==
Frank Chikane served as the Director-General in the Office of the President during Mbeki's presidency. In this capacity, he was responsible for managing the transition from Mbeki to Kgalema Motlanthe and subsequently to Jacob Zuma.

The book focuses on the eight-day period, in September 2008, during which Mbeki was removed from office. Chikane describes the internal strife within the African National Congress (ANC), the political maneuvering that led to Mbeki's ousting, and the subsequent transition of power. He also reflects on Mbeki's legacy and the implications of his removal for South Africa's political landscape.

=== The Chikane files ===
Prior to the publication of the book in 2012, Chikane had authored a series of articles known as the "Chikane Files," which were published in The Star newspapers in 2010. The book expands upon these articles. The ANC's secretary-general at the time, Gwede Mantashe, in July 2010, invited readers to be cautious of the files as they were not the "gospel truth".

== Reception ==
"In the final telling, Eight Days feels very inadequate. Chikane comes across as unsaying as much as he says.", wrote Sipho Hlongwane in his review of the book for the Daily Maverick. The Mail & Guardian found Mbeki's portrayal "sycophantic".
