= Mbuyisa Makhubu =

South African anti-Apartheid activist (born 1957)

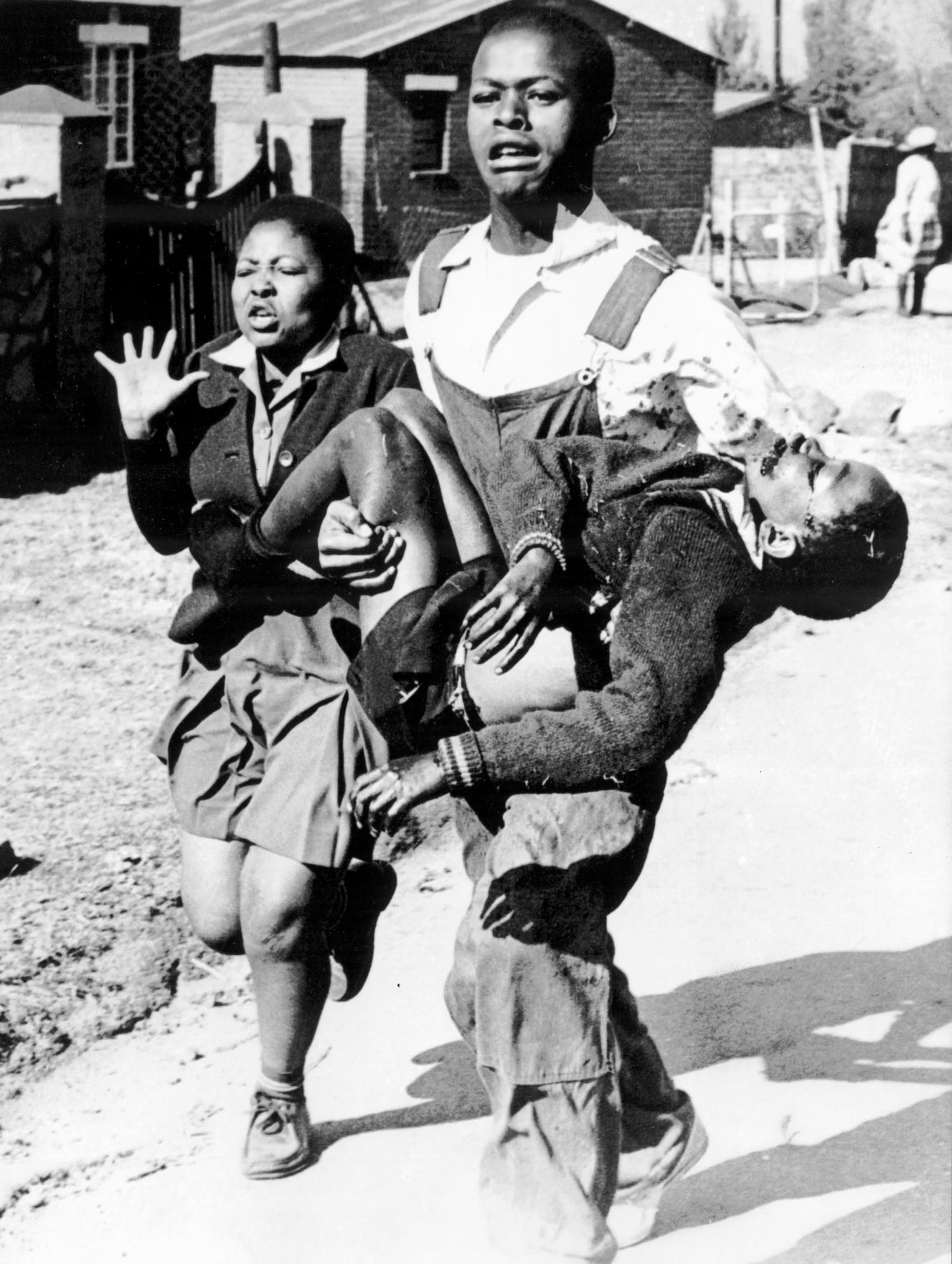
- Makhubu carrying Hector Pieterson, who had been shot by South African police (1976)
- Born: 1957 (age 68–69); Soweto, Johannesburg, South Africa
- Disappeared: 1979 (age 21–22); Nigeria
- Occupations: Student (at time of uprising), anti-apartheid activist
- Years active: 1976–1979
- Known for: Carrying Hector Pieterson during the Soweto uprising; subject of iconic 1976 photograph
- Notable work: Featured in photo by Sam Nzima
- Mother: Nombulelo Makhubu

Mbuyisa Makhubu (born 1957) is a South African anti-apartheid activist who disappeared in 1979. He rose to prominence after he was seen carrying Hector Pieterson in a photograph taken by Sam Nzima after Pieterson was shot during the Soweto Uprising in 1976. Despite the photograph's endurance, little is known about Makhubu.

After the photograph was released, Makhubu was harassed by the security services, and was forced to flee South Africa. His mother, Nombulelo Makhubu, told the Truth and Reconciliation Commission that she received a letter from him from Nigeria in 1978, but that she had not heard from him since. She died in 2004, seemingly without knowledge of what had happened to her son. Mbuyisa was one of a number of South African activists given refuge in Nigeria immediately following the Soweto incident. He was one of three who were settled in a boarding high school in South-Western Nigeria - Federal Government College, during the 1976–1977 academic year. But all failed to settle, and had moved on within the year.

In 2013, claims emerged that a man, Victor Vinnetou, imprisoned in Canada for the previous eight years on immigration charges was Makhubu. Genetic tests were conducted to determine whether he was indeed Mbuyisa Makhubu. It was later reported that the DNA tests did not substantiate the man's claim to be Makhubu, to the disappointment of Makhubu's family, though the DNA test was reported to have been done on a family member without blood relations to both parents.

As of 2020, his whereabouts still remain unknown. The same year, a four-episode documentary titled Through The Cracks, which was released on the 44th anniversary of the uprising on 16 June 2020, provided some previously untold details about Makhubu's life. It was also reported that a heritage plaque commemorating Makhubu would be installed on 16 June 2020, as well.
