= United Nations Security Council Resolution 392 =

UN Security Council Resolution 392
- Location of South Africa
- Date: 19 June 1976
- Meeting no.: 1,930
- Code: S/RES/392 (Document)
- Subject: South Africa
- Result: Adopted

Security Council composition
- Permanent members: China; France; Soviet Union; United Kingdom; United States
- Non-permanent members: Benin; Guyana; Italy; Japan; Libya; Pakistan; Panama; Romania; Sweden; Tanzania

United Nations Security Council Resolution 392 was adopted on June 19, 1976 after the killing of black youths by South African police in Soweto and other areas. The Council strongly condemned the South African government for its measures of repression against the African people, expressing their shock after the "callous shooting" of the protesters and sympathizing with the victims who were demonstrating against the policies of the National Party. The resolution also reaffirmed that "the policy of apartheid is a crime against the conscience and dignity of mankind and seriously disturbs international peace and security" which continued in defiance of Security Council and General Assembly resolutions.

The meeting was called after Benin, Libya, Madagascar, and Tanzania raised the issue in a letter to the Council. No details of the voting were given, other than that the resolution was "adopted by consensus".

Resolution 392, like others before it, reaffirmed the legitimate right of self-determination of the South African people.

== See also ==
- List of United Nations Security Council Resolutions 301 to 400 (1971–1976)
- South Africa under apartheid
- Soweto uprising
