= Nomkhitha Virginia Mashinini =

South African anti-Apartheid activist (b. 1935, d. 2008)

- Born: Nomkhita Virginia Boto; 9 May 1935; Bengu village, Eastern Cape
- Died: September 25, 2008 (aged 73); South Africa
- Education: Mt. Author
- Occupation: Political Activist
- Known for: 1976 Student Uprising
- Spouse: Ramothibi Mashinini
- Children: Mokete Mashinini, Tsietsi Mashinini, Lehlogonolo Mashinini, Mpho Mashinini, Lebakeng Mashinini, Moeketsi Mashinini, Tshepiso Mashinini, Sydney Mashinini, Dichaba Mashinini, Bandile Mashinini, Lindy Mashinini, Linda Mashinini
- Parent(s): Olive Nontuthuzelo Boto, Daniel Boto
- Relatives: Mark Boto

Dichaba Mashinini is 9th son of Ramothibi Joseph and Nomkhitha Virginia MashininiNomkhitha Virginia Mashinini (May 9, 1935 - September 25, 2008) was a South African apartheid detainee, the mother of political figure Tsietsi Mashinini, and a community worker.

== Early life ==
Nomkhitha Virginia Mashinini was born on May 9, 1935, in Bengu, South Africa, a settlement near Lady Frere in the former Transkei. Her father, Daniel Boto, was of royal descent and an Imbongi for the royal court. He had fifteen children from his first marriage. After the death of his first wife, Boto married Olive Nontuthuzelo from the village of St Marks. Nomkhitha was their first child.

Nomkhitha's brother Mark was born a few years later. The two siblings shared a very close bond. Their mother was often away during the weekdays since she worked as a teacher in a village beyond the average commuting distance. Their father was more involved in their upbringing, something which was unusual for most African families at the time.

As a royal praise singer, Boto valued traditional Xhosa customs and instilled those values in Nomkhitha. Many would later trace the rhetorical skills of her son Tsietsi to Boto. Nomkhitha also had a Christian background, owing to her mother's Christian faith. She attended church in Lady Frere every Sunday.

== Education ==
At the age of 13, Nomkhitha was sent to a boarding school for black girls in Mt. Author near Lady Frere, where she studied Biology, Geography, History, English and Arithmetic. Nomkhitha also played tennis, and was generally a very sociable child. She would return home during the Summer & Winter holidays. And her family would visit on their monthly trips to Lady Frere.

Back then, there were only two professions open to black women: teaching and nursing. Nomkhitha decided to study nursing, intending to return to Bengu to practice there.

After completing high school at the age of 17, Nomkhitha moved to Kliptown near Soweto to attend the nursing college in Baragwanath Hospital (now Chris Hani Hospital). While in Kliptown, she stayed with her Aunt Letitia in a two-room rental. Her aunt was unwilling to lose Nomkhitha as a help in the house, so she falsely led her to believe that her applications to various nursing schools were rejected. Years later Nomkhitha would learn that some of the schools had actually accepted her.

== Marriage ==
Nomkhitha met Ramothibi Joseph Mashinini in Kliptown, and they got married in 1955. Ramothibi was a devout Christian man who came from a poor Sotho family in the Free State (province). The wedding took place over two days, with both a Christianceremony in a Presbyterian church in Johannesburg, as well as a traditional wedding where they slaughtered a goat and performed a ceremony more in line with the historical culture of the area.

According to tradition, Nomkhitha stopped speaking isiXhosa out of respect for her mother-in-law, unfortunately she was not fluent in Sotho. A few months after the wedding, she gave birth to her first son, Mokete. Nomkhitha returned to live with Letitia a week prior to the birth, and remained there till a month after Mokete's birth. As was tradition in both Sotho and Xhosa customs.

Over the course of their marriage, they had 13 children: 11 boys & 2 twin girls. Nomkitha did not plan to have a large family but, like many women of the time, Nomkhitha felt powerless in preventing pregnancy as contraceptives were expensive.

== Soweto Uprising ==
In 1976, her sons Tsietsi Mashinini and Mpho Mashinini led the student uprising against Bantu education in Soweto. As a result of the riots that occurred, four of her sons had to flee from the country. One of whom returned and was tried for conspiring to sabotage the government via a military coup.

Due to increased police surveillance, Nomkhitha travelled to Swaziland (since 2018 renamed to Eswatini) in an effort to protect her younger children. Upon her return from Swaziland, she was detained by the South African Police in Standerton on July 1, 1977. Two of her younger sons and Mpho Mashinini were detained on the same day. One of the detained sons, Sydney Mashishi, who was 14 at the time, was tortured and beaten by the police due to his siblings' involvement in the protests.

While in police custody, she was kept under solitary confinement. She was frequently interrogated regarding the whereabouts and political activities of her children. She was released from prison without being charged, having been held for seven months.

She was fired from her job at Guys and Dolls, due to concerns over her influence on other staff members. She struggled to find employment after her detention in 1976. However she later found employment with Meals on Wheels.

== Death ==
Nomkhitha died on September 25, 2008. Former President Kgalema Motlanthe paid his respects to her during his first State of the Nation Address on September 28, 2008.

== See also ==
- 1956 Women's March
- Defiance Campaign
- Florence Matomela
