= Ayana V. Jackson =

American photographer and filmmaker (born 1977)

- Born: May 14, 1977 (age 49); Livingston, New Jersey, United States
- Education: Spelman College
- Known for: Photography; Film
- Notable work: From the Deep: In the Wake of Drexciya
- Website: www.ayanavjackson.com

Ayana V. Jackson (born May 14, 1977) is an American photographer and filmmaker. Born in Livingston, New Jersey. She is best known for her focus on Contemporary Africa and the African Diaspora, most notably the series African by Legacy, Mexican by Birth, Leapfrog (a bit of the Other) Grand Matron Army, and Archival Impulse.

== Biography ==
Ayana Vellissia Jackson was born in Livingston, New Jersey and raised in East Orange, New Jersey where her family has long held residence. Her grandmother Angenetta Still Jackson, is a descendant of Leah Arthur Jones—a member of the founding family of New Jersey's first Black Settlement, Lawnside, New Jersey. Her grandfather, J. Garfield Jackson, was Essex County's first African American principal. The city of East Orange later named Jackson Academy elementary school after him. She traveled to Ghana in 2001, where she visited her family's compound in North Odorkor. During this trip she produced her first photography series, "Full Circle: A Survey of Hip Hop in Ghana."

== Education ==
Jackson initially studied sociology and photography during her undergraduate years at and received her B.A. in Sociology from Spelman College in 1999. In 2005, at the invitation of professor Katharina Sieverding, she studied critical theory and large-format printing at Berlin University of the Arts and continued her training at a series of photography residencies including the Bakery Photographic Collective and Cité Internationale Universitaire de Paris, France.

== Career ==
Her photographic series "Full Circle: A Survey of Hip Hop in Ghana," "Viajes Personales," and "African by Legacy, Mexican by Birth" have been exhibited in association with Gallery MOMO (Johannesburg, RSA), Rush Arts Gallery (US), A Gathering of the Tribes (US), Galerie Peter Herrmann (Germany), Mexican Museum (US) the Franklin H. Williams CCC/African Diaspora Institute (US) and Culturesfrance (FR), the US State Department and the World Bank.

She has received grants from the Inter-American Foundation and Puma Creative; the latter supported her participation in the 2009 Bamako African Photography Biennial (Rencontres africaines de la photographie).

Her public art exhibitions include Round 32 of Project Row Houses (US) in Houston's 3rd ward.

Her photography can be found in publications including the exhibition catalogue for her series "African by Legacy, Mexican by Birth," "Souls: A Critical Journal of Black Politics, Culture, and Society" (Columbia University), Camera Austria, and the New York Times blog called Lens. She has lectured and conducted workshops at university and arts institutions in the US, Colombia. Mexico, Venezuela, and Nicaragua. Ayana V. Jackson got grants from the Marguerite Casey Foundation, Inter American Foundation, US State Department, French Institute and New York Foundation for the Arts (NYFA) Fellowship for photography.

=== Full Circle: A Survey of Hip Hop in Ghana ===
In "Full Circle," Jackson provides a visual documentary of the Ghanaian music scene, showing how Hip Hop has stretched past U.S. boundaries, including into Africa. "Full Circle" addresses the interplay between diasporic and Ghanaian communities and the influence both have on each other.

=== African by Legacy, Mexican by Birth ===
In "African By Legacy, Mexican By Birth," the photographic work of Jackson and the narrative of Marco Villalobos brings insight in addressing the role of racial and cultural citizenship as it impacts the lives of African descendants in Mexico and throughout the Americas. The exhibition references the maroon Yanga of Mexico who fought for the liberation of enslaved people and assured the continuing presence of Afro Mexicans as a part of the African legacy in the Americas. Selections from "African By Legacy, Mexican by Birth" were presented throughout Latin America in venues such as Altos de Chavon, La Romana, Dominican Republic; La Fe Theater, Ciudad Juarez, Mexico; Universidad Autonomia de Nicaragua and the Colsubsidio, Bogota, Colombia.

=== Film ===
Jackson, Ayana V. and Marco Villalobos, Rompiendo el Silencio, 12 minutes Spanish/English subtitles

In collaboration with writer and filmmaker Marco Villalobos, Rompiendo el Silencio is Jackson & Villalobos's ongoing work in sound vision. A meditation on common struggle, a celebration of diversity, and a contemplation on the origins of modern maroonage. Rompiendo el Silencio frames history and urgency in the here and now. This film combines first-person narrative with images captured by Jackson and Villalobos on Super 8. Sound art composed by Marco Villalobos is mixed with interviews conducted during their 2003 and 2005 trips.

== Exhibitions ==
=== Solo ===
Year	Title	Venue	Country
2013	Gallery Sho Contemporary Art	-	Tokyo
2013	Archival Impulse and Poverty Pornography	Baudoin Lebon Gallery	Paris, France
2013	Archival Impulse	MOMO Gallery	Johannesburg, South Africa
2011	Projection surface	MOMO Gallery	Johannesburg, South Africa
2009	African by Legacy, Mexican by Birth	Angkhor Photo Festival	Cambodia
2008	Looking Glass Self	Peter Hermann Gallery	Berlin, Germany
2007	African by Legacy, Mexican by Birth	Mijares Gallery in conjunction with UCLA	Los Angeles, CA
2006	African by Legacy, Mexican by Birth	Guadeloupe Arts Center	San Antonio, Texas
2006	Viajes Personales	Bluefields Indian and Caribbean University	Bluefields, Nicaragua
2005	Instituto Universitario de Barlovento, Higuerote, Venezuela; Biblioteca Virgilio Barco, Bogota Colombia; UNAN-Leon, Leon, Nicaragua; Museo del Hombre, Santo Domingo, Dominican Republic African By Legacy, Mexican by Birth (Series 1)	Inter-America Foundation, National Council of La Raza, Inter-Agency Consultation on Race in Latin America	Washington DC

=== Group ===
Year	Work	Venue	Country
2018	In Their Own Form	Museum of Contemporary Photography	Chicago, IL
2015	"Does the brown paper bag test really exist? Will my father be proud?"	1:54 Contemporary African Art Fair, Mariane Ibrahim Gallery	New York, NY
2010	ECO, SEGAW, ECHO, XIANG	Project Row Houses Round 32	Houston, Texas
2010	The Mothership has Landed	Rush Arts	New York, NY
2009	8th Bamako Encounters / African Photography Biennial	-	Bamako, Mali
2008	The Shoot Out: A Lonely Crusade, Homage to Jamel Shabazz	The George and Leah McKenna Museum of African American Art	New Orleans, LA
2007	Post Millennial Black Madonna Paradise/ Inferno	Museum of Contemporary African Diasporic Art (MoCADA) and Skylight Gallery	Brooklyn, NY
2006	The Shoot Out	African American Museum	Philadelphia, PA
2003	Full Circle: A Survey Of Hip Hop in Ghana	The World bank	DC
