= Sam Nzima =

South African photographer (1934–2018)

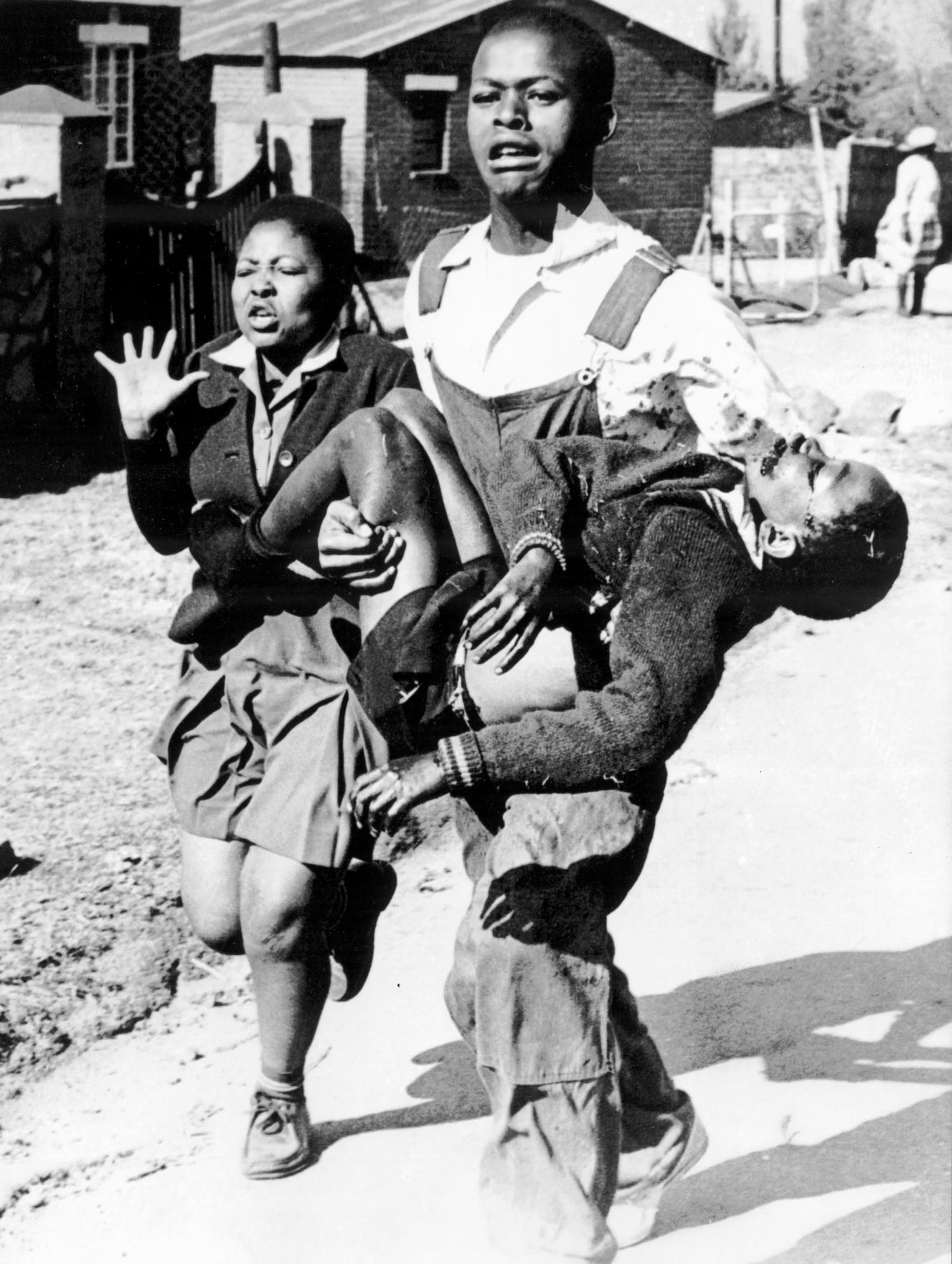
Hector Pieterson being carried by Mbuyisa Makhubo after being shot by South African police. His sister, Antoinette Sithole runs beside them.

Sam Nzima (8 August 1934 in Lillydale, Bushbuckridge Local Municipality – 12 May 2018 in Nelspruit) was a South African photographer who took what became the widely-circulated and influential image of Hector Pieterson for the Soweto uprising, but struggled for years to get the copyright.

== Early life ==
Sam Masana Nzima was born in the village of Lillydale in Transvaal Province (now Mpumalanga). His father worked as a labourer for a white farmer. Sam Nzima first became interested in photography when his teacher showed him his camera and how to use it. While still at school, Sam bought a camera and began taking pictures in the Kruger National Park. When the farmer pressed Nzima into farm labour, he fled to Johannesburg after nine months of working on the farm. He found a job as a gardener in Henningham. While working there he completed his high school education.

== Career ==
In 1956, Nzima found work as a waiter at the Savoy Hotel. At the hotel a photographer named Patrick Rikotso taught him photography skills. Nzima took portraits of workers. While at the Chelsea Hotel, Nzima started reading The Rand Daily Mail newspaper. When reading the articles of Allister Sparks Sam became very interested in photojournalism.

While travelling he wrote a story about taking the bus and sent it with photographs to The World, a Black African daily newspaper. The editor of The World was interested in Sam Nzima's work and requested that he work freelance for the paper. Then, in 1968, he invited him to join as a full-time photojournalist.

On 16 June 1976, the Soweto uprising began as police confronted protesting students. Nzima took the photograph of fatally wounded Hector Pieterson (12) on the corner of Moema and Vilakazi Streets in Orlando West, Soweto, near Phefeni High School. This image depicts an emotional scene of Hector being carried by Mbuyisa Makhubo, with Hector's sister Antoinette Pieterson (17) right beside them. After The World published the photo the next day, Nzima was forced to hide because of the harassment he was receiving by the security police. He moved back to Lillydale, where he was kept under surveillance by security police.

When The World was closed down by the government in 1978, the Daily Mail and The Star newspapers requested that Nzima work for them; Nzima refused in fear of the security police killing him.

== Post-journalism career ==
In 1979, Chief Minister Hudson Ntsanwisi of the Gazankulu bantustan made Nzima a member of the legislative assembly.

Nzima faced many years of torment while trying to publish the most famous of his pictures, the Pieterson image. Until his demise, he lived in Lillydale, where he managed a photography school. He served on the councils of the Lillydale municipality and of the Bohlabela District.

== Legacy ==
Nzima would obtain the copyright to his photograph, after many years of trying, when the Argus Newspaper Group, that owned The World, was sold to the Independent Group. Time Magazine regards Nzima's famous image as one of 100 influential images of all time.
