= Mary Sibande =

South African artist

- Born: 1982 (age 43–44); Barberton, South Africa
- Education: Diploma in Fine Arts from Technikon Witwatersrand, University of Johannesburg
- Known for: Sculpture; Photography; Visual art Collage
- Awards: 54th Venice Biennale artist

Mary Sibande (born 1982) is a South African artist based in Johannesburg. Her art consists of sculptures, paintings, photography, and design. Sibande uses these mediums and techniques to help depict the human form and explore the construction of identity in a postcolonial South African context. In addition, Sibande focuses on using her work to show her personal experiences while living through Apartheid. Her art also attempts to critique stereotypical depictions of women, particularly Black women.

== Early life ==
Sibande was born in Barberton in apartheid South Africa and was raised by her grandmother. Her mother was a domestic worker herself, and her father was in the South African Army. She did not know her father when she was younger but got to know him when she was a teenager. She often pays homage to domestic workers in her art and seeks to "give [them] voice," influenced by her mother's experience as a domestic worker. Sibande has described her childhood as being perfect; she states that "‘I had everything I needed, and I went to a good high school which was multiracial. Many families couldn't afford to send their kids there but I was fortunate that my mum was able to. I guess that also pushed me in a certain direction."

== Education ==
Sibande received her diploma in Fine Arts from the Technikon Witwatersrand in 2004. She obtained a B-tech degree from the University of Johannesburg in 2007. At first, Sibande wanted to be a fashion designer and art was more of an afterthought. Her aspirations of being a fashion designer are still prominent throughout all of her works. The influence of fashion and design are prominent and discernible throughout her portfolio of art. In 2001, Sibande moved in with her mother in Johannesburg where she was studied at Technikon Witwatersrand.

== Career and work ==
Sibande has used her work to expose many different things, from postcolonial South Africa to stereotypes of women; she also addresses intersectional issues such as stereotypes regarding Black women in South Africa. Her work contains multiple types of mediums such as sculpture, photography, design, collage, and even theatrics. Sibande's painting and sculpture uses the human form to explore the construction of identity in a postcolonial South African context, but also attempts to critique stereotypical depictions of women, particularly Black women. She was the South African representative at the 45th 2011 Venice Biennale, and her work Long Live the Dead Queen was found in murals all over the city of Johannesburg in 2010. In 2016, her work The Purple Shall Govern toured South Africa. Sibande has also used her artwork to focus on giving voiceless people their voice back. Some have even said that her work confronts the very inkling of a disempowered African female and that her work aims to crack the morse code associated with western ideals of beauty and how they can appeal to Black women.

=== Design ===
Sibande has stated that "fashion and fine art aren't far off from each other," and that she seeks to "marry the two worlds" through her work. Sibande was initially determined to be a fashion designer and said, "There were no museums and galleries in the town I grew up in; that was foreign to me." Sibande has incorporated her knowledge and love for design into her works, especially visible in the wardrobe pieces her sculptures wear. In her "Conversation with Madam CJ Walker" exhibit, her knowledge and skill of cloth and fashion design are apparent. The fabrics and color Sibande chooses to use have different meaning and impacts on her work. In a journal article for the UNISA and Durban Art Gallery article an author named Carol Brown spoke about the usage of fabric in Sibande's work. She states that "The fabric used to produce uniforms for domestic workers is an instantly recognizable sight in domestic spaces in South Africa, and by applying it to Victorian dress she attempts to make a comment about history of servitude and colonization as it relates to the present in terms of domestic relationships."

=== Photography ===
Sibande has used photography to capture and construct her artworks. In 2013, she had seven enlarged photographs of her work displayed on the streets of French suburbs such as Ivry-sur-Seine, Vitry-sur-Seine and Choisy-le-Roi. Photography has played a role in both her large, public displays and in her smaller-scale, day-to-day work. Sibande takes into consideration how her work will be photographed which is reflected in how she presents and structures her works and installations. Many of her shows include both a display of her sculptures as well as photographs she's taken of her work or installations.

=== Sculpture ===
Early in her career Sibande only made small figures out of clay. Later on, the impact of Sibande's background in and knowledge of sculpture became a greater one. With exhibits such as her "Long Live the Dead Queen Series" in 2013, one is able to see the beginning of her character "Sophie" who is one of her best known and reappearing character in her sculptures. Sophie, the main feature in all of her works is a sculpture. Sophie is molded after Sibande herself and is like her alter-ego. Sibande's sculpture draws energy from the long history of female domestic workers, during the apartheid and post-apartheid. The sculpture, Sophie, attempts to critique the long history of oppression in South Africa, specifically regarding black women in South Africa.

=== Theatrics ===
Sibande's work is well known for both her whimsy and theatrics. The theatrics of her work plays a big role in how she showcases and portrays her characters as well as her messages. In an article by Leora Farber the author makes an analysis that many other critiques have said, "Sibande's theatrical quotations of the language of dress and use of dramatic poses may be related to photographic representations of the Victorian female hysteric in various stages of a hysterical attack, in that they both evoke a sense of excess." The use Sibande has for positioning her sculpture, in addition to all of the other components of her work are to evoke an impression on the viewer.

== Sophie ==
Sophie has played a large role in Sibande's work. Sophie as previously mentioned is Sibande's alter-ego, she is a domestic worker who finds peace and an escape from servitude by dreaming of emancipating herself. The character is in an imaginary and dream-like world where she is finally free. Sophie's life is collected and presented through a series of human-scale sculptures, molded on Sibande herself. Sophie's working uniform is gradually transformed into the grand Victorian wear of the European elite. Placing Sophie in Victorian clothing comments on the restriction of women in these large, heavy and tightened-up dresses. Her dress is a protest against being a maid, and at the same time, it is the façade that allows her fantasies to come to life. Sophie starts to take different roles throughout Sibande's work in addition to being different types of people. In each work Sophie portrays different personas, one being a Victorian queen, another being a general who leads an entire army to victory, she's also a beautiful woman going to a ball and even a pope at one point. Sophie is portrayed as a hero and a character full of strength and perseverance.

Furthermore, Sibande takes Sophie into different exhibits throughout the years. She first portrays Sophie in her “Long Live the Dead Queen” exhibition from 2009 to 2013. "Long Live the Dead Queen" portray Sophie as a maid who is reclaiming who she post-colonialism. She is then brought back again in a different setting in “The Purple Shall Govern” in 2013–2017. This exhibit is when Sibande allows the "new" Sophie to come out and express herself. The exhibit takes a place of an installation which takes over the space. Sophie makes a reappearance with Sibande's most current series, “I Came Apart at the Seams” which takes place from 2019 to the present. Sophie is also depicted in a sculpture called Sophie/Elsie, which Sibande created in honor of her great-grandmother (a domestic worker whose masters gave her "Elsie" as a Western name).

== Collections ==
Sibande's work is held in the following permanent collections:

- University of Michigan Museum of Art, Ann Arbor, MI
- Toledo Museum of Art, Toledo, OH
- Spencer Museum of Art, Lawrence, KS
- National Museum of African Art, Washington, DC

== Exhibitions ==
=== Solo exhibitions ===
- Long Live The Dead Queen, Inner City Johannesburg; Joburg City World Premier Annual Exhibition, Johannesburg; National Arts Festival, Grahamstown, South Africa, 2010
- Mary Sibande and Sophie Ntombikayise Take Central Court, Central Court, Spencer Museum of Art, University of Kansas, Kansas, USA, 2012
- The Purple Shall Govern, Musée d'Art Contemporain du Val-de-Marne, Paris, 2013
- The Purple Shall Govern, Grahamstown National Arts Festival, Grahamstown, South Africa, 2013
- Lyon Biennale of Contemporary Art, The Museum of Contemporary Art, Lyon, France, 2013
- The Purple Shall Govern, Iziko South African National Gallery, Cape Town; Standard Bank Gallery, Johannesburg, South Africa, 2014
- Right Now!, Stellenbosch University's Woordfees Festival, Stellenbosch University's Art Museum, Stellenbosch, South Africa, 2016
- I came apart at the seams, Somerset House, London, 2019
- Mary Sibande: Blue Purple Red, Frist Art Museum, Nashville, Tennessee
- Sophie/Elsie, University of Michigan Museum of Art, Ann Arbor, Michigan, USA, 2021

=== Group exhibitions ===
- Re(as)sisting Narratives, Framer Framed, The Netherlands, 2016
- Different Angels, Höhenrausch Linz, Austria, 2017
- Beauty and Its Beasts, Durban Art Gallery, Durban, South Africa, 2017
- Another Antipodes/Urban Axis, PS Art Space, Fremantle, Australia, 2017
- The Evidence of Things Not Seen, Johannesburg Art Gallery (JAG), Johannesburg, South Africa, 2017
- 1:54 Contemporary African Art Fair, Somerset House, London, 2017
- Dress Code, Gallery MOMO, Cape Town, South Africa, 2017
- All things being equal, Zeitz Museum of Contemporary Art Africa (MOCAA), Cape Town, South Africa, 2017
- South Africa: The Art of a Nation, The British Museum, London, 2017
- African Mosaic: Selections from the Permanent Collection, National Museum of African Art, Smithsonian Institution, Washington, D.C, USA, 2017
- Friends50, Iziko South African National Gallery, Cape Town, South Africa, 2018
- Cultural Threads, TextielMuseum, Tilburg, Netherlands, 2018
- Like Life: Sculpture, Color, and the Body (1300–Now), The Met Breuer, New York City, USA, 2018
- Continental Drift: Black / black Art from South Africa and North Australia, Cairns Art Gallery, Cairns, Australia, 2018
- Not a Single Story, Nirox Foundation Sculpture Park, Krugersdorp, South Africa, 2018
- Shifting Boundaries: A Selection of Works showcasing South African Women Artists of the Past 100 Years, Welgemeend, Cape Town, South Africa, 2018
- In Their Own Form, Museum of Contemporary Photography(MoCP), Chicago, USA, 2018
- The Armory Show, Piers 92 & 94, New York City, USA, 2018
- Extra/Ordinary, Plugin New Media Section, Contemporary Istanbul, Istanbul, Turkey, 2018
- A New Humanity, Dak'Art: African Contemporary Art Biennale, Dakar, Senegal, 2018
- Made Visible, Contemporary South African Fashion and Identity, Boston Museum of Fine Art, Boston, USA, 2019
- Construction of the Possible, Havana Biennale, Havana, Cuba, 2019
- Ampersand Foundation Award 21 years celebration exhibition, University of Johannesburg Art Gallery (JAG), Johannesburg, South Africa, 2019
- FNB Art Joburg (SMAC Gallery), Sandton Convention Centre, Johannesburg, South Africa, 2019
- N'GOLÁ Festival of Arts, Creation, Environment and Utopias, São Tomé e Príncipe, 2019
- 14th Curitiba International Biennale of Contemporary Art, Curitiba, Brazil, 2019
- 1-54 Contemporary African Art Fair (SMAC Gallery), Somerset House, London, 2019
- Radical Revisionists: Contemporary African Artists Confronting Past and Present, Moody Center for the Arts, Houston, Texas, 2020
- Narratives in Focus: Selections from PAMM's Collection, Pérez Art Museum Miami, Florida, 2025

== Awards and distinctions ==
- 2017: Smithsonian National Museum of African Arts Award
- 2014: Johannesburg Alumni Dignitas Award
- 2013: Standard Bank Young Artist Award

She has also been a Smithsonian Fellow in Washington DC, a Ampersand Foundation Fellow in New York, and a Fellowship in the University of Michigan Fellowship. In 2018–19, Sibande was the Virginia C. Gildersleeve Professor at Barnard College.
