= Gallery MOMO =

- Location within Johannesburg
- Established: 2002
- Location: 52, 7th Avenue Parktown North, Johannesburg
- Coordinates: 26.145102°S 28.031043°E
- Type: Art Gallery
- Website: www.gallerymomo.com

Gallery MOMO is a South African contemporary art gallery, which represents South African and international artists at its exhibition spaces in Johannesburg and Cape Town.

== History ==
Gallery MOMO was founded in Johannesburg in 2002 by the South African art dealer and collector, Monna Mokoena. In 2015, the organization opened a second branch in Cape Town.

Writing in 'Art and the Global Economy', Kai Lossgott identified Gallery MOMO as still in 2017, 'South Africa's only black-owned gallery' and recounted that it had 'paved the way for South Africa's return to the Venice Biennial'. In 2018, Ishani Chetty, writing for the lifestyle and listings magazine 'CapeTown Etc.' ranked Gallery MOMO as one of the city's top five 'must visit' art venues.

== Exhibitions ==
Since its founding, Gallery MOMO has established an extensive programme of showcasing new work in solo and group exhibitions by South African and international artists. According to the Irish Times, by 2006 the Johannesburg venue had already 'earned a reputation for discovering new African and international talent'. Amongst the gallery's earliest events were the 2003 exhibition 'The Age of Enlightenment' by the South African painter, Johannes Phokela. In the 2010s, the gallery continued to host exhibitions by artists such as the South African sculptor, Mary Sibande, the German-based painter, Ransome Stanley and U.S.-born photographer Ayana V. Jackson. The gallery also participates in international art fairs, including the Joburg Art Fair, the Cape Town Art Fair and the Start Art Fair in London.

== Represented artists ==
- Mary Sibande
- Kimathi Donkor
