= Morris Isaacson High School =

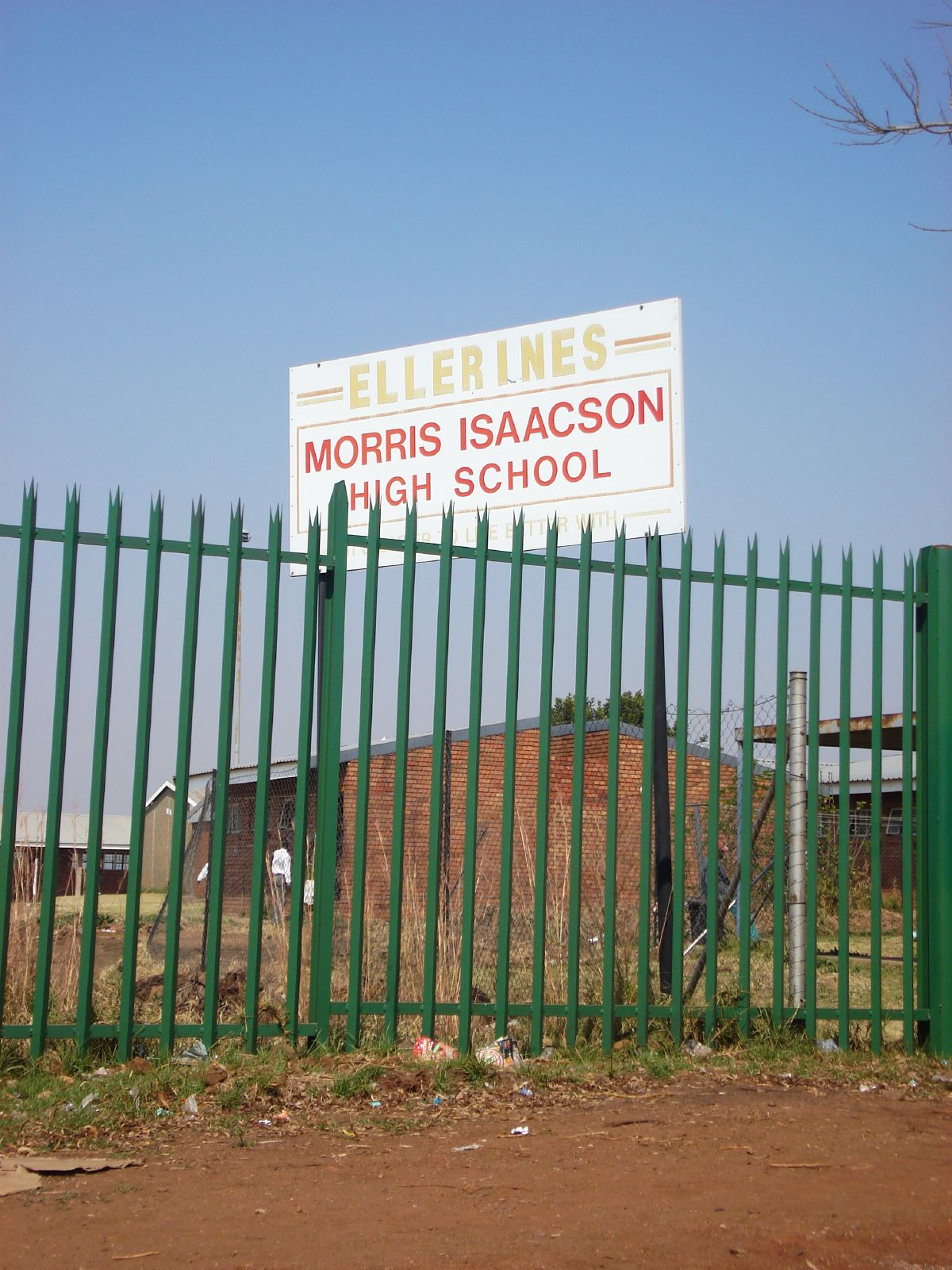

Location
- Coordinates: 26.2455°S 27.8722°E

Information
- Type: Government
- Established: 1956
- Colours: Blue and white

Morris Isaacson High School is a government secondary school in Soweto. Founded in 1956, the school took an important role at the start of the Soweto Uprising in 1976.

== History ==
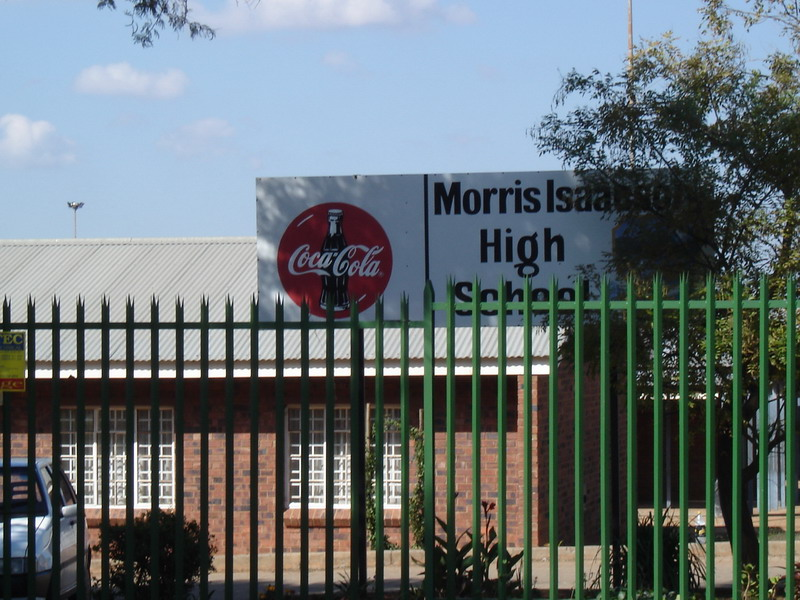
Morris Isaacson High School sign sponsored by Coca-Cola

The school was named for Morris Isaacson, who was a Lithuanian Jewish immigrant in 1896. He had become wealthy by trading, and he set up a fund for black students to complete their education to university level. Isaacson funded this school. He gave enough money to build a school with ten classrooms. It opened in 1956 with 300 pupils, then named "Mohloding School".

During the height of apartheid, teachers at Morris Isaacson High School managed to provide good education, despite the limits of the underfunded Bantu Education system.

On 8 June 1976, the South African Police attempted to arrest Enos Ngutshane at Naledi High School. He was the local leader of the South African Students' Movement. He had sent a letter to the government about the imposition of Afrikaans as the language to be used in schools. The police failed to apprehend him, and the police were stoned and a Volkswagen Beetle was set on fire by the students.

On 16 June, students gathered at Naledi High School to walk to Morris Isaacson High School in Jabavu. Tsietsi Mashinini, a student at this school, was a leader of the march of protest. The plan was to gather at Orlando Stadium, but before that the police arrived and school children were shot.

Because of the prominent role that students played in the Soweto Uprising, Morris Isaacson High School was forced to remain shut from June 1976 until 1979. When it reopened, it managed to survive the turbulent decade of the 1980s. In 1991, a fire destroyed large portions of the school, including the administration block and damaged the library, some classes and the laboratory.

In 1992, the film Sarafina! was filmed at Morris Isaacson High School. The school was chosen partly because of its association with student activism.

On 1 May 1993, Nelson Mandela visited the school to celebrate its role in the Soweto Uprising and the nation's transformation.

By 1995 the school had 36 classrooms, 1100 students, and 34 teachers.

== Alumni ==
- Reneilwe Letsholonyane – footballer
- Teboho MacDonald Mashinini – student leader in 1976
- Kagiso Pat Mautloa – artist
- Paul Trewhela – writer

== Legacy ==
There is a statue of Teboho Mashinini by Johannes Phokela on the grounds that was unveiled on 1 May 2010 by the mayor of Johannesburg.

Morris Isaacson High School has become a center of Youth Day commemorations of the 1976 Soweto Uprising.
