= Avalon Cemetery =

Cemetery in South Africa

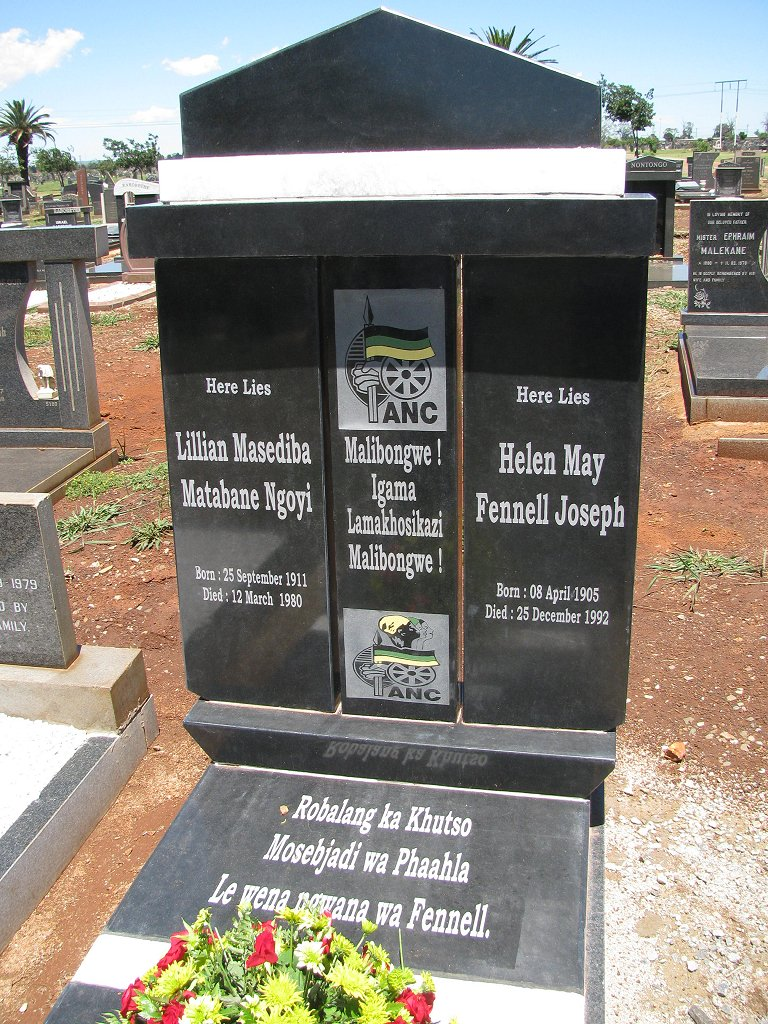
- Famous graves of members of the African National Congress during the apartheid-era
- Interactive map of Avalon Cemetery

Details
- Location: Soweto, Johannesburg
- Country: South Africa
- Coordinates: 26°17′47″S 27°51′44″E

Avalon Cemetery is one of the largest graveyards in South Africa. It was opened in 1972, during the height of apartheid, as a graveyard exclusively for black people. The huge extension was officially opened on 9 February by Matshidiso Mfikoe, at the time a mayoral committee member for environment and corporate services. Before Avalon opened, Sowetans were buried in Nancefield (Klipspruit) Cemetery. That burial ground opened in 1912 but is now full except for second or third burials.

Just beyond the entrance, to the left, there are Memorials dedicated to struggle activists Lilian Ngoyi and Helen Joseph. During Women’s Month in August 2010, the graves of Ngoyi, Joseph and Maxeke were declared National Heritage Sites. (The cemetery has memorials to other heroes as well.)

To the North, near the Train Station, lies the Mendi Memorial. In the cemetery are the graves of Joe Slovo and Hector Pieterson.

The cemetery that inters people from Lenasia, Soweto and surrounding areas reached capacity on 21 October 2022.

== Culture ==
The standard for large funerals in black South African culture was set in the 1970s and 1980s, during the height of the anti-apartheid struggle. Thousands of students boycotted school, adopted the slogan "liberation before education" and took to the streets in protest. They inevitably clashed with police, and the death toll grew each week. The funerals for the victims became one of the most powerful expressions of defiance against the apartheid government. More than 10,000 people, some dressed in military fatigues and armed with wooden rifles, would flock to a cemetery to demonstrate their solidarity in the struggle. When there were not enough buses to drive them to the cemetery, the protesters stopped motorists and forced the drivers to give them a lift. By the end of the day, the funerals often generated new victims of the struggle to be buried the next week.

== Famous burials ==
Avalon Cemetery is noted for a number of famous people interred on its grounds.
Notables include: Hector Pieterson, Hastings Ndlovu, Joe Slovo, Laloo Chiba, Lilian Ngoyi, Helen Joseph, Zephania Mothopeng, Abu Baker Asvat, and Tsietsi Mashinini.
