= Frank Chikane =

South African activist and cleric (born 1951)

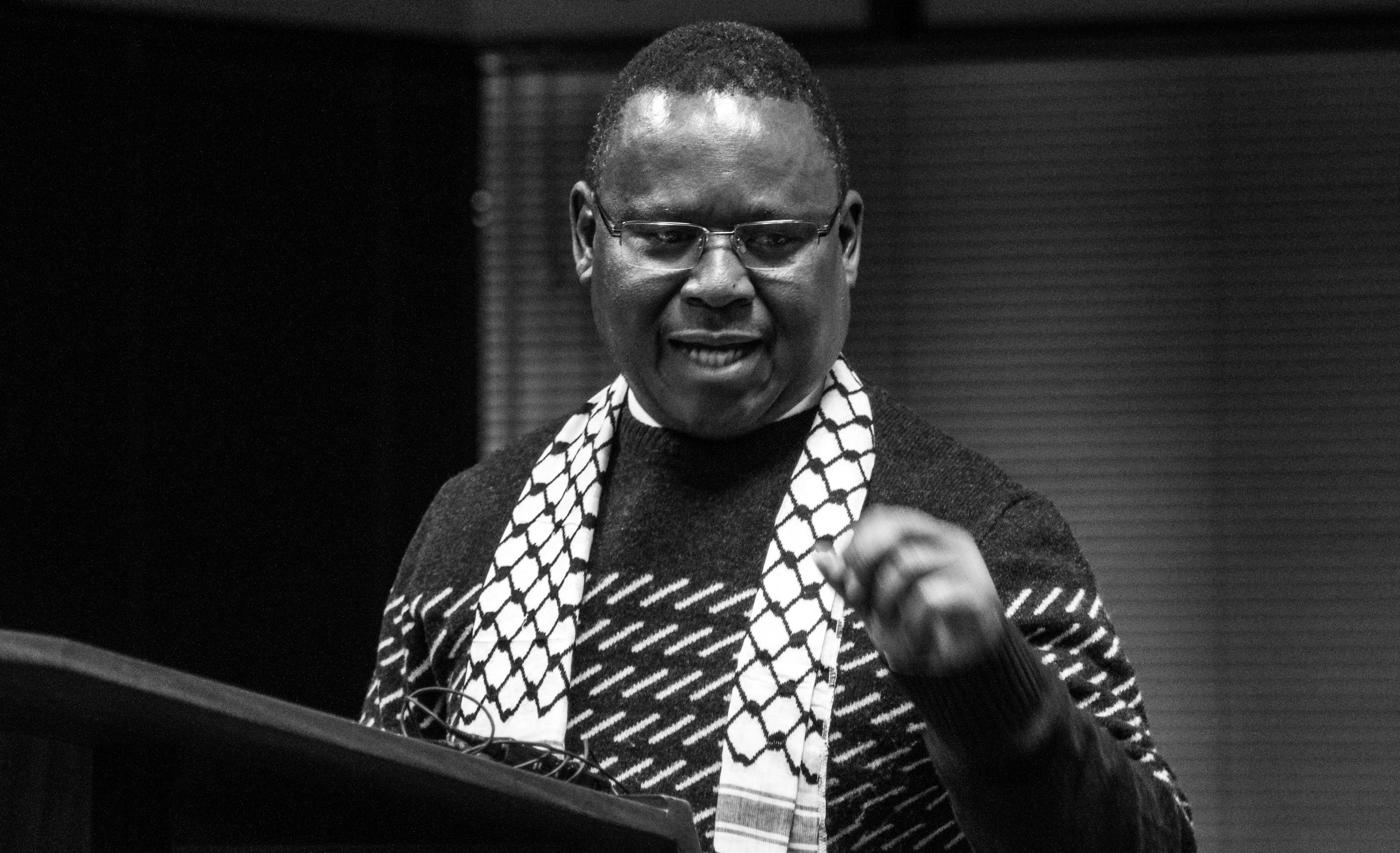
- Frank Chikane 2014
- Born: 3 January 1951 (age 75); Bushbuckridge, Transvaal, South Africa
- Education: Naledi High School; University of the North; Harvard Kennedy School
- Occupations: Civil servant; Writer; Cleric
- Political party: African National Congress
- Spouse: Kagiso Chikane (m. 1980)
- Children: Obakeng Chikane; Otlile Chikane; Rekgotsofetse Chikane

Frank Chikane (born 3 January 1951 in Bushbuckridge, Transvaal) is a South African civil servant, writer and cleric. He is a member of the African National Congress and moderator of the Commission of the Churches on International Affairs for the World Council of Churches.

== Early life and education ==
Chikane was born to James and Erenia Chikane and he grew up in Soweto attending Naledi High School. As the son of a preacher in the Apostolic Faith Mission of South Africa (AFM), a South African Pentecostal church, Chikane was able to receive an education. After finishing high school, Chikane attended the University of the North to study sciences in hopes of becoming a physician. While at the university, Chikane became involved in the Black Consciousness Movement, also known as the Steve Bantu Biko movement, and met Cyril Ramaphosa, who went on to become a post-apartheid South African President, and others.

Chikane led protests at the university against apartheid, which resulted in his leaving the university without a degree in 1975.

== Career ==
In early 1977, while working in the AFM as a layman, he was detained for a month under the Terrorism Act No 83 of 1967 but was eventually released after a judge dismissed his case. Chikane was eventually ordained by the church in 1980, when he began advocating social programs such as a soup kitchen and adult education within the church for its primarily African population.

For these actions, Chikane was suspended from the conservative minded AFM in 1981, which would last until his reinstatement in 1990. After suspension from the AFM, Chikane joined the Institute for Contextual Theology, a Christian think-tank inside the South African Council of Churches (SACC), which promoted liberation Theology; he became general secretary of SACC in 1987. On 20 August 1983 the United Democratic Front was launched in the community hall in Rocklands, near Cape Town. After a conference of delegates from 565 organisations (400 were already members), a public rally was held, attended by about 10,000 people. Chikane, who was the first major speaker, called the day "a turning point in the struggle for freedom". In 1985, Chikane was one of the leading promoters of the Kairos Document, a leading Christian denunciation of apartheid.

In late 1989, agents of the apartheid government attempted to assassinate Chikane by lacing his underwear with Paraoxon. Two of the suspects were former Police Minister Adriaan Vlok and his then-police chief Johan van der Merwe. Each of them received suspended 10-year prison sentences. Vlok sought forgiveness from Rev. Chikane in 2006 by washing his feet.

From 1987 to 1994, Chikane was secretary general of the SACC. In 1995, he earned a master of public administration from the Harvard Kennedy School. From 1997 on, Chikane has been a member of the African National Congress' National Executive Committee. Since 1999, Chikane has been the Director General of the presidency of South Africa under Thabo Mbeki. He was also a consulting advisor for Presidents Kgalema Motlanthe and Jacob Zuma. He is currently the President of AFM International, an international religious body formed to promote the image of the Apostolic Faith Mission worldwide and to coordinate fellowship between AFM national churches in all countries.

In July 2010, Chikane published a series of eight articles which served as a memoir of his time in government and detailed what happened behind the scenes within the ANC and government during the removal of Thabo Mbeki as South African President in September 2008 and the shaky transition that followed. The articles appeared in several Independent newspapers and were dubbed "The Chikane Files". In March 2012, Chikane's book Eight Days in September: The Removal of Thabo Mbeki was published along the same theme, as well as exploring Mbeki's legacy.

== Books ==
- Chikane, Frank (1988). No Life of My Own. Johannesburg: Skotaville Publishers. ISBN 9780947009519.
- Chikane, Frank (2011). Eight Days in September: The Removal of Thabo Mbeki. Johannesburg: Picador Africa. ISBN 978-1-77010-121-0.
- Chikane, Frank (2013). The Things that Could Not be Said. Johannesburg: Picador Africa. ISBN 978-1-77010-225-5.
