= Lilydale, Nova Scotia =

Community in Nova Scotia, Canada

Coordinates: 44°23′58.22″N 64°21′6.03″W

Lilydale is a small rural community outside of Lunenburg, Nova Scotia. It is located about Steverman Lake or what is commonly referred to as Lilydale Lake or Lilydale Pond. There are several farms and businesses existing in the area such as Merlyn Corkum's Auto Body & Towing and The Write Stuff Sign and Design. Contrary to popular belief Lilydale, Nova Scotia has no connection to the notable Canadian poultry brand Lilydale.

The RCMP Detachment for the town of Lunenburg, Nova Scotia is located in Lilydale.
