= Orlando, Soweto =

Orlando
- Interactive map of Orlando
- Location within Gauteng Location within South Africa
- Coordinates: 26.241°S 27.917°E
- Country: South Africa
- Province: Gauteng
- Municipality: City of Johannesburg
- Main Place: Soweto

Area
  - Total: 10.01 km^{2} (3.86 sq mi)

Population (2011)
  - Total: 108,813
  - Density: 10,870/km^{2} (28,150/sq mi)
- Time zone: UTC+2 (SAST)
- PO box: 3680

Orlando is a township in the urban area of Soweto, South Africa. The township was founded in 1931 and named after Edwin Orlando Leake, mayor of Johannesburg from 1925 to 1926. It is divided in two main areas: Orlando West and Orlando East.

== History ==
The township of Orlando was directly involved in some of the most important events of the fight against the apartheid system. Some of the most dramatic clashes between the South African police and anti-apartheid demonstrators occurred in Orlando West. This includes the Soweto uprising where 12-year-old Hector Pieterson was killed. The Hector Pieterson Memorial Museum was established in Orlando West to commemorate those events. In the surroundings of the museum is the house where Nelson Mandela lived for several years while practicing law; the house now hosts the Mandela Family Museum. South African struggle activist and politician Winnie Madikizela-Mandela resided in Soweto during the apartheid era until her death on 2 April 2018.

Orlando Stadium is the home of the soccer team Orlando Pirates of the South African Premier Division.

Orlando East Public Library is the oldest public library in Soweto, dating to at least 1950.

== Gallery ==
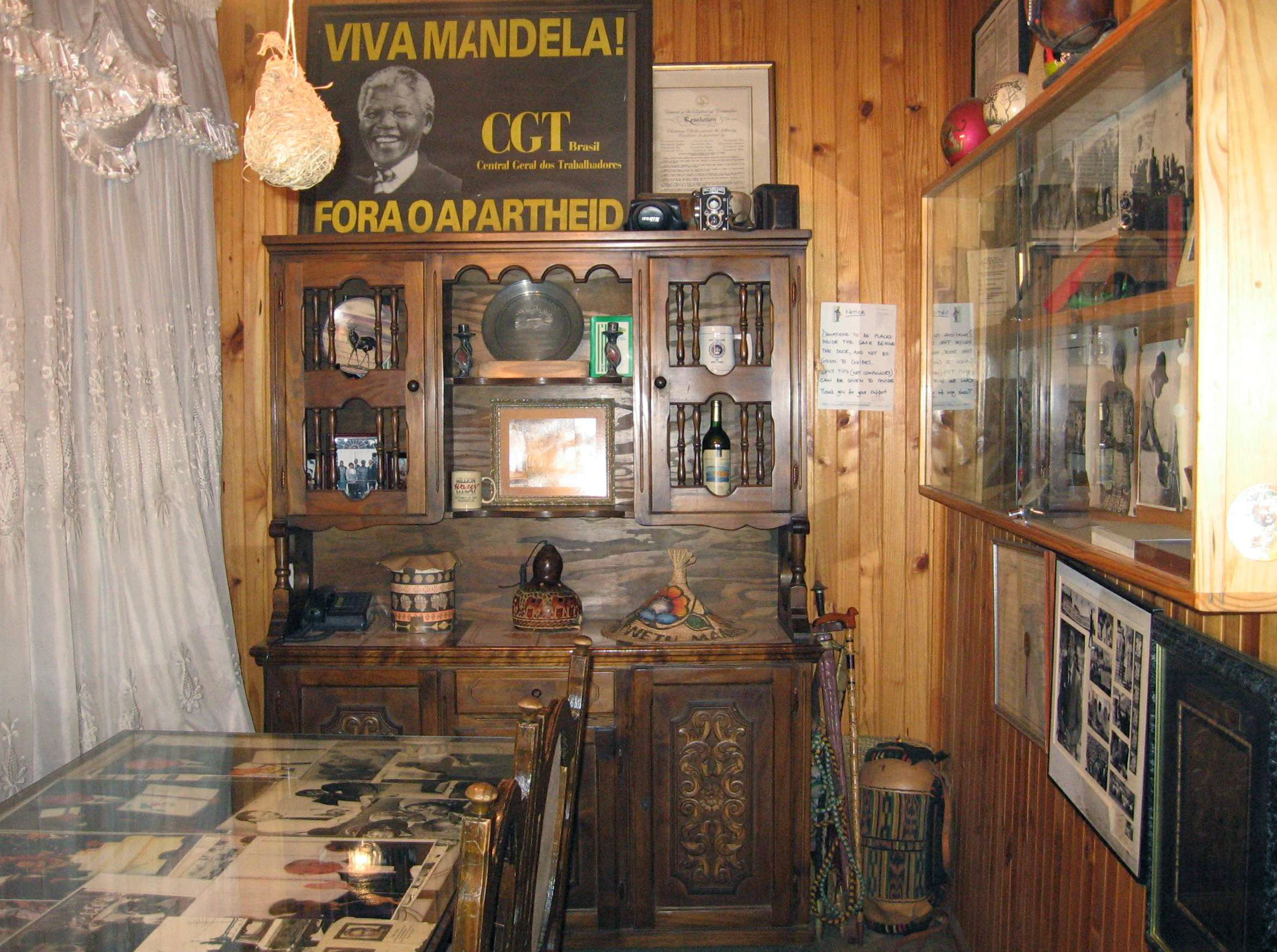
Mandela Family Museum (Orlando West)

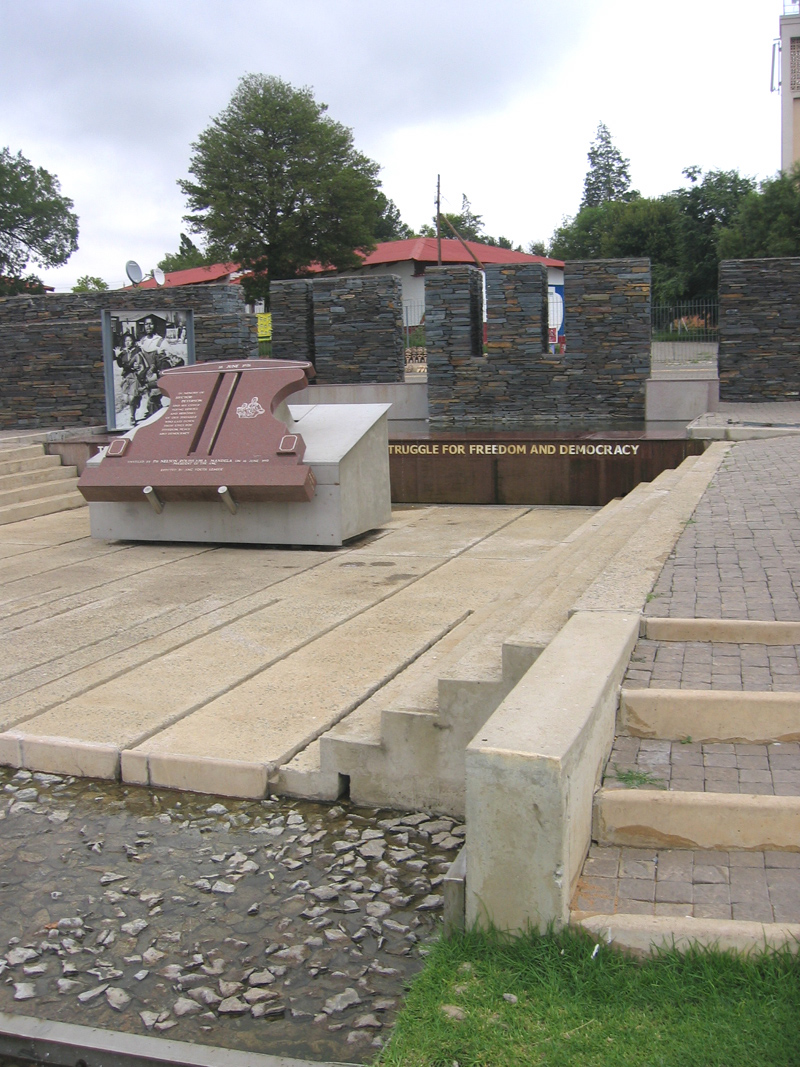
Hector Pieterson Memorial and Museum (Orlando West)

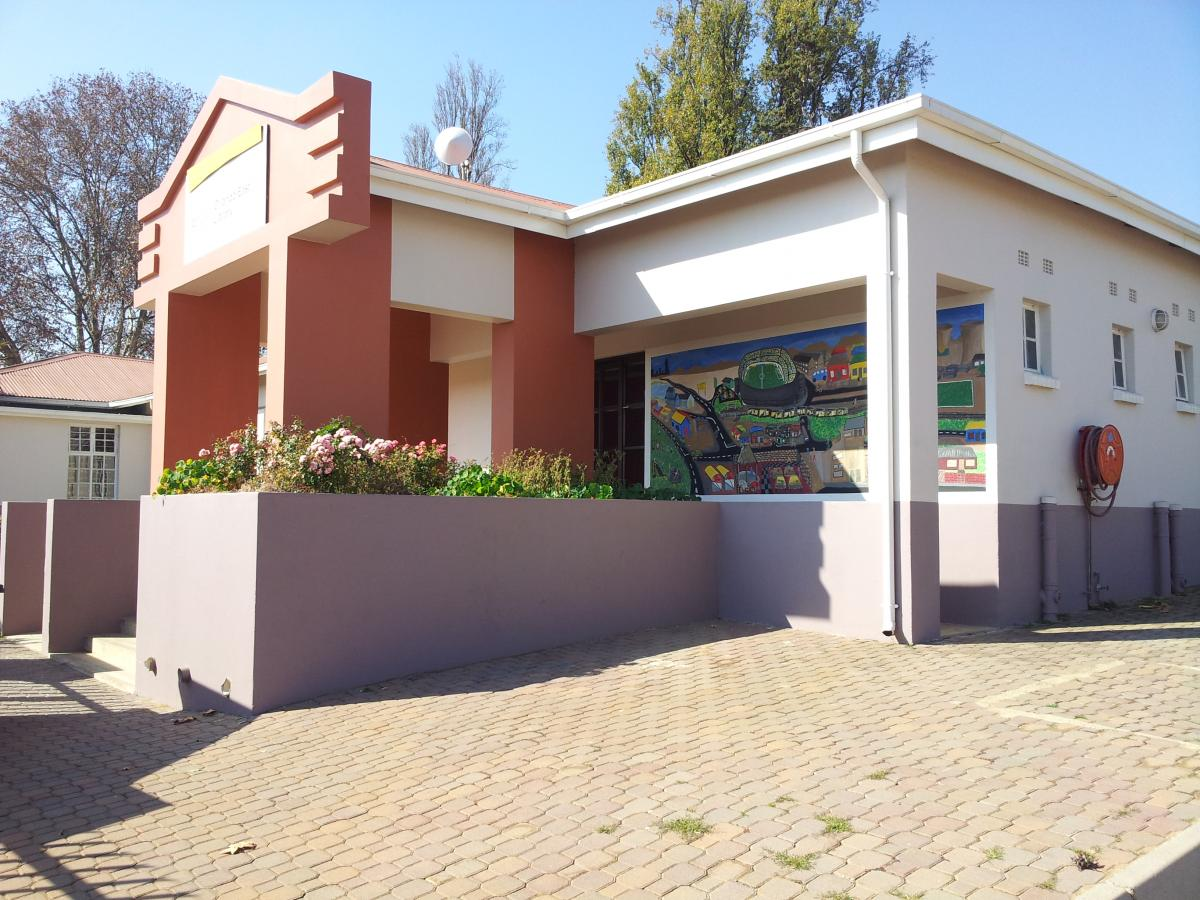
Orlando East Public Library

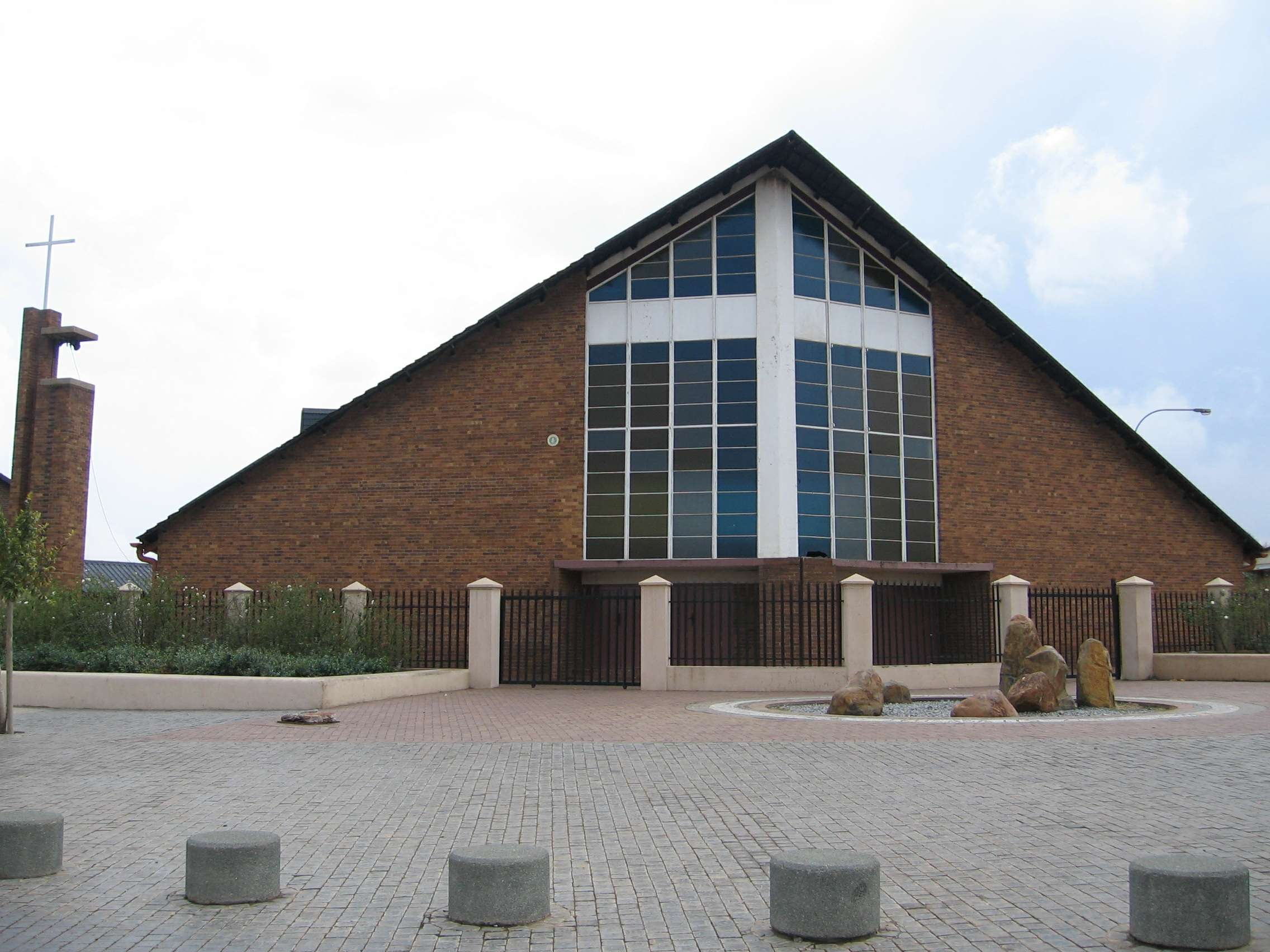
The Regina Mundi church in Moroka, Soweto

A street in Orlando West
