= Lillydale, Mpumalanga =

Lillydale
- Location within Mpumalanga Location within South Africa
- Coordinates: 24.872°S 31.365°E
- Country: South Africa
- Province: Mpumalanga
- District: Ehlanzeni
- Municipality: Bushbuckridge

Area
  - Total: 4.61 km^{2} (1.78 sq mi)

Population (2011)
  - Total: 6,799
  - Density: 1,470/km^{2} (3,820/sq mi)

Racial makeup (2011)
  - Black African: 99.8%
  - Coloured: 0.1%

XiTsongas (2011)
  - Tsonga: 97.0%
  - Other: 3.0%
- Time zone: UTC+2 (SAST)
- PO box: 1281

Lillydale is a village in Ehlanzeni District Municipality in the Mpumalanga province of South Africa.
