= Naledi High School =

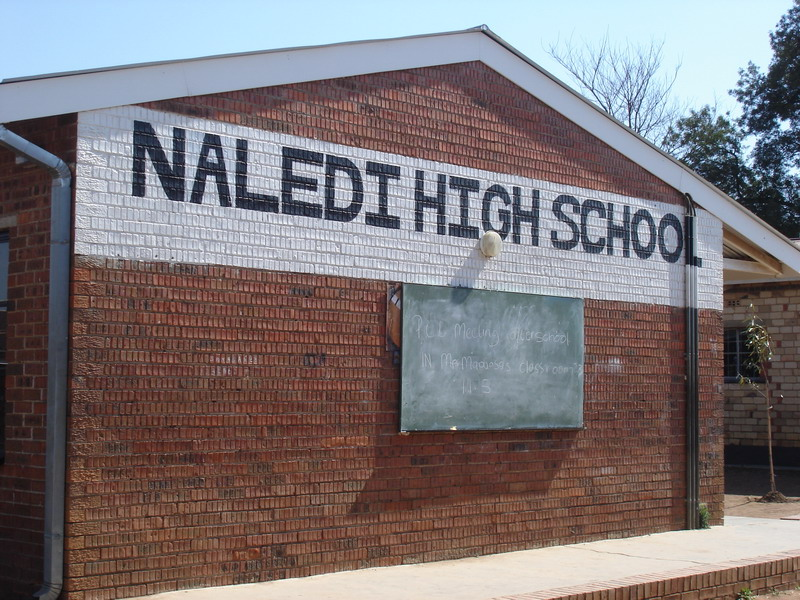

Location
- 26.25048°S 27.831368°E

Information
- Type: Government
- Established: 8 June 1963
- Principal: Kenneth Mavathulana

Naledi High School is a government secondary school at 892 Nape Street in Soweto. The school took an important role at the start of the Soweto Uprising in 1976.

== History ==
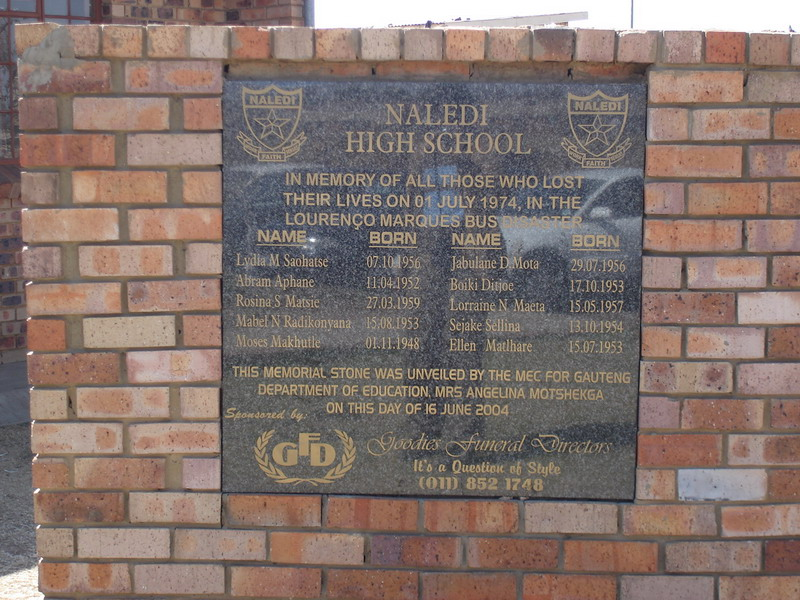
Bus disaster

The school was founded in 1963.

On 1 July 1974 there was a bus accident that involved a number of pupils from the school and ten were killed. Today there is a plaque recording the Lourenco Marques Bus disaster and its victims in the school grounds. The plaque was unveiled thirty years after the accident in 2009.

On 8 June 1976 the South African Police attempted to arrest Enos Ngutshane who was the local leader of the South African Students Movement. He had written a letter of protest to the Minister for Education to protest that subjects like history, geography and mathematics would be taught through the medium of Afrikaans. The police failed to apprehend him and the police were stoned and a Volkswagen Beetle was set on fire by the students. Ngutshane was not arrested until a week later and he was in court when the Soweto Uprising started. Students had gathered at Naledi High School to walk to Morris Isaacson High School in Jabavu. The plan was to gather at Orlando Stadium but before that the police arrived and school children were shot.

The school achieved a pass rate of 8% but they were able to increase that to 61% in 2000. In 2025 just fifteen pupils sat the matric exams and they all failed.

== Alumni ==
Notable alumni include:

- Enos Ngutshane – activist, now a manager
- Zanele Mthemb – Gauteng department of education's chief director
- Frank Chikane – former presidency director-general
- Popo Molefe – North West premier Chairman of the boards of PRASA, Transnet and PetroSA
- Dan Molefe – diplomat
- Mike Siluma – South African Broadcasting Corporation acting chief operations officer
- Sidney Khotso Seatlholo - second chairman of the Soweto Students Representative Council (SSRC)

== Today ==
The head reports a pass rate around 70% in 2013.

A plaque was unveiled in 2013 by the Mayor of Johannesburg, Amos Masondo, to mark Naledi's contribution to Johannesburg Heritage. Also returning that day was Enos Ngutshane who had an assembly point named in his honour.

The school hopes to build a museum at the school that would feature the car burnt by pupils in 1976.
