= Soweto uprising =

1976 student-led anti-apartheid protests in South Africa

- Part of the Internal resistance to apartheid
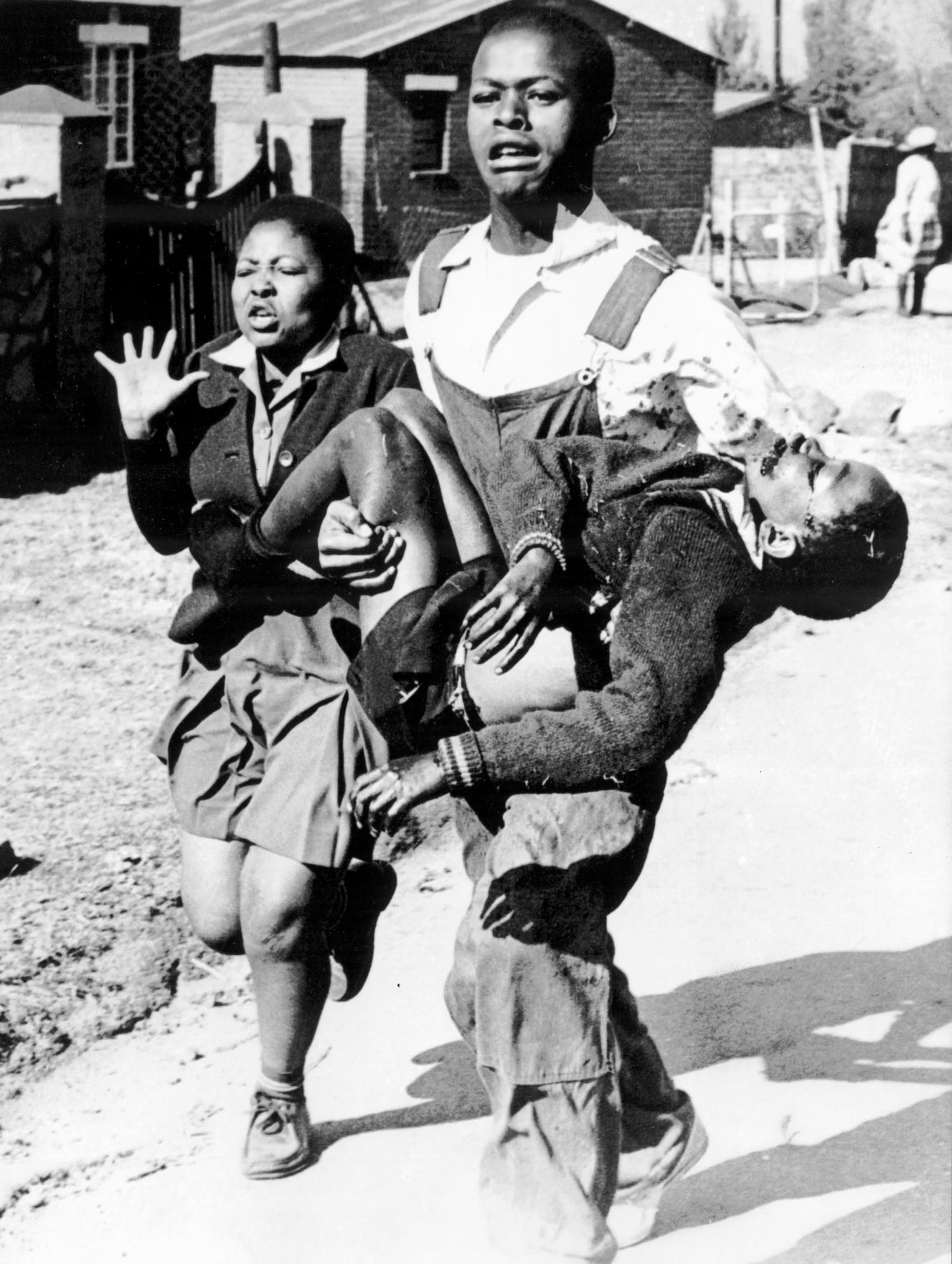
- Hector Pieterson carried by Mbuyisa Makhubo after being shot by the South African Police. His sister, Antoinette Sithole, runs beside them. Pieterson was rushed to a local clinic, where he was declared dead on arrival. This photo by Sam Nzima became an icon of the Soweto uprising.
- Location: Soweto, South Africa
- Date: 16–18 June 1976
- Deaths: 176+
- Injuries: 1,000+
- Victim: Students
- Assailant: South African Police

The Soweto uprising, also known as the Soweto riots or the Soweto rebellion, was a series of demonstrations and protests led by black school children in South Africa during apartheid that began on the morning of 16 June 1976.

Students from various schools began to protest in the streets of the Soweto township in response to the introduction of Afrikaans, considered by many black South Africans as the "language of the oppressor", as the medium of instruction in black schools. It is estimated that 20,000 students took part in the protests. They were met with fierce police brutality, and many were shot and killed. 176 pupils had been killed in Soweto by the end of June 16. The uprising sparked unrest throughout South Africa, with 575 deaths from violence by the end of February 1977. The riots were a key moment in the fight against apartheid as it sparked renewed opposition against apartheid in South Africa both domestically and internationally. In remembrance of these events, 16 June is a public holiday in South Africa, named Youth Day. Internationally, 16 June is known as The Day of the African Child.

== Causes ==
Black South African high school students in Soweto protested against the Afrikaans Medium Decree of 1974, which forced all black schools to use Afrikaans and English in equal terms as languages of instruction. The association of Afrikaans with apartheid prompted black South Africans to prefer English. Even the Bantustan regimes chose English and an indigenous African language as official languages. In addition, English was gaining prominence as the language most often used in commerce and industry. The 1974 decree was intended to force the reverse of the decline of Afrikaans among black Africans. The Afrikaner-dominated government used the clause of the 1909 Union of South Africa Act that recognised only English and Dutch, the latter being replaced by Afrikaans in 1925, as official languages as its pretext. All schools had to provide instruction in both Afrikaans and English as languages, but white South African students learned other subjects in their home language.

The Regional Director of Bantu Education (Northern Transvaal Region), J. G. Erasmus, told Circuit Inspectors and Principals of Schools that from 1 January 1975, Afrikaans had to be used for mathematics, arithmetic, and social studies from standard five (7th grade), according to the Afrikaans Medium Decree. English would be the medium of instruction for general science and practical subjects (homecraft, needlework, woodwork, metalwork, art, agricultural science). Indigenous languages would be used only for religious instruction, music, and physical culture.

The decree was resented deeply by the black population. Desmond Tutu, the bishop of Lesotho, stated that Afrikaans was "the language of the oppressor." Also, teacher organisations, such as the African Teachers Association of South Africa, objected to the decree.

Punt Janson, the Deputy Minister of Bantu Education, was quoted as saying: "A Black man may be trained to work on a farm or in a factory. He may work for an employer who is either English-speaking or Afrikaans-speaking and the man who has to give him instructions may be either English-speaking or Afrikaans-speaking. Why should we now start quarrelling about the medium of instruction among the Black people as well?... No, I have not consulted them and I am not going to consult them. I have consulted the Constitution of the Republic of South Africa...."

A change in language of instruction forced the students to focus on understanding the language, instead of the subject material. That made critical analysis of the content difficult and discouraged critical thinking.

The resentment grew until 30 April 1976, when children at Orlando West Junior School in Soweto went on strike and refused to go to school. Their rebellion then spread to many other schools in Soweto. Black South African students protested because they believed that they deserved to be treated and taught like white South Africans. Also, very few people in Soweto spoke Afrikaans. A student from Morris Isaacson High School, Teboho "Tsietsi" Mashinini, proposed a meeting on 13 June 1976 to discuss what should be done. Students formed an Action Committee, later known as the Soweto Students' Representative Council, which organised a peaceful demonstration for 16 June. The route was planned to pass Orlando West to show solidarity with the students' original strike. Students from different areas within Soweto would then congregate at Orlando Stadium before marching to deliver a memorandum of student grievances to the Department of Bantu Education offices.

== Uprising ==
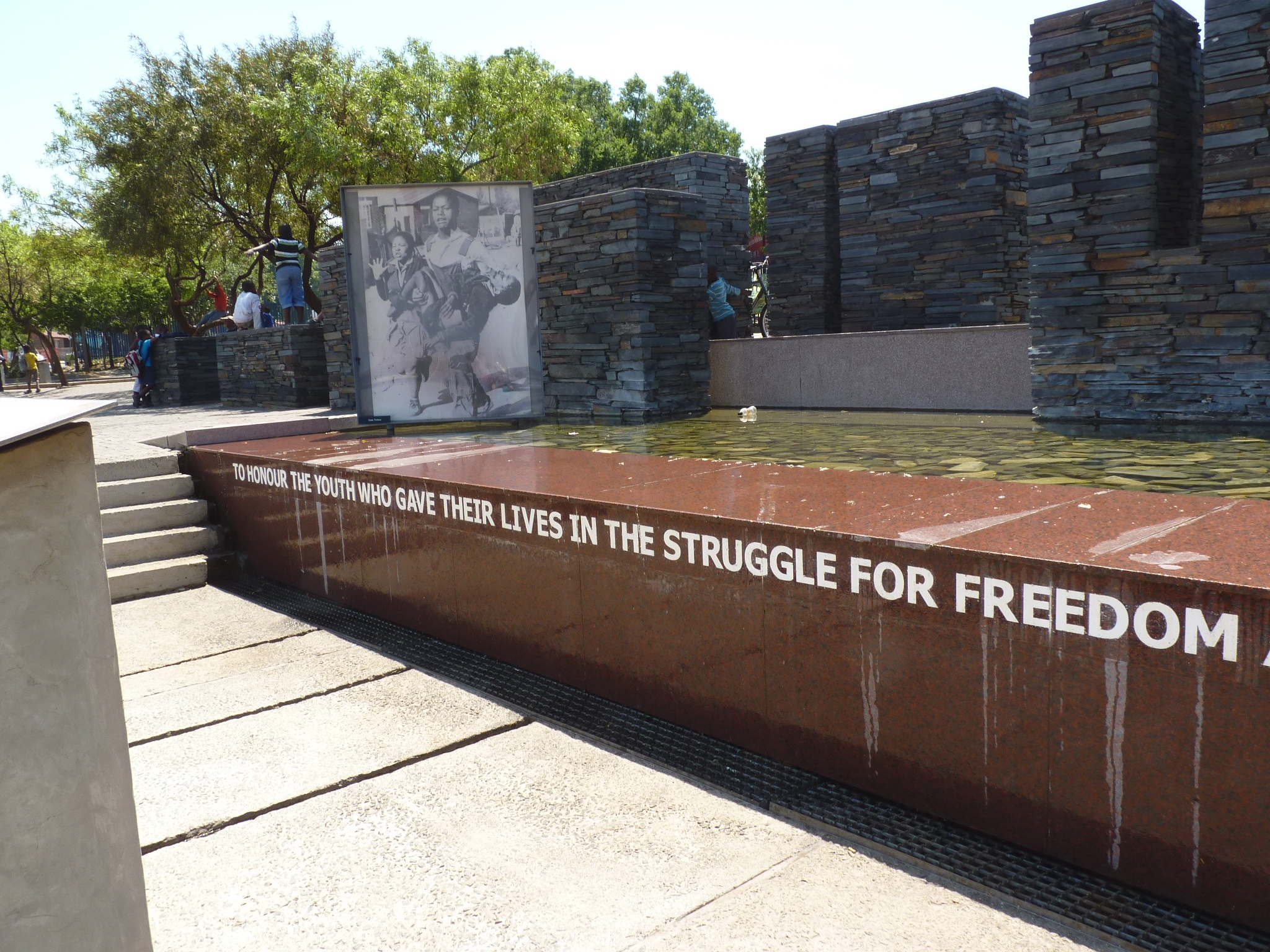
Hector Pieterson Memorial in Soweto

On the morning of 16 June 1976, between 3,000 and 20,000 black students walked from their schools to Orlando Stadium for a rally to protest having to learn in Afrikaans in school. Many students who later participated in the protest arrived at schools that morning without prior knowledge of the protest but agreed to become involved. This meant many parents were not aware of the intended action. The protest was planned by the Soweto Students' Representative Council's (SSRC) Action Committee, with support from the wider Black Consciousness Movement. Teachers in Soweto also supported the march after the Action Committee emphasised good discipline and peaceful actions.

At roughly 08h00, Tsietsi Mashinini led students from Morris Isaacson High School to join up with others who walked from Naledi High School. The students began the march, only to find out that police had barricaded the road along their intended route. The leader of the action committee asked the crowd not to provoke the police, and the march continued on another route and eventually ended up near Orlando High School. The crowd of between 3,000 and 10,000 students made its way towards the area of the school. Students sang and waved placards with slogans such as, "Down with Afrikaans", "Viva Azania" and "If we must do Afrikaans, Vorster must do Zulu".

The police used tear gas, batons, and live ammunition as crowd control. The police set trained dogs on the protesters, who responded by killing one. The police then began to massacre the group, shooting indiscriminately at the students.

Among the first students to be shot dead were 15-year-old Hastings Ndlovu and 12-year-old Hector Pieterson, who were shot at Orlando West High School. The photographer Sam Nzima took a photograph of a dying Hector Pieterson as he was carried away by Mbuyisa Makhubo and accompanied by his sister, Antoinette, which became the symbol of the Soweto uprising. The police attacks on the demonstrators continued, and 23 people died on the first day in Soweto. Among them was Melville Edelstein, who was a West Rand Administration Board officer, sociologist and academic and had devoted his efforts to humanitarian and social welfare projects in Soweto. Serving as Deputy Chief Welfare Officer, Edelstein instituted many projects aimed at assisting youth, disabled, poor, and marginalised communities within Soweto. He was stoned to death by the mob and left with a sign around his neck proclaiming, "Beware: Afrikaans is the most dangerous drug for our future".

The violence escalated, as bottle stores and beer halls, seen as outposts of the apartheid government, were targeted, as were the official outposts of the state. The violence had abated by nightfall. Police vans and armoured vehicles patrolled the streets throughout the night.

Emergency clinics were swamped with injured and bloody children. The police requested for the hospital to provide a list of all victims with bullet wounds to prosecute them for rioting. The hospital administrator passed the request to the doctors, but the doctors refused to create the list. The doctors recorded bullet wounds as abscesses.

1,500 armed police officers were deployed to Soweto on 17 June carrying weapons, including automatic rifles, stun guns, and carbines. They drove around in armoured vehicles with helicopters monitoring the area from above. The South African Army was also ordered on standby as a tactical measure to show military force. Crowd control methods used by South African police at the time included mainly dispersement techniques. Hundreds of people were arrested, including activist Connie Mofokeng, who was tortured for information.

== Casualties and aftermath ==
The number of people who died in the massacre on June 16 is usually given as 176. The original government figure claimed only 23 students were killed, with the number of wounded estimated to be more than 1,000 people. Black students also killed two white people during the uprising, one of them was Melville Edelstein.

The clashes occurred while the South African government was being forced to "transform" apartheid in international eyes towards a more "benign" form. In October 1976, Transkei, the first Bantustan, was proclaimed "independent" by the government. That attempt to showcase supposed South African "commitment" to self-determination backfired, however, since Transkei was internationally derided as a puppet state.

Many white South Africans were outraged at the government's actions in Soweto. The day after the massacre, about 400 white students from the University of the Witwatersrand marched through Johannesburg's city centre in protest of the killing of children. Black workers went on strike as well and joined them as the campaign progressed. Riots also broke out in the black townships of other cities in South Africa.

Student organisations directed the energy and anger of the youth toward political resistance. Students in Thembisa organised a successful and nonviolent solidarity march, but a similar protest held in Kagiso led to police stopping a group of participants, forcing them to retreat, and killing at least five people while reinforcements were awaited. The violence died down only on 18 June. The University of Zululand's records and administration buildings were set ablaze, and 33 people died in incidents in Port Elizabeth in August. In Cape Town, 92 people died between August and September.

Most of the bloodshed had abated by the end of 1976. According to The Times, by that time more than 700 people had been killed throughout the country in the violence that had begun with the student uprising in Soweto. The Cillie Commission set up to investigate the uprising and its aftermath estimated 575 deaths from violence up to 28 February 1977, including 390 in Transvaal province and 137 in Western Cape province. The breakdown was 496 black Africans, 75 coloured, 2 white and 2 Indians.

The continued clashes in Soweto caused economic instability. The South African rand devalued fast, and the government was plunged into a crisis. The African National Congress printed and distributed leaflets with the slogan "Free Mandela, Hang Vorster". It immediately linked the language issue to its revolutionary heritage and programme and helped to establish its leading role.

The Hector Pieterson Memorial and Museum opened in Soweto in 2002, not far from the spot where 12-year-old Hector was shot on 16 June 1976. Hector's older sister, Antoinette, who was 17 at the time and appeared running alongside her brother in the famous photo that became symbolic of the day, gave tours at the museum.

=== International reactions ===
The UN Security Council passed Resolution 392, which strongly condemned the incident and the apartheid government.

A week after the uprising began, US Secretary of State Henry Kissinger met South African State President Vorster in West Germany to discuss the situation in Rhodesia, but the Soweto uprising did not feature in the discussions. Kissinger and Vorster met again in Pretoria in September 1976, with students in Soweto and elsewhere protesting his visit and being fired on by police.

=== 1986 massacre ===
On the night of 26 August 1986, the police opened fire on a demonstration in the White City locale. They killed between 20 and 25 people, possibly more, and wounded more than 60. The South African government officially claimed that 11 people had died but later raised the figure to 12. The South African Information Bureau claimed that police opened fire on two occasions, one after a grenade had been tossed at police and wounded four policemen. Residents said that the fighting started when local officials sought to evict tenants who had been refusing to pay their rents for two months as part of a mass boycott. Security forces were said to have initially used tear gas to disperse crowds. Later, a resident telephoned a reporter to say, "The police are shooting left and right. They just shot an old man. They are shooting at everyone, everything."

The UDF leader Frank Chikane described the police actions "as if entering enemy territory, with guns blazing." Minister of Information Louis Nel later came under fire for stating at a press conference, "Let there be no misunderstanding regarding the real issue at stake. It is not the rental issue, it is not the presence of security forces in black residential areas, it is not certain remembrance days, it is not school programs. The violent overthrow of the South African state is the issue."

As retaliation, a black town councillor was killed the following day, hacked to death by a mob. On 4 September, police filled a stadium with tear gas to stop a mass funeral for a number of the victims, swept through Soweto and broke up other services being held, including one at Regina Mundi Roman Catholic, where tear gas canisters were thrown into a bus containing mourners. A service at Avalon Cemetery at which thousands were reported to have gathered was also dispersed with tear gas and armoured vehicles. Tear gas was also reported to have been dropped from helicopters on processions and crowds.

== In media ==
Images of the protests spread all over the world and shocked millions. The photograph of Hector Pieterson's dead body, as captured by the photojournalist Sam Nzima, caused outrage and brought down international condemnation on the apartheid government.

The Soweto uprising was depicted in the 1987 film by the director Richard Attenborough, Cry Freedom and in the 1992 musical film Sarafina! and the musical production of the same name by Mbongeni Ngema. The riots also inspired the novel A Dry White Season by Andre Brink and a 1989 movie of the same title.

The uprising also featured in the 2003 film Stander about the notorious bank robber and former police captain Andre Stander. The lyrics of the song "Soweto Blues" by Hugh Masekela and Miriam Makeba describe the Soweto Uprising and the children's part in it.

=== Radio ===
In June 1996, the Ulwazi Educational Radio Project in Johannesburg compiled an hour-long radio documentary 20 years after the uprising portraying the events of 16 June entirely from the perspective of people living in Soweto at the time. Many of the students who planned or joined the uprising, as well as other witnesses, took part, including the photographer Peter Magubane, the reporter Sophie Tema and Tim Wilson, the white doctor who pronounced Pieterson dead in Baragwanath Hospital. The programme was broadcast on SABC and on a number of local radio stations throughout South Africa. The following year, BBC Radio 4 and the BBC World Service broadcast a revised version, containing fresh interviews, The Day Apartheid Died.

The programme was runner-up at the 1998 European Community Humanitarian Office (ECHO) TV & Radio Awards and also at the 1998 Media Awards of the One World International Broadcasting Trust and was highly commended at the 1998 Prix Italia radio awards. In May 1999, it was rebroadcast by BBC Radio 4 as The Death of Apartheid, with a fresh introduction that provided added historical context for a British audience by Anthony Sampson, a former editor of Drum magazine and the author of the authorised biography (1999) of Nelson Mandela. Sampson linked extracts from the BBC Sound Archive that charted the long struggle against apartheid from the Sharpeville massacre of 1960 to the riots of 1976 and the murder of Steve Biko until Mandela's release from prison in 1990 and the future president's speech in which he acknowledged the debt owed by all black South Africans to the students who had given their lives in Soweto on 16 June 1976.

== See also ==
- Hector Pieterson
- Hastings Ndlovu
- Vaal uprising
- History of South Africa
- Liberation before education
- International Day of the African Child

== Sources ==
- Baines, Gary. "The Master Narrative of South Africa's Liberation Struggle: Remembering and Forgetting 16 June 1976, International Journal of African Historical Studies (2007), 40#2 pp. 283–302 in JSTOR
- Brewer, John D. After Soweto: an unfinished journey (Oxford University Press, 1986)
- Hirson, Baruch. Year of Fire, Year of Ash. The Soweto Revolt: Roots of a Revolution? (Zed Books, 1979)
