= Hector Pieterson =

South African schoolboy shot dead during a protest against apartheid (1963–1976)

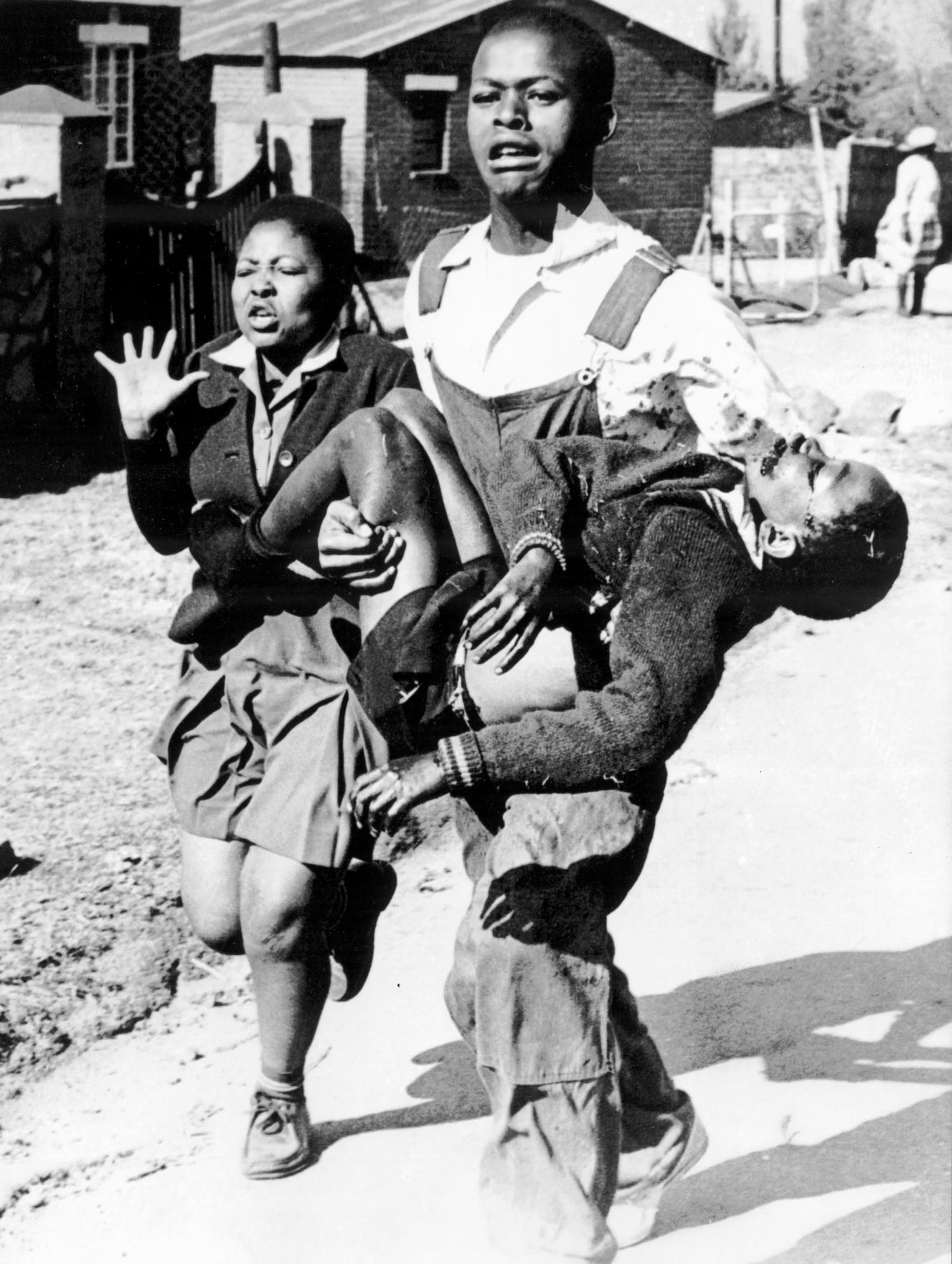
- Pieterson being carried by Mbuyisa Makhubu. His sister, Antoinette Sithole, runs beside them
- Born: Zolile Hector Pieterson; August 19, 1963; Soweto, Johannesburg, South Africa
- Died: June 16, 1976 (aged 12); Soweto, Johannesburg, South Africa
- Cause of death: Gunshot wound
- Resting place: Avalon Cemetery, Johannesburg, South Africa
- Known for: Student killed during the Soweto uprising
- Relatives: Antoinette Sithole (sister)

Zolile Hector Pieterson (18 August 1963 – 16 June 1976) was a South African schoolboy who was shot and killed at the age of 12 during the Soweto uprising in 1976, when the police opened fire on black students protesting the enforcement of teaching in Afrikaans, mostly spoken by the white and coloured populations in South Africa, as the medium of instruction for all school subjects.

The pupils wanted to learn in their native languages, Xhosa and Zulu. A news photograph by Sam Nzima of the mortally wounded Pieterson being carried by another Soweto resident while his sister ran next to them was published around the world. The anniversary of his death is the designated Youth Day in South Africa.

== Soweto uprising ==
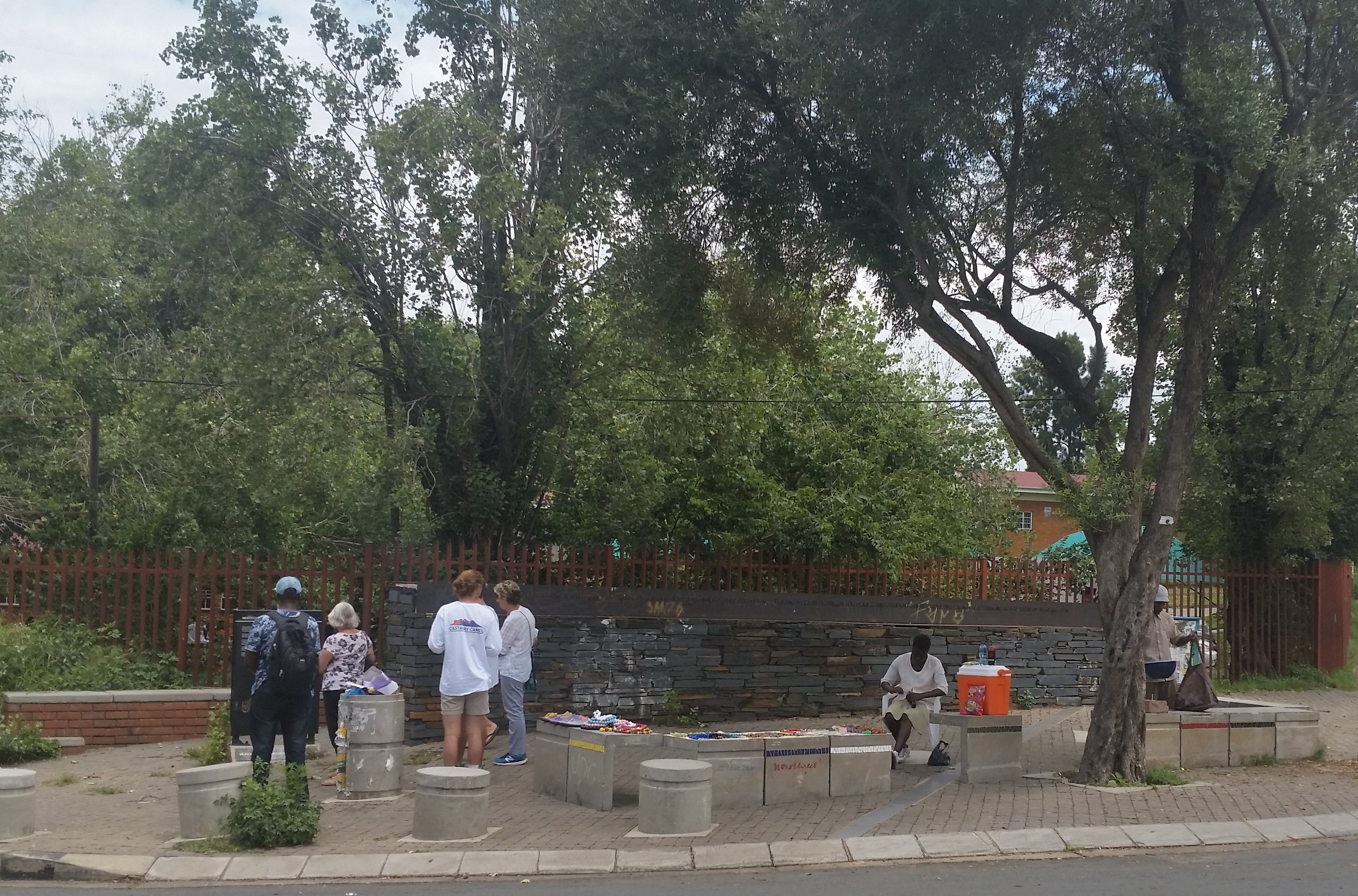
The site where Hector Pieterson is reputed to have been shot by police. It now has a memorial to his memory.

On 16 June 1976, school children protested the implementation of Afrikaans and English as dual medium of instruction in secondary schools in a 50:50 basis. This was implemented throughout South Africa regardless of the locally-spoken language and some exams were also written in Afrikaans. An estimated 10,000 junior and high school students gathered to peacefully demonstrate, but the crowd soon became intimidated when police convoys arrived and set police dogs on the student protestors, and started to throw stones.

The police arrived and fired tear gas into the crowd in order to disperse them. There are conflicting accounts of who gave the first command to shoot, but soon children were turning and running in all directions, leaving some children lying wounded on the road.

Although the media often named Pieterson as the first child to die that day, another boy, Hastings Ndlovu, was actually the first child to be shot. But in the case of Hastings, there were no photographers on the scene, and his name was not immediately known.

When Pieterson was shot, he fell on the corner of Moema and Vilakazi Streets. He was picked up by Mbuyisa Makhubu who, together with Pieterson's sister Antoinette Sithole (then 17 years old), ran towards Sam Nzima's car. They bundled him in, and journalist Sophie Tema drove him to a nearby clinic where he was pronounced dead. Mbuyisa and Nzima were harassed by the police after the incident and both went into hiding. Mbuyisa's mother told the Truth and Reconciliation Commission that she received a letter from Mbuyisa in 1978 from Nigeria but she has not heard from him since. Pieterson and Hastings Ndlovu are buried at the Avalon Cemetery, Soweto. Ten people died as well and 250 people were injured.

== Surname ==
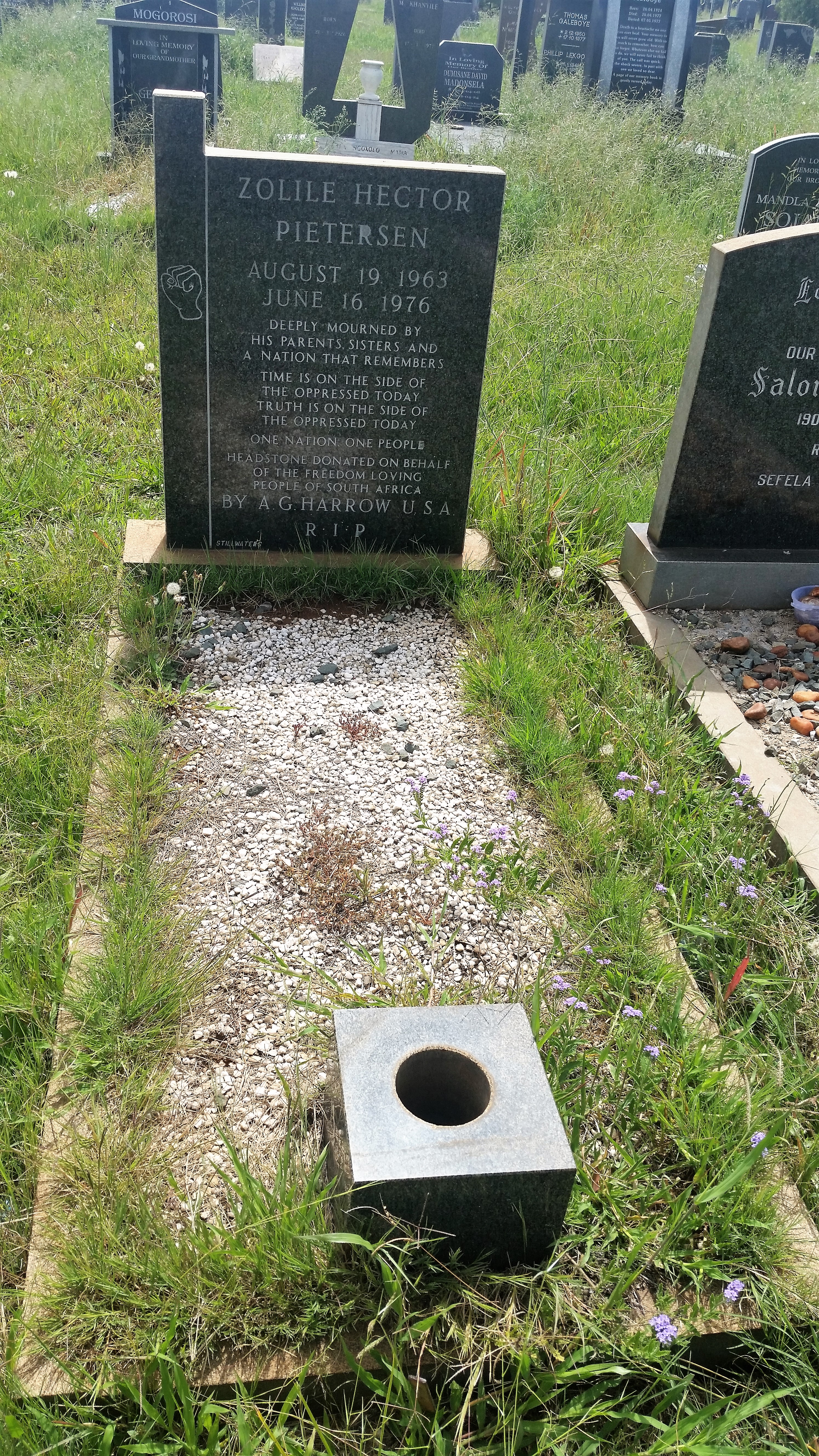
The grave of Hector Pieterson at Avalon Cemetery, Soweto

Since June 1976, Pieterson's surname has often appeared in the media as Peterson and Pietersen, the latter being the spelling engraved on the tombstone. According to the family, the correct spelling is Pieterson.

== Lawsuit ==
On 9 August 2002, U.S. lawyer Ed Fagan led a $50bn class action suit by apartheid-era victims against international firms and banks who profited from dealings with the apartheid regime. Among the plaintiffs in the lawsuit was Dorothy Molefi, Pieterson's mother. The post-apartheid South African government distanced themselves from the lawsuit. Fagan had filed a string of lawsuits over human-rights issues brought in order to force companies to settle. The cases were thrown out in 2004.

== Memorial and museum ==
On 16 June 2002, the Hector Pieterson Museum was opened near the place he was shot in Orlando West, Soweto, to honour Pieterson and those who died around the country in the 1976 uprising. Funded by the Department of Environmental Affairs and Tourism (R16 million) and the Johannesburg City Council (R7.2 million), it has become a major tourist attraction. The start of the museum begins with pictures of Pieterson's death. The museum fuses memorabilia with modern technology and cultural history. As of 2010, Pieterson's sister Antoinette, who is seen in the photograph, works at the museum as a tour guide.

== See also ==
- Soweto uprising
