= Holy Trinity Catholic Church, Braamfontein =

Holy Trinity Catholic Church
- Holy Trinity Catholic Church
- 26°11′32.2″S 28°01′59.0″E
- Location: Cnr Jorissen St and Jan Smuts Ave, Braamfontein
- Country: South Africa
- Denomination: Roman Catholic
- Website: trinityjhb.co.za

History
- Former name: The New Catholic Church of the Holy Trinity
- Founded: 1897
- Dedication: The Holy Trinity
- Dedicated: 25 May 1997 (Trinity Sunday)

Architecture
- Architect: Brendan Joseph Clinch
- Architectural type: Romanesque Revival
- Years built: 1937-1938
- Groundbreaking: 18 July 1937
- Completed: 11 September 1938

Administration
- Archdiocese: Johannesburg
- Deanery: Central
- Parish: Braamfontein

Clergy
- Pastor(s): Fr Russell Pollitt, S.J.

Holy Trinity Catholic Church is a Catholic parish church located in Braamfontein in north-central Johannesburg.

== History ==
A mission was established in 1897 by Trappist monks from Mariannhill, Natal Colony, marking the beginning of the parish. The original Holy Trinity Catholic Church was built soon after in 1899, shortly before the outbreak of the Second Boer War. When the war started, the Trappists returned to Mariannhill and the Missionary Oblates of Mary Immaculate took up responsibility for the parish. Later they oversaw the process of replacing the original, hastily built church with a more permanent structure.

The current Holy Trinity Catholic Church was designed in Romanesque Revival style by the Irish Catholic architect Brendan Joseph Clinch, an associate of Herbert Baker. Construction started in 1937 and was completed the following year in 1938. Initially it was one of the largest buildings in Braamfontein – and prominently visible throughout the area – but as Johannesburg developed and the neighbouring University of the Witwatersrand (Wits University) grew, the church became dwarfed by its surroundings.

In 1966 the Paulist Fathers assumed responsibility for the parish until this reverted temporarily to the archdiocese in 1969. Since 1973 responsibility for Holy Trinity Catholic Church has belonged to the Jesuits. The parish's Jesuits also run the Catholic chaplaincies to Wits University and the University of Johannesburg, and as such they minister to the spiritual needs of Catholic students at these institutions.

=== 2016 #FeesMustFall protests ===
During the August–October 2016 resurgence of the #FeesMustFall protest movement and accompanying police crackdown, the parish opened the Holy Trinity Catholic Church to students and others seeking refuge from the rubber bullets and stun grenades that were regularly being employed by the police to disperse crowds. In accordance with the traditional Christian custom of church sanctuary the church was opened to anyone fleeing the violence. Those who came in armed in any way were told to either dump their weapons outside the church grounds or leave.

On 11 October, after a number of rubber bullets had been shot into the church grounds by a police Nyala patrolling the area, the head pastor Fr Graham Pugin took up position in front of the church's gate and attempted to bar the armoured vehicle from entering. After a tense standoff the Nyala seemed at first to back off and drive away, and the students emerged from the church to thank and congratulate Fr Graham. At this point the Nyala drove past the church at low speed while the police inside indiscriminately fired rubber bullets at Fr Graham and the students behind him. Fr Graham was hit on his upper lip and needed to be rushed to the Charlotte Maxeke Hospital for facial reconstruction surgery. The shooting of Fr Graham brought international attention to the parish, and was criticised by the Jesuit Institute South Africa and the Vatican ambassador to South Africa, among others. Later a police delegation led by the Deputy National Police Commissioner Gary Kruger visited Fr Graham as he was recovering to "apologise unconditionally" for the incident.

On 19 October, while the church was hosting talks aiming toward a "peace accord" to bring an end to the violence on South Africa's university campuses Adam Habib, the Vice-chancellor of Wits University, was chased out of the church by students. The students' actions were criticised by the Jesuit Institute, who said that the church as a "safe and neutral space has been violated by those who declared God's house to be exclusiveley theirs". As a result, the church is "no longer available as a venue for meeting" because the Jesuits believe "genuine attempts to dialogue and find a resolution to the crisis seem to have ended".

== See also ==
- Regina Mundi, Soweto, often referred to as "the people's cathedral" and famous for its role as a place of sanctuary during the anti-apartheid protests of the 1970s and '80s.
