= Australian rappel =

Face-first abseiling technique

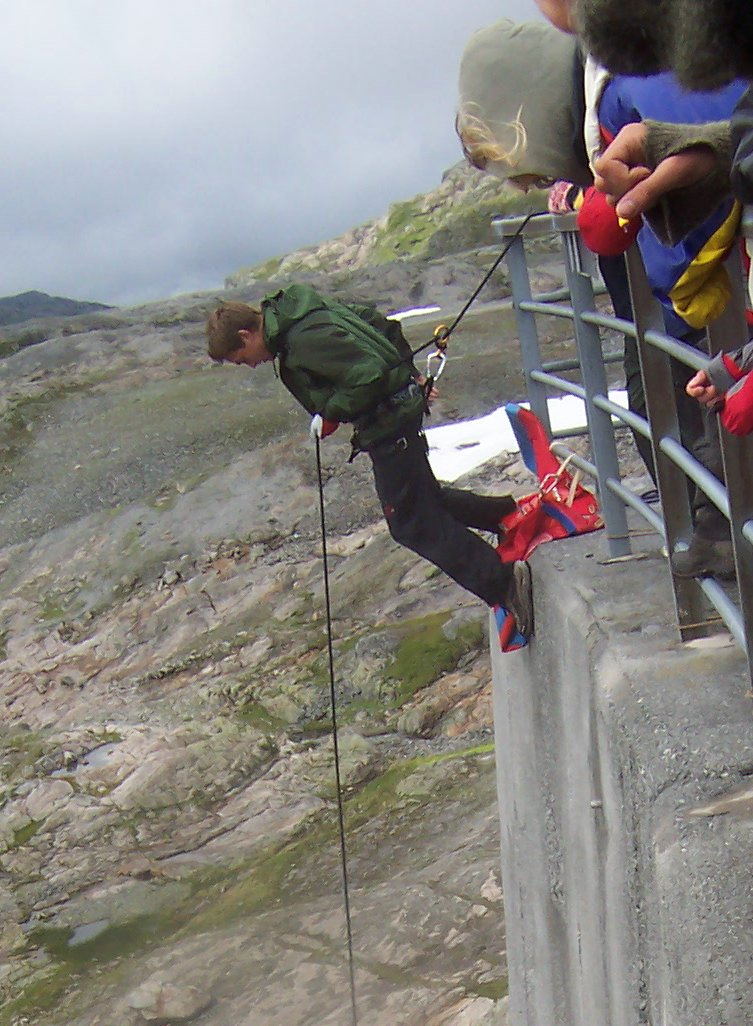
Australian rappel demonstrated at a dam in Norway

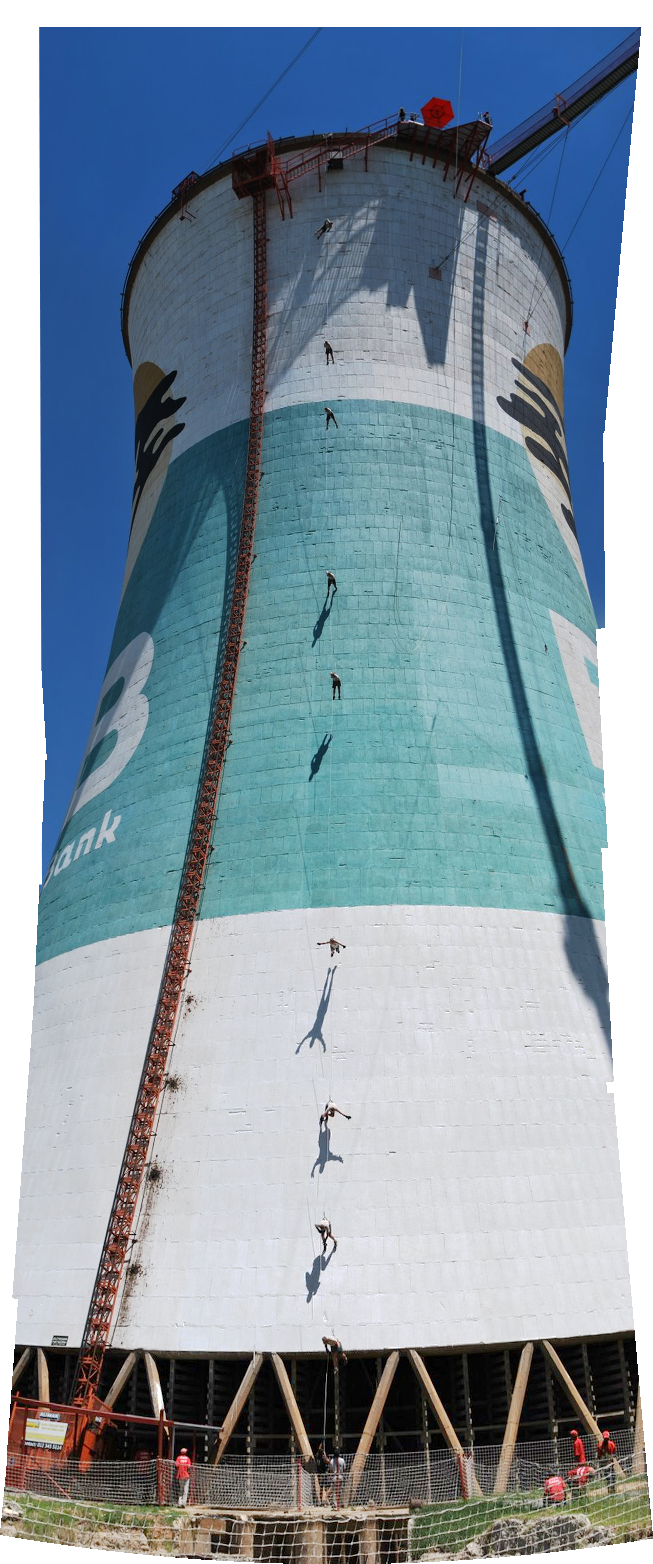
Climber performing Australian rappel on Orlando Power Station cooling towers in Soweto, South Africa

Australian abseiling (also known as Australian rappelling, Rap Jumping, Angel Jumping or deepelling) is the process of descending a fixed rope (abseiling) in a standing position while facing the ground.

The technique is used as a military "assault" technique whereby a soldier is belayed, allowing them to face down the descent and fire a weapon.

In Australia, the technique is not commonly known as "Australian", or even "rappelling"; instead the term "abseiling" is more commonly used and the technique is referred to as "Geneva" style.
