= James Mpanza House =

Home in Johannesburg, South Africa

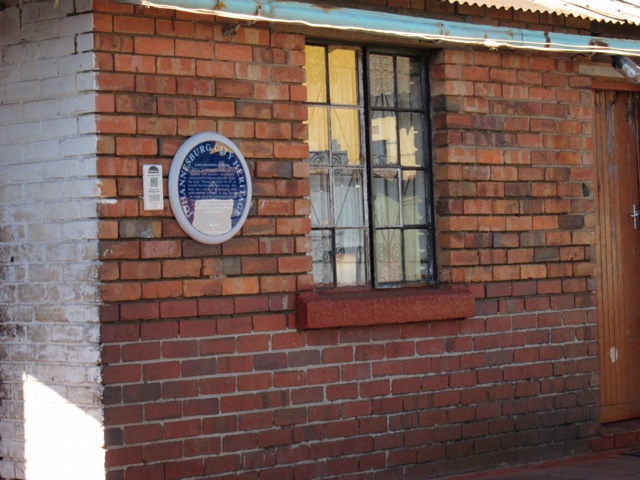
- The Blue Plaque on Mpanza's house
- Interactive map of the James Mpanza House area

General information
- Type: home
- Location: Hlatywayo Street, Johannesburg, South Africa
- Coordinates: 26.2319°S 27.92832°E

The James Mpanza House is a simple house in Orlando near Johannesburg, South Africa. James Mpanza was a champion for the rights of black South Africans to have homes. He and his family lived in this house and it was also a place of public meetings and informal courts.

== Description ==
James Mpanza's house is a single-storey brick building on Hlatywayo Street in Orlando, Soweto.

Mpanza had worked at a solicitors' office before he was convicted of fraud and murder. His death sentence was reprieved but until 1925 he was in jail, where he became an unofficial preacher. He was released on parole to mark a visit by Edward, Prince of Wales. He moved in the 1930s to this house, where he founded the Sofasonke Party in 1935 and with a message of "Housing and Shelter for All" he was elected to the Orlando Advisory Board in 1936. He married Julia Mngomezulu in 1939 and they were to have six children.

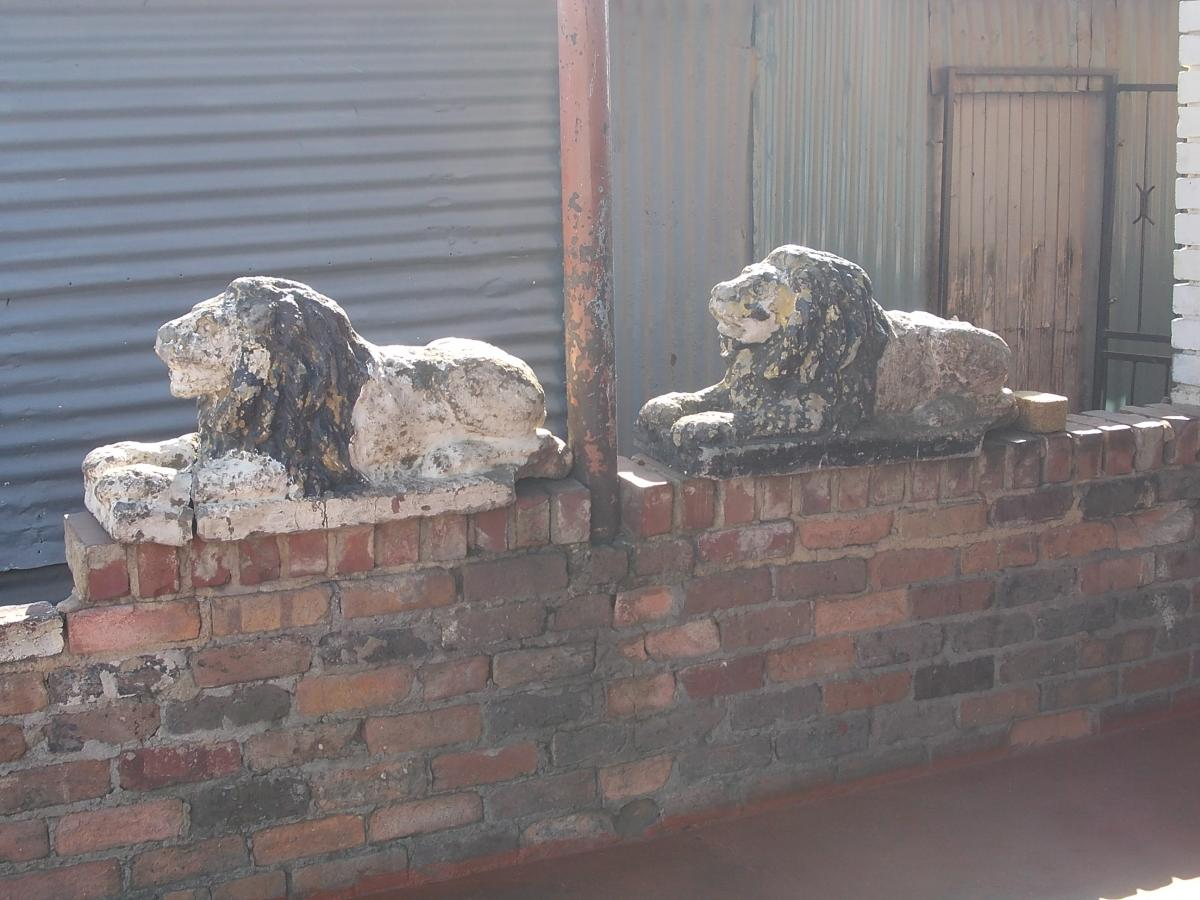
Mpanza Lions on the wall of the James Mpanza House

Mpanza held public meetings at his home in Orlando and in April 1944 he persuaded 8,000 people to go and make a new squatter camp called Sofasonke Township with himself as self declared mayor. By 1946 there were 20,000 people there and Mpanza was organising a police force for the squatters.

Mpanza also operated an informal court at his Orlando home where parents could bring their wayward children. He was known as a man of discipline and he would decide and arrange corporal punishment for the guilty. This was not taking the law entirely into his own hands as if the case was serious then it would be referred to the police. However the later growth of vigilante courts of "makgotla" that were common in Soweto are thought to have been derived from the examples made at Mpanza's house.

Conditions were poor and the death of his son, Dumisani, was thought to be caused by the lack of a medical service. Mpanza had led the land invasion that resulted in the founding of modern Soweto and he was known as 'the father of Soweto'.

He was given an uplifting large civic funeral when he died in 1970 and he was buried in Doornkop cemetery. The "traditional courts" or makgotla that operate today in Soweto are thought to have derived from the "parents courts" that Mpanza operated at his own house. The James Mpanza House where his family lived after his death was given a blue plaque to mark his contribution to the history of South Africa.
