= Soweto =

Township in Metropolitan Johannesburg, Gauteng, South Africa

Soweto South Western Townships
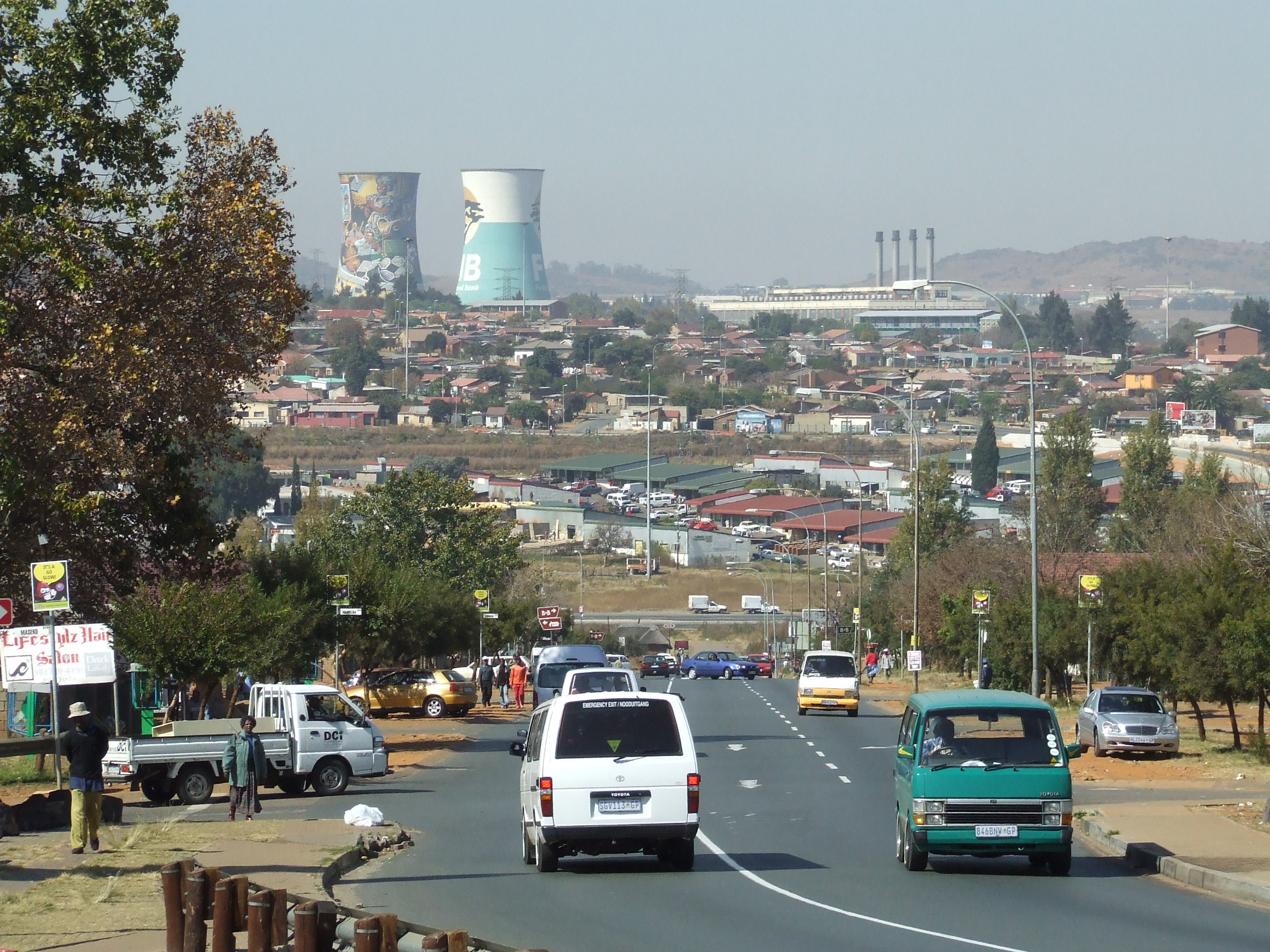
- Orlando Towers in the Orlando suburb of Soweto in 2006

- Location within Gauteng Location within South Africa Location within Africa
- Coordinates: 26°16′04″S 27°51′31″E
- Country: South Africa
- Province: Gauteng
- Municipality: City of Johannesburg

Area
  - Total: 200.03 km^{2} (77.23 sq mi)
- Elevation: 1,632 m (5,354 ft)

Population (2011)
  - Total: 1,271,628
  - Density: 6,357.2/km^{2} (16,465/sq mi)

Racial makeup (2011)
  - Black African: 98.5%
  - Coloured: 1.0%
  - Indian/Asian: 0.1%
  - White: 0.1%
  - Other: 0.2%

First languages (2011)
  - Zulu: 37.1%
  - Sotho: 15.5%
  - Tswana: 12.9%
  - Tsonga: 8.9%
  - Other: 25.6%
- Time zone: UTC+2 (SAST)
- Postal code (street): 1808
- Area code: 011

Soweto (/səˈwɛtoʊ, -ˈweɪt-, -ˈwiːt-/) is a township of the City of Johannesburg Metropolitan Municipality in Gauteng, South Africa and one of the suburbs of Johannesburg, bordering the city's mining belt in the south. Its name is an English syllabic abbreviation for South Western Townships. Formerly a separate municipality, it was incorporated in the City of Johannesburg Metropolitan Municipality in 2002.

== History ==
George Harrison and George Walker are today credited as the men who discovered an outcrop of the Main Reef of gold on the farm Langlaagte in February 1886. The fledgling town of Johannesburg was laid out on a triangular wedge of "uitvalgrond" (area excluded when the farms were surveyed) named Randjeslaagte, situated between the farms Doornfontein to the east, Braamfontein to the west and Turffontein to the south.

Within a decade of the discovery of gold in Johannesburg, 100,000 people flocked to this part of the Zuid-Afrikaansche Republiek in search of riches. They were of many races and nationalities. In October 1887, the government of the South African Republic (ZAR) bought the south-eastern portion of the farm Braamfontein. There were large quantities of clay, suitable for brickmaking, along the stream. The government decided that more money was to be made from issuing brick maker's licences at five shillings per month. The result was that many landless Dutch-speaking burghers (citizens) of the ZAR settled on the property and started making bricks. They also erected their shacks there. Soon, the area was known either Brickfields or Veldschoendorp. Soon other working poor, Coloureds, Indians and Africans also settled there. The government, which sought to differentiate the white working class from the black, laid out new suburbs for the Burghers (Whites), Coolies (Indians), Malays (Coloureds) and Black Africans (Africans), but the whole area simply stayed multiracial.

Soweto was created in the 1930s, when the White government started separating Blacks from Whites, to create black "townships". Blacks were moved away from Johannesburg, to an area separated from White suburbs by a so-called cordon sanitaire (or sanitary corridor) which was usually a river, railway track, industrial area or highway. This was carried out using the infamous Urban Areas Act of 1923.

William Carr, chair of non-European affairs, initiated the naming of Soweto in 1949. He called for a competition to give a collective name to townships dotted around the South-west of Johannesburg. People responded to this competition with great enthusiasm. Among the names suggested to the city council was KwaMpanza, meaning Mpanza's place, invoking the name of Mpanza and his role in bringing the plight of Orlando sub tenants to the attention of the city council. The city council settled for the acronym SOWETO (South West Townships). The name Soweto was first used in 1963 and within a short period of time, following the 1976 uprising of students in the township, the name became internationally known.

Soweto became the largest Black city in South Africa, but until 1976, its population could have status only as temporary residents, serving as a workforce for Johannesburg. It experienced civil unrest during the Apartheid regime. There were serious riots in 1976, sparked by a ruling that Afrikaans be used in African schools there; the riots were violently suppressed, with 176 students killed and more than 1,000 injured. Reforms followed, but riots flared up again in 1985 and continued until the first non-racial elections were held in April 1994. In 2010, South Africa's oldest township hosted the FIFA World Cup Final and the attention of more than a billion soccer spectators from all over the world was focused on Soweto.

=== Kliptown and Pimville ===
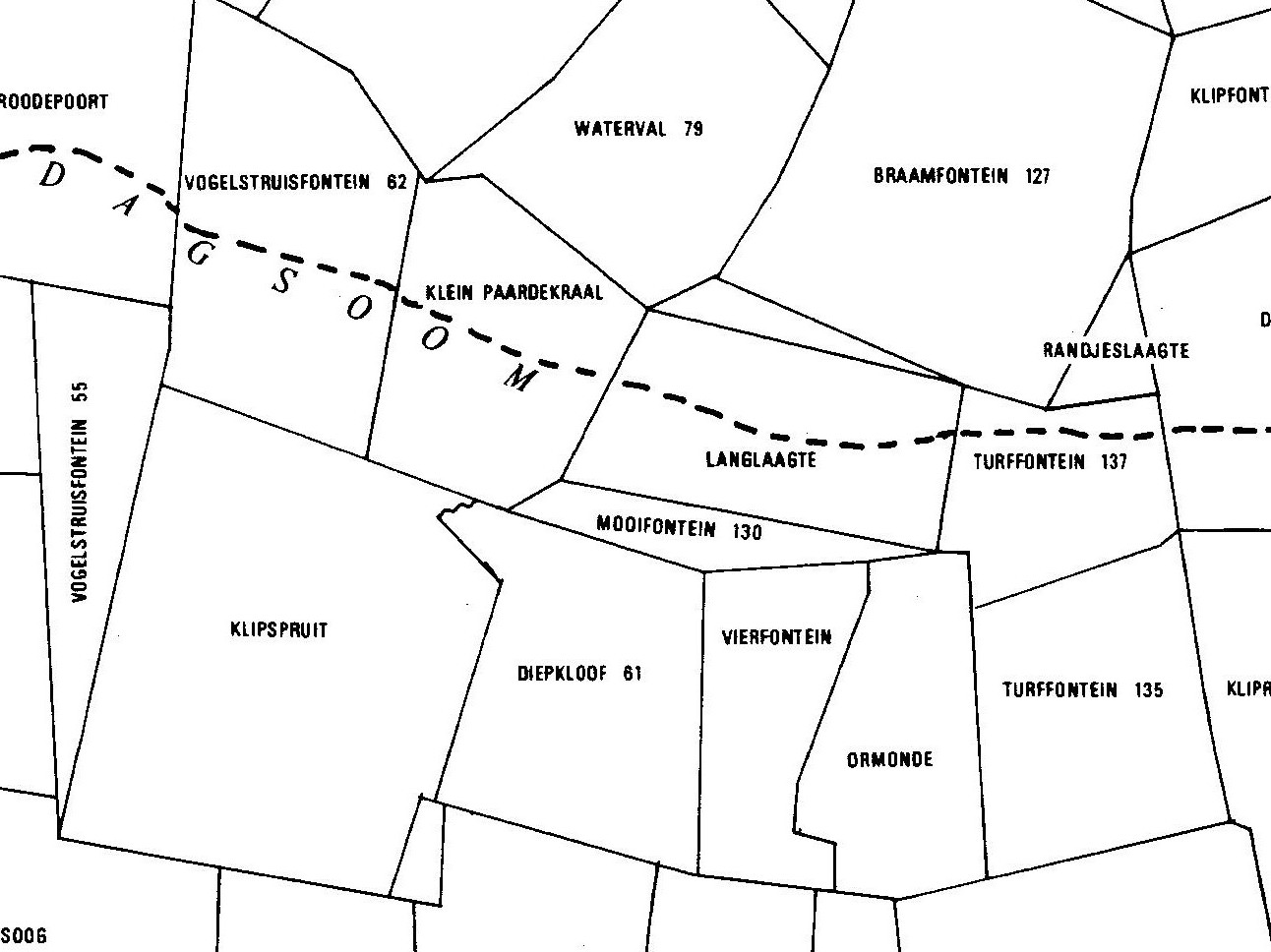
Klipspruit and Diepkloof, South-west of Johannesburg, laid out on Randjeslaagte

In April 1904, there was a bubonic plague scare in the shanty town area of Brickfields. The town council decided to condemn the area and burn it down. Beforehand, most of the Africans living there were moved far out of town to the farm Klipspruit (later called Pimville), south-west of Johannesburg, where the council had erected iron barracks and a few triangular hutments. The rest of them had to build their own shacks. The fire brigade then set the 1600 shacks and shops in Brickfields alight. Thereafter, the area was redeveloped as Newtown. Pimville was next to Kliptown, the oldest Black residential district of Johannesburg and first laid out in 1891, on land which formed part of Klipspruit farm. The future Soweto was to be laid out on Klipspruit and the adjoining farm called Diepkloof.

In the Zuid-Afrikaansche Republiek and the subsequent Transvaal Colony, it was lawful for people of colour to own fixed property. Consequently, the township of Sophiatown was laid out in 1903 and Blacks were encouraged to buy property there. For the same reasons, Alexandra, Gauteng was planned for Black ownership in 1912. The subsequent Natives Land Act of 1913 did not change the situation because it did not apply to land situated within municipal boundaries.

=== Orlando, Moroka and Jabavu ===
In 1923, the Parliament of the Union of South Africa passed the Natives (Urban Areas) Act. The purpose of the Act was to provide for improved conditions of residence for natives in urban areas, to control their ingress into such areas and to restrict their access to intoxicating liquor. The Act required local authorities to provide accommodation for Natives (then the polite term for Africans or Blacks) lawfully employed and resident within the area of their jurisdiction. Pursuant to this Act, the Johannesburg town council formed a Municipal Native Affairs Department in 1927. It bought 1 300 morgen of land on the farm Klipspruit No. 8 and the first houses in what was to become Orlando Location were built there in the latter half of 1930. The township was named after the chairman of the Native Affairs committee, Mr. Edwin Orlando Leake. In the end, some 10,311 houses were built there by the municipality. In addition, it built 4,045 temporary single-room shelters.

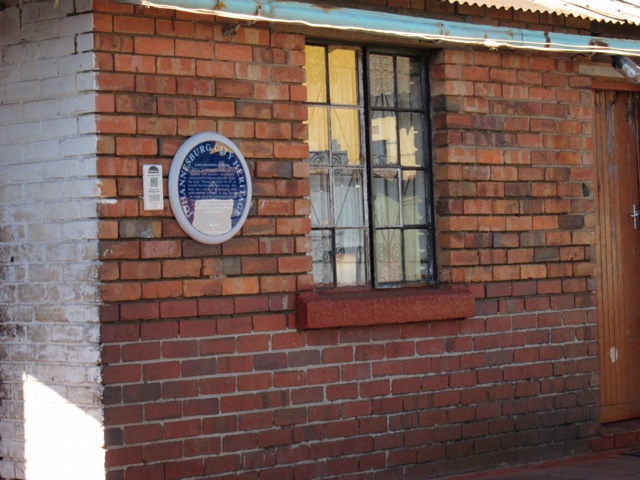
James Mpanza House in Orlando

In about 1934, James Sofasonke Mpanza moved to 957 Pheele Street, Orlando, and lived there for the rest of his life. A year after his arrival in Orlando, he formed his own political party, the Sofasonke Party. He also became very active in the affairs of the Advisory Board for Orlando. Towards the end of World War II, there was an acute shortage of housing for Blacks in Johannesburg. By the end of 1943, the Sofasonke Party advised its members to put up their own squatters' shacks on municipal property. On Saturday 25 March 1944, the squat began. Hundreds of homeless people from Orlando and elsewhere joined Mpanza in marching to a vacant lot in Orlando West and starting a squatters camp. The city council's resistance crumbled. After feverish consultations with the relevant government department, it was agreed that an emergency camp, which could house 991 families, be erected. It was to be called Central Western Jabavu. The next wave of land invasions took place in September 1946. Some 30,000 squatters congregated west of Orlando. Early the next year, the city council proclaimed a new emergency camp. It was called Moroka. 10,000 sites were made available immediately. Moroka became Johannesburg's worst slum area. Residents erected their shanties on plots measuring six metres by six metres. There were only communal bucket-system toilets and very few taps. The camps were meant to be used for a maximum of five years, but when they were eventually demolished in 1955, Moroka and Jabavu housed 89,000 people.

=== Chris Hani Baragwanath Academic Hospital ===
In 1941, the British Government built a military hospital next to the road between Johannesburg and Potchefstroom. The place was to be at the 8th milestone near the old Wayside Inn, owned by a Cornishman called John Albert Baragwanath. It was called The Imperial Military Hospital, Baragwanath. After the war, the Transvaal Provincial Administration bought the hospital for £1 million. On 1 April 1948, the Black section of Johannesburg Hospital (known as Non-European Hospital or NEH) was transferred to Baragwanath Hospital. In 1997, the facility was renamed Chris Hani Baragwanath Academic Hospital after former General Secretary of the South African Communist Party, Chris Hani.

=== Apartheid ===
The National Party won the general election of 1948 and formed a new government. The party's policy was called apartheid, the Afrikaans word meaning separateness. They thought they could separate the various racial groups in South Africa. In those days, the Johannesburg City Council did not support the National Party. The city council and the central government competed to control the Black townships of Johannesburg.

==== 1948 to 1976 ====
Following the election of the new government, some 7,000 new houses were built in the first two or three years, but very little was done thereafter. In 1952, there was a breakthrough. Firstly, the Council for Scientific and Industrial Research came up with a standard design for low-cost, four-roomed, forty-square-metre houses. In 1951, the Parliament passed the Building Workers Act, which permitted Blacks to be trained as artisans in the building trade. In 1952, it passed the Bantu Services Levy Act, which imposed a levy on employers of African workers and the levy was used to finance basic services in Black townships. In 1954, the City Council built 5,100 houses in Jabavu and 1,450 in Mofolo.

The city council's pride and joy was its economic scheme known as Dube Village. It was intended "primarily for the thoroughly urbanised and economically advanced Native". Stands, varying in size from fifty by hundred feet to forty by 70 feet, were made available on a thirty-year leasehold tenure. Tenants could erect their own dwellings in conformity with approved plans.

In June 1955, Kliptown was the home of an unprecedented Congress of the People, which adopted the Freedom Charter.

From the onset, the Apartheid government purposed Soweto to house the bulk of the labour force which was needed by Johannesburg. Africans used to live in areas surrounding the city, so the authorities felt it would be more expedient to concentrate black workers in one district that could be easily controlled.

The new sub-economic townships took off in 1956, when Tladi, Zondi, Dhlamini, Chiawelo and Senoane were laid out providing 28,888 people with accommodation. Jabulani, Phiri and Naledi followed the next year. Sir Ernest Oppenheimer arranged a loan of £3 million from the mining industry, which allowed an additional 14,000 houses to be built. It was decided to divide Soweto into various language groups. Naledi, Mapetla, Tladi, Moletsane and Phiri were for Sotho- and Tswana-speaking people. Chiawelo for Tsonga and Venda. Dlamini Senaoane, Zola, Zondi, Jabulani, Emdeni and White City were for Zulus and Xhosas.

The central government was busy with its own agenda. The presence of Blacks with freehold title to land among Johannesburg's White suburbs irked them. In 1954, Parliament passed the Native Resettlement Act, which permitted the government to remove Blacks from suburbs like Sophiatown, Martindale, Newclare and Western Native Township. Between 1956 and 1960, they built 23,695 houses in Meadowlands and Diepkloof to accommodate the evicted persons. By 1960, the removals were more-or-less complete.

In 1959, the city council launched a competition to find a collective name for all the townships south-west of the city's centre. It was only in 1963 that the city council decided to adopt the name Soweto as the collective name. The name Soweto was officially endorsed by the municipalities' authorities only in 1963 after a special committee had considered various names. The apartheid government's intention was for Soweto to house black people who were working for Johannesburg. Other names considered included "apartheid Townships" and "Verwoerdstad".

In 1971, Parliament passed the Black Affairs Administration Act, No. 45 of 1971. In terms of this Act, the central government appointed the West Rand Administration Board to take over the powers and obligations of the Johannesburg City Council in respect of Soweto. As chairman of the board it appointed Manie Mulder, a political appointment of a person who had no experience of the administration of native affairs. Manie Mulder's most famous quote was given to the Rand Daily Mail in May 1976: "The broad masses of Soweto are perfectly content, perfectly happy. Black-White relationships at present are as healthy as can be. There is no danger whatever of a blow-up in Soweto."

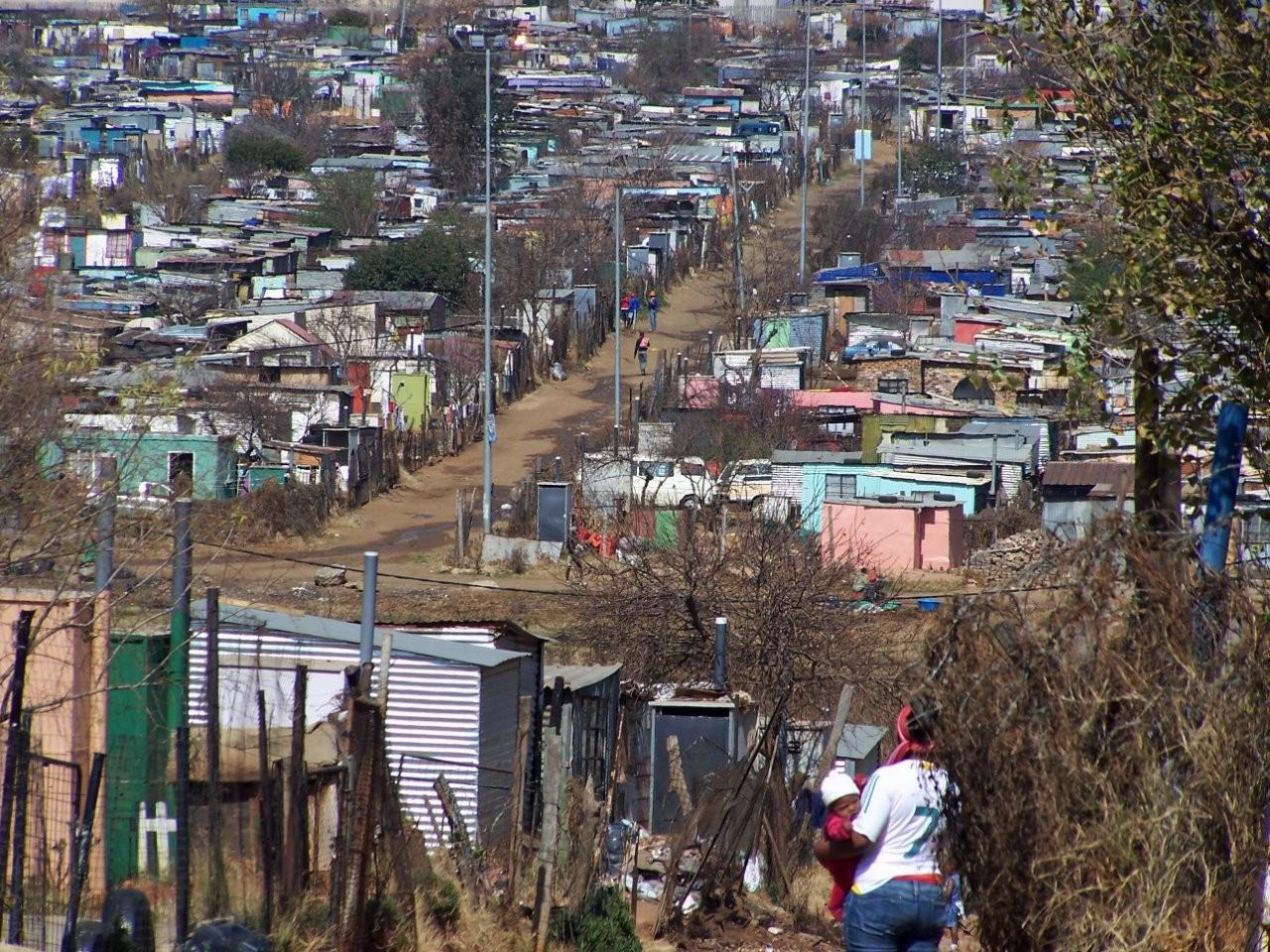
Soweto housing (c. 2009)

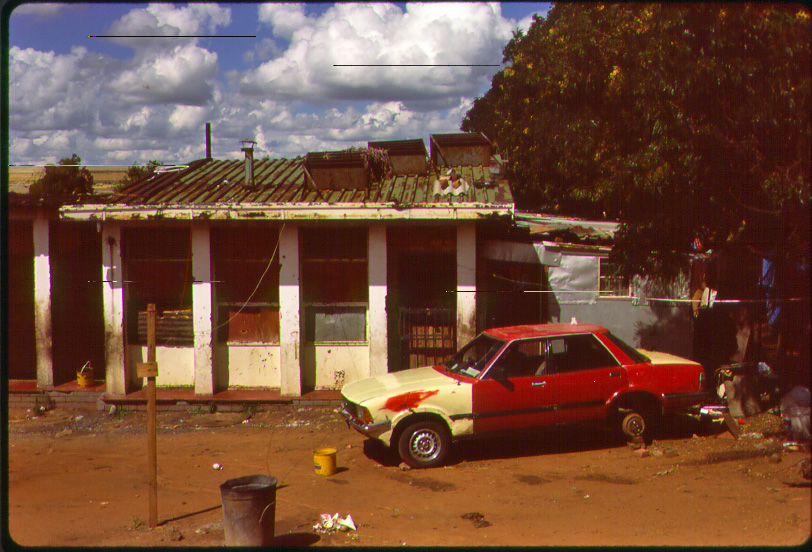
House in Soweto, December 1995

==== Soweto uprising ====
Soweto came to the world's attention on 16 June 1976 with the Soweto uprising, when mass protests erupted over the government's policy to enforce education in Afrikaans rather than their native language. Police opened fire in Orlando West on 10,000 students marching from Naledi High School to Orlando Stadium. The rioting continued and 23 people died on the first day in Soweto, 21 of whom were black, including the minor Hector Pieterson, as well as two white people, including Melville Edelstein, a lifelong humanitarian.

The impact of the Soweto protests reverberated through the country and across the world. In their aftermath, economic and cultural sanctions were introduced from abroad. Political activists left the country to train for guerrilla resistance. Soweto and other townships became the stage for violent state repression. Since 1991, this date and the schoolchildren have been commemorated by the International Day of the African Child.

==== Aftermath ====
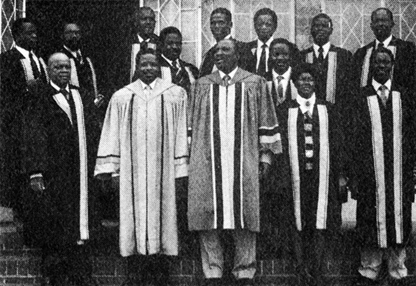
Diepmeadow Town Council, Greater Soweto

In response, the apartheid state started providing electricity to more Soweto homes, yet phased out financial support for building additional housing. Soweto became an independent municipality with elected black councilors in 1983, in line with the Black Local Authorities Act. Previously, the townships were governed by the Johannesburg council, but from the 1970s, the state took control.

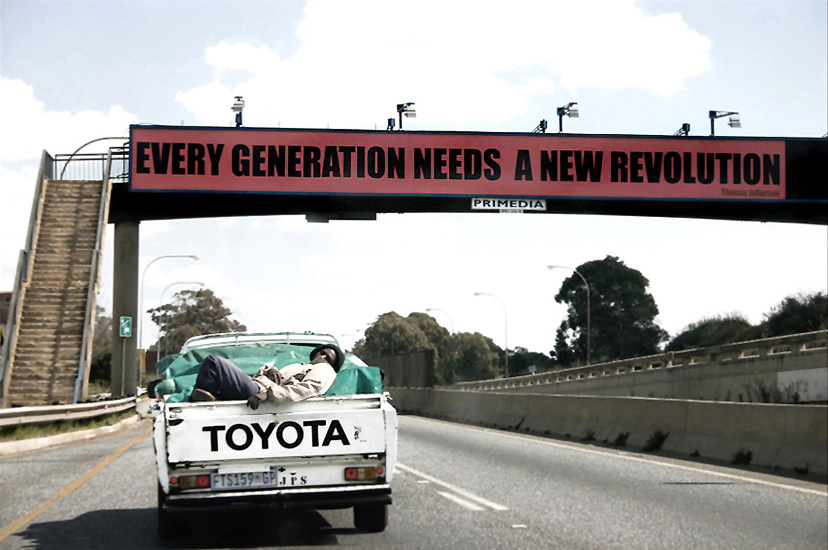
A man takes a nap while riding in the bed of a pickup truck in Soweto, South Africa, Freedom Day, 2006.

Black African councilors were not provided by the apartheid state with the finances to address housing and infrastructural problems. Township residents opposed the black councilors as puppet collaborators who personally benefited financially from an oppressive regime. Resistance was spurred by the exclusion of blacks from the newly formed tricameral Parliament (which did include Whites, Indians and Coloreds). Municipal elections in black, coloured, and Indian areas were subsequently widely boycotted, returning extremely low voting figures for years. Popular resistance to state structures dates back to the Advisory Boards (1950) that co-opted black residents to advise whites who managed the townships.

=== Further popular resistance: incorporation into the City ===
In Soweto, popular resistance to apartheid emerged in various forms during the 1980s. Educational and economic boycotts were initiated, and student bodies were organized. Street committees were formed, and civic organizations were established as alternatives to state-imposed structures. One of the most well-known "civics" was Soweto's Committee of Ten, started in 1978 in the offices of The Bantu World newspaper. Such actions were strengthened by the call issued by African National Congress's 1985 Kabwe congress in Zambia to make South Africa ungovernable. As the state forbade public gatherings, church buildings like Regina Mundi were sometimes used for political gatherings.

In 1995, Soweto became part of the Southern Metropolitan Transitional Local Council, and in 2002, was incorporated into the City of Johannesburg. A series of bombings occurred in 2002. The right-wing extremist group, Boeremag claimed responsibility for the attacks that damaged buildings, railway lines, and killed one person. In 2022, 15 people were killed in a mass shooting at a bar.

== Demographics ==
Soweto's population is predominantly black and the most common first language is Zulu.

=== Census 2011 ===
- Area: 200.03 square kilometres (77.23 sq mi)
- Population: 1,271,628: 6,357.29 inhabitants per square kilometre (16,465.3/sq mi)
- Households: 355,331: 1,776.42 per square kilometre (4,600.9/sq mi)

Gender	Population	%
Female	640,588	50.38
Male	631,040	49.62

Race	Population	%
Black	1,253,037	98.54
White	1,421	0.11
Coloured	13,079	1.03
Asian	1,418	0.11
Other	2,674	0.21

First language	Population	%
isiZulu	350,940	40.87
isiXhosa	88,474	10.3
Afrikaans	5,639	0.66
Sesotho sa Leboa	41,179	4.8
Setswana	106,419	12.39
English	3,047	0.35
Sesotho	157,263	18.32
Xitsonga	62,157	7.24
siSwati	8,696	1.01
Tshivenda	29,498	3.44
isiNdebele	2,801	0.33
Other	2,531	0.29

=== Census 2001 ===
- Area: 106.44 square kilometres (41.10 sq mi)
- Population: 858,644: 8,066.81 inhabitants per square kilometre (20,892.9/sq mi)
- Households: 237,567: 2,231.9 per square kilometre (5,781/sq mi)

Gender	Population	%
Female	437,268	50.93
Male	421,376	49.07

Race	Population	%
Black	852,649	99.3
White	325	0.04
Coloured	5,472	0.64
Asian	198	0.02

First language	Population	%
IsiZulu	469,873	37.07
IsiXhosa	109,977	8.68
Afrikaans	16,567	1.31
Sepedi	65,215	5.14
Setswana	163,083	12.87
English	29,602	2.34
Sesotho	196,816	15.53
Xitsonga	112,346	8.86
SiSwati	9,292	0.73
Tshivenda	29,498	3.44
IsiNdebele	56,737	4.48
Other	14,334	1.13

== Cityscape ==
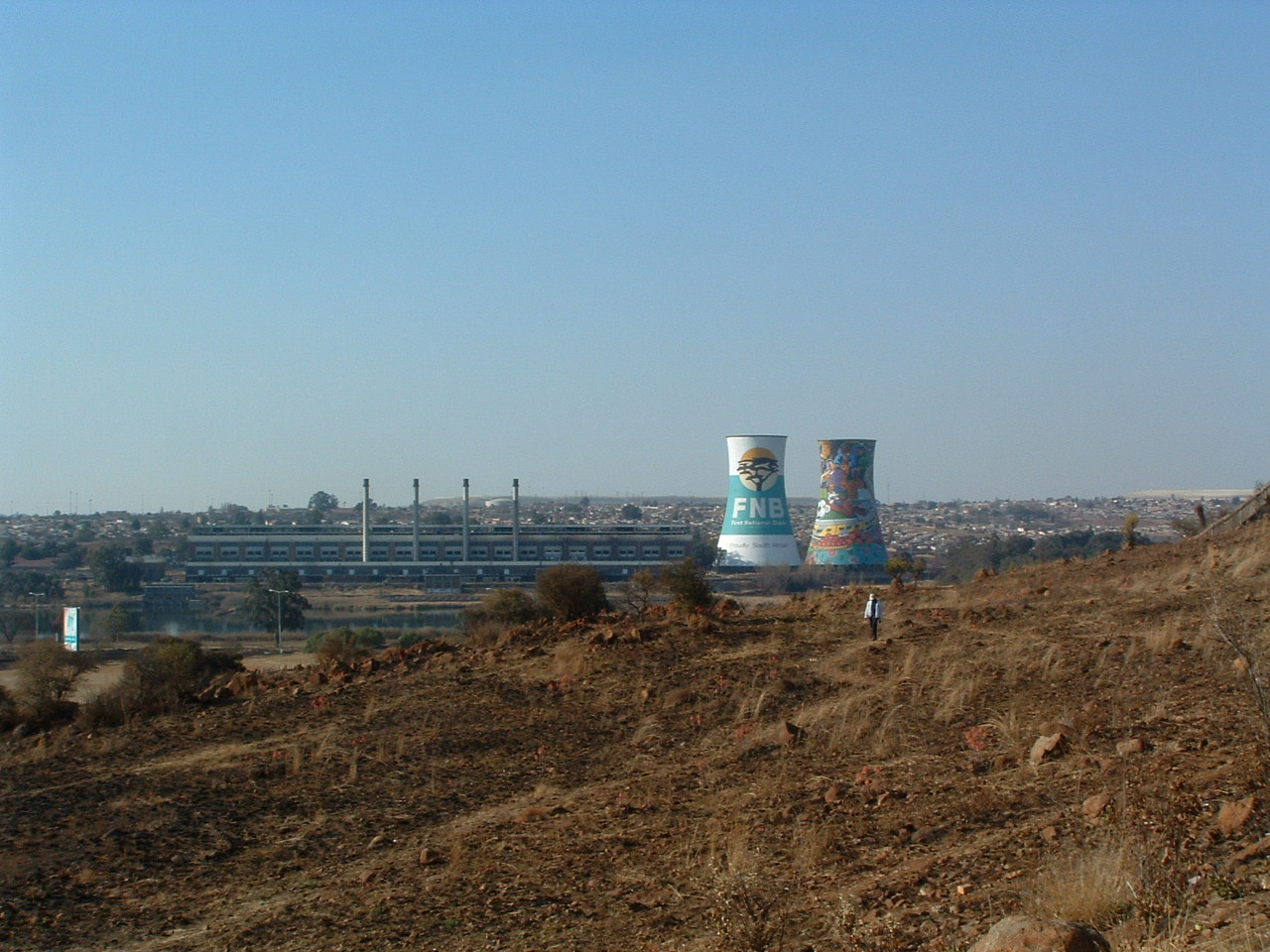
Orlando Power Station Cooling Towers

=== Landmarks ===
Soweto landmarks include:

- Chris Hani Baragwanath Academic Hospital, Diepkloof
- Freedom Towers
- Mandela House
- Orlando Towers
- Regina Mundi, Rockville
- SAAF 1723, a decommissioned Avro Shackleton of the South African Air Force is on static display on the roof of Vic's Viking Garage, a service station on the Golden Highway
- Soweto Wall of Fame
- Tutu House
- Vilakazi Street
- Walter Sisulu Square, Kliptown

== Climate ==
Köppen-Geiger climate classification system classifies its climate as subtropical highland (Cwb).

Climate data for Soweto
Month	Jan	Feb	Mar	Apr	May	Jun	Jul	Aug	Sep	Oct	Nov	Dec	Year
Mean daily maximum °C (°F)	26.4 (79.5)	25.8 (78.4)	24.7 (76.5)	22.1 (71.8)	19.6 (67.3)	16.9 (62.4)	17.3 (63.1)	20.3 (68.5)	23.4 (74.1)	25 (77)	25.3 (77.5)	26.1 (79.0)	22.7 (72.9)
Daily mean °C (°F)	20.4 (68.7)	19.8 (67.6)	18.5 (65.3)	15.5 (59.9)	12.1 (53.8)	9 (48)	9.2 (48.6)	12.1 (53.8)	15.7 (60.3)	18 (64)	19 (66)	19.9 (67.8)	15.8 (60.3)
Mean daily minimum °C (°F)	14.4 (57.9)	13.9 (57.0)	12.3 (54.1)	8.9 (48.0)	4.6 (40.3)	1.2 (34.2)	1.2 (34.2)	4 (39)	8 (46)	11 (52)	12.7 (54.9)	13.7 (56.7)	8.8 (47.9)
Average precipitation mm (inches)	136 (5.4)	101 (4.0)	84 (3.3)	63 (2.5)	20 (0.8)	8 (0.3)	7 (0.3)	7 (0.3)	24 (0.9)	73 (2.9)	112 (4.4)	115 (4.5)	750 (29.6)
Source: Climate-Data.org, altitude: 1667m

== Transport ==
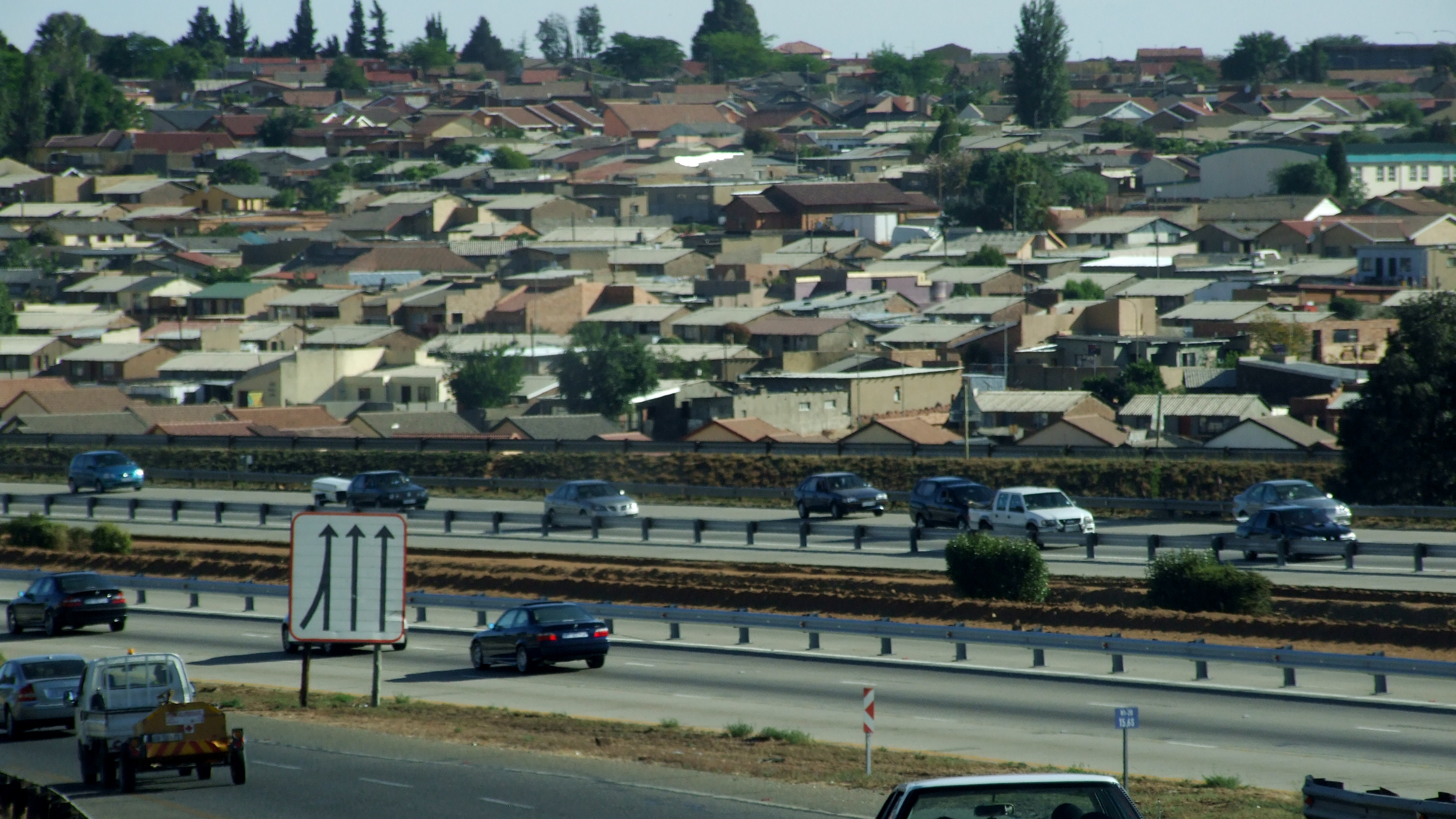
The N1 next to Soweto

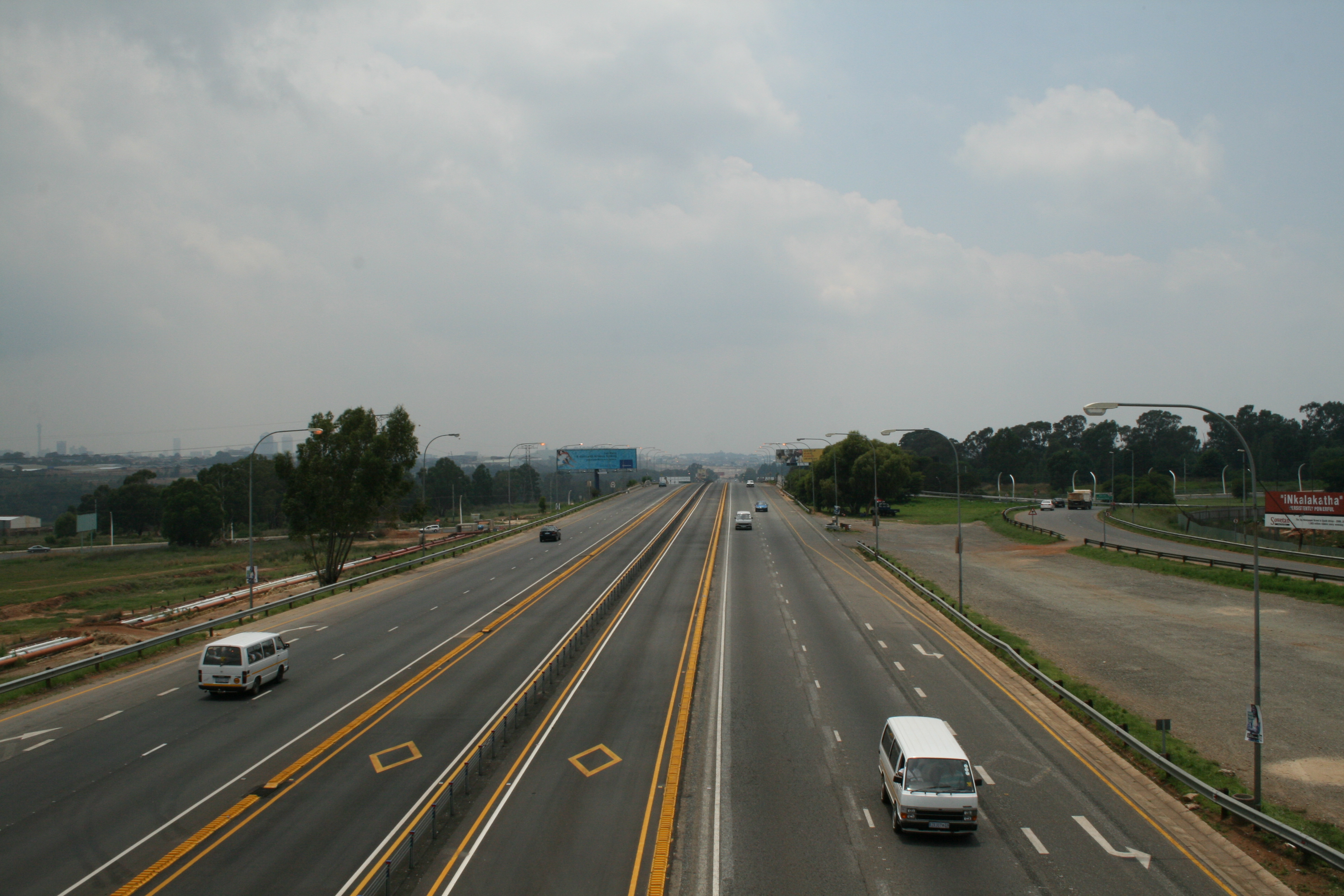
The Soweto Highway with dedicated taxiways

As a policy of economic apartheid, the suburb was not historically allowed to create employment centres within the area, so almost all of its residents are commuters to other parts of the city.

=== Rail ===
Metrorail operates commuter trains between Soweto and central Johannesburg. Soweto train stations are at Naledi, Merafe, Inhlazane, Ikwezi, Dube, Phefeni, Phomolong, Mzimhlophe, New Canada, Mlamlankunzi, Orlando, Nancefield, Kliptown, Tshiawelo and Midway.

=== Road ===
The N1 highway skirts the eastern boundary of Soweto. There is efficient road access for many parts of the region along busy highways to Johannesburg and Roodepoort, but commuters are largely reliant on trains and taxis.

The N12 (named the Moroka Bypass) forms the southern border of Soweto, separating it from Lenasia.

A new section of the N17 has been built, connecting Soweto with Nasrec as a four-lane dual carriageway.

The M70, also known as the Soweto Highway, links Soweto with central Johannesburg via Nasrec and Booysens. This road is multi lane, passes next to Soccer City in Nasrec and has dedicated taxiway lanes from Soweto eastwards to Booysens and Johannesburg Central.

The M68, also known as the Old Potchefstroom Road, links Soweto with Johannesburg South.

A major thoroughfare through the south-eastern part of Soweto (Eldorado Park) is the R553 Golden Highway. It provides access to the N1, N12 and M1 highways.

Minibus taxis are a popular form of transport. In 2000 it was estimated that around 2000 minibus taxis operated from the Baragwanath taxi rank alone.

A Bus rapid transit system, Rea Vaya, provides transport for around 16 000 commuters daily.

PUTCO has for many years provided bus commuter services to Soweto residents.

== Housing ==
The area is mostly composed of old "matchbox" houses, or four-room houses built by the government, that were built to provide cheap accommodation for black workers during apartheid. However, there are a few smaller areas where prosperous Sowetans have built houses that are similar in stature to those in more affluent suburbs. Many people who still live in matchbox houses have improved and expanded their homes, and the City Council has enabled the planting of more trees and the improving of parks and green spaces in the area.

Hostels are another prominent physical feature of Soweto. Originally built to house male migrant workers, many have been improved as dwellings for couples and families.

In 1996, the City of Johannesburg Metropolitan Municipality awarded tenders to Conrad Penny and his company Penny Brothers Brokers & Valuers (Pty) Ltd. for the valuation of the whole of Soweto (which at the time consisted of over 325,000 properties) for rating and taxing purpose. This was the single largest valuation ever undertaken in Africa.

== Society and culture ==
=== Media ===
Being part of the urban agglomerations of Gauteng, Soweto shares much of the same media as the rest of Gauteng province. There are however some media sources dedicated to Soweto itself:

- Soweto Online is a geographical-based information-sharing portal.
- Soweto Internet Radio is a digital media network company established in 2008.
- Soweto TV is a community television channel, available on DStv channel 251. The channel is free-to-air in Gauteng province and it also broadcast to South African subscribers on the DStv pay TV service on channel 251. The channel studios are situated on Vilakazi Street, known for being the only street in the world to have the historical residences of two Nobel Prize winners, namely Nelson Mandela and Archbishop Desmond Tutu. Soweto TV programming is mostly Sowetan content as per ICASA's regulations of over 60% local content.
- The Sowetan newspaper has a readership of around 1.6 million.
- Kasibiz Mahala is a free community magazine that promotes local small businesses established in 2012.

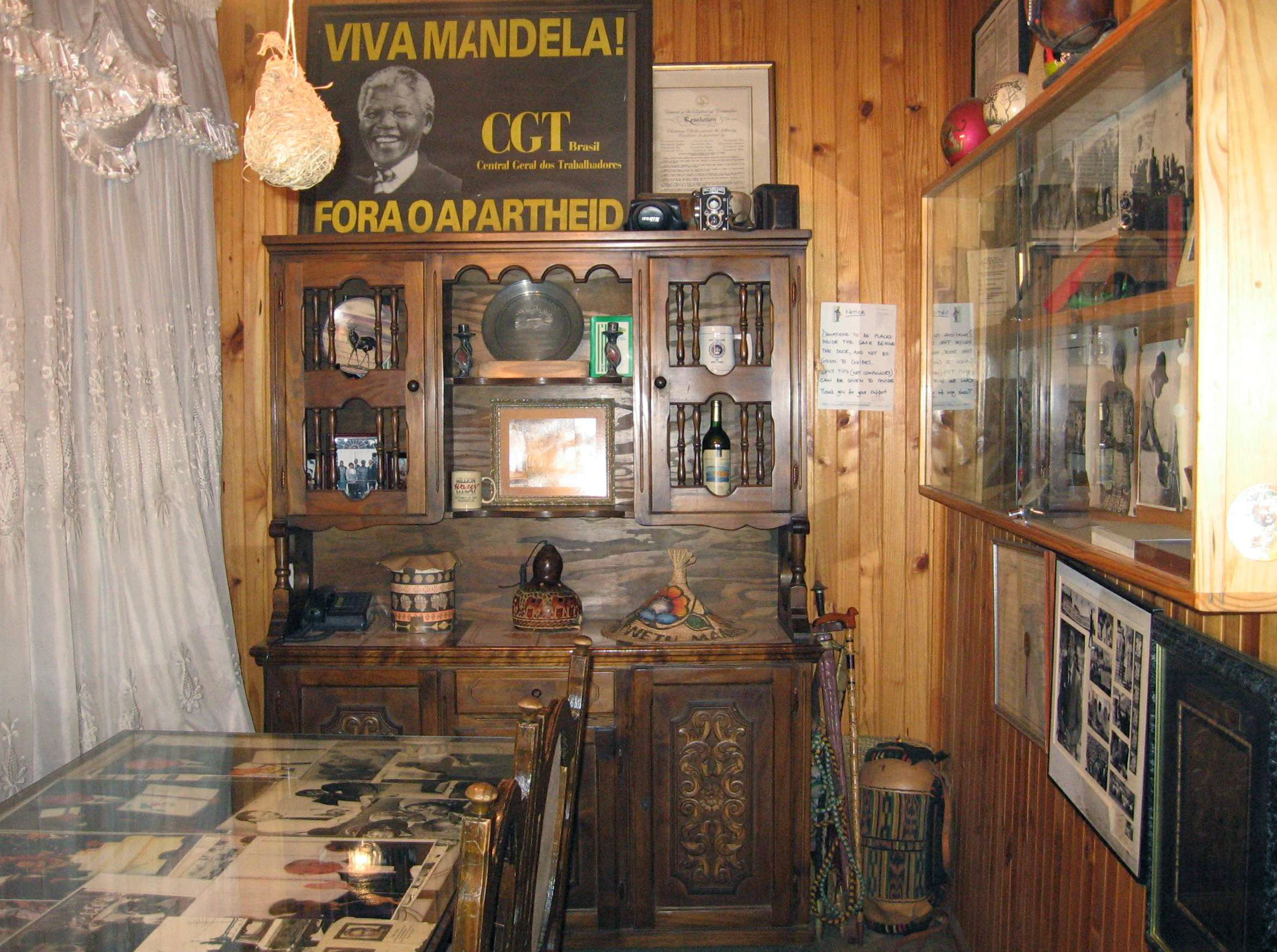
Nelson Mandela National Museum

=== Museums, monuments and memorials ===
- Hector Pieterson Museum, Orlando West
- Nelson Mandela National Museum, Orlando West
- Regina Mundi Catholic Church, Rockville
- Tsietsi Mashinini Memorial Arc Museum, Central Western Jabavu
- American rapper, Tupac Shakur's ashes, final resting place.

=== Music ===
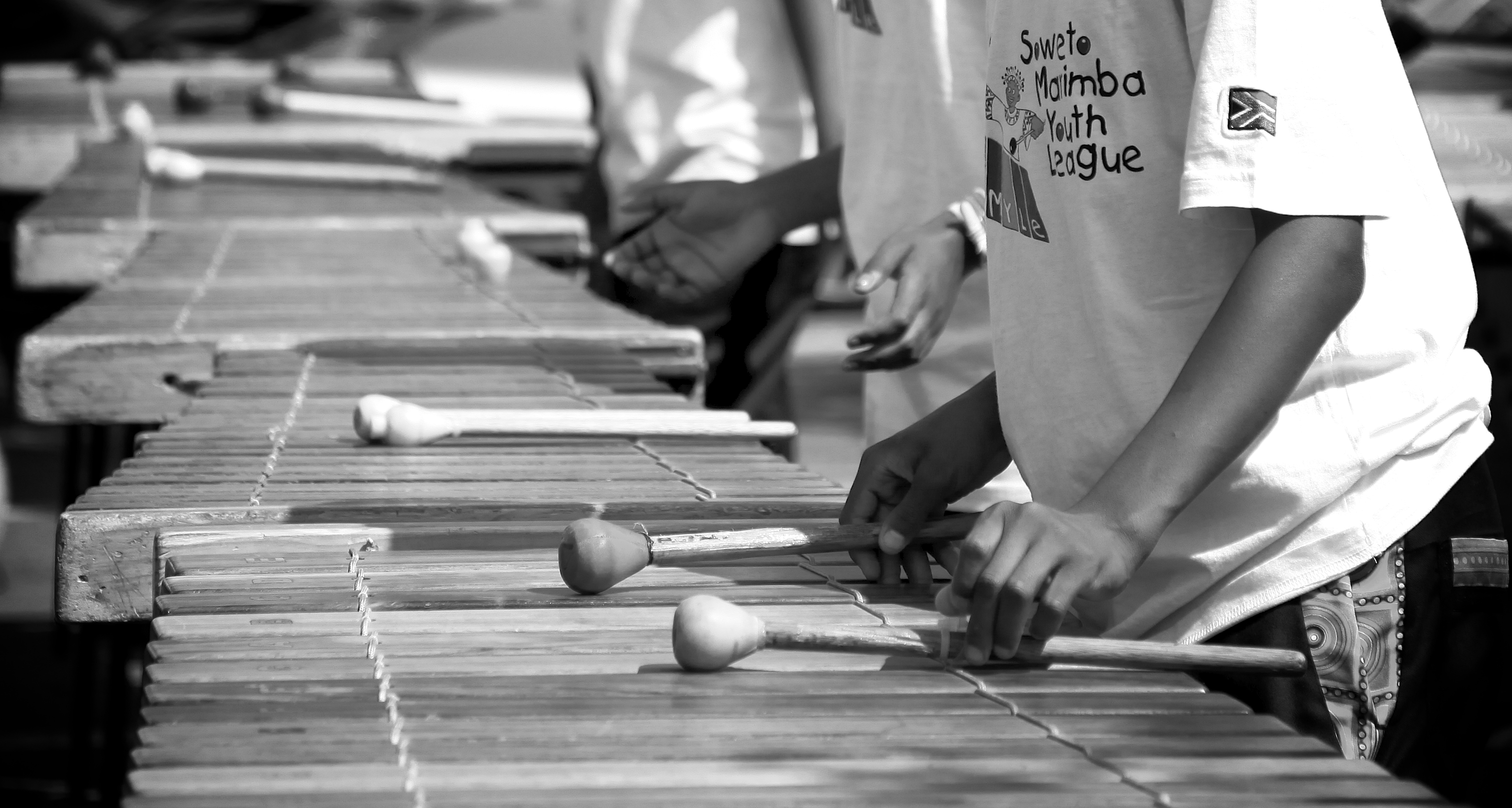
The Soweto Marimba Youth League during a public performance

Soweto is credited as one of the founding places for Kwaito and Kasi rap, which is a style of hip hop specific to South Africa. This form of music, which combined many elements of house music, American hip-hop, and traditional African music, became a strong force amongst black South Africans.

Early Career

The experiences of other developing nations were examined at the Soweto entrepreneurship conference, which looked for ways to help turn the economic tide in townships. SOWETO'S entrepreneurs gathered at the University of Johannesburg Soweto Campus on 13 and 14 April to engage with experts from all over the globe about how to enhance skills and value-add in township economies. The restrictions on economic activities were lifted in 1977, spurring the growth of the taxi industry as an alternative to Soweto's inadequate bus and train transport systems. In 1994 Sowetans earned on average almost six and a half times less than their counterparts in wealthier areas of Johannesburg (1994 estimates). Sowetans contribute less than 2% to Johannesburg's rates Some Sowetans remain impoverished, and others live in shanty towns with little or no services. About 85% of Kliptown comprises informal housing. The Soweto Electricity Crisis Committee argues that Soweto's poor are unable to pay for electricity. The committee believes that the South African government's privatization drives will worsen the situation. Research showed that 62% of residents in Orlando East and Pimville were unemployed or pensioners. There have been signs recently indicating economic improvement. The Johannesburg City Council began to provide more street lights and to pave roads. Private initiatives to tap Sowetans' combined spending power of R4.3 billion were also planned, including the construction of Protea Mall, Jabulani Mall, and the development of Maponya Mall, an upmarket hotel in Kliptown, and the Orlando Ekhaya entertainment center. Soweto has also become a Centre for nightlife and culture.

Well-known artists from Soweto, besides those mentioned above, include:

- The Soweto Gospel Choir. Songs and interview from NPR's All Things Considered, Soweto Gospel Choir: 'Voices from Heaven', 4 February 2005.
- Soweto String Quartet
- Soweto Melodic Voices, the youth choir selected to sing at the 2009 Confederations Cup. It has built its name in UK on Fringe festival in Edinburgh Scotland.

=== Sport ===
- Soweto is home to two football teams that play for the top South African football league: the Kaizer Chiefs and the Moroka Swallows. The Orlando Pirates originated from Soweto but moved to Houghton, however still play the Original Soweto Derby against the Swallows. The Chiefs and the Pirates feud in the rivalry known as the Soweto derby, widely recognised as one of the biggest in Africa.
- The Soweto Open tennis tournament, part of the Challenger Tour is annually hosted in Soweto.
- The annual Soweto marathon is run over a 42.2-kilometre (26.2 mi) course through Soweto.
- The Soweto Panthers are the township's representative in the Basketball National League.

=== Festivals ===
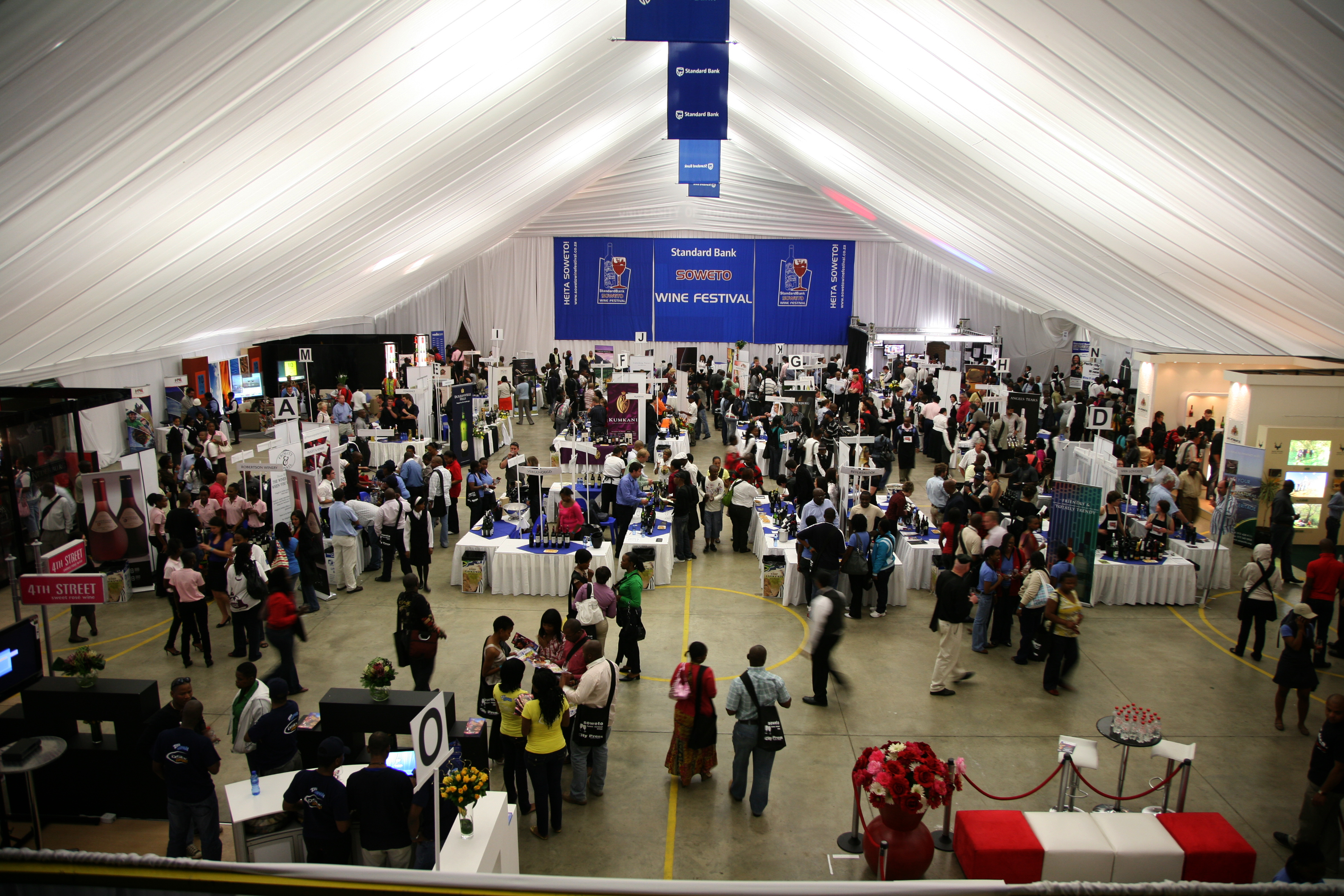
The Soweto Wine Festival 2009

The Soweto Wine Festival was started in 2004. The three-night festival is hosted at the University of Johannesburg's Soweto Campus on Chris Hani Road in the first weekend of September. Organised by the Cape Wine Academy, the festival attracts over 6000 wine enthusiasts, over 100 of South Africa's finest wineries and well over 900 fine wines.

Soweto Pride, an annual pride parade, is held in Soweto every year, on the last Saturday of September. The inaugural Pride was in 2004. The parade aims to celebrate black lesbian, queer and trans women plus non-binary people, and offer them space to voice issues affecting them.

=== Stadiums ===
- FNB Stadium, South Africa's largest stadium; home ground of both the national team and the Kaizer Chiefs
- Eldorado Park Stadium
- Dobsonville Stadium, home ground of Moroka Swallows
- Jabavu Stadium
- Noordgesig Stadium
- Orlando Stadium, home ground of Orlando Pirates
- Meadowlands Stadium

=== Awards ===
The Soweto Awards, which will become an annual event, honours those who have their roots in Soweto. Former president Nelson Mandela received the Life Time Award from the first Soweto Awards in Johannesburg on 25 February 2001. The Legends Awards went to Gibson Kente, the "godfather" of township theatre, Felicia Mabuza-Suttle, a talk show host, Aggrey Klaaste, editor of the Sowetan newspaper and Winnie Madikizela-Mandela, MP and African National Congress Women's League president.

== Suburbs ==
By 2003, the Greater Soweto area consisted of 87 townships grouped together into Administrative Regions 6 and 10 of Johannesburg.

Estimates of how many residential areas make up Soweto itself vary widely. Some counts say that Soweto comprises 29 townships, whilst others find 34. The differences may be due to confusion arising from the merger of adjoining townships (such as Lenasia and Eldorado Park) with those of Soweto into Regions 6 and 10. The total number also depends on whether the various "extensions" and "zones" are counted separately, or as part of one main suburb. The 2003 Regional Spatial Development Framework arrived at 87 names by counting various extensions (e.g. Chiawelo's 5) and zones (e.g. Pimville's 7) separately. The City of Johannesburg's website groups the zones and extensions together to arrive at 32, but omits Noordgesig and Mmesi Park.

The list below provides the dates when some of Soweto's townships were established, along with the probable origins or meanings of their names, where available:

Suburbs of Soweto
Name	Established	Origin of name
Braamfischerville		
Tshiawelo	1956	"Place of Rest" (Venda)
Diepkloof	1959	
Dlamini	1956	Unknown, Nguni family name. Michael Mabaso also comes from here. This is a township with a working class population who travel by train to work.
Dobsonville		including Dobsonville Gardens
Doornkop		"Hill of Thorns" (Afrikaans)
Dube	1948	Named for John Langalibalele Dube (1871–1946), educator, newspaper founder, and the first ANC president (1912–17)
Emdeni	1958	"A border, last township before Mogale City (then Krugersdorp Municipality)" (Xhosa), including extensions
Greenvillage
Jabavu	1948	Named after Davidson Don Tengo Jabavu (1885–1959), educator and author
Jabulani	1956	"Rejoice" (Zulu)
Klipspruit	1904	"Rocky Stream" (Afrikaans), originally a farm.
Kliptown		"Rocky Town", constructed from Afrikaans for rock (klip), and the English word "town".
Lakeside		
Mapetla	1956	Someone who is angry (Setswana)
Meadowlands		Also nicknamed "Ndofaya"
Mmesi Park		Sesotho name for somebody who burns things on fire
Mofolo	1954	Named for Thomas Mofolo (1876–1948), Sesotho author, translator, and educator
Molapo	1956	Name of a Basotho tribe, Sesotho name for a small ravine/stream
Moletsane	1956	Name of a Bataung chief, (Bataung is a Basotho clan named after the lion, 'tau')
Moroka	1946	Named for Dr James Sebe Moroka (1891–1985), later ANC president (1949–52) during the 1952 Defiance Campaign
Naledi	1956	"Star" (Sotho/Pedi/Tswana), originally Mkizi
Noordgesig		"North View" (Afrikaans)
Orlando	1932	Named for Edwin Orlando Leake (1860–1935), chairman of the Non-European Affairs Department (1930–31), Johannesburg mayor (1925–26)
Phefeni		
Phiri	1956	"Hyena" (Sotho/Tswana)
Pimville	1934	Named for James Howard Pim, councillor (1903–07), Quaker, philanthropist, and patron of Fort Hare Native College; originally part of Klipspruit
Power Park		In the vicinity of the power station
Protea Glen		Unknown (The protea is South Africa's national flower)
Protea North		
Protea South		
Senaoane	1958	Named for Solomon G Senaoane (−1942), first sports organiser in the Non-European Affairs Department
Tladi	1956	"Lightning" (Northern Sotho)
Zola	1956	"Calm" (Zulu/Xhosa)
Zondi	1956	Unknown family name (Zulu)

Other Soweto townships include Phomolong and Snake Park.

== Economy ==
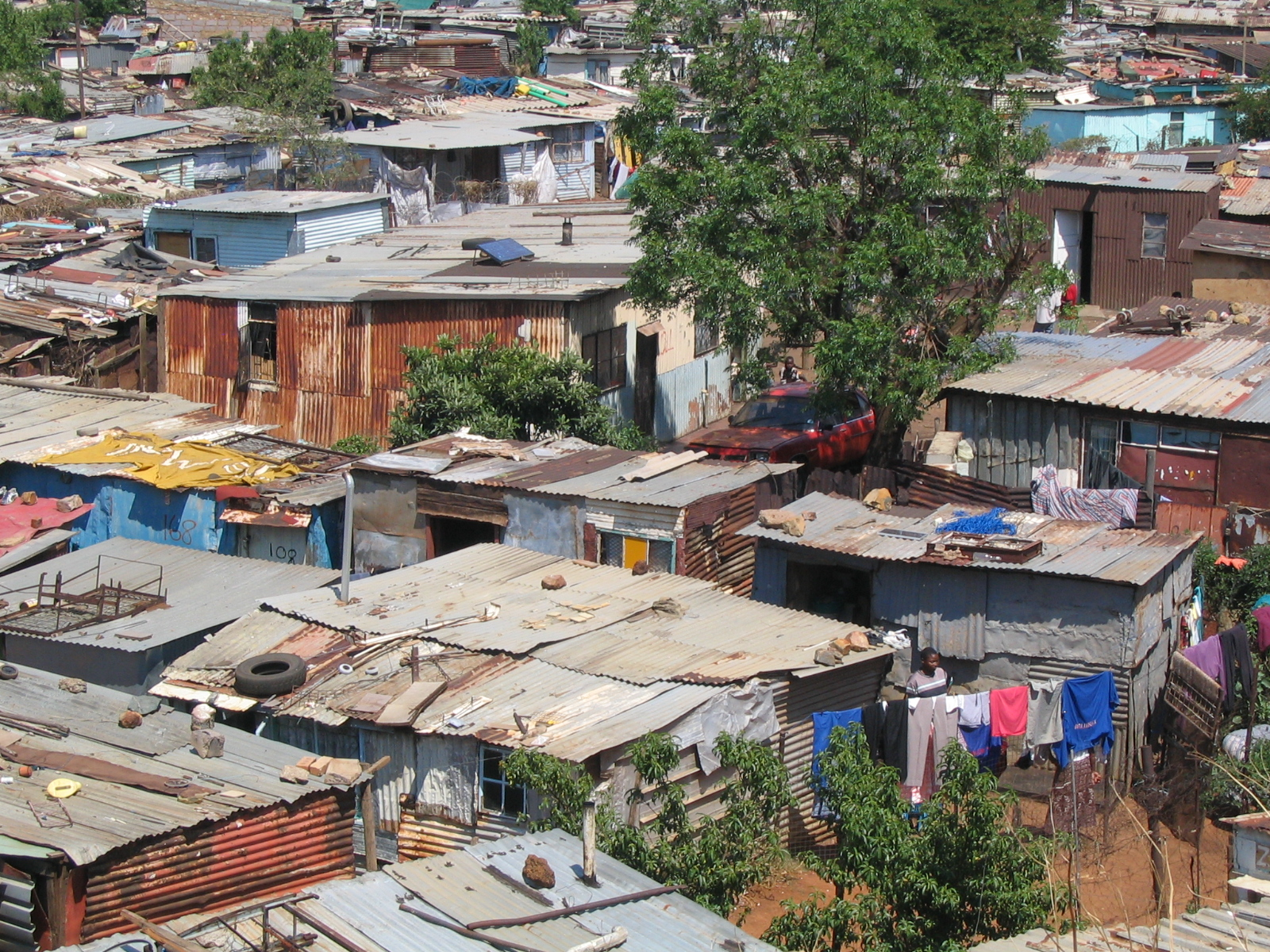
Slums, Soweto

Many parts of Soweto rank among the poorest in Johannesburg, although individual townships tend to have a mix of wealthier and poorer residents. In general, households in the outlying areas to the northwest and southeast have lower incomes, while those in southwestern areas tend to have higher incomes.

The economic development of Soweto was severely curtailed by the apartheid state, which provided very limited infrastructure and prevented residents from creating their own businesses. Roads remained unpaved, and many residents had to share one tap between four houses, for example. Soweto was meant to exist only as a dormitory town for black Africans who worked in white houses, factories, and industries. The 1957 Natives (Urban Areas) Consolidation Act and its predecessors restricted residents between 1923 and 1976 to seven self-employment categories in Soweto itself. Sowetans could operate general shops, butcheries, eating houses, sell milk or vegetables, or hawk goods. The overall number of such enterprises at any time were strictly controlled. As a result, informal trading developed outside the legally-recognized activities.

By 1976, Soweto had only two cinemas and two hotels, and 83% of houses had electricity. Up to 93% of residents had no running water. Using fire for cooking and heating resulted in respiratory problems that contributed to high infant mortality rates (54 per 1,000 compared to 18 for whites, 1976 figures.

The restrictions on economic activities were lifted in 1977, spurring the growth of the taxi industry as an alternative to Soweto's inadequate bus and train transport systems.

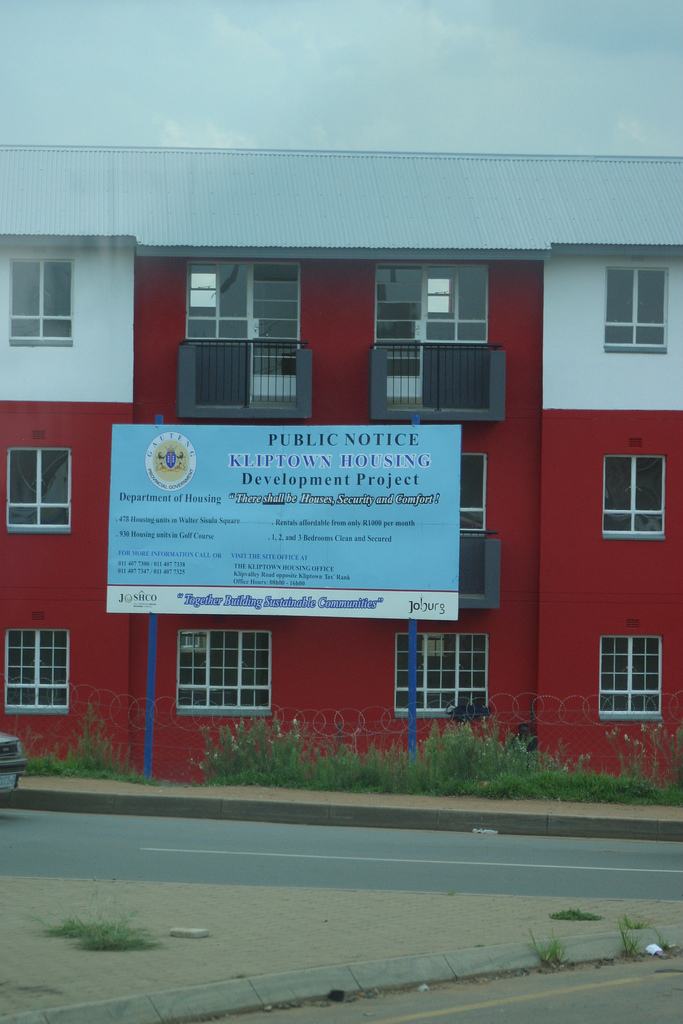
Housing development project, Kliptown

In 1994, Sowetans earned on average almost six and a half times less than their counterparts in wealthier areas of Johannesburg (1994 estimates). Sowetans contribute less than 2% to Johannesburg's rates. Some Sowetans remain impoverished, and others live in shanty towns with little or no services. About 85% of Kliptown comprises informal housing. The Soweto Electricity Crisis Committee argues that Soweto's poor are unable to pay for electricity. The committee believes that the South African government's privatization drives will worsen the situation. Research showed that 62% of residents in Orlando East and Pimville were unemployed or pensioners.

There have been signs recently indicating economic improvement. The Johannesburg City Council began to provide more street lights and to pave roads. Private initiatives to tap Sowetans' combined spending power of R4.3 billion were also planned, including the construction of Protea Mall, Jabulani Mall, the development of Maponya Mall, an upmarket hotel in Kliptown, and the Orlando Ekhaya entertainment centre. Soweto has also become a centre for nightlife and culture.

== In popular culture ==
=== Films ===
The 1976 uprising is depicted in the film A Dry White Season (1989), starring Donald Sutherland, Marlon Brando, and Susan Sarandon, who portray white South Africans pursuing justice for the deaths of black Soweto residents which followed the demonstrations.

The American film Stander (2003) portrays the story of Andre Stander, a rogue South African police Captain who rebelled against the corruption of South Africa under apartheid by becoming a bank robber. The Soweto uprising are depicted as Stander's breaking point in the film.

Sara Blecher and Rimi Raphoto's popular documentary, Surfing Soweto (2006), addresses the phenomenon of young kids "surfing" on the roofs of Soweto trains and the social problem this represents.

The film District 9 (2009) was shot in Tshiawelo, Soweto. The plot involves a species of aliens who arrive on Earth in a starving and helpless condition, seeking aid. The originally benign attempts to aid them turn increasingly oppressive due to the overwhelming numbers of aliens and the cost of maintaining them, and to increasing xenophobia on the part of humans who treat the intelligent and sophisticated aliens like animals while taking advantage of them for personal and corporate gain. The aliens are housed in shacks in a slum-like concentration camp called "District 9", which is in fact modern-day Soweto; an attempt to relocate the aliens to another camp leads to violence and a wholesale slaughter by South African mercenary security forces (a reference to historical events in "District Six", Cape Town, a mostly Coloured neighborhood subjected to forced segregation during the apartheid years). The parallels to South Africa under apartheid are both deliberate and obvious, but are not explicitly remarked upon in the film.

Films that include Soweto scenes:

- Tau ya Soweto (2005)
- Sarafina (1992)
- Hijack Stories (2000)

=== Literature ===
The marches by students in Soweto are briefly mentioned in Linzi Glass' novel, Ruby Red, which was nominated for the Carnegie Medal in 2008.

Soweto is also mentioned in Sheila Gordon's novel, Waiting for the Rain (1987).

The main protagonist from the Jonas Jonasson novel The Girl Who Saved the King of Sweden (2013), Nombeko Mayeki was born in 1961 in Soweto. In his first Anthology of Poems titled "In Quiet Realm" South African Soweto Born poet Lawrence Mduduzi Ndlovu dedicated a poem called "Soweto My Everything" to honour the place of his birth.

Trevor Noah, in his autobiographical comedy Born a Crime (2016), describes his early childhood and growing up in Soweto.

=== Music ===
PJ Powers has a song called "Soweto" which appears on her 2023 album Rightfully Mine.

Clarence Carter has a song called "The Girl From Soweto" or "Where did the girl go, from Soweto".

Soweto is mentioned in the song "Burden of Shame" by the British band UB40, on their album Signing Off (1980).

Singer–songwriter Joe Strummer, formerly of the Clash, referenced Soweto in his solo album Streetcore on the song "Arms Aloft", as well as in The Clash's track, "Where You Gonna Go (Soweto)", found on the album London Calling (Legacy Edition).

The UK music duo Mattafix have a song called "Memories Of Soweto" on their album Rhythm & Hymns (2007).

Soweto is mentioned in the anti-apartheid song "Gimme Hope Jo'anna" by Eddy Grant. The line, "While every mother in a black Soweto fears the killing of another son", refers to police brutality during apartheid.

Miriam Makeba has the song: "Soweto Blues".

Dr. Alban's song "Free Up Soweto" was included in the album Look Who's Talking (1994).

The Mexican group Tijuana No! recorded the song "Soweto" for their first album No, in reference to the city and the movements.

"Soweto" is the name of a song by the rap group Hieroglyphics.

The American band Vampire Weekend refers to its own musical style, a blend of indie rock and pop with African influences, as "Upper West Side Soweto", based on the same description of Paul Simon's album Graceland.

"Soweto" is the title of the opening track of the album Joined at the Hip, by Bob James and Kirk Whalum.

Brazilian singer-songwriter Djavan, in his 1987 album Não É Azul, mas É Mar, recorded a song called Soweto. Also this song inspired the naming of Brazilian pagode group Soweto.

The American group the Magnetic Fields mentions Soweto in their song "World Love" on the album 69 Love Songs (1999).

== Notable people ==
=== Native Sowetans ===
Soweto is the birthplace of:

- Yvonne Chaka Chaka (b. 1965), singer, songwriter, actress, entrepreneur, humanitarian and teacher
- Frank Chikane (b. 1951), anti-apartheid activist and lifelong resident
- Lasizwe Dambuza (b. 1998), television personality
- Bonginkosi Dlamini (b. 1977), popularly known as Zola 7, is a South African kwaito musician, actor, writer, TV presenter and poet.
- Lillian Dube (b. 1945), actress,TV presenter
- Morgan Gould (b. 1983), Association footballer playing for Supersport United F.C.
- Thulani Hlatshwayo (b. 1989), Supersport United and South African football player
- Howza (b. 1983), rapper, songwriter and actor
- Jabu Khanyile (1957-2006), musician and lead vocalist from the band Bayete
- Winnie Khumalo (1973–2025), singer and performer
- Abigail Kubeka (b. 1941), singer, songwriter and actress
- Basetsana Kumalo (b. 1974), 1994 Miss South Africa and 1994 Miss World 1st runner-up, television personality, businesswoman, and philanthropist
- Doctor Khumalo (b. 1967),a retired football player who played for Kaizer Chiefs F.C.
- Bakithi Kumalo (b. 1956), bass guitar player
- Jack Lerole (c. 1940 – 2003), musician, famous for penny whistle performance
- Kgosi Letlape (b. 1959), South Africa's first black ophthalmologist
- Lebo M (b. 1964), composer
- Tsakane Valentine Maswanganyi (b.1979), soprano
- Kabelo Mabalane (b. 1976), kwaito musician, songwriter and actor
- Sipho Mabuse (b. 1950), aka Hotstix, musician
- Thuli Madonsela (b. 1962), former Public Protector of South Africa, advocate and law professor
- Arthur Mafokate (b. 1962), kwaito musician and producer
- Teboho MacDonald Mashinini (1957–1990), primary student leader of the June 1976 Soweto uprising, that spread across South Africa
- Mandla Mandela (b. 1974), tribal chief of the Mvezo Traditional Council and the grandson of icon anti-apartheid activist Nelson Mandela
- Zindzi Mandela (1960-2020), South African diplomat and poet, and the daughter of anti-apartheid activists and politicians Nelson Mandela and Winnie Madikizela-Mandela
- Mandoza (1978–2016), kwaito musician
- Mike Mangena (b. 1960), former football player, Soccer analyst
- Richard Maponya (1920–2020), businessman and anti-apartheid activist
- Ephraim Mashaba (b. 1950), football manager and former player
- Khanyi Mbau (b. 1985), actress and television personality, raised in Mofolo
- Bonnie Mbuli (b. 1979), actress
- Letta Mbulu (b. 1942), jazz singer, songwriter
- Somizi Mhlongo (b. 1972), television presenter, radio personality, choreographer, actor and singer
- Andrew Mlangeni (1925–2020), political activist and anti-apartheid campaigner who, along with Nelson Mandela and others, was imprisoned after the Rivonia Trial.
- Portia Modise (b. 1983), footballer
- Teko Modise (b. 1982), a retired football star
- Refilwe Modiselle (b. 1986), model and entertainer
- Jerry Mofokeng (b. 1956), stage and screen actor
- Khotso Motau (b. 1981), boxer, 2004 Olympian
- Kaizer Motaung (b. 16 October 1944), founder and chairman of Kaizer Chiefs Football Club
- Kamo Mphela (b. 1999), singer & dancer
- Sophie Ndaba (b. 1973), actress
- Themba Ndaba (b. 1965), actor
- Duma Ndlovu (b. 1954), poet, filmmaker, producer, journalist and playwright
- Trevor Noah (b. 1984), comedian, television and radio host and actor, host of The Daily Show
- Nandi Nyembe (1950–2025), actress
- Khabonina Qubeka (born 1981), actress, TV presenter, dancer
- Lucas Radebe (b. 1969), a retired Leeds United and national team captain
- Cyril Ramaphosa (b. 1952), lawyer, trade union leader, activist, politician and businessman, President of South Africa
- Manaka Ranaka (b. 1979), Actress known for playing her starring role as Lucy Diale for long-standing soap opera Generations: The Legacy.
- Dineo Ranaka (b. 1983) radio and television presenter, actress, DJ and TV Producer)
- Thulani Serero (b. 1990), footballer
- Thembi Seete (b. 1977), actress, singer, rapper, television presenter and model.
- Tokyo Sexwale (b. 1953), businessman and former politician, anti-apartheid activist, and political prisoner
- Jomo Sono (b. 1955), star football player, later club owner and coach
- Samthing Soweto (b. 1988), musician
- Siphiwe Tshabalala (b. 1984), footballer playing for Kaizer Chiefs Football Club.
- Dingaan Thobela (1966–2024), former professional boxer, a former two-time lightweight world champion and a former super middleweight world champion, known as the Rose of Soweto
- Mary Twala (c. 1939 – 2020), actress, mother of Somizi Mhlongo
- Sello Chicco Twala (b. 1963), musician and producer
- Zodwa Wabantu (b. 1985), socialite and dancer
- Benedict Vilakazi (footballer) (b. 1982), footballer
- Arthur Zwane (b. 1973), former football player, football coach
- Chidimma Adetshina (b. 2001), Miss South Africa 2024 finalist, Miss Universe Nigeria 2024, Miss Universe 2024 1st Runner-Up

=== Other residents ===
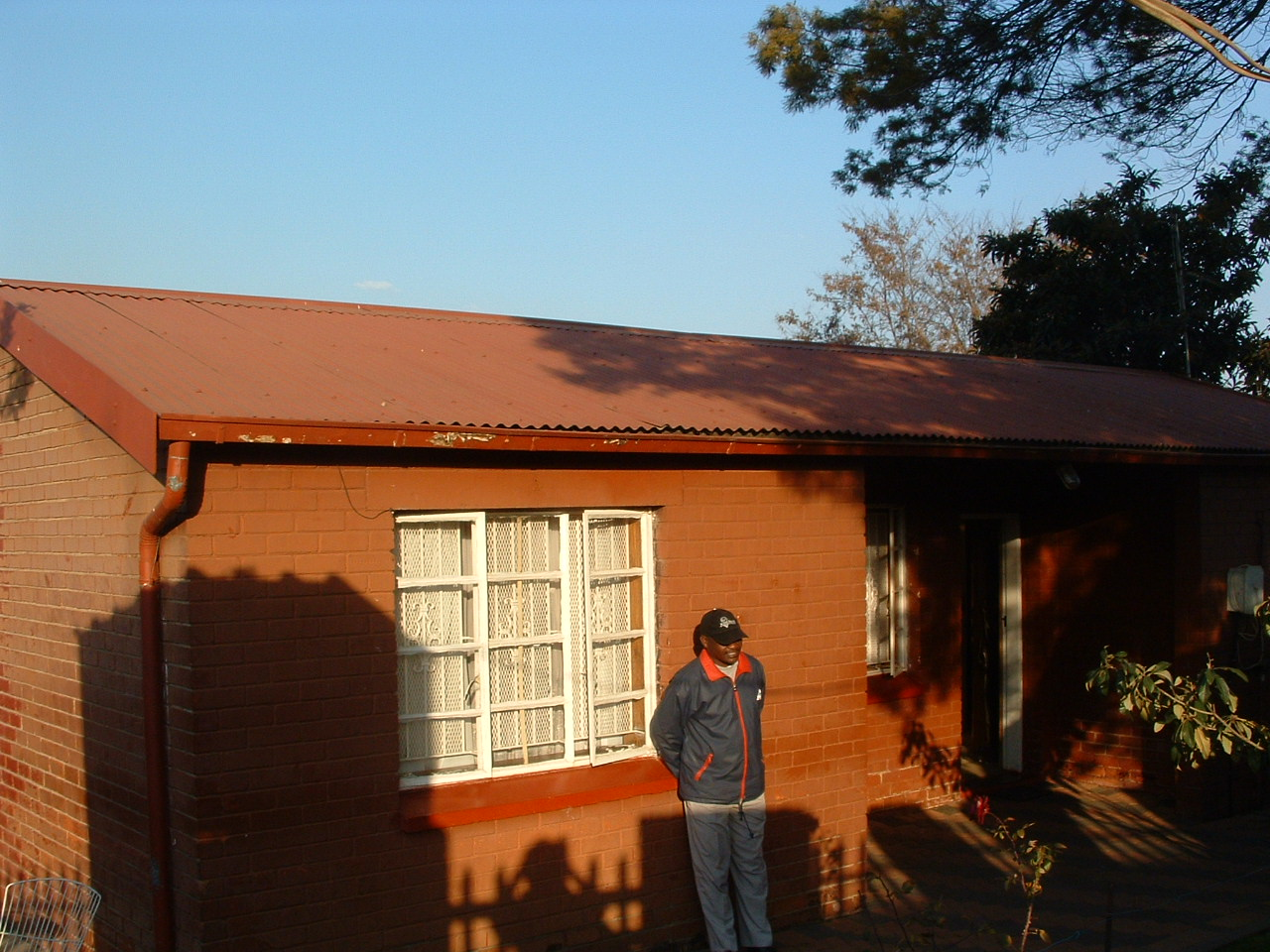
Mandela's House in Orlando

- James Mpanza (1889–1970), civic leader, founder of Orlando Pirates F.C., known as 'the father of Soweto'
- Winnie Mandela (1936–2018), anti-apartheid activist and politician, ex-wife of Nelson Mandela
- Gibson Kente (1932–2004), playwright
- Irvin Khoza (b. 27 January 1948), South African football administrator, Chairman of Orlando Pirates
- Aggrey Klaaste (1940–2004), newspaper journalist and editor
- Nelson Mandela (1918–2013), President of South Africa, anti-apartheid revolutionary, political leader and peace activist, spent many years living in Soweto; his Soweto home in Orlando is currently a major tourist attraction
- Hastings Ndlovu (1961–1976), student killed during the 1976 Soweto uprising
- Lilian Ngoyi (1911–1980), anti-apartheid activist, who spent 18 years under house arrest in Mzimhlope
- Joe Mafela (1942–2017), actor, writer, producer, director, singer, and businessman
- Mzwakhe Mbuli (b. 1959), poet known as "The People's Poet, musician and actor
- Terry Pheto (b. 1981), actress best known for her leading role as Miriam in the 2005 Oscar-winning feature film Tsotsi
- Pallance Dladla (b. 1992), actor
- Steven Pienaar (b. 1982), footballer with national team and Everton F.C.
- Hector Pieterson (1963–1976), the first student to be killed during the 1976 Soweto uprising who features in an iconic press photograph of the event; has a memorial and museum named after him in Orlando West
- Percy Qoboza (1938–1988), newspaper journalist and editor
- Gerard Sekoto (1913–1993), artist, lived in Kliptown before emigrating to France in 1947
- Desmond Tutu (1931–2021), cleric and activist who rose to worldwide fame during the 1980s through his opposition to apartheid
- Matlhaela Michael Masote (1941–2017), violinist and conductor, the founder of the Soweto Youth Orchestra – the first black youth orchestra in South Africa.

== See also ==
- Tembisa
- Katlehong
- The World (South African newspaper)
- Region 6 (Johannesburg)
- Soweto riots
- Norweto
- Stompie Moeketsi
