= Orlando Power Station =

Coal power station in South Africa (1942–1998)

Orlando Power Stations
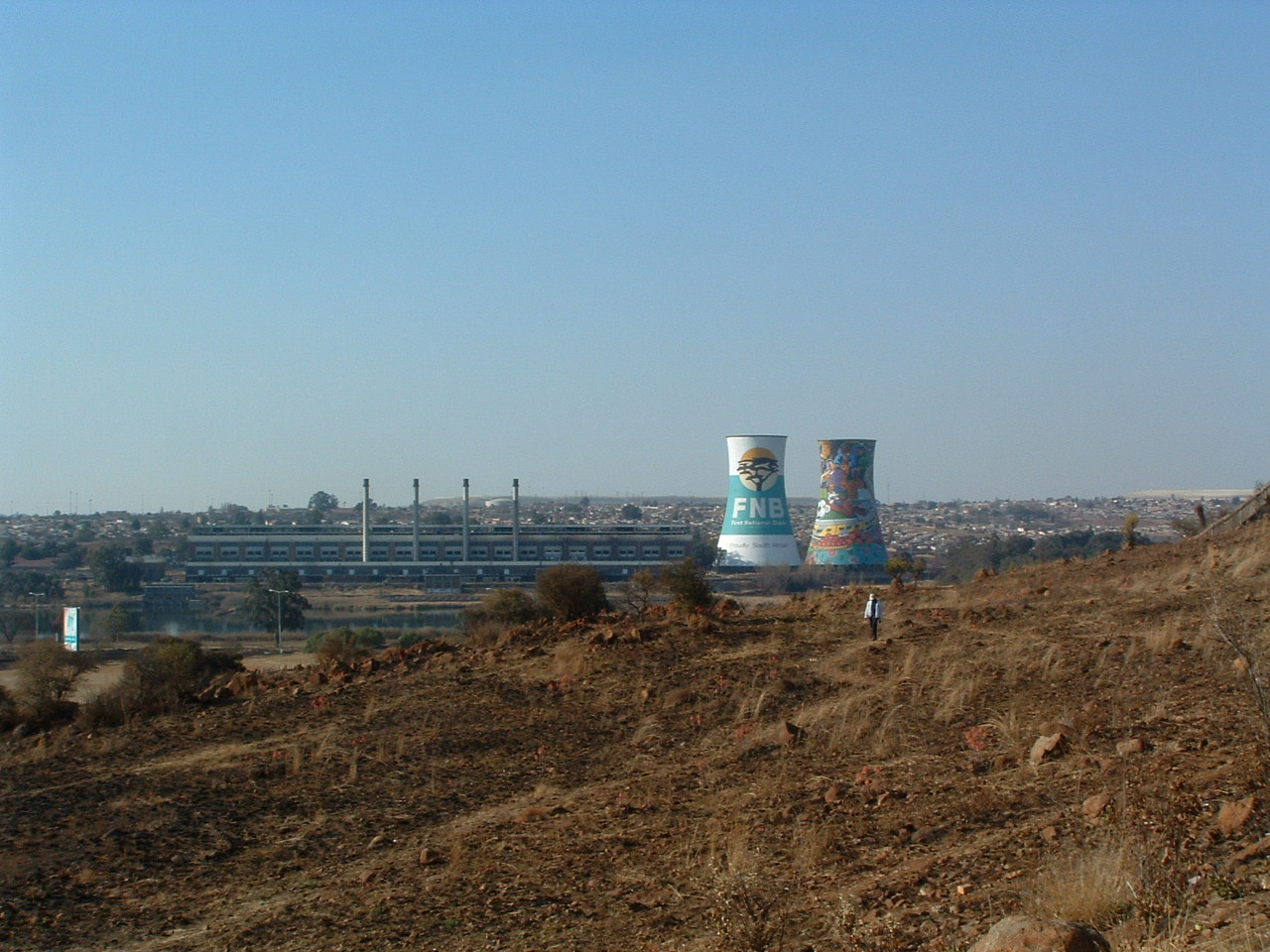
- Orlando Power Station and Cooling Towers
- Location of Orlando Power Station in South Africa
- Country: South Africa
- Location: Soweto
- Coordinates: 26°15′14″S 27°55′30″E
- Status: Decommissioned
- Commission date: 1942
- Decommission date: 1998
- Owner: City of Johannesburg

Thermal power station
- Primary fuel: Coal

Power generation
- Nameplate capacity: 300 Megawatt

External links
- Commons: Related media on Commons

Orlando Power Station is a decommissioned coal-fired power station in Soweto, South Africa. The power station was commissioned at the end of the Second World War and served Johannesburg for over 50 years.

== History ==
Planning for the construction of Orlando started in 1935, as the electricity demand of Johannesburg was rising faster than what could be met with the existing City Generating Station located in downtown Johannesburg. The location for the station was selected due to its proximity to water supply for coolant and railway lines for the delivery of coal. Construction started in 1939 with Merz & McLellan as consulting engineers, but completion was delayed due to the outbreak of the Second World War. The last phase of construction was completed in 1955. Until 1990 two Robert Stephenson & Hawthorns saddle-tank steam engines (Nos. 7805 Elizabeth an 0-6-0ST and 7398 George an 0-4-0ST were used to move incoming coal trains through a wagon tipper at the power plant.

The station was decommissioned in 1998 after 56 years of service.

In 2006 work was started to transform the site of the power station into an entertainment and business centre.

On 25 June 2014, the decommissioned power plant collapsed, killing 1 and trapping 5 others in the rubble.

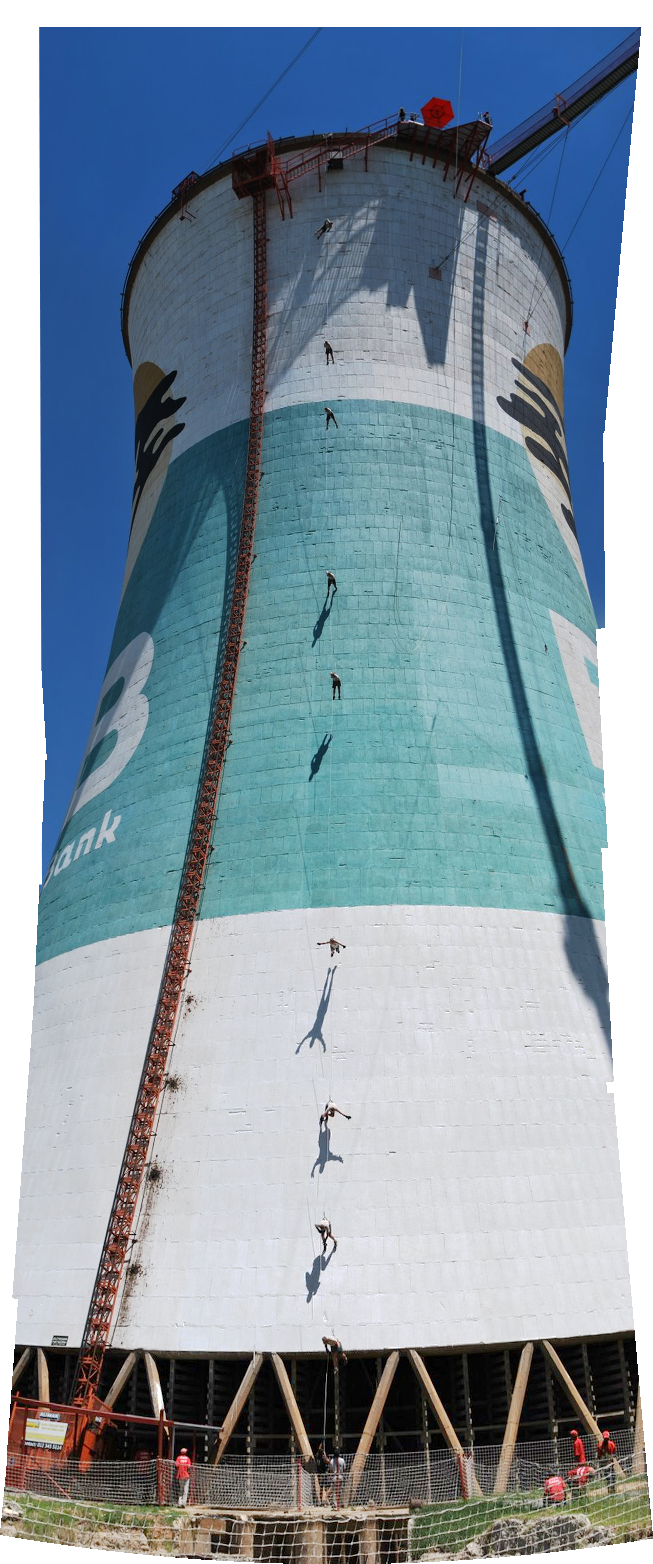
Climber rap jumping down the cooling towers.

== Cooling towers ==
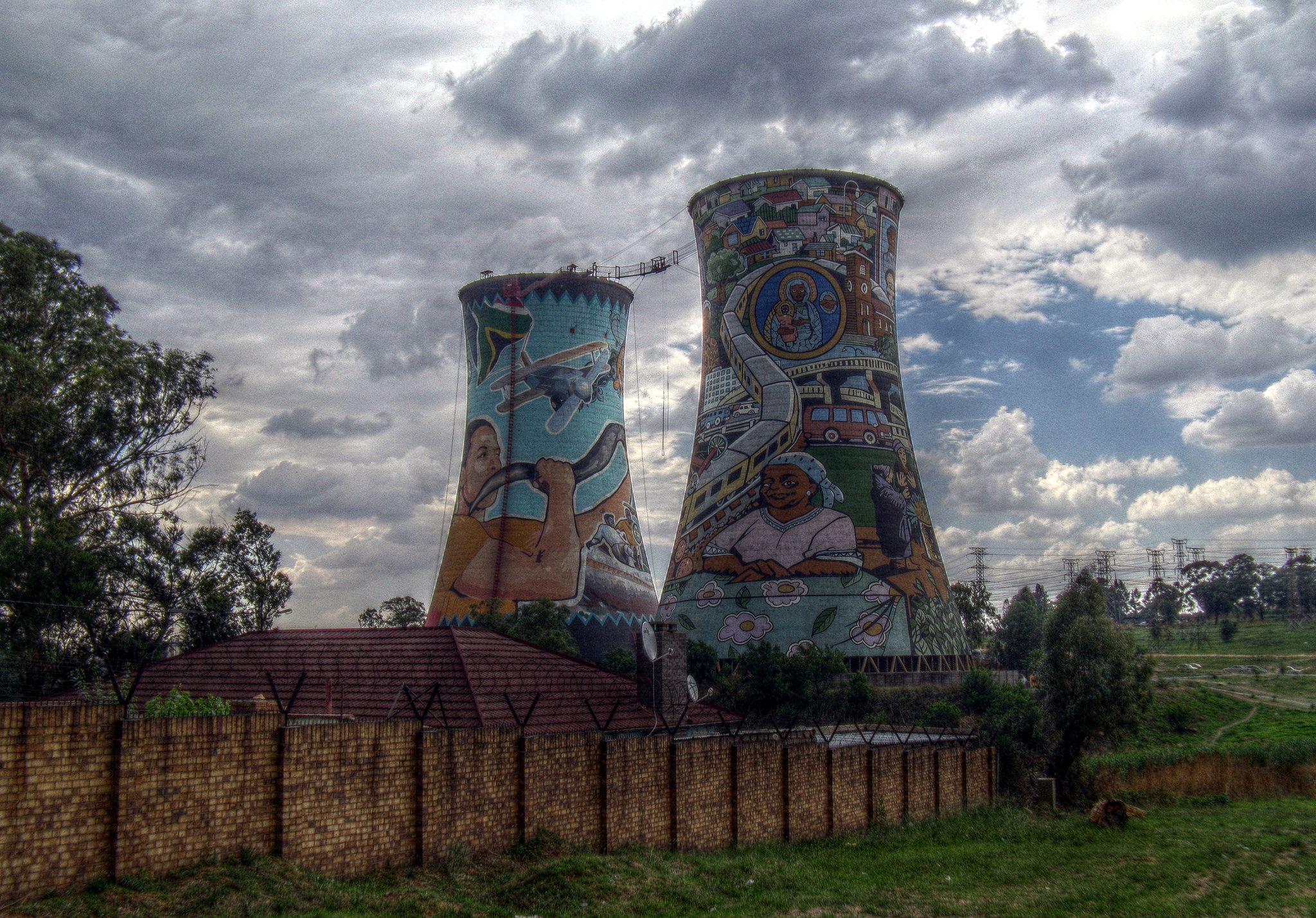
Decommissioned cooling towers with vivid decoration in 2014

The two cooling towers are a prominent landmark in Soweto. They were built in 1951 to supplement the spray pond cooling system as this source of cooling was running at its capacity.

Being supplied by sewage effluent from the Klipspruit Sewage Works, the spray ponds at Orlando were the first in South Africa to make use of this ready supply of coolant liquid.

Both towers are painted, one functioning as an advertising billboard and the other containing the largest mural painting in South Africa. The towers are also used for bungee and BASE jumping from a platform between the top of the two towers as well as a bungee swing into one of the towers.

== In film and TV ==
The tower was used for a Fast Forward on the seventh season of The Amazing Race. The task was for one team (Ray & Deana in particular) to walk across a suspension bridge spanning one of the cooling towers 30 storeys above the ground. In the movie Chappie the power station is the headquarter of the protagonists, the two iconic cooling towers and the main building are decorated with typical Die Antwoord artwork. The towers also appeared on the Dutch television series Wie is de Mol? where contestants in the premiere of the show's thirteenth season bungee jumped off of the towers. The towers were mentioned in the Season 3, Episode 5 episode of Wild Things with Dominic Monaghan.

In the second season of Sky One’s An Idiot Abroad the towers feature as Ricky Gervais and Stephen Merchant attempt to get host Karl Pilkington to bungee jump from a platform suspended between the two to no avail. One of the cameramen, however, does jump.

== See also ==
- List of power stations in South Africa
