= 2002 Soweto bombings =

Series of white separatist terrorist attacks in South Africa

The 2002 Soweto bombings were a string of terrorist attacks that occurred in Soweto in Gauteng, South Africa. Eight blasts took place on 30 October 2002, leaving one woman dead and her husband severely injured. One of the blasts severely damaged a mosque, while others targeted railways and petrol stations in the area. SAPS (South African Police Service) prevented one blast. Another bomb later detonated outside the Nan Hua Buddhist temple in Bronkhorstspruit, east of Pretoria. A white supremacist group, the Warriors of the Boer Nation, claimed responsibility for these explosions in a message sent to an Afrikaans newspaper.

Two subsequent explosions on 28 November 2002 damaged a bridge in the area, and another damaged a police helicopter in a small airport. In all, at least ten, and possibly twelve, individual bombings made up the 2002 Soweto Bombings attack.

== Background ==
Since the end of the apartheid system in 1994, some white South Africans—Afrikaners in particular—felt alienated by black rule and the government of the African National Congress (or ANC). They feared the concurrent violence against whites in Zimbabwe would spill across the border into South Africa. In particular, there were concerns about the rising wave of crime across the country.

In the month leading up to the bombings, sixteen members of the Boeremag (a militant far-right organization) had been put on trial for plotting to overthrow the government. This group, and others like it, had been formed in response to the ANC rebellion in the early 1990s—and the resulting violence, described by the then ruling National Party government as terrorism. South Africa has had a history of such events. In 1996, bombs had targeted a Western Cape shopping center, killing four Cape Coloured shoppers, and injuring sixty others.

== The bombs ==
Two of the 30 October 2002 explosions targeted the railway lines at Lenasia, which connects Soweto to Johannesburg, causing chaos with public transport networks. Another bomb ripped apart the walls of a mosque, and another explosion (in a residential area) killed a woman, Claudia Mokone, while severely injuring her husband. A petrol station was targeted in one of the attacks. Two other people were injured in other bombings. A device placed in the basement of the Nan Hua Buddhist temple was prevented from causing fatalities when it was kicked away by someone at the scene before detonating, although it still injured two people. (At the time, it was not known whether this bomb was related to the attacks. The police later stated that it was.) Police prevented a blast at another petrol station in the area, when they received a tip-off about two white men who were said to be acting suspiciously and "rolling something".

These terrorist attacks caused horror and grief in the community, where no such violence had occurred throughout its history. Fears were heightened soon after when a power failure struck Soweto, although this was not related to terrorism.

=== Later bombings ===
Almost a month later, on 28 November 2002, another bomb exploded on a bridge near Port Edward in KwaZulu-Natal. Nobody was hurt. A more powerful bomb had exploded the previous weekend at an airport used by police, damaging a helicopter, although authorities could not confirm that either explosion was linked to the previous attacks.

== Investigation and trial ==
Thomas Vorster, a senior military intelligence officer under the apartheid regime, was arrested for his alleged involvement into the attacks shortly after they occurred. Twenty white men in the Boeremag organisation, including Vorster, were subsequently charged with: treason for their part in the bombings; the murder of Claudia Makone; attempted murder for a plot to kill Nelson Mandela with a car bomb; and conspiracy to overthrow the government. According to The Namibian, 26 pipe bombs were found in a rural area of Cape Province by police searching for the terrorists responsible for the attacks.

There was a heavy police presence in the area where the trial of the men took place, to prevent further attacks and escape attempts. There was speculation that several officers in the South African police and military had had links to the attacks. The trial was expected to last more than two years, and is still ongoing at the time of this writing (2005).

The trial was adjourned several times due to legal arguments. It soon became politicised as Paul Kruger, the defence lawyer, argued that the South African government was illegitimate and unconstitutional, and that the first multi-racial elections in the country had not been valid, as white voters had never been consulted. The defence originally planned to call the former President of South Africa, FW De Klerk, as a witness to prove their case. The court later ruled that he could not be forced to stand.

At trial, the alleged terrorists claimed that they had been subject to torture in the jail in which they were being held. They had, in fact, been forced at times to listen to very loud rap music and kwaito in the Pretoria prison in which they were being held. The judge presiding over the case, Eberhardt Bertelsmann, forbade the prison authorities from broadcasting Metro FM, the offending radio station. However, the defendants had to buy portable radios and batteries for the inmates who wanted to continue listening to the music.

== Motivation ==
The terrorists were said to be motivated by a sense of alienation and frustration with their situation in South Africa, as well as religious beliefs similar to Christian Identity, which asserted their "God-given right to rule the nation". They subsequently issued additional threats, asserting that there would be "further surprises" in store. One of the group's stated aims was to assassinate Nelson Mandela and possibly restore apartheid to South Africa, although others have suggested that their aim was to start a race war and "kick the blacks out of the country", while still others have asserted that they aimed to set up an independent white Afrikaner nation.

A letter to the police sent by the organisation suggested a religious motive to the attacks, accusing those who opposed them of being the enemies of the "God of Blood River," describing themselves as "Soldiers of God" and suggesting that the bombings were "the beginning of the end" of the ANC. The letter declared:

We also declare that it is the end of suppression of the Boer nation, and for that we honour only God. For this reason the ANC must also know that it is not only dealing with the Boer nation, but with the revenge… of the God of the Boer nation. Here in the Southland we will establish a nation for our God that will honour only Him.

In what South African intelligence services interpreted as referring to the attacks on the mosque and the Buddhist temple, the letter went on to say that no "heathen temples or places of prayer would be permitted in the Southland". It also vowed to avenge farm murders and rapes carried out by South African criminals.

== Aftermath ==
The attacks, although relatively minor, provoked debate in the South African media, as well as the government, about the position of whites in South Africa, especially Afrikaners—who had largely dominated politics before the end of apartheid. Many Afrikaners felt stigmatised that they were unfairly viewed as racists linked to terrorist groups, even though the majority rejected such acts.

In their book, "Volk, Faith and Fatherland", researchers Martin Schonteiff and Henri Boschoff argued that "Given the real high levels of violent crime, rising white unemployment and the campaign against white farmers in Zimbabwe, such arguments [i.e., the ones used by the terrorists] may be capable of eliciting widespread sympathy among conservatively-minded Afrikaners" .

All of the mainstream political parties usually associated with whites, the Democratic Alliance, the New National Party and the Freedom Front, condemned the bombings, and the Defence Minister, Mosiuoa Lekota pointed out that most white South Africans were loyal citizens.
