= Regina Mundi Catholic Church (Soweto) =

Largest Roman Catholic church in South Africa

Regina Mundi Roman Catholic Church
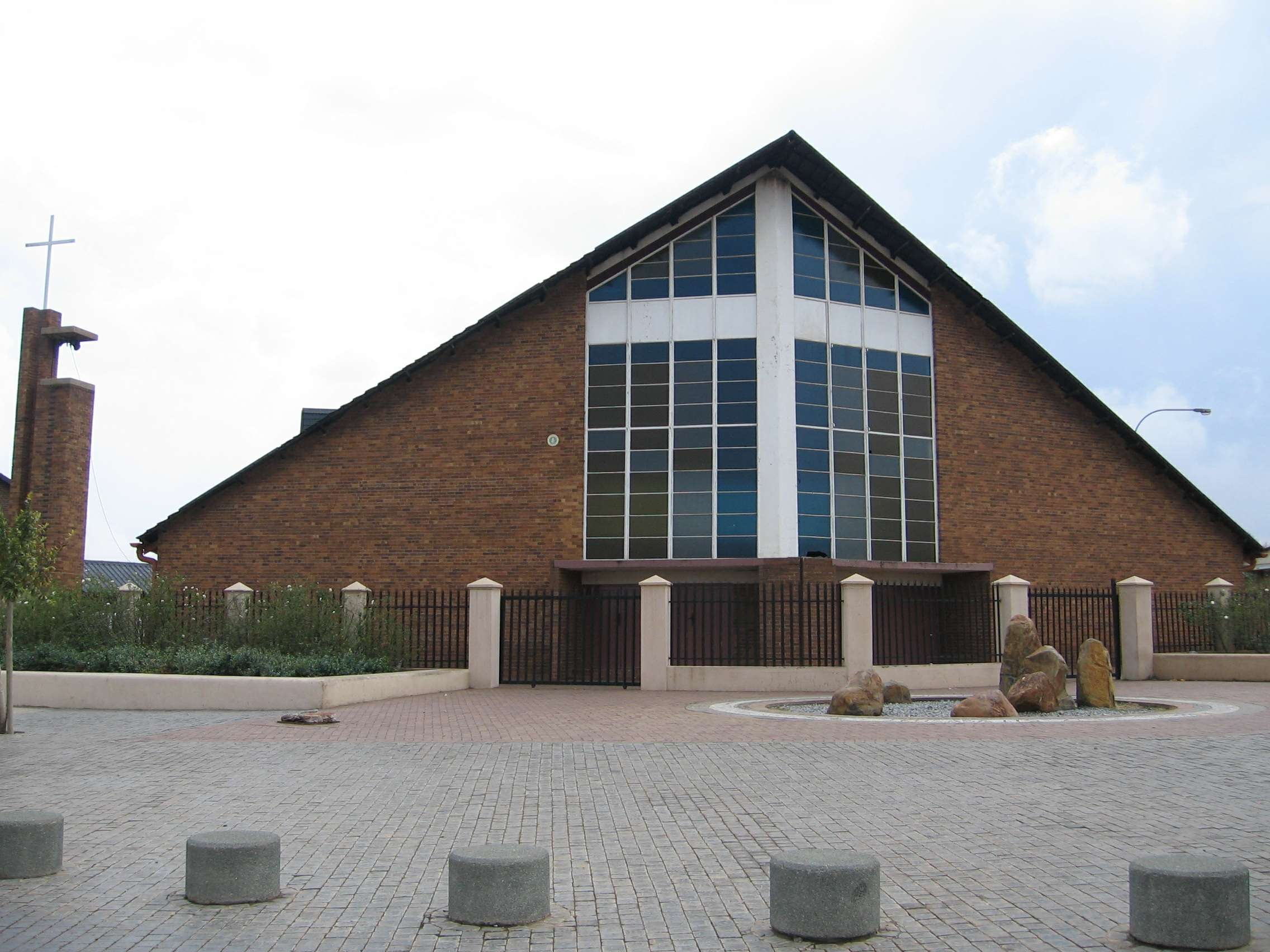

Religion
- Affiliation: Roman Catholic Church

Location
- Location: Moroka, Soweto
- Interactive map of Regina Mundi Roman Catholic Church
- Coordinates: 26°15′43″S 27°52′58″E

Architecture
- Architect: Anthony Noel Errol Slaven
- Groundbreaking: 1960
- Completed: 1962
- Direction of façade: South

Regina Mundi (Latin for "Queen of the World"), designed by architect Anthony Noel Errol Slaven, is the largest Roman Catholic church in South Africa. It is located in Rockville, Soweto, a populous black urban residential area within the city of Johannesburg. Due to the role it played as a place of gathering for the people of Soweto in the years before, during, and after the anti-apartheid struggle, it is often referred to as "the people's church" or "the people's cathedral".

The church is located in the middle of Soweto, in Rockville, in the neighbourhood of Moroka; it was built in 1964, replacing Moroka's former parish church. While the A-shaped exterior of the building is quite ordinary in design, its main feature is the vast interior, that can accommodate as many as 5000-7000 people. The stained-glass windows are decorated with scenes of Mary's life and were donated by Poland in 1998.

One of the most prominent artifacts in the church is the painting entitled "The Madonna and Child of Soweto", mostly referred to as "The Black Madonna", depicting a black Virgin Mary holding the Child Jesus (also black). The painting was created by artist Larry Scully in 1973, as a part of a campaign to raise funds for the education of black South Africans. The painting was then bought by a benefactor and donated to the church. A highly symbolic element of the painting is a large eye right under the Black Madonna. According to journalist Mpho Lukoto of newspaper The Star, the pupil of the eye represents the township of Soweto; two forks directed towards the pupil from the sides represent the violence that was used against the people of Soweto during the apartheid era, and the cross in the center of the pupil represents the Church that illuminates the people with hope.

After the end of apartheid, a large park was built before the church, with a fountain and memorials, including a "peace pole" donated to the church by Japanese Christians. The church is still a popular place for the people of Soweto and it has also become a prominent tourist attraction in the area.

== Regina Mundi and the anti-apartheid movement ==
Regina Mundi played a pivotal role in the struggle against apartheid in the second half of the 20th century. Since political meetings in most public places were banned, the church became the main place where Soweto people could meet and discuss. Even funerals often ended up as political meetings. For this reason, Regina Mundi earned the reputation of being one of the main centres of anti-apartheid activism in the province of Gauteng.

During the Soweto uprising of June 16, 1976, when students were shot by the police in Orlando West (with Hector Pieterson and others being killed), many demonstrants fled to Regina Mundi. The police entered the church, firing live ammunition. No one was killed, although many were injured and the church itself, as well as its furniture, decorations, and symbols (for example the marble altar and the statue of Christ), were damaged. Both the interior and the external walls of the church still bear the signs of the shootings.

After the end of apartheid, from 1995 to 1998, several meetings of the Truth and Reconciliation Commission were held in the church, presided over by Archbishop Desmond Tutu. From 1995 on, funds were raised to restore the church. The campaign eventually collected 1.5 million rands, and restorations were made.

The events of 1976 are commemorated by a dedicated ceremony held in the church every year on June 16.

== Regina Mundi Day ==
In 1997, President Nelson Mandela established 30 November as "Regina Mundi Day" to honour the church.

== International visitors ==
- In March 1998, Regina Mundi was visited by the President of the United States of America Bill Clinton with his wife Hillary. Their visit was controversial as they received Holy Communion in the church despite not being Catholics. Clinton's visit was also widely covered by the media because the sermon mostly revolved on the topic of adultery, seemingly to the discomfort of President Clinton who was at the time involved in the Lewinsky scandal.
- First Lady of the United States Michelle Obama visited the church on the South Africa leg of her tour of the continent in 2011. She addressed the Young African Women Leaders Forum at the church, and in attendance were the Archbishop of Johannesburg and other women leaders.

== See also ==
- Holy Trinity Catholic Church, Braamfontein, a Catholic church recently compared to Regina Mundi for its role as a place of sanctuary during the #FeesMustFall protests of 2016.
