= Boeremag =

Far-right South African terrorist organization

- A Boeremag flag featuring a Winged Odal SS-rune. The flag was discovered in the aftermath of the 2002 Soweto bombings.
- Leader: Mike du Toit
- Dates active: 2001 - 2002
- Active regions: South Africa (primarily in Gauteng)
- Ideology: Volkstaat; Afrikaner nationalism; White supremacy; White separatism; Neo-Nazism; Christian Identity
- Status: Designated as a terrorist group by the Government of South Africa
- Part of: AWB political ideology

The Boeremag ([ˈbuːr.ə.maχ], "Boer Power") was a far-right white supremacist terrorist organisation in South Africa. The South African government described them as a South African right-wing terrorist organization with white separatist aims. The Boeremag were accused of planning to overthrow the ruling African National Congress government and to reinstate a new Boer-administered republic reminiscent of the era when Boers administered independent republics during the 19th century after the Great Trek.

South African law-enforcement officials charged the Boeremag for being responsible for the 2002 Soweto bombings and arrested twenty-six men, alleged to be members of the Boeremag, in November and December 2002, reportedly seizing over 1,000 kilograms of explosives in the process. Further arrests followed in March 2003.

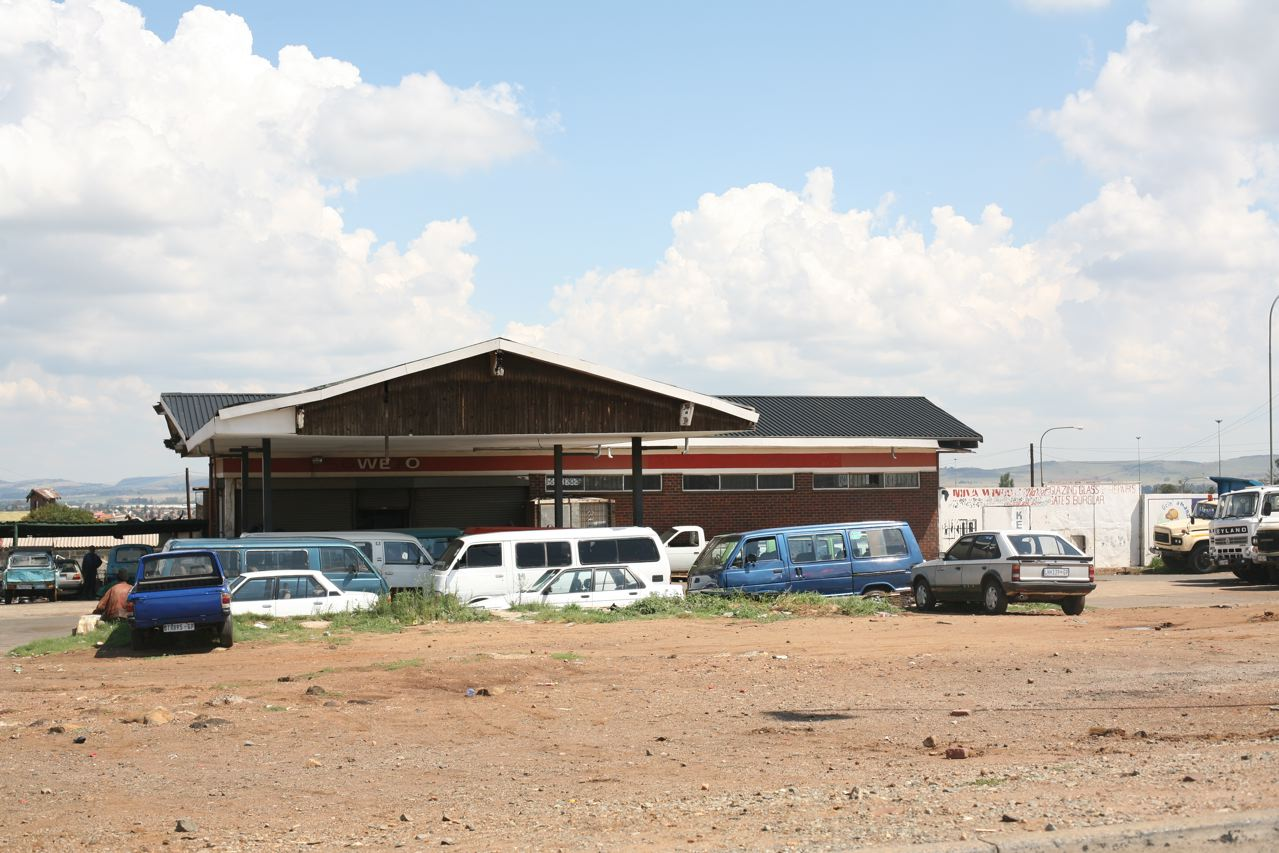
A filling station in Soweto, South Africa said to have been bombed by the Boeremag. As of December 2005 it remains closed and unrepaired.

The first trial of Boeremag suspects began under tight security in Pretoria during May 2003. Twenty-two men were charged with forty-two counts of treason, murder, and illegal weapons possession. Six pleaded not guilty, two did not enter pleas, one refused to plead, and thirteen challenged the court's jurisdiction, alleging that the post-apartheid constitution and government of South Africa are illegitimate. During the trial plans to blow up South African actor Casper de Vries together with eight other individuals were revealed. The group is quoted as saying that the reason for this plan was because De Vries "was not on the right path".

In October 2004 the Pretoria High Court heard testimony from a witness, Deon Crous, who stated under oath that he had assisted two of the accused, Kobus Pretorius and Jacques Jordaan, to manufacture 1500 kg of explosives. Crous testified that five amounts of 300 kg were reserved for five separate bombs. One of the planned bomb attacks was cancelled as there was too high a risk of white civilians being injured. The bombs were to be detonated on December 13, 2002, with various attacks planned to follow the bombings.

In early May 2006 Herman van Rooyen and Rudi Gouws, two of the leading members being tried, escaped from custody. The two men were recaptured on 20 January 2007.

In late October 2013, Mike du Toit, the ringleader of a plot to assassinate Nelson Mandela and expel Black people out of South Africa, was convicted of treason and sentenced to 35 years in prison. Twenty other members of Boeremag were also sentenced to prison terms of between five and 35 years. Herman van Rooyen and Rudi Gouws, two of the co-conspirators of Du Toit, were given longer sentences of 25 years imprisonment for their role in planting bombs in their attempt to assassinate Nelson Mandela.

These men have been imprisoned since 2002. The trial lasted 11 years.

In April 2026, the trials of three members were found by the United Nations Human Rights Committee to have had violations of the right to a fair trial under the International Covenant on Civil and Political Rights, on the grounds of excessive trial length and inability to appeal convictions and sentences.

== See also ==
- Nan Hua Temple bomb explosion
- Siener van Rensburg
