= James Mpanza =

Community leader in Johannesburg, South Africa (1889–1970)

- Born: James Mpanza; 15 May 1889; Georgedale, Kwa-Zulu Natal
- Died: 23 September 1970 (81); Orlando, Soweto, South Africa
- Resting place: Jabulani (Doornkop Cemetery), Soweto
- Other name: Father of Soweto
- Known for: Founder of the Sofasonke Party; Co-founder of Orlando Pirates FC
- Children: Nester Fikile Dladla

James Mpanza (15 May 1889 – 23 September 1970) was a community leader and social activist. From the mid-1940s to the late 1960s, he led land occupations and squatter camp movements due to housing crises. The demolition of these camps led to one of the largest housing developments in South Africa and contributed to the founding of modern Soweto. He co-founded Orlando Pirates FC in 1937 and played a key role in the construction of Orlando Stadium in 1959. Mpanza is known as "the father of Soweto".

== Life ==
Mpanza was born on 15 May 1889 in Georgedale, today part of eThekwini Metropolitan Municipality, a township between Pinetown and Pietermaritzburg in KwaZulu-Natal. His father Ventile Mbihlana Mpanza, an ox cart driver, and his wife Evelyn had four children but their eldest son died before manhood. Mpanza studied until year 6 at Georgedale Primary School, before qualifying with a third-class teaching certificate at Indaleni in Natal.

He was a clerk and interpreter at a solicitors' office when he was 18, and he was falsely convicted of fraud in 1912. He came to notice when he was accused of the murder in 1915 of an Indian shopkeeper called Adam. Mpanza appealed his own case, arguing that he was somewhere else at the time. He was reprieved but he still received a life sentence. He served 13 years in jail, being moved from place to place because he misbehaved and attacked warders. At Cinderella prison in Boksburg at the end of World War 1, he became a Christian and wrote a short book on his ideas and began preaching to his fellow prisoners.

In 1927, he was released and he made his living by teaching in Pretoria, before moving to Orlando, Johannesburg, in 1934. He would ride a horse through Orlando giving rise to an air of eccentricity. In 1937, he formed the Orlando Boys' Club, which was renamed Orlando Pirates Football Club in 1939. In 1958, he sent a proposal to the City of Johannesburg for a stadium in Orlando, which resulted in the construction of Orlando Stadium in 1959.

He held public meetings at his home in Orlando, which is now commemorated as James Mpanza House. In April 1944, despite being seen as controversial, he persuaded 8,000 people to follow him from Orlando to create a new township called Sofasonke Township with himself as unofficial mayor. By 1946, there were 20,000 people squatting there and Mpanza charged a fee to join the camp and to claim a site, and then there was a fee of two shillings and sixpence every week. In return, the squatters had their own police force. Mpanza operated informal courts at his Orlando home where family disputes could be settled. Conditions, however, were poor and there was no health service. The death of Mpanza's son, Dumisani, was put down to poor medical care. The squatters had left the slums of Orlando but their plight was still not certain and Mpanza got the nickname of "Sofasonke" ("we shall all die") as he added his opinion of their outlook if they had no help. It was this rhetoric that got him the nickname but it also encouraged the funding necessary to convert this shantytown into the town of SOuth WEstern TOwnships" or Soweto. It was not just rhetoric, however, as he used his loyal following to create supportive candidates for the Orlando Advisory Board.

Mpanza successfully appealed against a government deportation order that would have exiled him in Natal. This allowed him to continue to influence the Orlando Advisory Board. He later helped to set up the Soweto Urban Banto Council in the 1960s, which reduced his importance.

Mpanza was interested in horse racing and owned his own racehorses in the Orange Free State and in the Transvaal, but because of the laws at the time he had to hire white jockeys to race them.

== Legacy ==
Mpanza died in 1970 at his home in Orlando East and he was given a large civic funeral and buried in Jabulani, Soweto Doornkop cemetery. His Sofasonke Party still thrived and in 1971 it supplied the majority of the council. Twenty years later, it was still a presence in South African politics. The "traditional courts" or makgotla that operated informally in Soweto are thought to have come from the "parents' courts" that Mpanza operated at his own house.

The James Mpanza House where his family lived after his death was given a blue plaque to mark his contribution to the history of South Africa.
