= Tladi =

Tladi is both a surname and a given name. Notable people with the name include:

- Dire Tladi (born 1975), South African legal scholar
- Moses Tladi (1903–1959), South African painter
- Tladi Bokako (born 1993), South African cricketer

== See also ==
- Ladi (given name)
