= Kagiso Media =

South African media company

- Type: Private
- Industry: Broadcasting; Television; Radio; Publishing
- Founded: 1997; 29 years ago
- Founder: Kagiso Trust Investments
- Headquarters: Sandton, Gauteng, South Africa
- Area served: South Africa
- Key people: Frank Chikane (Chairman); Paballo Makosholo (CEO)
- Brands: Urban Brew Studios; Juta; Mediamark; Future Managers; East Coast Radio; OFM; Heart FM; Jacaranda FM; Gagasi FM; Kaya FM
- Owner: Kagiso Tiso Holdings
- Website: kagisomedia.co.za

Kagiso Media is the largest black-owned media corporation in South Africa. It was formed in 1997 by Kagiso Trust Investments, and is headquartered in Sandton, Gauteng.

== History ==
Kagiso Media was established in 1997, and listed on the JSE.

In 1999, Kagiso acquired a 42.5% investment in radio station Jacaranda 94.2. It had a 91% stake in East Coast Radio and 24% stake in OFM that year and a stake in Caxton publishing.

By 2000 it owned Radmark, a radio advertising company, Butterworths, a publishing business, and exhibition businesses, Saitex, Auto Africa and the Rand Show.

In November 2000, a deal was proposed to merge Kasigo with Primedia which would give it 40% stake. The deal required approval from the Independent Communications Authority of South Africa (Icasa) as the two groups owned radio stations that would place them in ownership of more than what was allowed by the regulatory authorities. The merger fell apart in March 2001 after Primedia failed to dispose of its noncore assets and Kasigo step away from the deal.

Another attempt was made in May 2001 by New Africa Investments Limited when it announced a proposed takeover of Kasigo Media's business operations and assets. Primedia issued an objection to the Icasa concerning the New Africa Investments Limited acquisition of Kagiso Media. In January 2002, Icasa blocked the takeover based on ownership rules.

Kagiso, part of a consortium called Johnnic Communication (Johncom), made a conditional bid for the assets of New Africa Investments in September 2003. In late September, their conditional bid was accepted by the Nail board. But by early October, the Tiso Capital consortium outbid the Johncom offer. Competition Commission approved the Tiso bid in January 2004 but recommended that Nial's radio assets be sold.

In 2005, Kagiso increased its stakes in radio station Jacaranda and radio advertising firm Radmark.

In 2006, Kagiso increase it portfolio of radio stations when it purchased P4 and rebranded it as Gagasi 99.5 FM. As well in 2006, Kagiso purchased a further stake in Jacaranda Radio bring its ownership to 80 percent. Later that year in September 2006, a leadership change occurred when CEO Roger Jardine became an executive director and Murphy Morobe was appointed Kagiso's new CEO.

May 2007, saw Kagiso purchase a 50.1 percent stake in Clear Channel Merafe, an outside advertising company and would be renamed Kagiso Outdoor. But sold it 2008. At the end of 2007, Kagiso Media owned 80 percent of the Jacaranda radio station, 100 percent of East Coast Radio and 24.9 percent stake in OFM. Other radio stations in its portfolio included a 33.3 percent each in Heart FM and iGagasi FM and a 25.1 percent stake in Kaya FM.

In January 2008, Kagiso Exhibitions & Events was put up for sale after the sale of the Rand Show event back to the Johannesburg Expo Centre. Its sale was finalised in 2009.

Other acquisitions in 2008 by Kagiso included Acceleration Media, an electronic media planning and strategy agency. In an overseas venture outside of Africa, it partnered with Primetime International in India in 2008 to form RadioMinds. Further acquisition purchases by Kagiso in 2008 saw the purchase of a 50 percent stake in Mobil Alliance whose interests are sport sponsorship and digital technology advertising. and a controlling interest in Urban Brew, company involved in television production. On 29 October 2008, the Competition Tribunal issued a Merger Clearance Certificate approving the merger between Kagiso Media Ltd and Urban Brews Studios (Pty) Ltd unconditionally.

In December 2010, Kasigo's holding company, Kagiso Trust Investments merged with the Tiso Group, to form Kagiso Tiso Holdings.

In October 2011, Kagiso Media announced that it would sell its 50 percent interest in the LexisNexis to Reed Elsevier South Africa. In December 2011, Kasigo announced that it would purchase publisher Juta and Company Ltd. It would sell off Juta's retail section Juta Bookshops in June 2013.

In September 2013, South African investment firm Kagiso Tiso Holdings bid $187 million to take Kagiso Media private, offering a substantial premium to minority shareholders.

Also in 2013, Kagiso entered the television broadcasting market, when it launched Glow TV on the OpenView HD satellite network.

In October 2017, Kagiso Media launched an app called SoundBar, which featured twelve different internet music stations.

== Operations ==
As of 2026, Kagiso Media's brands include:

- Urban Brew Studios
- Juta
- Mediamark
- Future Managers
- East Coast Radio
- OFM
- Heart FM
- Jacaranda FM
- Gagasi FM
- Kaya FM
