= Chomane Chomane =

- Born: 1957 (age 68–69); Viljoenskroon, Free State, South Africa
- Occupations: Radio Broadcaster, Educator
- Years active: 1981–2017
- Employer: SABC
- Known for: Presenter of Ha Re Ye on Lesedi FM

Chomane Chomane (born 1957) is a veteran South African radio broadcaster and former educator. He is best known for his 36-year career at Lesedi FM, the South African Broadcasting Corporation's (SABC) Sesotho-language station.

== Early life and education ==
Chomane was born in 1957 on a farm near Viljoenskroon in the Free State. Growing up in a rural environment, he developed a profound command of the Sesotho language.

He was a teacher by profession, having completed his pedagogical training before moving to Soweto. During his time in the classroom, he was known for his "radio voice" and oratorical skills, which he would later transition into a full-time career in media following the educational instabilities in the late 1970s.

== Career ==
=== Joining the SABC ===
Chomane officially joined the SABC in 1981. He began his career at what was then known as "Radio Sesotho" during an era where radio served as the primary source of news and cultural preservation for the Sesotho-speaking population.

=== Lesedi FM and "Ha Re Ye" ===
In the mid-1990s, Chomane was appointed as the host of the morning drive-time show, Ha Re Ye ("Let’s Go"). His broadcasting style was characterized by a resonant bass voice, a sophisticated use of Sesotho idioms, and a blend of humor with community advocacy. Under his leadership, the show reached an audience of over 1.6 million listeners. He was also the host of the popular quiz show Kgetsi ya Dimo. He became a mentor to many younger broadcasters, earning the nickname "The Chomaniser."

=== Retirement ===
Chomane retired from the SABC in April 2017 after 36 years of continuous service. His retirement was marked by national tributes from the broadcasting industry and the South African public.

=== Legal issues ===
In the mid-2000s, Chomane Chomane and other Lesedi FM presenters were accused of using their on-air time to promote Power Mix, a product sold by a fellow presenter and colleague,Thuso Motaung. The investigation that followed revealed that the SABC (South African Broadcasting Corporation) did not authorize the promotion of this product, which was accused of costing the broadcaster millions in revenue. Chomane admitted to encouraging listeners to buy the product but suggested he was following orders at the time.

== Recognition ==
In 2023, Chomane was formally honored by the Free State Department of Sport, Arts, Culture, and Recreation for his lifelong contribution to the arts and his role in the preservation of the Sesotho heritage through mass media.

- Honorary Doctorate (2024): Dr. Chomane was recognized with an honorary doctorate for his service to Lesedi FM and the community, having served the station for over 30 years.
- SABC PBS Radio Recognition (2004): He was honored by the SABC for his contributions to the growth of Lesedi FM and the corporation.
- Community Development Award (2015): He was nominated for an award for community development alongside others in the Free State for his dedication and professionalism.
