= Dan Montsitsi =

South African politician and activist (1952–2021)

Delegate to the National Council of Provinces

Assembly Member for Gauteng
- In office 7 May 2009 – 21 April 2014

Member of the National Assembly
- In office 9 May 1994 – May 2009

Personal details
- Born: Sediane Danny Montsitsi; 24 May 1952 Alexandra, Transvaal; Union of South Africa
- Died: 13 June 2021 (aged 69)
- Citizenship: South Africa
- Party: African National Congress

Sediane Danny "Sechaba" Montsitsi (24 May 1952 – 13 June 2021) was a South African politician and former anti-apartheid activist. One of the leaders of the 1976 Soweto uprising, he later represented the African National Congress in Parliament from 1994 to 2014.

Born in Alexandra, Montsitsi entered student politics during apartheid through the South African Students Movement in Soweto. He was the president of the Soweto Students' Representative Council from January 1977 until June 1977, when he was arrested and detained for his role in the uprising and subsequent unrest. In what became known as the Soweto 11 trial, Montsitsi and his deputy, Murphy Morobe, were convicted with nine others on sedition charges. After four years' imprisonment on Robben Island from 1979 to 1983, he became a youth leader in the United Democratic Front of the Transvaal. He served in the post-apartheid National Assembly from 1994 to 2009 and then in the National Council of Provinces from 2009 to 2014.

== Early life and activism ==
Montsitsi was born on 24 May 1952 in Alexandra, a township outside Johannesburg in the former Transvaal. He attended Sekano-Ntoane Secondary School in Senaoane, Soweto, where he became involved in anti-apartheid student politics, joining the Black Consciousness-aligned South African Students Movement in 1974.

=== Soweto uprising: 1976–1977 ===
On 16 June 1976, students in Soweto held a march against Bantu Education and the apartheid government's plan to institute Afrikaans as a medium of instruction in black schools. Montsitsi was one of the leaders of the Senaoane contingent of the march. After the police massacred protesting students, the protests continued, in what became known as the Soweto uprising. The programme in Soweto was largely coordinated by an action committee called the Soweto Students' Representative Council (SSRC), and Montsitsi became its third president, after his two predecessors – Tsietsi Mashinini and then Khotso Seathlolo – fled in succession into exile. He took over the presidency from Seathlolo in January 1977 and held the office until his arrest five months later.

=== Soweto 11 trial and detention: 1977–1983 ===
On 10 June 1977, amid a broader police crackdown, Montsitsi and other members of his committee were arrested by the Security Branch while preparing to commemorate the first anniversary of the 16 June march. He had been evading arrest for several months. He was detained without trial for over a year and spent much of that time in solitary confinement. He was severely tortured by police interrogators in Pretoria, who he said "squeezed my testicles with pliers, gun-butted my face, punched me and beat me with rubber truncheons", among other things. His claims were substantiated by a government doctor, who later testified before court that Montsitsi had suffered welts, bruises, and a head injury requiring treatment with an anti-epileptic drug. Montsitsi later said that interrogators had attempted to compel him to admit that the protests were a conspiracy orchestrated by the illegal African National Congress (ANC).

In late 1978, Montsitsi and ten others were brought to trial in the Transvaal Supreme Court on sedition charges – the first time in at least thirty years that such a charge had been pursued by the state – with an alternative charge of terrorism. They were denied bail. In what become known as the Soweto 11 trial, the state argued that the SSRC had fomented anti-government upheaval in Soweto in the months after 16 June 1976. The defendants pled not guilty, contending that their motives had been peaceful, but, in May 1979, Judge Hendrik van Dyk rejected this argument, ruling that the defendants had planned a revolution and that they, not the police, were responsible for the ensuing violence. They were convicted of sedition; indeed, handing down his ruling, van Dyk said that Montsitsi in particular had behaved seditiously from the first day of the unrest. According to Montsitsi, "I didn’t know what the hell sedition was, but if it meant organising the students to fight against bantu education then, ja, the judge was right, I behaved seditiously."

All 11 defendants were sentenced to five or more years in prison, with Montsitsi sentenced to the longest term of eight years; his deputy in the SSRC, Murphy Morobe, came in a close second, with a seven-year sentence. Because four years of the sentence were suspended, Montsitsi served four years on Robben Island. He later said of his incarceration, "I expected Robben Island to be a place of dark horror, but when I arrived I discovered a political institution", referring to the leadership and political education provided by imprisoned ANC leaders Walter Sisulu, Govan Mbeki, and Nelson Mandela.

=== United Democratic Front: 1983–1991 ===
Upon his release in mid-1983, Montsitsi became a prominent figure in the Soweto Civic Association and the Transvaal branch of the United Democratic Front (UDF). In 1985, he was elected as a member of the UDF provincial executive and appointed as its youth organiser. Still in his early 30s, he was involved in establishing the Soweto Youth Congress and later the South African Youth Congress. He later said, "Morobe and I made a noise when we came out. When we addressed rallies we would say, 'No, it’s not me speaking, it's Mandela.' Through us, people could see Mandela and Sisulu were alive".

In January 1988, Montsitsi was arrested again under the prevailing state-of-emergency regulations. He was detained without trial for sixteen months before he was released in early 1989 after participating in a prolonged hunger strike. Upon his release to Soweto, he was served with a stringent banning order.

== Parliament: 1994–2014 ==
In South Africa's first post-apartheid elections in 1994, Montsitsi was elected to an ANC seat in the National Assembly, the lower house of the new South African Parliament. He served three terms in his seat, gaining re-election in 1999 and 2004.

At the conclusion of his third term, in the 2009 general election, he was elected to the Gauteng caucus of the National Council of Provinces, the upper house of Parliament. He was appointed as leader of the ANC's parliamentary caucus in 2013. However, in the general election the following year, Montsitsi was ranked too low on the ANC's party list to gain re-election to Parliament, and he subsequently retired from active politics.

== Retirement and death ==
Montsitsi retired to Dobsonville, Soweto. He was deputy chairperson of the June 16, 1976 Foundation, a youth development organisation, and in that capacity, in his later years, he was critical of the "corruption and theft" of the post-apartheid ANC government. On 13 June 2021, Health Minister Joe Phaahla announced that Montsitsi had died of complications from COVID-19.
