= The Sowetan =

Daily newspaper in South Africa

- Type: Daily newspaper
- Format: Tabloid
- Owner: Arena Holdings
- Editor: Nwabisa Makunga
- Founded: 2 February 1981; 45 years ago
- Language: English
- Headquarters: Johannesburg, Gauteng, South Africa
- Website: sowetanlive.co.za

The Sowetan is an English-language South African daily newspaper that started in 1981 as a liberation struggle newspaper and was freely distributed to households in the then apartheid-segregated township of Soweto, in the city of Johannesburg, Gauteng.

It is one of the largest national newspapers in South Africa. Regarded as having a left-leaning editorial tone, it carried a readership of almost 2 million and a circulation of 124,000 in 2006.

The newspaper is the property of a South African media company Arena Holdings (formerly Tiso Blackstar Group, Avusa, and Times Media Group). Before that, it belonged to Dr. Nthato Motlana (1925–30 November 2008), a prominent South African businessman, physician and anti-apartheid activist, who took a leading role in the formation of the New African Investments Limited (NAIL), which purchased The Sowetan following the apartheid.

== History ==
The Sowetan was founded in 1981 as a replacement of the Post Transvaal newspaper, which itself consisted of editorial staff that migrated from another newspaper, The World. At the time, there was a total strike at the Post (for better increases). The strike lasted so long that the Post, which was financially independent from the Argus printing and publishing, nearly went bankrupt, resulting in the property and printing presses being sold to Caxtons. Caxtons then got the contract to print the Post and another building was found in Industria.

Two days before publishing the Post, the government decided to ban it again. The Post had more newspaper names registered, and after some deliberation, it was decided to go with The Sowetan. This was a weekly, Saturday and Sunday paper. The latter was later closed as it was never financially viable. The Sowetan never was a free sheet as it was never published before this date. The name was registered at the time with the intention to publish at a rather huge cost. It was one of more titles registered as a backup at the time.

Initial sales were slow because people wrongly assumed that The Sowetan had only news from Soweto. It was in fact a countrywide newspaper from the beginning and was distributed in the Transvaal, Natal, Orange Free State, with copies also going to Port Elizabeth and Cape Town. Due to the poor sales and high costs, the Port Elizabeth and Cape Town distribution was stopped after a few years. It took nearly two years before it was accepted and sales started soaring. Percy Qoboza was the editor at the time but was soon replaced by Joe Latakgomo. Latagomo started as a sports editor in 1967. Later Latakgomo left and joined The Star, after receiving death threats, and was replaced by Aggrey Klaaste, who was editor from 1988 to 2002.

== Distribution areas ==
Distribution
	2008	2013
Eastern Cape	Y	
Free State	Y	Y
Gauteng	Y	Y
Kwa-Zulu Natal	Y	Y
Limpopo	Y	Y
Mpumalanga	Y	Y
North West	Y	Y
Northern Cape	Y	Y
Western Cape	Y	Y

== Distribution figures ==
Circulation
	Net Sales
Jan – Mar 2015	99 244
Jan – Mar 2014	99 403
Oct – Dec 2012	100 349
Jul – Sep 2012	101 155
Apr – Jun 2012	98 156
Jan – Mar 2012	98 128

== Readership figures ==
Estimated Readership
	AIR
January – December 2012	1 646 000
July 2011 – June 2012	1 651 000

== See also ==
- List of newspapers in South Africa
- The World
