= Michiel le Roux =

South African businessman (born 1949)

CEO of Capitec Bank
- In office 2001–2004

Chairman of Capitec Bank
- In office 2007–2016

Chairman of Millennium Trust
- Incumbent
- Assumed office 2010

Personal details
- Born: Michiel Scholtz du Pré le Roux; 20 May 1949 (age 77) South Africa
- Other political affiliations: Democratic Alliance (DA)
- Education: Stellenbosch University
- Occupation: Banker; Businessman; Philanthropist

Michiel Scholtz du Pré le Roux (born 20 May 1949) is a South African billionaire businessman and philanthropist who co-founded Capitec Bank. He was the bank's inaugural chief executive officer (CEO) from 2001 to 2004 and later served as its chairman from 2007 to 2016.

== Early life and career ==
Le Roux was born on 20 May 1949. He matriculated in 1966 at Hoërskool Alberton in Alberton North on the East Rand, where his father was a mine ventilation engineer. He went on to Stellenbosch University, graduating in 1972 with a Bachelor of Commerce and Bachelor of Laws. As a student he lived at Eendrag.

After university, he began his career at Distillers Corporation, Anton Rupert's Stellenbosch-based liquor company, and rose through the ranks to become its managing director. In 1994, Christo Wiese recruited him to serve as managing director of Boland Bank. In around 1998, he resigned under acrimonious circumstances, which ultimately culminated in a lawsuit.

== Capitec Bank ==
Viewing Boland Bank's approach as "archaic," le Roux became interested in new banking business models. He secured the financial banking of the PSG Group, whose founder, Chris Otto, had been his first-year roommate at Eendrag, and in 2000 he recruited much of Boland Bank's senior management, including his former Distillers colleague Riaan Stassen, to join the new bank. The bank launched in 2001, initially called Daxacom, and it listed on the Johannesburg Stock Exchange as Capitec Bank Holdings on 18 February 2002.

In its early years Capitec pursued the low-income retail market with substantial success. Le Roux was the inaugural chief executive officer until 2004, when he was succeeded by Stassen, and he later served as chairman of the board between 2007 and 2016. As of 2024, he retained a board seat and 11 per cent of the bank's shares; Forbes regarded him as the 19th richest man in Africa was a net worth of approximately $1.1 billion.

== Political activities and philanthropy ==
In recent years Le Roux has been the largest single reported donor to the Democratic Alliance (DA), typically through his private companies, Fynbos Ekwiteit and Fynbos Kapitaal. His ties to the party extend to a close personal relationship with party stalwart Helen Zille, and after the 2019 general election he (along with party insiders Tony Leon and Ryan Coetzee) was appointed to an internal review panel that apprised the party's performance in the election and recommended that Mmusi Maimane should resign as party leader. Between 2021 and 2023, he donated over R50 million to the party, the largest donation disclosed by any individual. He remained a major donor to the party ahead of the 2024 general election, which won the DA a role in the coalition Government of National Unity. Ahead of the 2024 elections he also made substantial donations to Roger Jardine's Change Starts Now initiative.

Le Roux's family company, Fynbos Ekwiteit, is a member with Ardagh Africa of the Red Disa Investment consortium, which holds a 74-per-cent controlling stake in the Western Province Rugby Union. Red Disa was formed to acquire the stake in 2023 when the union was in dire financial straits. In 2010, Le Roux founded the Millennium Trust, a non-profit organisation which has provided sizable patronage to media and civil society organisations including amaBhungane, GroundUp, Corruption Watch, the Daily Maverick, and the Institute of Race Relations. It is also the patron of Jan Braai's Braai Day initiative.

== Personal life ==
Le Roux lives in Stellenbosch with his wife and children. He is a trustee of the law faculty at his alma mater. His son, also called Michiel, is the author of a 2010 memoir called The Misadventures of a COPE Volunteer: My Crash Course in Politics, about his experience volunteering for the opposition Congress of the People during the 2009 general election campaign.
