= Reitz, Free State =

Reitz
- Location within Free State (South African province) Location within South Africa
- Coordinates: 27°48′S 28°26′E
- Country: South Africa
- Province: Free State
- District: Thabo Mofutsanyane
- Municipality: Nketoana
- Township: Petsana
- Established: 1890

Area
  - Total: 25.7 km^{2} (9.9 sq mi)
- Elevation: 1,630 m (5,350 ft)

Population (2011)
  - Total: 20,183
  - Density: 785/km^{2} (2,030/sq mi)

Racial makeup (2011) (Reitz and Petsana combined)
  - Black African: 90.0%
  - White: 9.1%
  - Coloured: 0.3%
  - Indian/Asian: 0.2%
  - Other: 0.4%

First languages (2011)
  - Sotho: 66.9%
  - Zulu: 19.9%
  - Afrikaans: 9.2%
  - Sign language: 1.1%
  - Other: 3.0%
- Time zone: UTC+2 (SAST)
- Postal code (street): 9810
- PO box: 9810
- Area code: 058

Reitz is a small maize, wheat and cattle farming town located in the east of the Free State province of South Africa.

== Town and township ==
The original town, Reitz, lies upon the northwestern hillside. On the opposite hill lies the town's township, Petsana.

The population data of Reitz (as of the 2011 Census):

    Population = 3362

    Population group:
    White (54.1%)
    Black African (43%)
    Other (1.6%)
    Indian or Asian (0.7%)
    Coloured (0.62%)

    First language:
    Afrikaans (55.24%)
    Sesotho (31.96%)
    isiZulu (5.45%)
    English (2.88%)
    Other (1.39%)
    isiXhosa (1.01%)
    Setswana (0.76%)
    Sign language (0.76%)
    Sepedi (0.25%)
    isiNdebele (0.25%)
    Xitsonga (0.03%)

Petsana's population data (as of the 2011 Census) is:

    Population = 16,821

    Population group:
    Black African (99.44%)
    Coloured (0.22%)
    Other (0.12%)
    Indian or Asian (0.12%)
    White (0.10%)

    First language:
    Sesotho (73.42%)
    isiZulu (22.56%)
    Sign language (1.14%)
    isiXhosa (1.05%)
    Afrikaans (0.61%)
    English (0.48%)
    Other (0.32%)
    isiNdebele (0.15%)
    Setswana (0.11%)
    Xitsonga (0.10%)
    Sepedi (0.05%)
    Siswati (0.01%)

== Location ==
Reitz is located in the north-eastern part of the Free State province, 300 kilometres (190 mi) north-east of Bloemfontein and 180 kilometres (110 mi) south of Johannesburg. It lies roughly halfway between the towns of Bethlehem and Frankfort, at an elevation of 1,630 metres (5,350 ft).

== Local Economy ==
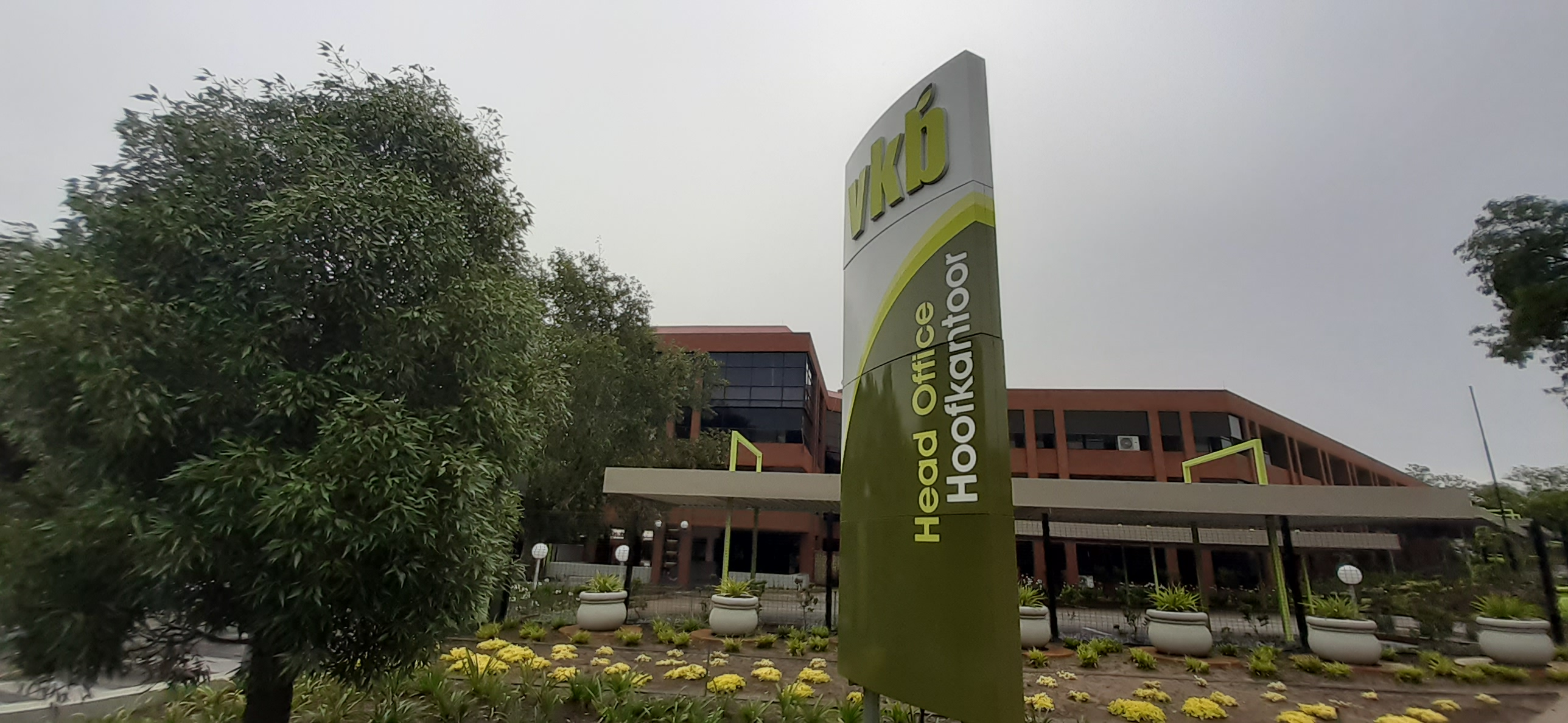
VKB Head Office in Reitz

Reitz is a mainly residential area with schools, small shops and businesses, but very few industrial work sites. Most of the working population either goes out daily to work on farms in the area or work in town. Reitz has an industrial area, most notably the steel and farming equipment construction company, Van Zyl's Staalwerke. Reitz is also home to the headquarters of the co-op group, VKB. The VKB Group is an agricultural enterprise that was establishment in 1919, and provides services and products to the agricultural market. Another company that employs a lot of local workers is Grain Field Chickens. A subsidiary of VKB Group, Grain Field is a technologically advanced abattoir, with between 800 000 and 850 000 chickens slaughtered per week. In May 2023 VKB Group announced their official merger with GWK.

== Agriculture ==
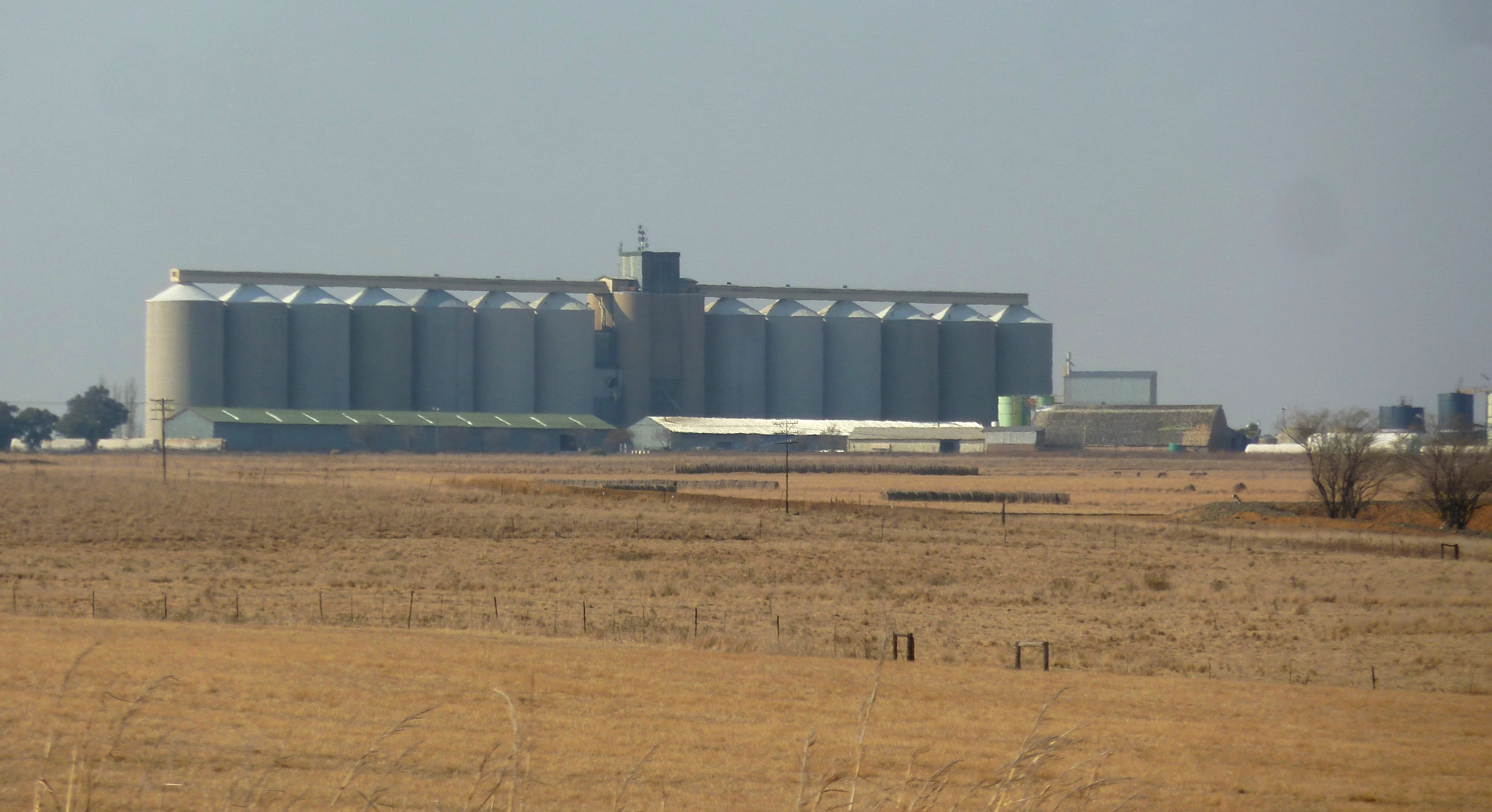
VKB's grain silos at the hamlet of Daniëlsrus, some 25 km south of Reitz

The town has one of the largest maize silos in the southern hemisphere and is a major maize growing community.

== Tjheseho Skills Development Centre ==
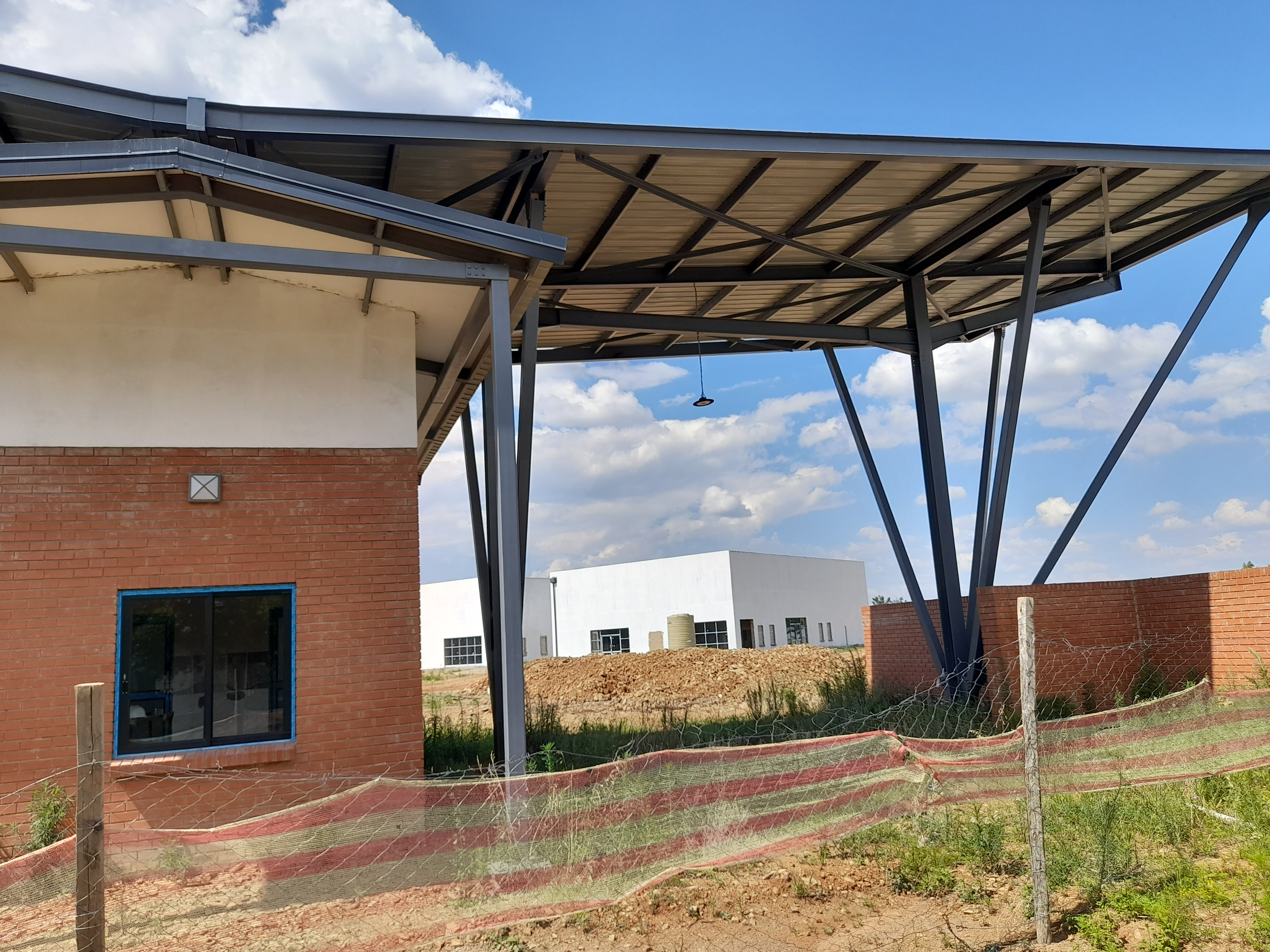
Unfineshed Tjheseho Skills Development Centre,Jan 2025

On 30 April 2024 Minister of Higher Education, Science and Innovation, Prof Blade Nzimande and Free State MEC Mr Makalo Mohale launched a Community Education Infrastructure Programme at Tjheseho Skills Development Centre in Reitz. The Community College was supposed to open its doors in January 2025 and admit 5000 learners as Blade Nzimande words,this has not happened.

The Tjheseho Skills Development Centre will serve as a multifaceted hub for skills enhancement, with a primary focus on agricultural simulation. Training will also be provided in sectors such as agriculture, business, transport, trade, manufacturing, and community services. In January 2024 a subcontractor threatened to stop work until he received what he was owed owing to allegations of corruption.

== Leifo-Iziko School ==
In August 2024 Leifo-Iziko High School became champions of the Kay Motsepe League, becoming the second school to do so from Nketoana Local Municipality after Ikaheng-Zakheni from Mamafubedu won it in 2023. Leifo-Iziko and Paarl Gimnasium both represented South Africa in Singapore in the global netball stage for high schools, where Paarl Gimnasium took the first position and gold, and Leifo they came out in third place, getting a bronze medal for their efforts.

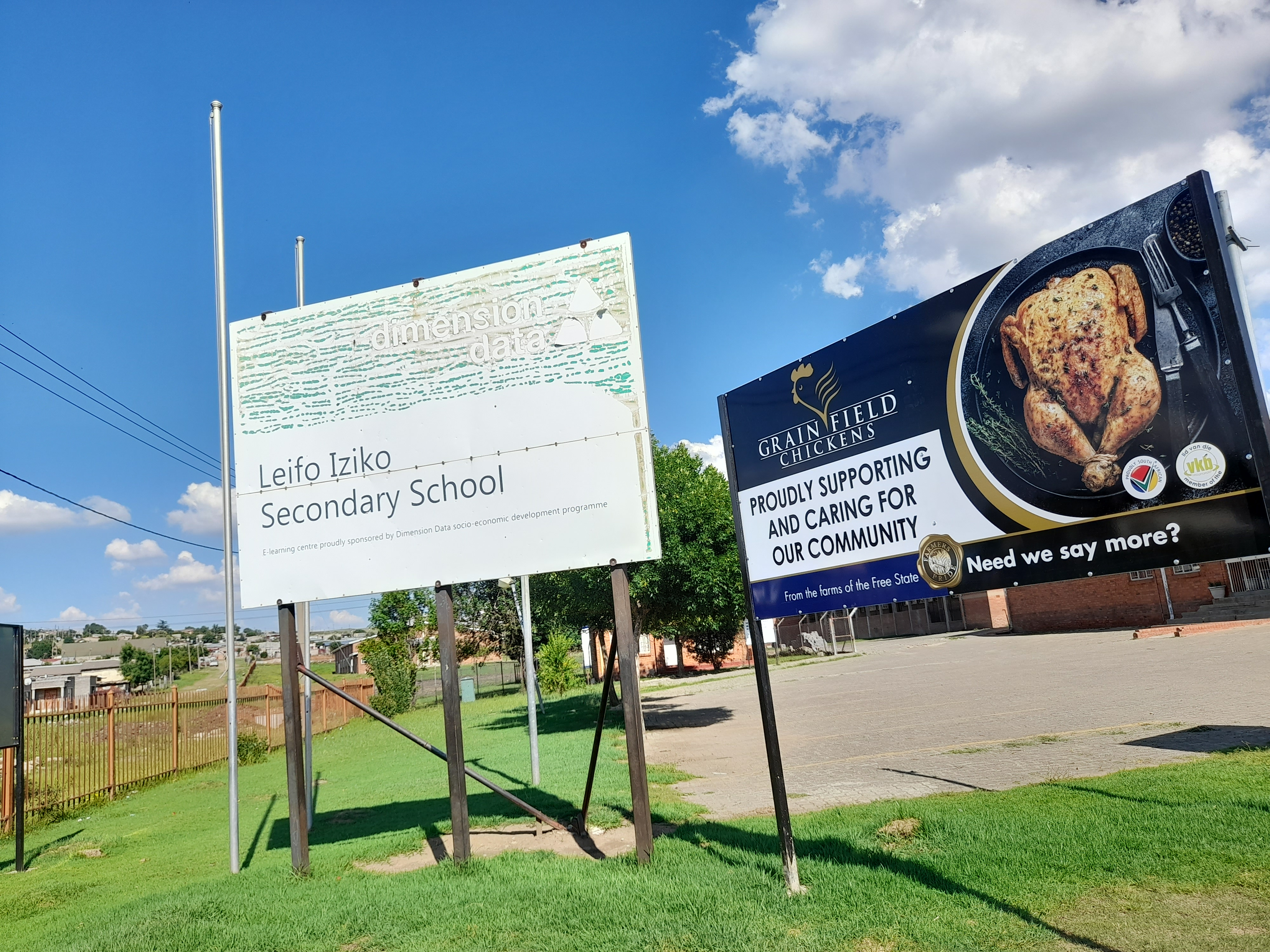
Sekolo se phahameng sa Leifo Iziko,Petsana

== History and Name ==
Founded in 1889, the town was previously known as Singer's Post, its name was changed to Amsterdam, and again to its current name Reitz after the Orange Free State president, Francis William Reitz. The area was originally inhabited by the Khoisan peoples until colonisation by the Basotho, and later the British and Afrikaans.

=== Nearby towns ===
The nearest settlements or towns and their respective distances are listed here:

- Daniëlsrus – 25 km
- Bethlehem – 49.9 km
- Frankfort – 58.2 km
- Heilbron – 75.5 km
- Villiers – 87.5 km
- Vrede – 90.3 km
- Tweeling 30 km

== Notable people from Reitz ==
- George Fivaz - Former Police National Commissioner January 29, 1995 - 2000
- Thuso Motaung - Lesedi FM Presenter
- Maglera Doe Boy - Rapper
- Dr. Jacob Mfaniselwa Nhlapo - Journalist, political propagandist, and first Black South African with two doctorates.

== Helpful Links ==
- https://web.archive.org/web/20090206235601/http://www.routes.co.za/fs/reitz/index.html
