= The World (South African newspaper) =

Johannesburg black daily newspaper

The World, originally named The Bantu World, was the black daily newspaper of Johannesburg, South Africa. It is famous for publishing Sam Nzima's iconic photograph of Hector Pieterson, taken during the Soweto uprising of 16 June 1976.

== History ==
The Bantu World was founded in April 1932 for an intended audience of black middle-class elite by Bertram Paver, a white ex-farmer. Paver modeled The Bantu World after British tabloids. The newspaper had a national distribution, in contrast to the primarily local reach of previous black-owned papers. Half of the 38 shareholders were black Africans by the end of 1932. Each issue consisted of about 20 pages, of which 13 were written in English, and the rest in a variety of indigenous languages. The caption for an image from historian Luli Callinicos' Working Life (1987) suggests that The Bantu World operated out of the western Johannesburg suburb of Westdene.

The Bantu World's first editor was Selope Thema who served until 1952 followed by Jacob Mfaniselwa Nhlapo. The newspaper was the first in South Africa to place news rather than advertisements on the front page. A women's page was introduced in October 1932. The paper ran a beauty competition from November 1932 to March 1933, for which readers could vote. A favourite debate in the paper during the 1930s was what constituted the "African modern girl". Similar discussions of feminine beauty intended to attract female readers.

In June 1933, the Argus Printing Company (established 1889) took over Paver's company, Bantu Press Limited, and so also the ownership of The Bantu World. Argus monopolized the black press through its 10 weekly papers.

The World merged with Ilanga lase Natal (Natal Sun) in 1935, under Selope-Thema's editorship. Ilanga lase Natal was a Zulu-language newspaper founded in 1903 by John Langalibalele Dube in Durban. The staff of the combined newspaper included Herbert Isaac Ernest Dhlomo (1903-1956), Zulu educationist, author, poet, playwright, and former Librarian-Organiser of The Carnegie Non-European Library in Germiston, near Johannesburg. Dhlomo had worked at Ilanga lase Natal from 1941.

Under Dr. Jacob Mfaniselwa Nhlapo, editor from 1953 to 1957, the name of the newspaper was changed to its current name, The World. During the 1950s The World focused on sex, soccer, and crime. After the death of Nhlapo in 1957, the newspaper was without an editor for a period of time.

After the Sharpeville massacre, The World provided relatively non-political coverage until 1974. M. T. Moerane, editor from 1962 to 1973, admitted as much in his farewell speech. This was partly because the Argus company employed a white editorial director to curtail black editors. In similar fashion, Drum (founded 1951), and Golden City Post (started in 1955), were also aimed at black readers yet it had white editors.

But the political climate in South Africa changed partly due to black Africans in Mozambique winning their independence from Portugal in 1975 after a military struggle. The increasing political reportage of The World reflected this change.

Tselito Percy Peter Qoboza (1938-1988) became editor in chief of The World in 1974. Qoboza had first joined the paper as a journalist in 1963, rising to news editor in 1967. He was arrested without being charged in June 1976 for 18 hours, for condemning the violent state reaction to the protests. The same happened again in March 1978, as part of the government's repression of 18 black organizations. This time Qoboza was released after six months due to international pressure on the South African government. He eventually left South Africa and lived in the United States until 1985, when he returned as editor of City Press, a black weekly newspaper.

Joseph (Joe) Latakgomo acted as editor while Qoboza was abroad, but had to submit to editorial director Charles Still.

Masana Sam Nzima (1934-) began working as a full-time photojournalist for The World in 1968, after having done some freelance work for the paper before. After snapping his well-known picture of Pieterson, a friend in the police warned him that he was a target for the Security Branch of the police. He fled from his home in Chiawelo, Soweto on the night of the warning to Lillydale, the village of his birth near Nelspruit. There the Nelspruit security police kept Nzima under overt police surveillance for three months. In 1979, he became a member of the legislative assembly of the Gazankulu bantustan, by invitation of Chief Minister Hudson Ntsanwisi. Nzima struggled for over 20 years before he was granted copyright for his photograph of young Pieterson. He runs a photography school in Bushbuck Ridge.

On 24 February 1976, The World reported that the defeat by Cuban and Angolan troops of South African defence force units operating in Angola had brought home the possibility of total liberation.

The World and its weekend edition was banned by Minister of Justice Jimmy Kruger in 1977. Qoboza and The World's editorial staff were detained in Modderbee Prison in Benoni on 19 October 1977. One of the detainees was Aggrey Klaaste (1940-2004), later editor of The Sowetan. Klaaste suggested that one of the motivations for the closure of The World was that The Committee of Ten was formed in the newspaper's offices to help run Soweto after the 1976 protests. Six of the newspapers' reporters disappeared in the late 1970s after being arrested by the police.

Former staff of The World like Latakgomo and Klaaste went on to work for Post Transvaal which the Argus company launched in 1978. When Post was closed down in 1980 after a strike, they migrated in 1981 to The Sowetan which is still published today.

== See also ==
- Aggrey Klaaste
- Jacob Mfaniselwa Nhlapo
- Selope Thema
- Soweto
- Soweto Riots
- The Bantu Men's Social Centre

== Note ==
- "Bantu" literally means "people." Because it was used extensively by state officials and in state departments overseeing the implementation of apartheid, "Bantu" achieved a pejorative value in South Africa, where it is seldom (if ever) used today. Originally the word referred to a system of related languages distributed throughout Sub-Saharan Africa, all of whom use "-ntu-" (as in abantu, umuntu).

== Other sources and further reading ==
- Callinicos, Luli. Working Life - Factories, Township and Popular Culture, 1886-1940. Johannesburg: Ravan Press, 1987.
- Gleijeses, Piero. A History Worthy of Pride, Tricontinental, No. 158, Year 38, 2004.
- Switzer, Les. Bantu World and the Origins of a Captive African Commercial Press, in Les Switzer (ed.), South Africa’s Alternative Press: Voices of Protest and Resistance, 1880s-1960s. Cambridge: Cambridge University Press, 1997.
- Masilela, Ntongela. New Negro Modernity and New African Modernity, paper presented to =The Black Atlantic: Literatures, Histories, Cultures Forum, Zurich, 2003.

== Additional resources ==
Microfilm copies of The Bantu World can be found in the following locations:

- the Herbert Lehman Social Sciences Library at Columbia University has editions dating from April 1932
- the African Studies Library at the University of Cape Town has editions dating from 9 April to 28 December 1946 .

Microfilm copies of Ilanga lase Natal dating from 1903 to 1935 can be found at the African Studies Library at the University of Cape Town .
