= Chika Oduah =

Nigerian-American journalist (born 1986)

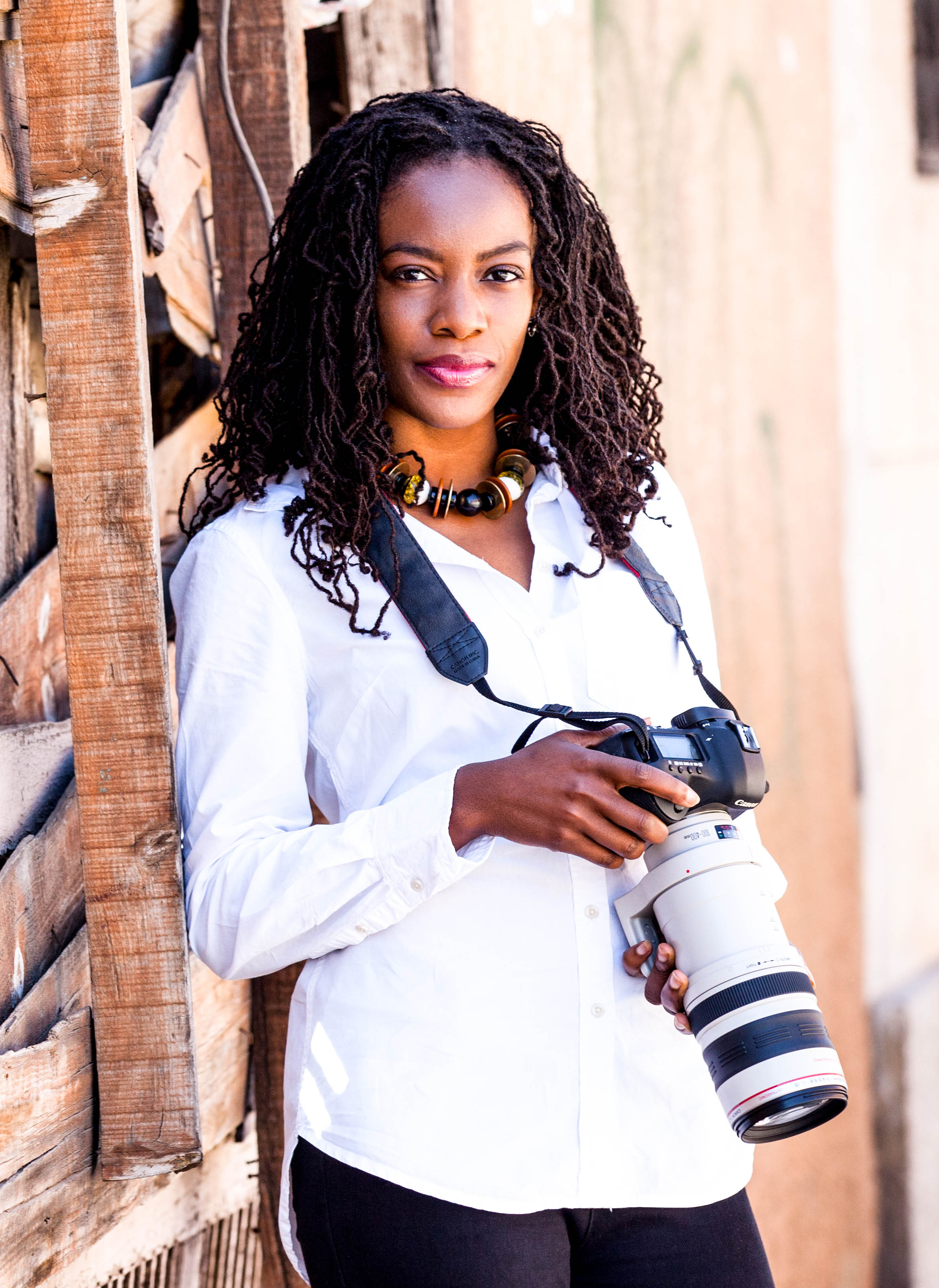
- Born: Chikaodinaka Sandra Oduah; 14 March 1986 (age 40); Ogbaru, Anambra State, Nigeria
- Education: Georgia State University (BA); Medill School of Journalism (MSc
- Occupation: Journalist
- Years active: 2010–present
- Awards: Winner of the 2015 African Story Challenge award by the African Media Initiative and the International Center for Journalists.
- Website: chika-oduah.com

Chikaodinaka Sandra Oduah (born 14 March 1986) is a Nigerian-American journalist, poet and cultural entrepreneur who has worked as a television news producer, correspondent, writer and photographer. She is the founder of Zikora Media & Arts, which operates as a media production company and a cultural institution. Oduah was formerly a correspondent for VICE News. Known for her unique human-focused ethnographic reporting style with an anthropological approach, she was awarded a CNN Multichoice African Journalist Award in 2016. Upon the abduction of 276 schoolgirls by the terrorist group Boko Haram in Chibok, northeastern Nigeria, she was the first international journalist to visit and spend extensive time in the remote community of Chibok. Her thorough and exclusive coverage of the mass kidnapping won her the Trust Women "Journalist of The Year Award" from the Thomson Reuters Foundation in 2014. Oduah's reporting explores culture, history, conflict, human rights, and development to capture the complexities, hopes and everyday realities of Africans and people of African descent.

== Early life and education ==
Oduah is of the Igbo ethnic group. She was born as the eldest of seven children to Dr. Emmanuel and Mercy Oduah on March 14, 1986, in Ogbaru, Anambra State, and moved to Metro Atlanta, United States, with her family at the age of two. During her time in high school, she joined VOX newspaper as a staff reporter with particular on stories about immigrants and refugees in Atlanta.

In 2004, Oduah worked at the Center for Pan-Asian Community Services in Doraville, Georgia, where she taught refugee teenagers from Sudan, Afghanistan, Liberia, Iraq, Bosnia, Rwanda and South Sudan.

Between 2004 and 2008, she attended Georgia State University, where she studied film, anthropology and broadcast journalism and was awarded a Bachelor of Arts degree in telecommunications broadcast journalism and a Bachelor of Arts degree in anthropology. During her time in Georgia State University, she served as Vice President of the University's chapter of the Society for Professional Journalists, wrote for the Signal Newspaper and contributed to the university radio station, WRAS Album 88.5FM. She is also an alumna of the Medill School of Journalism of Northwestern University, where she received her Master of Science degree in 2010 after studying broadcast journalism.

== Career ==
In 2009, she worked as a commercial photographer in Atlanta and in 2010 she relocated to Nairobi, Kenya, to work as a television news reporter and documentary features producer for K24, where she met Jeff Koinange. She also worked for National Broadcasting Corporation at the Rockefeller Center in New York, where she reported for The Grio. She later worked at Sahara Reporters.

Oduah relocated to Nigeria in 2012 and began working with Al Jazeera as a reporter and television news producer. She also worked with CNN, the Associated Press, Voice of America and the English language channel of France 24.

Oduah's work has been published in notable media platforms including The New York Times, The Guardian, Al Jazeera, The Daily Beast, CNN and The Huffington Post.

In 2014, Oduah rose to recognition after her coverage of the Chibok schoolgirls kidnapping, for which she won the 2014 Trust Women "Journalist of The Year Award" from the Thomson Reuters Foundation. One of her stories published in The Atlantic, titled "In the Land of Nigeria's Kidnapped Girls", saw her selected as a finalist of the 2015 Livingston Awards for Young Journalists.

In 2017, Oduah relocated to Dakar, Senegal. She made her Al Jazeera onscreen debut when Al Jazeera broadcast a documentary in November 2015 about breast cancer that she reported alongside Ghanaian undercover investigative journalist, Anas Aremeyaw Anas. Oduah has emphasized the importance of historical and cultural context in her reporting, as well as building relationships with interview subjects to document their experiences with accuracy and compassion. Since 2012, Oduah has covered the ongoing Islamist insurgency of Boko Haram in northeastern Nigeria. Her reporting highlights the plight of women and children with exclusive coverage on orphans, mediation talks, escapees and wives of jihadists In 2017, she launched Biafran War Memories, a digital archive that seeks to preserve the history and first-hand accounts of the Nigerian-Biafran War. In 2023, Oduah launched Zikora Media Arts. In Igbo, zikora means "to show the world". The organization’s motto is to show the world what it means to be unapologetically African. Zikora operates six departments, also known as creative branches, to accomplish its goals.These include literary arts, performance arts, an artists collective, events, film and TV, and journalism.

== Awards and recognition ==
She was the winner of the 2015 African Story Challenge award by the African Media Initiative and the International Center for Journalists for her coverage of the aftermath of a 2010 lead poison outbreak in Nigeria, a project which also won her the Dow Technology & Innovation Reporting Award at the 2016 CNN MultiChoice African Journalist Awards. On March 8, 2016, she was listed in YNaija's "Nigeria's 100 Most Inspiring Women", before she went on to be voted the category winner of The Future Awards and EbonyLife Prize for Journalism at the eleventh edition of The Future Awards. In September 2016, she became the inaugural recipient of the Young Reporter for a Sustainable Future Award from the International Center for Journalists in partnership with the United Nations Foundation.

She won the 2018 Percy Qoboza Award, an annual honour from The National Association of Black Journalists in the United States given to the journalist who best exemplifies the spirit of Percy Qoboza.
