= Aggrey Klaaste =

Aggrey Zola Klaaste OMSG (6 January 1940 – 19 June 2004) was a South African newspaper journalist and editor. He was best known for being editor of the Soweto-based newspaper, the Sowetan, from 1988 to 2002. He introduced the concept of "nation building" while editor of the Sowetan and spent much of his time and energy promoting the idea.

== Early life ==
Klaaste was born in Kimberley as one of eight children, in a township called Green Point in the Northern Cape. His father Tobias Klaaste was born in 1886 and died in 1973. His mother Regina Mantoa was born in 1900 and died in 1986. When he was three, his family moved to Sophiatown in Johannesburg, where his father became a clerk at a gold mine. Klaaste attended school in Newclare (previously known as Western Native Township), before moving onto Western High School, a predimoninatly coloured area at the time.

In 1955, when Sophiatown was dismantled, the family moved to Meadowlands in Soweto. He began studying at the University of the Witwatersrand in 1958 and graduated in 1960 with a Bachelor of Arts degree. Klaaste was one of the last blacks to have completed a degree at the university before it was closed to blacks by apartheid laws. In 1960 the apartheid government passed a law called the Extension of University Education Act, which meant some of the best universities in South Africa were reserved for the white minority. Klaaste attended WITS with South African literary luminaries like Miriam Tlali, the first black woman in South Africa to publish a novel in English.

== Career ==
After graduating he became a journalist, first with Drum magazine and subsequently with The World (which was banned by the South African government in 1977) and The Post (which became the Sowetan in 1981). While working as an intern for Drum magazine, whose celebrated writers had by this time moved on to different things, Klaaste's lifestyle emulated that of his predecessors. He soon battled with alcoholism. In 1961 he took on a permanent job as a writer for Bantu World. Due to heavy drinking, he struggled to hold on to permanent work for too long. He found himself back at Drum in 1964, where he covered the famous Rivonia Trial. In 1977 he was arrested along with The World editor at the time, Percy Qoboza, and spent nine months in jail. This was a crackdown led by the Special Branch police in an effort to shut down two of the most popular black publications at the time, The World and Weekend World.

== Nation building ==
In the late 1980s South Africa was a bedrock for mass protest action met with violence from the apartheid police. By 1988 Aggrey Klaaste was the editor of The Sowetan (previously The World) which was the largest circulating black newspaper in the country at the time. The ANC accused The Sowetan of showing preferential treatment and being pro-PAC and Black Consciousness. With these two factors to consider, Klaaste decided to shift the newspaper's editorial policy and began sparking a dialogue around nation building. He wrote at length in his column On the Line about a non-racial South Africa and practical measures with which black people can make sense of apartheid on a daily basis. Klaaste was also known to be an active member of his community in Meadowlands, Soweto. Klaaste faced more criticism for his attempts at unifying a divided country, particularly from the Black Consciousness Movement, who accused him of ‘selling-out’ by spreading ideas of a non-racial society.

Prior to his death, he was an executive with the black empowerment company, New Africa Investment Ltd. (NAIL) as well as the chairperson of the Johannesburg Tourism Company. He was voted 58th in the Top 100 Great South Africans in 2004.

== See also ==
- Can Themba
- United Democratic Front (South Africa)
