= Thuso Motaung =

South African radio presenter

Thuso Motaung is a South African radio presenter. He works for Lesedi FM, the South African Broadcasting Corporation (SABC). Motaung is known for his following as a presenter of a Sunday gospel show called Makgulong a Matala and Jwale ke Nako during weekdays.

== Early life ==
Thuso Motaung was born on 18 December 1959 in Petsana, Reitz, Free State. Motaung is a teacher by profession, and he taught at farm schools before transitioning into broadcasting in the early 1980s.

=== Radio presenting ===
He began working at Lesedi FM, owned by the South African Broadcasting Corporation (SABC), in 1983, rising through the ranks to become a veteran presenter by 2024.

=== Legal issues ===
In 2006 Motaung and his wife were accused of defrauding the SABC of more than R32 million with their power mix product. In 2007 the court returned 15 cars that were taken from Motaung. Thuso Motaung and his wife, Mamontha Motaung, have been accused of influencing Lesedi FM's sought-after slot for crossover song of 2025 to 2026.

== Recognition ==
In 2018 Motaung received the Telkom Radio Award for his work at Lesedi FM.
