= Roger Jardine =

South African Business Executive

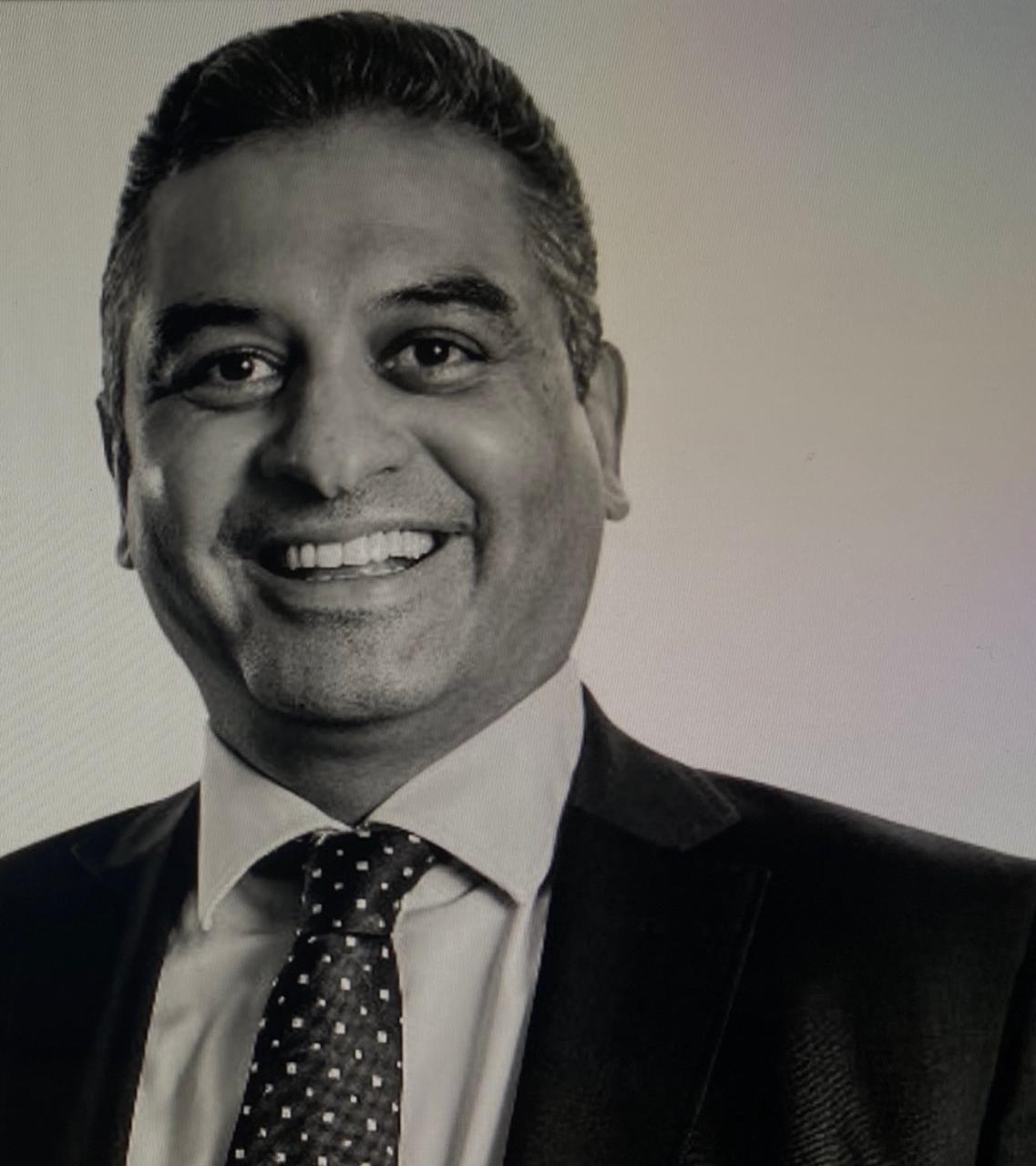

Chairman Old Mutual Limited

Personal details
- Born: September 13, 1965 (age 60) Riverlea, Johannesburg, South Africa
- Parent(s): Bill Jardine and Anne Jardine
- Education: Haverford College, Wayne State University
- Occupation: Businessman, Corporate Leader, Anti- Apartheid Activist, Philanthropist

William Rodger “Roger” Jardine (born 13 September 1965) is a South African business executive, former government official and social activist.

At age 29, Jardine became the Director General of South Africa's Department of Arts, Culture, Science and Technology, becoming the youngest director general in the country’s history, surpassing the previous record held by Niel Barnard. He contributed to policy work on nuclear disarmament in South Africa. and the first White paper on science and technology in 1996, which contributed to the later establishment of new research facilities and infrastructure such as the Southern African Large Telescope, Technology Innovation Agency and South African National Space Agency.

Jardine was appointed chairman of South African investment, savings, insurance, and banking group Old Mutual to replace retiring Chairman Trevor Manuel from June 2026. Jardine is also chairman and co-founder of start-up Mura Space, a member of the Global Spaceport Alliance. Mura’s "activities are aimed at supporting a globally competitive, orbital and sub-orbital space launch value chain in southern Africa".

He was the chairperson of FirstRand, a financial institution, and chair of the Centre for Development and Enterprise, a South African think tank.

== Early life and education ==
Roger Jardine was born in Riverlea, Johannesburg, to Bill Jardine and Anne Jardine. He has three brothers His father, Bill Jardine, was involved in anti-apartheid activism and contributed to sports unification in South Africa. During his high school years, Jardine was involved in anti-apartheid activities, including boycotts and protests against the tricameral parliament, and was an activist in the United Democratic Front (UDF). In early June 1981, while a 15-year-old pupil at Riverlea Secondary School, Jardine made news when he was seriously injured by a tear gas canister during a riot police crackdown on students protesting the detention of a neighbouring school's head boy.

He earned his BSc in Physics from Haverford College in 1989 and his MSc in Radiological Physics from Wayne State University in 1991.

== Public sector and policy work ==
After returning to South Africa in 1992, Jardine worked as the National Coordinator of Science and Technology Policy for the African National Congress (ANC). In 1995, the Government appointed him director-general of South Africa's Department of Arts, Culture, Science and Technology at the age of 29. His responsibilities included reviewing science councils and addressing funding issues. Jardine has been vocal against corruption and leadership issues in South African politics and has spoken at the University of Witwatersrand (Wits) Business School.

== Corporate leadership ==
In September 2025, Jardine was appointed to the board of Old Mutual as independent non-executive director.

Jardine first transitioned into the private sector, as CEO of Kagiso Media, Aveng Group, and Primedia. He was the chairperson of FirstRand, a financial institution that offers a range of financial services in South Africa and other African countries, between April 2018 and November 2023.

He stepped down from FirstRand in November 2023, and announced at the time "he wishes to explore options to best serve South Africa and this will require his full attention".

== Change Starts Now ==
In December 2023, Jardine founded the political movement Change Starts Now, to contest the 2024 national elections. Jardine launched the movement in Riverlea, in Johannesburg West. He formed the movement alongside former UDF leader and speechwriter Murphy Morobe, editor and activist Mark Heywood, Nicole Fritz of the Helen Suzman Foundation, and anti-apartheid activist and Nelson Mandela's former doctor, Dr Aslam Dasoo.

Willie Esterhuyse, who played an important role in the negotiations leading up to the transition to a democracy in South Africa, remarked in an interview published in Die Burger newspaper on 15 February 2024 that "From political history we learn that countries are saved by organized middle groups. But then you have to have the right leaders." and "maybe" 'Roger Jardine with his Change Starts Now party is the man who could lead such a "revolt" of the non-racial middle class. But Esterhuyse emphasizes that ideally three or four strong leaders should emerge. "They will have to convert the anger of the middle class into strong support at the ballot box. And then they will have to put practical plans into action."

In response to the launch of the party's Change Charter election manifesto launched in Kliptown on 19 February 2024, the CEO of Sibanye-Stillwater, one of South Africa's top four private sector employers, Neal Froneman said “It is one of the most credible plans I have seen for realising South Africa’s potential… I for one would be prepared to pay taxes that are needed to support the reconstruction and growth fund with real confidence that the money would be used meaningfully to secure a prosperous future. Implementation of the CSN Charter would build a national unified identity that we can all identify with”

Some journalists speculated that private funders may have offered the members of the 'Moonshot Pact Coalition' one billion Rand to take Jardine as their presidential candidate. In response, one critic called it "a brazen attempt by a small group of very rich people to buy political influence".

=== Change Starts Now Ballot Access ===
Change Starts Now did not make it onto the ballot after the Constitutional Court of South Africa dismissed an application by the Independent Candidates Association, which had sought to increase the number of National Assembly seats available to independent candidates from 200 to 350. The party released a statement noting its decision not to contest was further "informed by the determination of the Constitutional Court that a ruling on the signature requirement for unrepresented political parties in the upcoming election was not urgent. The party was also deeply concerned about the practical implementation of the new novel signature requirement for unrepresented parties."

=== Change Starts Now Funding ===
The party's funding declarations to the Electoral Commission of South Africa, in accordance with now defunct local party funding transparency laws, show donations totalling R35 820 000 (from three donors) to finance campaign operations for the period 2023/2024.

== Philanthropy and community involvement ==
Jardine supports various charitable organizations and formerly was the Chairman of the Centre for Development and Enterprise. He has also been involved in initiatives aimed at combating racism and xenophobia in Gauteng province.

== Aveng ==
Roger Jardine was the CEO of Aveng Group between 2008 and 2013. During his tenure, the company faced allegations of collusion surrounding events that predated his appointment. Jardine stepped down after the completion of regulatory investigations, whereafter he gave a public lecture at the University of Witwatersrand entitled "Rejecting Collusion And Corruption: Where To For The Government And The Private Sector”.

== Sports and rugby ==
The Jardine family has been involved in rugby. Jardine was on the board of Sharks Rugby Union for over a decade.

== Personal life ==
Jardine has been married to Christa Kuljian since 1991. In the 1980s Kuljian worked for Senator Edward Kennedy and in the early 1990s moved to South Africa to work for the Mott Foundation.

Kuljian is also a writer and author of Sanctuary (Jacana, 2013) and Darwin’s Hunch (Jacana, 2016), which was shortlisted for the Sunday Times Alan Paton Award for Nonfiction in 2017. In 2024, Kuljian published "Our Science, Ourselves: How Gender, Race, and Social Movements Shaped the Study of Science”, a nonfiction work published by the University of Massachusetts Press, as part of its Activist Studies of Science & Technology series.

Christa is currently a Research Associate at the Wits Institute for Social and Economic Research (WiSER). Her writing has appeared in many publications including the Mail and Guardian and The Johannesburg Review of Books. Christa was a Ruth First Fellow in 2010 and gave the Steve Biko Bioethics Lecture in 2023. They have two adult children.
