= Nasrec =

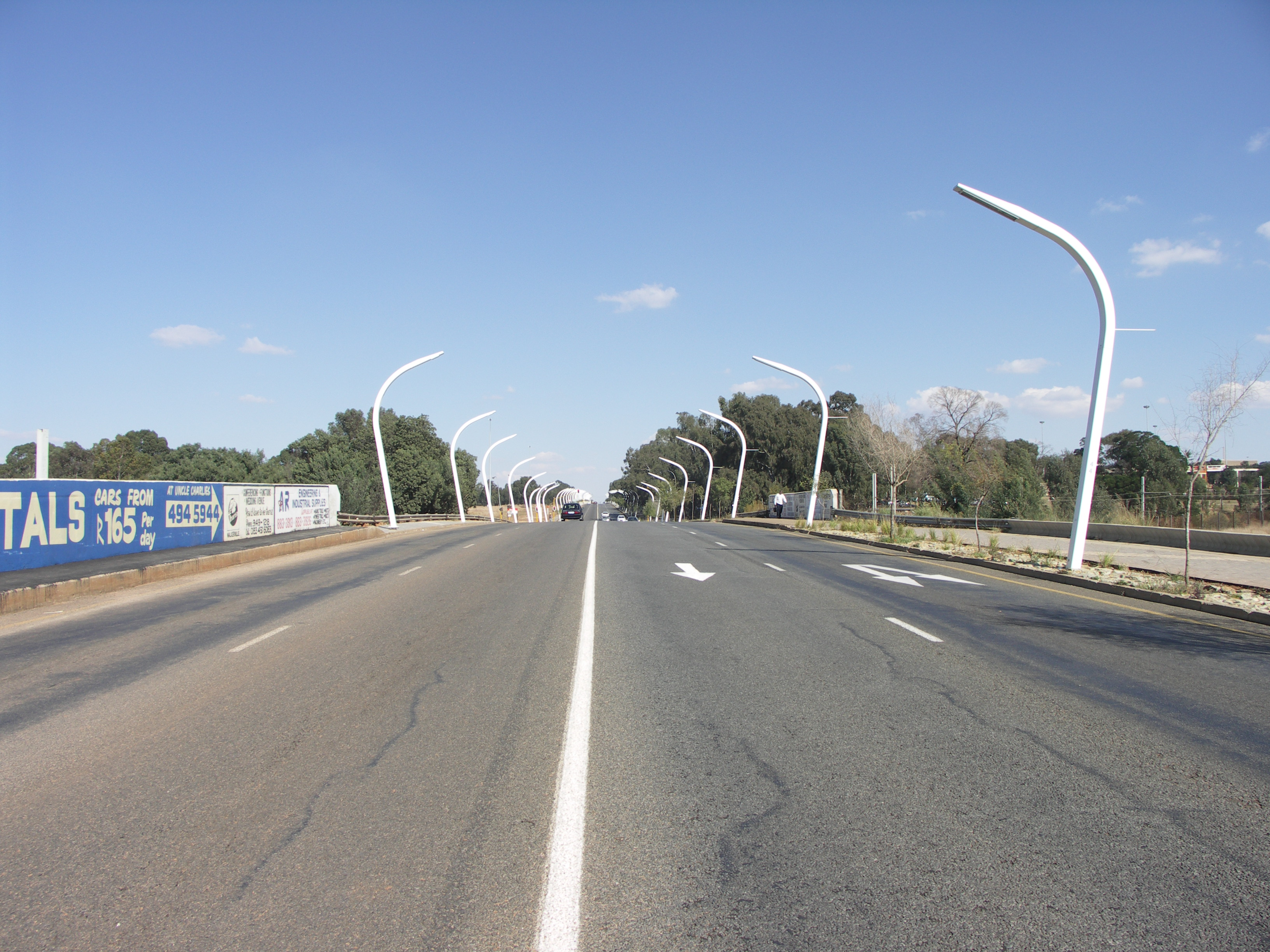
- Nasrec Road next to Soccer City

- Location within Gauteng Location within South Africa
- Coordinates: 26.24°S 27.98°E
- Country: South Africa
- Province: Gauteng
- Municipality: City of Johannesburg
- Main Place: Johannesburg

Area
  - Total: 1.83 km^{2} (0.71 sq mi)

Population (2011)
  - Total: 5
  - Density: 2.7/km^{2} (7.1/sq mi)

Racial makeup (2011)
  - Black African: 100.0%

First languages (2011)
  - Tswana: 80.0%
  - Sotho: 20.0%
- Time zone: UTC+2 (SAST)

Nasrec is a suburb of Johannesburg, South Africa. It is located in Region F of the City of Johannesburg Metropolitan Municipality.

The name "Nasrec" is an abbreviation for "National Agricultural, Sports and Recreation Events Centre", a 270h multi use exhibition site in the former mining region of Crown Mines and home of the Rand Show, an agricultural, industrial and commercial exhibition held annually. Nasrec is the last station on its branch line of the Johannesburg Metro railway line and is home to the Johannesburg Soccer City (FNB Stadium) and Johannesburg Expo Centre.

== South African lexicon ==
Within the South African lexicon the name of the suburb has become synonymous with the Expo Centre. The 54th National Conference of the African National Congress is also referred to by the name of the suburb as the conference was held at the Expo Centre.

== See also ==
- Rand Show
- FNB Stadium
- 54th National Conference of the African National Congress
- 2025 G20 Johannesburg summit
