= Change Starts Now =

South African political movement

Change Starts Now is a South African political movement founded in December 2023, advocating for social and economic change in alignment with the principles outlined in "The South Africa We Want And Deserve" manifesto. The party is led by Roger Jardine, a prominent Anti-Apartheid activist with a track record in private sector and government leadership. It was launched in Riverlea, Johannesburg West, where Roger was born.

The party launched its election manifesto, the 'Change Charter: A Manifesto of Hope', in Kliptown, Soweto on 19 February 2024.

== Background and foundation ==
The movement emerged as a response to ongoing debates about the state of South Africa and a perceived gap between the promises outlined in the country's constitution and the current reality. The founders are former UDF leader and speechwriter Murphy Morobe, editor and activist Mark Heywood, Nicole Fritz of the Helen Suzman Foundation, and anti-apartheid activist and Nelson Mandela's former doctor, Dr Aslam Dasoo. They claim to be inspired by the vision articulated in the party's manifesto that sought to address issues related to equality, dignity, security, freedom, education, employment, protection, housing, water, energy, justice, healthcare, and food security.

== Leadership ==
Roger Jardine is the leader of the political movement. His experience in the business sector, and his involvement underscores the movement's commitment to a multi-faceted approach that incorporates both public and private sector perspectives.

== Public reception ==
Public reception to Change Starts Now has been diverse, with supporters praising its commitment to the principles outlined in "The South Africa We Want And Deserve". Critics, however, have raised questions about the feasibility and practicality of implementing the proposed changes.

Willie Esterhuyse, who played an important role in the negotiations leading up to the transition to a democracy in South Africa, remarked in an interview published in Die Burger newspaper on 15 February 2024 that "From political history we learn that countries are saved by organized middle groups. But then you have to have the right leaders." and "maybe" 'Roger Jardine with his Change Starts Now party is the man who could lead such a "revolt" of the non-racial middle class. But Esterhuyse emphasizes that ideally three or four strong leaders should emerge. "They will have to convert the anger of the middle class into strong support at the ballot box. And then they will have to put practical plans into action."

In response to the launch of the party's Change Charter election manifesto launched in Kliptown on 19 February 2024, the CEO of Sibanye-Stillwater, one of South Africa's top four private sector employers, Neal Froneman said “It is one of the most credible plans I have seen for realising South Africa's potential... I for one would be prepared to pay taxes that are needed to support the reconstruction and growth fund with real confidence that the money would be used meaningfully to secure a prosperous future. Implementation of the CSN Charter would build a national unified identity that we can all identify with”
