= Rand Show =

Annual consumer exhibition in Johannesburg, South Africa

- Status: Active
- Genre: Consumer Lifestyle Exhibition & Experience
- Frequency: Annually
- Venue: Expo Centre
- Locations: Nasrec, Johannesburg
- Coordinates: 26.244582°S 27.981810°E
- Country: South Africa
- Years active: 130–131
- Inaugurated: 13 March 1895
- Previous event: 28 March – 1 April 2024
- Next event: 17 April to 21 April 2025
- Organiser: Dogan Exhibitions & Events (Pty) Ltd
- Website: www.randshow.co.za

The Rand Show, previously known as the Rand Easter Show, is an annual show held in Johannesburg, South Africa, and is the largest consumer exhibition in Southern Africa. It has been an important event in the city for many years, attracting in excess of 400,000 visitors in 2007. It was also called the Grand Rand Show, when it was held a few weeks outside of Easter in the late 1980s.

There were no shows in 2020–21 due to COVID-19 restrictions on major events. The event has been held again since 2024. The next event is scheduled for 17 April to 21 April 2025. Besides the Boer War, other cancellations occurred in 1915–18 & 1940–45.

== History ==
The show was first held at the Old Wanderers cricket ground in November 1894 by the Witwatersrand Agricultural Society, a society that had formed in March of the same year. The second show was opened by Paul Kruger on 13 March 1895, at a venue called Milner Park, which is today the site of the University of the Witwatersrand's West Campus. It was held again in 1896 and reestablished subsequent to the end of the Anglo Boer War, in 1907. In 1936, the Rand Show was called the Empire Exhibition.

The eleven-day show was historically an agricultural exhibition for all South Africans where livestock, poultry, yearlings, farm products and equipment were shown and judged with prizes awarded in the form of gold and silver medals. In later years it also featured industrial and commercial exhibitions and would eventually attract foreign participants who would exhibit country pavilions. Other annual exhibitors included Military Tattoos, the South African Defence Force, the South African Police as well as show-jumping competitions. The 1960 show was the site of a failed assassination attempt on Prime Minister Hendrik Verwoerd, by white farmer David Pratt.

In 1981, the Witwatersrand Agricultural Society decided that it need a larger venue. A 51ha site was chosen on Crown Mines property that would be part of a larger 270ha planned National Sport, Recreation, and Exhibition (NASREC) site. The venue was built to accommodate at least 150,000 people a day. Other items planned for the site included new road connections, railway station and parking.

The project comprised two phases, the first included 43,322 m^{2} of exhibition areas, restaurant, toilets, and other facilities while phase two doubled the exhibition space and facilities. Architect firm Stucke, Harrison & Partners start the design phase in early 1982. Con Roux cleared the area from late 1982, Pipeline Construction repositioned the Rand Water main and LTA Showgrounds Limited won the tender to construct the site. The completion date was September 1984, but the projects actual completion date was January 1985. Landscaping followed before the planned April 1985 opening.

The architectural design included a public area consisting of an esplanade with fountains, band area and monorail, surrounded by exhibition halls. The halls were interlinked with restaurants, conference centres and toilets. The agricultural and equestrian areas had stalls for 2,500 cattle, 550 horses, and stalls for other animals, with a main arena, judging pens, clubhouse, restaurants, and a presidential suite.

=== Venue after 1984 ===
It continued to be held at Milner Park until 1984, when it was moved to the Expo Centre at Nasrec, and the brand was sold in 2000 to company Kagiso Exhibitions & Events, a subsidiary of Kagiso Media.

In 2009, the Rand Show was to have moved to Gallagher Estate, with a separate Joburg Easter Festival being held at the Nasrec Expo Centre, however, the Expo Centre bought the Rand Show brand back from Kagiso, and the Rand Show was held, as normal, at Nasrec, as the Joburg Easter Festival, incorporating the Rand Show.

In 2009, the show, branded as the Rand Show and subtitled Joburg's Easter Festival, was again held at Nasrec, and the 2011 Rand Show scheduled to take place from 22 April to 2 May 2011.

The 2012 event ran from 6 April 2012 to 15 April 2012. The 2013 event of the Rand Show ran from 28 March 2013 to 1 April 2013. The 2014 event was hosted again at NASREC from 18 April 2014 to 28 April 2014. The 2015 Rand Show ran from 3 April 2015 to 12 April 2015, and featured "pirates paradise" and the SANDF.

== Merchandise ==
According to its website, the Rand Show offers products in one of its six categories: "Sports Expo, Kids Expo, Lifestyle Expo, Science & Tech Expo, Showcase SA and Outdoor Lifestyle Expo".
