= Hoërskool Alberton =

High school in South Africa

Coordinates: 26°15′58″S 28°07′51″E

Hoërskool Alberton is an Afrikaans high school in Florentia, Alberton, South Africa. On Tuesday, Oct. 12, 1948, the books, furniture, and other supplies in use in the middle section of the Kruger School were transferred to the new junior high school in Alberton. The first principal, P.F. Erasmus, opened the school with nine teachers and 183 pupils.

The school was officially opened on Feb. 24, 1949 by the Administrator of the Transvaal, Dr. W Nicol. In 1954, the junior high school became a full-fledged high school with ten pupils in standard ten. Improvements were made to the existing buildings in 1954 and 1959.

From 1960 to 1975, Mr. J.J. le Roux was head of the school. From 1976 to August 1994 Dr. P. Krynauw was the principal. Since August 1994, Mr. H.J. Schoeman has served as principal.

== Notable alumni ==
• Michiel Le Roux - Banker, Business Executive. Founder of Capitec Bank
