= Percy Qoboza =

Percy Peter Tshidiso Qoboza
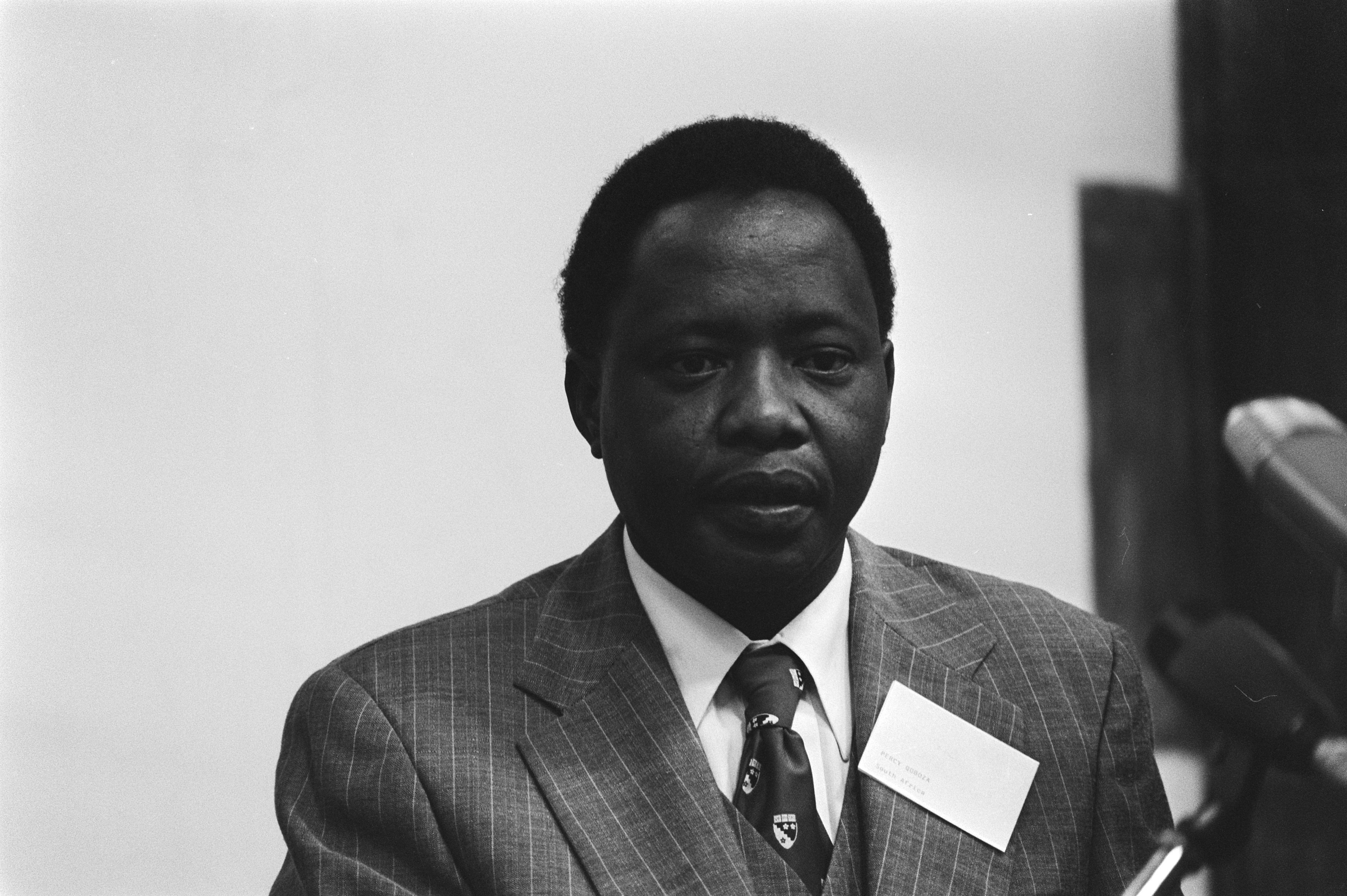
- Percy Qoboza in 1978
- Born: 17 January 1938; Sophiatown, South Africa
- Died: 17 January 1988 (aged 50); Johannesburg, South Africa
- Occupations: Journalist, Newspaper Editor, Columnist
- Writing career
- Pen name: Percy Qoboza

Percy Peter Tshidiso Qoboza (17 January 1938 – 17 January 1988) was a black South African journalist, author, and outspoken critic of the apartheid government in South Africa during the early periods of world recognition of the problems evident in the racially divided land.

== Early life ==
Born in Sophiatown to a Xhosa family, he experienced the harsh realities of oppression and discrimination in his homeland when the entire township was destroyed in 1952 in an apartheid cleansing of the area. Many of the residents were packed up and carted off in open trucks.

He later used this and many other experiences to excel at Lesotho University where he earned a degree in theology, but later returned home to complete studies in journalism.

== Career as an editor ==
As editor of The World newspaper in Soweto from 1974 until the late 1970s, he gave the world a view of the Soweto riots which broke out on 16 June 1976.

Under his direction, The World's circulation increased to become the most read newspaper by blacks in the country. This allowed views to be shaped during the period when many young black radicals where formed and saw the need for change immediately.

This was seen as a threat to the minority government and many attacks and threats were made against Qoboza and his family. Finally on 19 October 1977, The World offices were closed and the paper was banned. Qoboza and scores of others were thrown into jail for 6 months without trial. His family had no way to communicate with him and had no way to know if he was alive. When he was released, he was eventually told to leave the country. He was invited to the United States and he traveled to Washington, D.C. and worked with the Washington Star in 1980.

He was returning to the United States after he was initially nominated as South Africa's Nieman Fellow at Harvard University in September 1975. The time he spent in Cambridge would continue to shape his voice and allow him to build strong bridges with journalists from all over the world.

He returned to South Africa and became the editor of City Press in 1984. Again his sharp style gave a strong, passionate voice to the ongoing struggle to end oppression. He failed to see the end of his life's work having died in 1988 on his 50th birthday, after suffering a heart attack on Christmas Day in 1987 and slipping into a coma. His funeral was attended by over 5000 mourners including many of the leaders of the struggle in South Africa (including Winnie Mandela and Nthato Motlana, the United States Ambassador Edward Perkins, and press from around the world.

In 2000, Qoboza was named as one of the International Press Institute's 50 World Press Freedom Heroes of the past 50 years.

== Percy Qoboza Award ==
The National Association of Black Journalists in the United States awards an annual honor to the journalist who best exemplifies the spirit of Qoboza. According to their website, the prize is "[a]warded to a foreign journalist who has done extraordinary work while overcoming tremendous obstacles that contributes to the enrichment, understanding or advancement of people or issues in the African diaspora. The honor is not open to journalists working for American-based publications."

=== Winners ===
- 2024 – Roberson Alphonse, Le Nouvelliste, Haiti
- 2023 – Marcus Ryder, Sir Lenny Henry Centre for Media Diversity
- 2022 – Nima Elbagir, CNN
- 2021 – Anas Aremeyaw Anas, Insight TWI
- 2020 – Mahmoud Hussein, Al Jazeera
- 2019 – Pap Saine, The Point
- 2018 – Chika Oduah, Voice of America
- 2017 – Wesley Gibbings
- 2011 – Jean-Claude Kavumbagu, Net Press
- 2008 – Imprisoned Journalists of Eritrea
- 2007 – National Union of Somali Journalists
- 2006 – Deyda Hydara, & Members of the Gambian Press Union (Posthumous)
- 2005 – Michele Montas, Haiti
- 2004 – Pius Njawe, Cameroon
- 2003 – Geoffrey Nyarota, The Daily News, Zimbabwe
- 2002 – Milkias Mihreteab Yohannes, Eritrea
- 2000 – Rafael Marques, Angola
- 1999 – Fred Mmembe, The Post, Zambia
- 1997 – Marie-Roger Biloa, Africa International magazine, Paris
- 1996 – Babacar Fall, Pan-African News Agency, Senegal
- 1995 – Kenneth Best, The Daily Observer, Liberia
- 1994 – Zubeida Jaffer, Cape Town, South Africa
- 1989 – Zwelake Sisulu, New Nation, South Africa
