= Jacob Mfaniselwa Nhlapo =

South African propagandist and journalist

Jacob Mfaniselwa Nhlapo (15 January 1903 – 25 March 1957) was a South African educator, journalist, political propagandist, and the first Black South African with two Doctorates. Nhlapo is known for his 1944 pamphlet, "Bantu Babel: Will The Bantu Language Live?", in which he argued that all the major African languages in South Africa should be systematically combined into a single language.

== Early life and education ==
Jacob Nhlapo was born in 1903 at Petsana, Reitz, a town in the northeast of the Free State province, South Africa. He studied privately through the University of South Africa (Unisa), earning a Junior Certificate (Grade 10) in 1928 and a Senior Certificate (Grade 12) the following year. In 1940 Nhlapo obtained a Unisa Bantu Studies diploma and became principal of the Wilberforce Institute in Evaton near Vereeniging where he lived at the time where the American Methodist Episcopal Church (AME) established the Wilberforce Institute. During this time Nhlapo took a journalism course through the Regent Institute in London.He obtained a Psychology doctorate from University of Chicago's McKinley-Roosevelt Extension College in 1944 and became propagandist for the National Executive of the African National Congress, then led by Dr. Alfred Bitini Xuma. After resigning from Wilberforce in 1953, Nhlapo became the editor of Bantu World replacing Selope Thema
