= Marie-Roger Biloa =

Cameroonian, television host, journalist and filmmaker

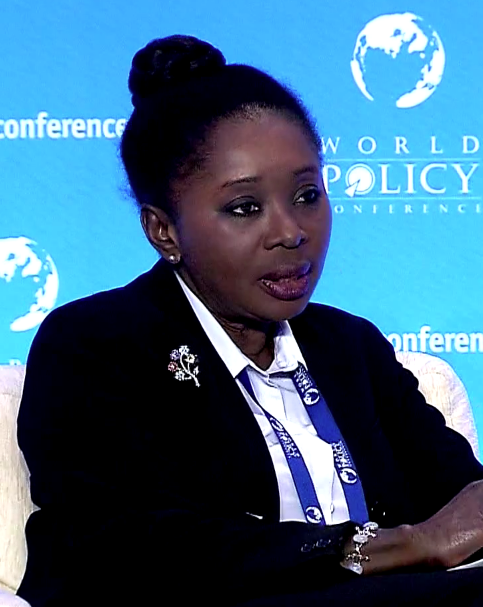
- Born: Bilow
- Citizenship: Cameroon
- Occupations: Journalist; magazine editor; television show host; filmmaker; president of various community-oriented initiatives.
- Notable work: Chevalier of the Order of Arts and Letters; Africa-international.info
- Awards: Percy Qoboza Award.; 1997, the Journalist of the Year by the American organization, the National Association of Black Journalists, receiving the award from then United States President Bill Clinton himsel

Marie-Roger Biloa is a Cameroonian magazine editor, television show host, journalist, filmmaker and president of various community-oriented initiatives. She lives in France, from where she hosts a television talk show. In France, she was named a Chevalier of the Order of Arts and Letters. For her work as a journalist, she has also received the Percy Qoboza Award. Biloa owns a website named Africa-international.info.

== Early life ==
Biloa is the daughter of Germain Tsala Mekongo, who in 1957 became Cameroon's first Secretary of State for Civil Service. She went to the Paris-IV University, where she graduated in Germanic studies.

== Career ==
In 1991, Biloa became the editor of the Africa International, a magazine which was established in 1958 and which focused on politics, economic news and culture when Biloa joined it.

Later on, Marie-Roger Biloa joined the controversial pan-African themed magazine Jeune Afrique, which had previously been banned in several Northern African (Arab) countries.

In 1997, Biloa was honored as the Journalist of the Year by the American organization, the National Association of Black Journalists, receiving the award from then United States President Bill Clinton himself.

In 2001, Biloa was named woman of excellence by Unesco.

== Launching a television channel ==
Ms. Biloa announced on October 15, 2018, that she would be launching a new television channel named MRB TV (not to be confused with MRB Productions, an American film producing company), which is a cable and satellite television channel.

== Personal info ==
She is fluent in various languages, including Spanish, English, French and German. Biloa lives between Paris, Berlin and Yaounde, Cameroon.
