= Trust Women Conference =

- Headquarters: London, United Kingdom
- Services: conference; Women's rights
- Website: Trust Women Conference

Trust Conference is an annual conference organized by the Thomson Reuters Foundation. Subjects include clashes between culture and the law, the global fight against human trafficking and modern-day slavery. The conference was until 2017 called Trust Women.

== History ==
Trust Women began in 2012. As a direct result of the 2012 Trust Women Conference, the Thomson Reuters Foundation - along with the Manhattan District Attorney Cyrus R. Vance Jr - launched a financial working group to fight human trafficking. Members of the group include some of the world's biggest financial institutions (Bank of America, Citigroup, JPMorgan Chase, Wells Fargo, Barclays, TD Bank, American Express, Western Union) along with U.S. Immigration and Customs Enforcement, the Human Trafficking Pro Bono Legal Center, and NGOs working with trafficking victims. In 2014, the financial working group released a white paper aimed at helping the wider industry to identify and report irregularities in financial transactions that might be linked to human trafficking activity.

Previous speakers at the conference have included Theresa May, and Phumzile Mlambo-Ngcuka.

== Trust Women Advisory Board ==
- Mabel van Oranje
- Cherie Blair
- Her Majesty Queen Noor
- Cathy Russell
- Stephen Dunbar-Johnson
- John Studzinski
- Livia Firth
- Dr. Sima Samar
- Claudia Prado
