= Glow TV =

Television channel in South Africa

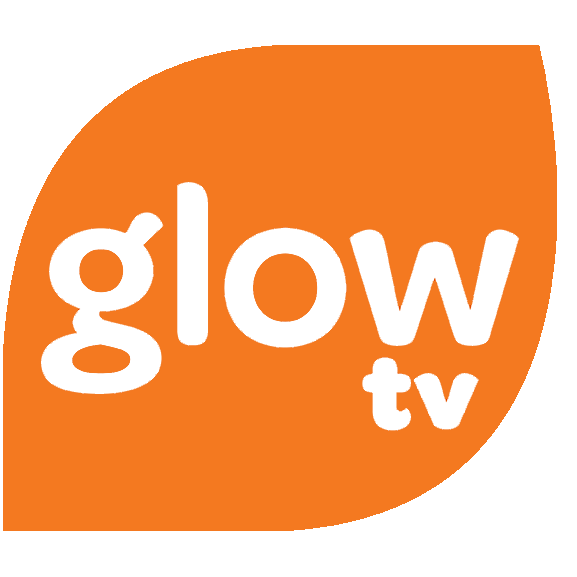
- Glow TV logo
- Country: South Africa
- Broadcast area: South Africa

Availability

Terrestrial
- Openview Channel 140

Glow TV was a television channel in South Africa that aired Indian series and local South African content. It launched in October 2013 and closed in February 2023.
