= Soweto Civic Association =

The Soweto Civic Association was an organisation formed in Soweto, South Africa, in 1979, formed out of what was known as the "Committee of Ten", by black professionals who wished to administer the city's affairs by themselves and not by an Apartheid representative local administration board officials and councillors.

== Background ==
After the Soweto uprising in 1976, the existing Soweto Urban Bantu Council collapsed. After a suggestion was made in the World newspaper that prominent Sowetan people form a local government to run Soweto, a meeting was held in June 1977. Three hundred people met and a Committee of Ten was formed under the chairmanship of Dr Nthato Motlana with the rest made up of professionals, teachers and churchmen.

Its initial name was the Soweto Local Interim Committee. Its aim was not to collaborate with the local government administrative boards but to negotiate directly with the national government with the objective of running the city with an elected council and a budget financed by local taxes and a state subsidy.

The South African government would not negotiate and instead continued its policy of Community Councils made up of black councillors that would collaborate with the government and legitimise the Apartheid policies. When the Committee of Ten organised protests against these councils being formed, the committee was arrested and detained. Elections for the Soweto Community Council were then announced for February 1978 but the detention of the Committee lead to a boycott of the elections by the people of Soweto. The Committee members were eventually released.

In 1979, the Soweto Civic Association was formed and its executive made of the Committee of Ten. By late 1979, the Soweto Civic Association was advocating for a Greater Johannesburg Metropolitan Board which would include existing Black, Indian and Coloured townships as the revenue required to run a city like Soweto was not sufficient. But by 1980, it was advocating non-negotiation until non-whites were involved in free elections in the South Africa. In the 1980, the Soweto Civic Association was involved in advocating rent boycotts, supporting general strikes and support against bus ticketing increases, as well as calling for the release of Nelson Mandela.
