= Nthato Motlana =

South African businessman, activist and physician (1925-2008)

- Born: 16 February 1925; South Africa
- Died: 30 November 2008 (aged 83); Johannesburg, South Africa
- Education: University of the Witwatersrand, Johannesburg, University of Fort Hare

Dr. Nthato Harrison Motlana OMSG (16 February 1925 – 1 December 2008) was a prominent South African businessman, physician and anti-apartheid activist.

== Early life ==
He was born in Marapyane close to Pretoria. He attended and matriculated at Kilnerton High School, Pretoria. He then attended the University of Fort Hare and obtained a B.Sc. degree. Furthering his education, he took medicine at the University of the Witwatersrand. Banned by the government for five years, he had to make a request to the apartheid government for permission to attend his graduation in 1954. In 1956 he became a resident doctor at Baragwanath Hospital.

== Life under Apartheid ==
He became politically active at Fort Hare when he joined the African National Congress Youth League and later became its secretary. He was tried alongside Nelson Mandela by the Apartheid regime during the Defiance Campaign of 1951–52. He played a prominent role during the Soweto uprising as a member of the Black Community Programme and the Black Parents' Association which resulted in he and his wife being detained and after the collapse of the Soweto Urban Bantu Council, became one of the members of the Soweto Committee of Ten in June 1977. As founding member of the Black Community Programme, its goal was to economically empower black South Africans, and he founded Phaphama Africa Commercial Enterprises, Lesedi Clinic (the first black owned, private up-market hospital in the country), and Sizwe Medical Aid (the first black owned medical aid scheme in South Africa).

Motlana: The Sharpeville Massacre chillingly portrayed the readiness of the state to use violence to counter and crush opposition, a willingness that has been seen time and time again since then.

— From Discussions of the Inaugural Programme of the Africa Leadership Forum, Ota, Nigeria, 24 October to 1 November 1988

== Life after apartheid ==
Following apartheid, Motlana took a lead role in the formation of the New African Investments Limited, or NAIL, which purchased many previously white run corporations at below market value. These included South Africa's largest newspaper The Sowetan. Due to his huge success in business Motalana earned the nickname "Father of Black Economic Empowerment."

Motlana served on the boards of Putco, Rand Water Board, Adcock Ingram Group and Sasol, amongst other civic and academic institutions.

== Marriage ==
Motlana married his wife Sally Maunye in Soweto in 1953.

== Death ==
He died on 1 December 2008 in a private hospital in Johannesburg.
