= Selope Thema =

South African Political Activist

Richard Victor Selope Thema
- Born: 1886; Ga-Mamabolo, Pietersburg, South African Republic
- Died: 1955 (aged 68–69); Orlando West, Johannesburg, Union of South Africa
- Office: politician, journalist and newspaper editor

Richard Victor Selope Thema (1886–1955) was a South African political activist and leader. He was a member of the South African Native National Congress deputation sent to Britain and Versailles in 1919 to intercede on behalf of black South Africans, many of whom had fought for Britain in the First World War

== Early years ==
Richard Victor Selope Thema was born in Ga-Mamabolo, Pietersburg district, in 1886. Both his parents were Pedi speaking but not originally belonging to the Mamabolo tribe who, through early contact with missionaries, were already Christians.

Thema attended mission schools, he interrupted his education when he ran away from school in 1901 and joined the British troops stationed in Pietersburg during the South African War (1899 - 1902). After peace was declared he went to Pretoria where he first worked as a waiter in a boarding-house and then at the Imperial Military Railway Dispensary in Pretoria. In 1903 Thema resumed his education. From 1906 to 1910 he studied at Lovedale Institution in Alice, Eastern Cape. Thema completed the Junior Certificate in 1907 and then qualified as a teacher.

=== Political career ===
Beginning at the end of 1910, Thema taught in the Pietersburg district for a year, but then started working as a clerk, first at the Pietersburg mine recruiting office for three years, and from 1915 in Johannesburg in the office of the attorney Richard W. Msimang. Msimang was chairperson of the committee that had to draw up a new constitution for the South African Native National Congress (SANNC) . Thema acted as Msimang's secretary on the committee. This led to Thema's increasing involvement in the affairs of the congress and in 1915 he was elected provincial secretary of the Transvaal branch of the SANNC. Thema was also known for his writing abilities.

=== Legacy ===
Kwa-Thema township outside Springs was named after him, as well as the Selope Thema Community School in Orlando East, in Soweto. Selope Thema street in the West Rand township of Mohlakeng was also named after him

He was awarded posthumously the Order of Ikhamanga in Gold in 2008.

=== Literature ===
Alan Cobley (ed.): From Cattle-Herding to Editor's Chair: The Unfinished Autobiography and Writings of Richard Victor Selope Thema. Van Riebeek Society for the Publication of South African Historical Documents, Cape Town 2016, ISBN 978-0-9814264-6-4.
