= New Africa Investments Limited =

South African company

New Africa Investments Limited (Nail) was a South African investment company known as a major player in early black economic empowerment.

== History ==
The company originated in 1993 in what is often identified as the first informal black economic empowerment (BEE) transaction, the sale by Sanlam of Metropolitan Life shares to a black-owned company initially called Metlife Investment Holdings (Methold). In August 1994, Methold listed on the Johannesburg Stock Exchange as New Africa Investments Limited (Nail). Nthato Motlana's Corporate Africa owned 51 per cent of the company, and Motlana became chairman. In 1999 Motlana was forced out and Nail's ownership structure was reformed.

== Notable directors ==
- Saki Macozoma
- Dikgang Moseneke
- Nthato Motlana
- Cyril Ramaphosa
- Zwelakhe Sisulu
