= Lesedi FM =

South African Radio Network

- * Bloemfontein; Johannesburg; South Africa
- Broadcast area: Free State
- Frequency: 87.7 - 106.6 FM

Programming
- Format: Contemporary

Ownership
- Owner: SABC

History
- First air date: 1960

Links
- Website: http://www.lesedifm.co.za

Lesedi FM is a South African PBS radio network owned the South African Broadcasting Corporation (SABC).

== Coverage areas and frequencies ==
The station was launched in 1960 and is currently available in seven provinces with a spill-over to the other two on 87.7 – 106.6 FM frequencies.

Lesedi FM broadcasts from Bloemfontein to the Sesotho-speaking and understanding communities. It is the biggest Sesotho radio station in South Africa.

It is the 4th largest radio station in South Africa with an audience of 3.46 million with the highest audience share of 62% in the Free State and 10% in Gauteng.

== Target audience ==
Lesedi FM is an urban/metro radio station with the highest SEM 5-8, with a primary target audience of 25-49 with 52%, secondary 15-24 with 20% and loyal 50+ at 28%. Female 54% vs. Male 46%

== Main shows and presenters ==
Thakgoha Breakfast Show - Nyakallo "Ba2Cada" Leine, Seipati "Twasa" Seoke & Lucky Qacha(Sports).

Itlhabolle - Mannehileng Letuka & Tholoana Moletsane.

Jwale Ke Nako - Thuso Motaung

Rea Thella Afternoon Drive - Thabo Mokone & Lebo Maoela.

== Listenership figures ==
Estimated Listenership
	7 Day	Ave. Mon-Fri
May 2013	3 783 000	2 339 000
Feb 2013	3 629 000	2 159 000
Dec 2012	3 581 000	2 141 000
Oct 2012	3 593 000	2 145 000
Aug 2012	3 597 000	2 128 000
Jun 2012	3 584 000	2 112 000
