= Murphy Morobe =

South African apartheid historical figure

- Born: 2 October 1956 (age 69); Soweto, South Africa
- Known for: Student Activist and Politics
- Children: 4

Murphy Morobe (born 2 October 1956) is a historical figure from South Africa's anti-apartheid movement.

He started school in Ermelo. Morobe completed Primary School in Soweto and then went to Orlando North Secondary School and Morris Isaacson High School. While he was in high school he became interested in politics and history. In 1972 Morobe became part of the South African Student’s Movement (SASM). Important things to him were unity and community development.

Many members of the SASM were detained in 1973 and it became quite weak.

In 1974 Morobe helped with the re-building of SASM, and then was made treasurer by them. Later he was one of the student leaders of the Soweto Uprising in June, 1976. Due to his alleged role in the uprising, he spent three years in prison on Robben Island. He served his time alongside other student leaders. He also was in the company of South African political prisoner and African National Congress leader Nelson Mandela. He was released in May 1982.

After being released from prison, he returned to politics, involving himself with several groups, including: Congress of South African Students (COSAS), General and Allied Worker’s Union and he helped to form the United Democratic Front (South Africa) (UDF) in 1983.

In 1994 Morobe had become the first Chairperson and CEO of the Financial and Fiscal Commission of South Africa. Morobe was on the Council on Higher Education (CHE). He also is the Chairman of the South African National Parks Board (SANP), and is a part of the International Fundraising Consortium, an organisation that provides money grants to the non-governmental sectors of South Africa. Morobe has also been appointed to the position of Director on the board of the Old Mutual South Africa.

He is the spokesman for former South African President Thabo Mbeki.
