= South Africa =

Country in Southern Africa

Republic of South Africa
(in other official languages)
| Afrikaans | Republiek van Suid-Afrika |
| Southern Ndebele | iRiphabliki yeSewula Afrika |
| Northern Sotho | Repabliki ya Afrika-Borwa |
| Swazi | iRiphabhlikhi yoMzantsi Afrika |
| Sotho | Rephaboliki ya Afrika Borwa |
| Tswana | Rephaboliki ya Aforika Borwa |
| Tsonga | Riphabliki ya Afrika Dzonga |
| Venda | Riphabuḽiki ya Afurika Tshipembe |
| Xhosa | IRiphablikhi yoMzantsi-Afrika |
| Zulu | iRiphabhuliki yaseNingizimu Afrika |
- Flag Coat of arms
- Motto: "ǃke e꞉ ǀxarra ǁke" (ǀXam) "Unity in diversity"
- Anthem: "National Anthem of South Africa"
- Capital: Pretoria (executive) (Note: Pretoria serves as the executive capital of South Africa, hosting the Union Buildings and the offices of the President and Cabinet.) Cape Town (legislative) (Note: Cape Town is the legislative capital, home to the Parliament of South Africa, including the National Assembly and the National Council of Provinces.) Bloemfontein (judicial) (Note: Bloemfontein serves as the judicial capital, hosting the Supreme Court of Appeal, the highest court for non-constitutional matters in South Africa.)
- Largest city: Johannesburg
- Official languages: 12 languages: Afrikaans; English; Ndebele; Sepedi; Sesotho; Setswana; South African Sign Language; Swazi; Tshivenda; Xhosa; Xitsonga; Zulu; Languages with special status: Khoe languages; Nama; Khoisan languages; German; Greek; Gujarati; Hindi; Portuguese; Telugu; Tamil; Urdu; Arabic; Hebrew; Sanskrit
- Ethnic groups (2022): 81.4% Black; 8.2% Coloured; 7.3% White; 2.7% Indian or Asian; 0.4% other
- Religion (2022): 85.3% Christianity; 7.8% Traditional faiths; 3.1% No religion; 1.6% Islam; 1.1% Hinduism; 1.1% other
- Demonym: South African
- Government: Unitary parliamentary republic with an executive presidency
  - President: Cyril Ramaphosa
  - Deputy President: Paul Mashatile
  - Speaker of the National Assembly: Thoko Didiza
  - Chairperson of the National Council of Provinces: Refilwe Mtsweni-Tsipane
  - Chief Justice: Mandisa Maya
- Legislature: Parliament
  - Upper house: National Council of Provinces
  - Lower house: National Assembly

Independence from the United Kingdom
  - Union: 31 May 1910
  - Statute of Westminster: 11 December 1931
  - Republic: 31 May 1961
  - Tricameral Parliament: 3 September 1984
  - Current constitution: 4 February 1997

Area
  - Total: 1,221,037 km^{2} (471,445 sq mi) (24th)
  - Water (%): 0.380

Population
  - 2024 estimate: ▲63,015,904 (23rd)
  - 2022 census: ▲62,027,503 (23rd)
  - Density: 50.8/km^{2} (131.6/sq mi) (169th)
- GDP (PPP): 2026 estimate
  - Total: ▲$1.075 trillion (33rd)
  - Per capita: ▲$16,841 (107th)
- GDP (nominal): 2026 estimate
  - Total: ▲$489.083 billion (39th)
  - Per capita: ▲$7,659 (107th)
- Gini (2023): ▼63.0 very high inequality
- HDI (2023): ▲0.741 high (106th)
- Currency: South African rand (ZAR)
- Time zone: UTC+2 (SAST)
- Date format: Short formats: dd/mm/yyyy; dd-mm-yyyy
- Calling code: +27
- ISO 3166 code: ZA
- Internet TLD: .za

South Africa, officially the Republic of South Africa (RSA), is the southernmost country in Africa. (Note: Cape Agulhas is the geographical southernmost point of the African continent, marking the southern extremity of the Republic of South Africa.) The country consists of nine provinces, and is bounded to the south by 2,798 kilometres (1,739 miles) of coastline that stretches along the South Atlantic and Indian Ocean; to the north by the neighbouring countries of Namibia, Botswana, and Zimbabwe; and to the east and northeast by Mozambique and Eswatini. South Africa also encloses Lesotho. Covering an area of 1,221,037 square kilometres (471,445 square miles), the country has a population of over 63 million people, making it the sixth-most populated country in Africa, and 24th-most in the world. Pretoria is the administrative capital, while Cape Town, as the seat of Parliament, is the legislative capital, and Bloemfontein is regarded as the judicial capital. The largest and most populous city is Johannesburg, followed by Cape Town and Durban.

Archaeological findings suggest that various hominid species existed in South Africa about 2.5 million years ago, and modern humans inhabited the region over 100,000 years ago. The first known people were the indigenous Khoisan, and Bantu-speaking peoples, who migrated in waves, from west and central Africa to the region 2,000 to 1,000 years ago. In the north, the Kingdom of Mapungubwe formed in the 13th century, and the Venda Kingdom in the 17th century. In 1652, the Dutch established the first European settlement at Table Bay, Dutch Cape Colony. Its invasion in 1795, and the Battle of Blaauwberg in 1806 led to British occupation. The Mfecane, a period of significant upheaval, led to the formation of various African kingdoms, including the Zulu Kingdom. The region was further colonised, and the Mineral Revolution saw a shift towards industrialisation and urbanisation. Following the Second Boer War, the Union of South Africa was created in 1910 after the amalgamation of the Cape, Natal, Transvaal, and Orange River colonies, becoming a republic after the 1961 referendum. The multi-racial Cape Qualified Franchise in the Cape was gradually eroded, and the vast majority of black South Africans were not enfranchised until 1994.

The National Party imposed apartheid in 1948, institutionalising previous racial segregation. After a struggle by the African National Congress and other anti-apartheid activists, both inside and outside the country, the repeal of discriminatory laws began in the mid-1980s. Universal elections took place in 1994, following which all racial groups have held political representation in the country's liberal democracy, which comprises a parliamentary republic and nine provinces. Recognised as a middle power in international affairs, South Africa maintains significant regional influence and is a member of BRICS+, the African Union (hosting the seat of the Pan-African Parliament), SADC, SACU, the Commonwealth of Nations, and the G20.

A developing and newly industrialised country, it has the largest economy in Africa by nominal GDP, is tied with Ethiopia for the most UNESCO World Heritage Sites in Africa, and is a biodiversity hotspot with unique biomes, plant, and animal life. South Africa encompasses a variety of cultures, languages, and religions, and has been called the "rainbow nation", especially in the wake of apartheid, to describe its diversity. Since the end of apartheid, government accountability and quality of life have substantially improved for non-white citizens. However, crime, violence, poverty, and inequality remain widespread, with about 32% of the population unemployed as of 2024, while some 56% lived below the poverty line in 2014. Having the highest Gini coefficient of 0.67, South Africa is considered one of the most economically unequal countries in the world.

== Etymology ==
The name "South Africa" is derived from the country's geographic location at the southern tip of Africa. Upon formation, the country was named the Union of South Africa in English and Unie van Zuid-Afrika in Dutch, reflecting its origin from the unification of four British colonies. Since 1961, the long formal name in English has been the "Republic of South Africa" and Republiek van Suid-Afrika in Afrikaans. The country has an official name in 12 official languages.

Mzansi, derived from the Xhosa noun uMzantsi meaning "south", is a colloquial name for South Africa, while some Pan-Africanist political parties prefer the term "Azania", which is an archaic word for the coast of southeastern Africa.

== History ==
=== Prehistory ===
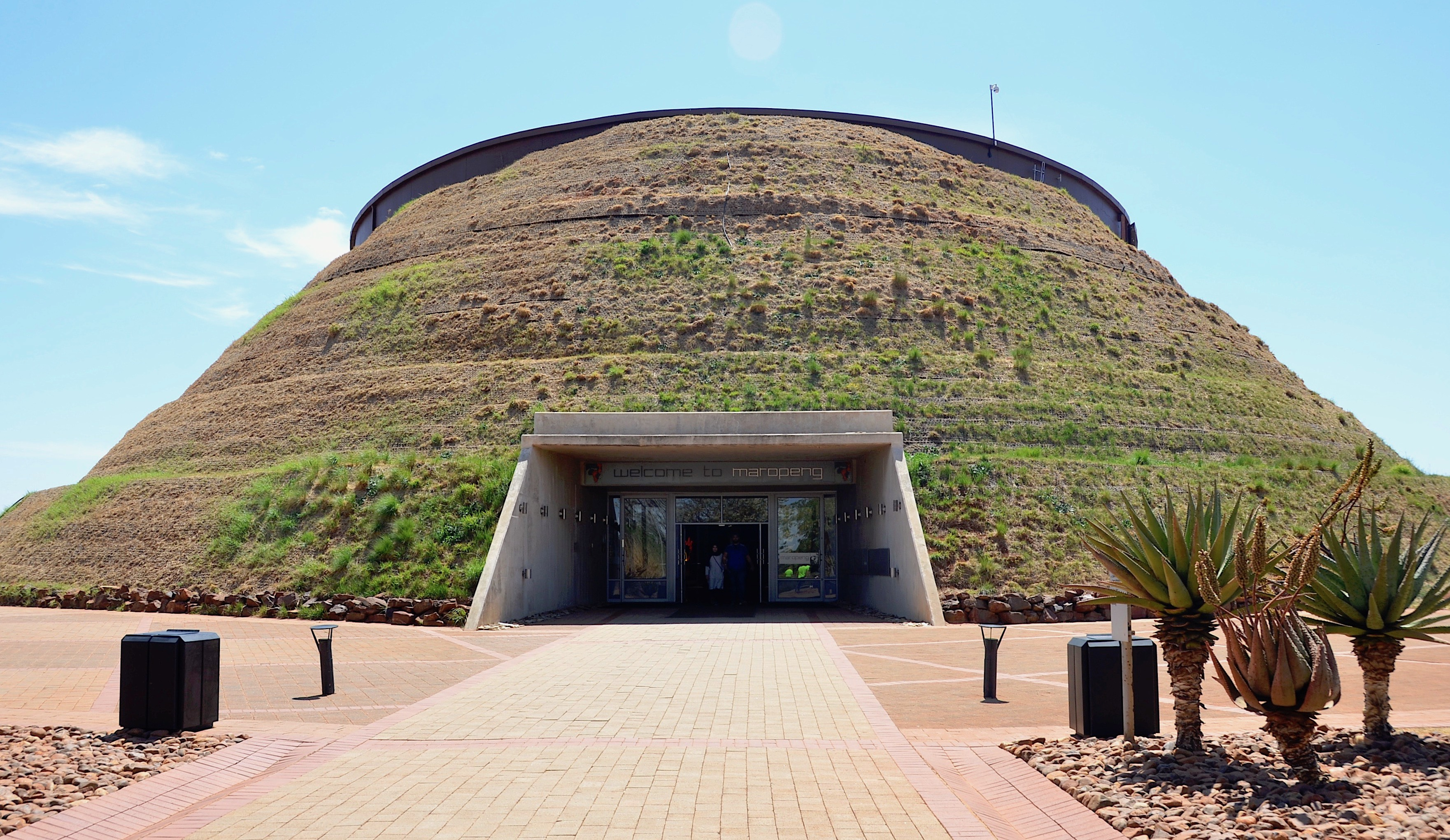
Front of Maropeng at the Cradle of Humankind

South Africa contains some of the oldest archaeological and human-fossil sites in the world. Archaeologists have recovered extensive fossil remains from a series of caves in Gauteng known as the Cradle of Humankind, which has been declared a UNESCO World Heritage Site. The sites include Sterkfontein, one of the richest sites for hominin fossils in the world, as well as Swartkrans, Gondolin Cave, Kromdraai, Cooper's Cave and Malapa. The first hominin fossil discovered in Africa, the Taung Child, was found near Taung in 1924. Other hominin remains have come from the sites of Makapansgat in Limpopo; Cornelia and Florisbad in the Free State; Border Cave in KwaZulu-Natal; Klasies River Caves in the Eastern Cape; and Pinnacle Point, Elandsfontein and Die Kelders Cave in the Western Cape.

These finds suggest that various hominid species existed in South Africa from about three million years ago, starting with Australopithecus africanus, followed by Australopithecus sediba, Homo ergaster, Homo erectus, Homo rhodesiensis, Homo helmei, Homo naledi and modern humans (Homo sapiens). Modern humans have inhabited Southern Africa for at least 170,000 years. Various researchers have located pebble tools within the Vaal River valley.

=== Pre-colonial period ===
The indigenous San and Khoikhoi peoples of Southern Africa were predominantly hunter-gatherers and, in the case of the Khoikhoi, also practised pastoralism. Khoisan peoples may be the descendants of an early dispersal of anatomically modern humans to Southern Africa before 150,000 years ago. They were largely displaced or absorbed by the Bantu expansion which took place between 1,500 and 2,000 years ago.

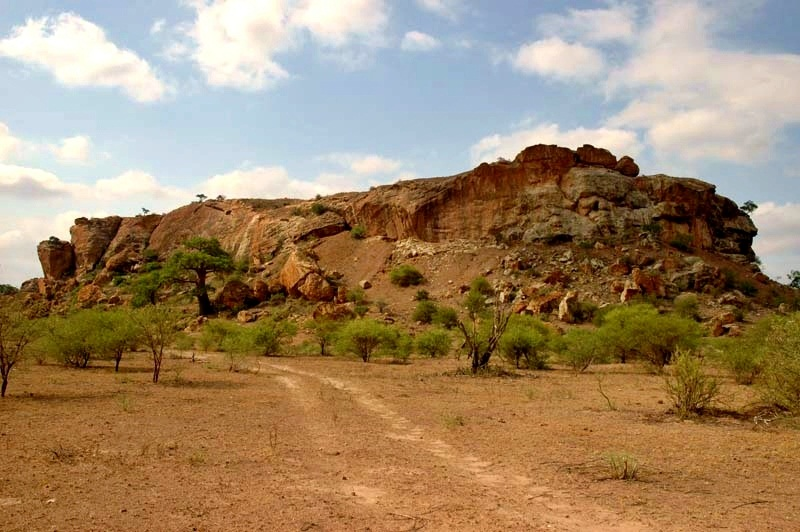
Mapungubwe Hill, the site of the former capital of the Kingdom of Mapungubwe

Bantu settlers expanded from West Africa from approximately 3,000 BCE. Settlements of Bantu-speaking peoples, who were iron-using agriculturists and herdsmen, were present south of the Limpopo River (now the northern border with Botswana and Zimbabwe) by the 4th or 5th century. The earliest ironworks in modern-day KwaZulu-Natal are believed to date from around 1050. The southernmost group was the Xhosa people, whose language incorporates certain linguistic traits from the Khoisan languages, and who eventually reached the Great Fish River in the present-day Eastern Cape. As they migrated, these larger Iron Age populations displaced or assimilated earlier peoples. In Mpumalanga, several stone circles have been found along with a stone arrangement that has been named Adam's Calendar, and the ruins are thought to be created by the Bakone, a Northern Sotho group.

Around 1220, in the Limpopo-Shashe Basin, the elite of K2 moved to settle the flat-topped summit of Mapungubwe Hill, with the population settling below. Rainmaking was crucial to the development of sacral kingship, and several rainmaking sites have been found nearby including Ratho Kroonkop. By 1250, the capital of the Mapungubwe Kingdom had a population of 5,000 and the state covered 30,000 km^{2} (11,500 square miles), growing wealthy through the Indian Ocean trade. The events around Mapungubwe's collapse circa 1300 are unknown; however, trade routes shifted north from the Limpopo to the Zambezi, precipitating the rise of Great Zimbabwe. The hill was abandoned and Mapungubwe's population scattered.

In the Soutpansberg, interactions between early Shona inhabitants (possible from Mapungubwe), late-comer Shona and Sotho-speakers between the 15th and 17th centuries culminated in the formation of the Venda language and identity. In the late-17th century, a splinter group from the dynasty of the Rozvi Empire migrated south; they were the Singo. The Singo settled at Dzata, which became the capital of the Venda Kingdom, and came to subdue all of the Soutpansberg. In the late-18th century, following trade routes moving south, the state collapsed. The most powerful dynasties that remained were the Ramabulana Singo in the western Soutpansberg, and the Tshivhase Singo and Mphaphuli Singo in the eastern Soutpansberg.

=== Portuguese exploration ===
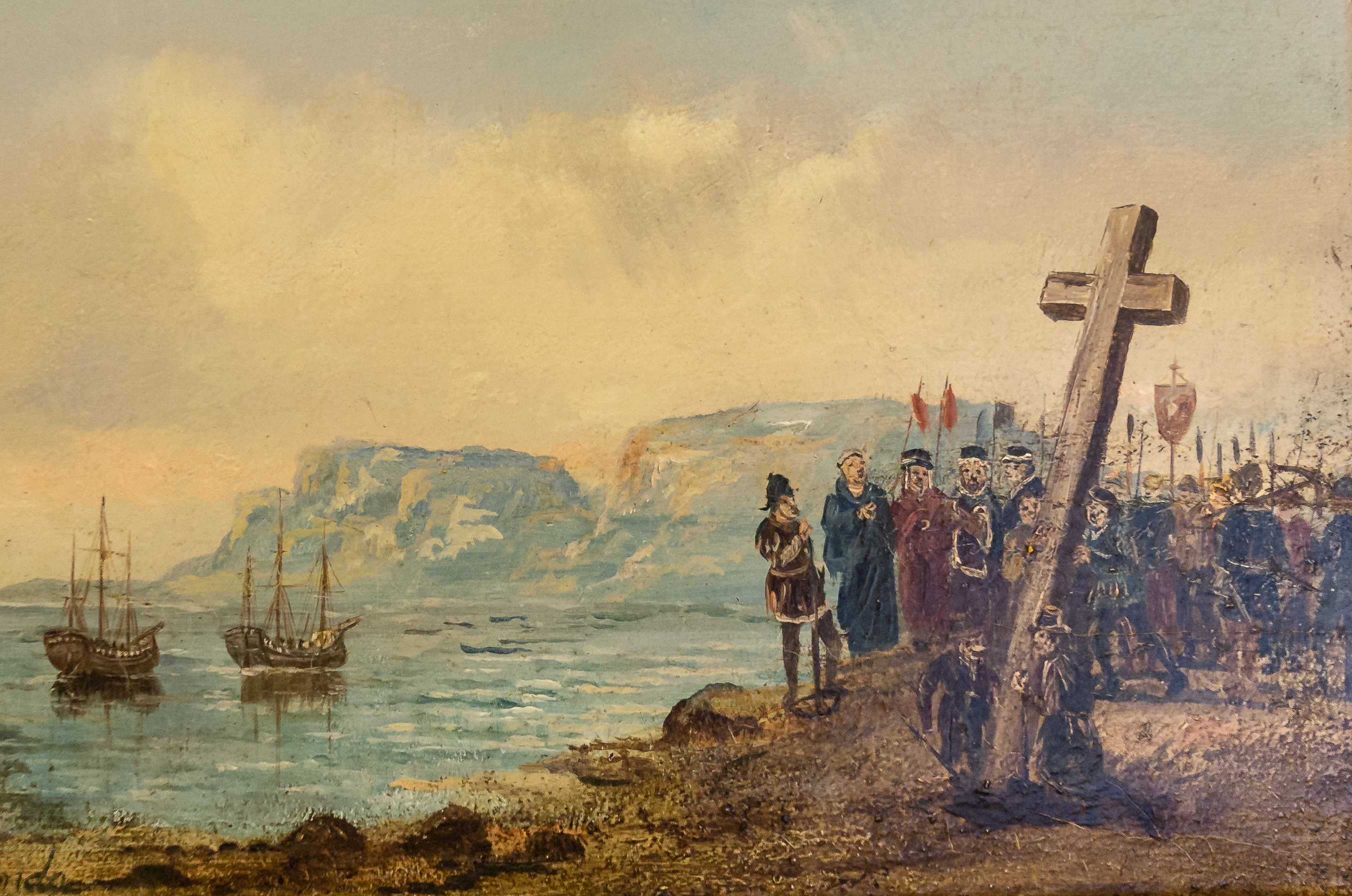
Portuguese explorer Bartolomeu Dias planting the cross at Cape Point after being the first to successfully round the Cape of Good Hope

In 1487, the Portuguese explorer Bartolomeu Dias led the first European voyage to land in southern Africa. On 4 December, he landed at Walfisch Bay (now known as Walvis Bay in present-day Namibia). This was south of the furthest point reached in 1485 by his predecessor, the Portuguese navigator Diogo Cão, being Cape Cross, north of the bay. Dias continued down the western coast of southern Africa. After 8 January 1488, prevented by storms from proceeding along the coast, he sailed out of sight of land and passed the southernmost point of Africa without seeing it. He reached as far up the eastern coast of Africa as, what he called, Rio do Infante, probably the present-day Groot River, in May 1488. On his return, he saw the cape, which he named Cabo das Tormentas ('Cape of Storms'). King John II renamed the point Cabo da Boa Esperança, or Cape of Good Hope, as it led to the riches of the East Indies. Dias' feat of navigation was immortalised in Luís de Camões' 1572 epic poem, Os Lusíadas.

In 1497 Vasco Da Gama set sail from Lisbon and became the first European to reach India in 1498 via the Cape of Good Hope, opening up oceanic trade between Europe and Asia. He bypassed the coast of present-day South Africa and made landfall in present-day Mozambique.

=== Dutch and British colonisation of the Cape ===
The Dutch first made contact with the coast of Southern Africa in 1595. With Portuguese maritime power declining in the early 17th century, English and Dutch merchants competed to dislodge Portugal's lucrative monopoly on the spice trade. British East India Company representatives sporadically called at the Cape in search of provisions from as early as 1601 but later came to favour Ascension Island and Saint Helena as ports of refuge. Dutch interest was aroused after 1647, when two employees of the Dutch East India Company were shipwrecked at the Cape for several months, and managed to survive by obtaining fresh water and meat from the indigenous peoples, and sowing crops in the fertile soil. Upon their return to Holland, they reported favourably on the Cape's potential as a "warehouse and garden" for provisions to stock passing ships for long voyages.

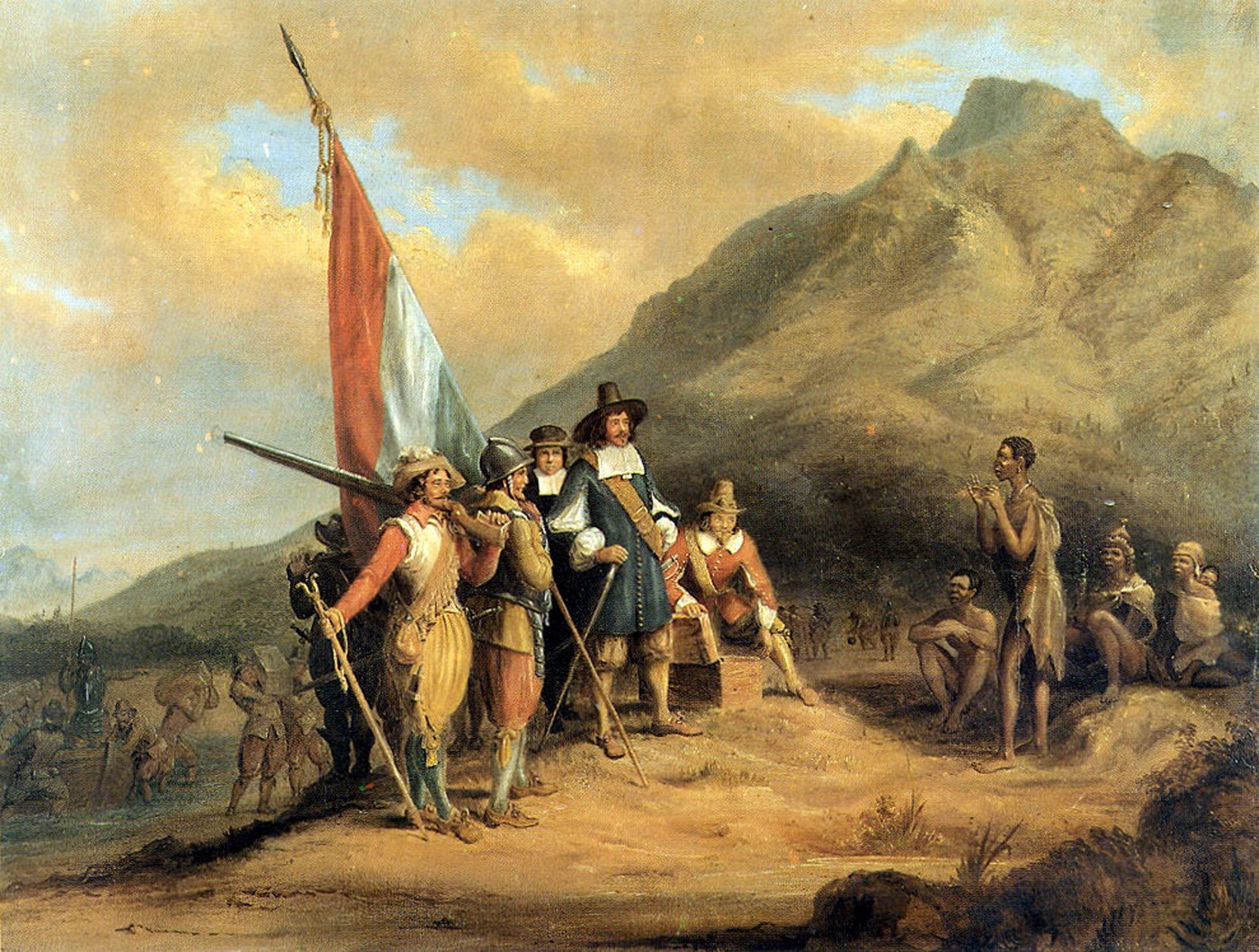
Charles Davidson Bell's 19th-century painting of Jan van Riebeeck, who founded the first European settlement in South Africa, arriving in Table Bay in 1652

In 1652, a century and a half after the discovery of the Cape Route, Jan van Riebeeck established a victualling station at the Cape of Good Hope, at what would become Cape Town, on behalf of the Dutch East India Company. In time, the Cape became home to a large population of Free Burghers. Dutch traders also brought thousands of enslaved people to the fledgling colony from present-day Indonesia, Madagascar, and eastern Africa. Some of the earliest mixed race communities in the country were formed between Free Burghers, enslaved people, and indigenous peoples. This led to the development of a new ethnic group, the Cape Coloureds, most of whom adopted the Dutch language and Christian faith. Conflicts over resources between the indigenous Khoisan people and Dutch settlers began in the 17th century and continued for centuries.

Dutch colonists' eastward expansion caused wars with the southwesterly migrating Xhosa nation, as both sides competed for the pastureland near the Great Fish River, which the colonists desired for grazing cattle. Free Burghers who became independent farmers on the frontier were known as Boers, with some (the trekboers) adopting semi-nomadic lifestyles. The Boers formed loose militias, which they termed commandos, and forged alliances with Khoisan peoples to repel Xhosa raids. Both sides launched bloody but inconclusive offensives, and sporadic violence, often accompanied by livestock theft, remained common for several decades.

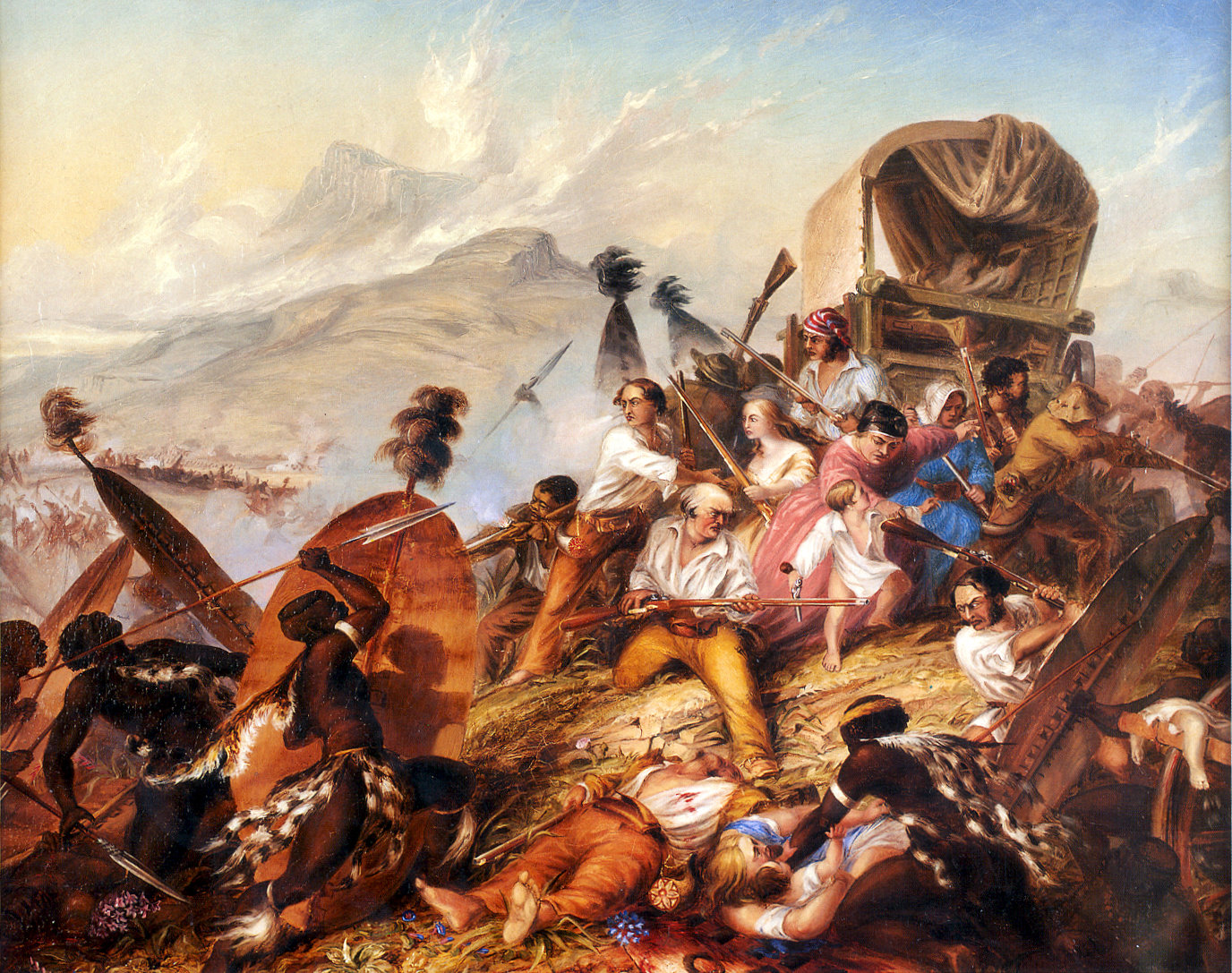
Depiction of a Zulu attack on a Boer camp in February 1838

Great Britain occupied Cape Town between 1795 and 1803 to prevent it from falling under the control of the French First Republic, which had invaded the Low Countries. After briefly returning to Dutch rule under the Batavian Republic in 1803, the Cape was occupied again by the British in 1806. Following the end of the Napoleonic Wars, it was formally ceded to Great Britain and became an integral part of the British Empire. British emigration to South Africa began around 1818, culminating in the arrival of the 1820 Settlers, the purpose of which was primarily to increase the size of the European workforce and bolster frontier regions against Xhosa incursions.

=== Mfecane and colonial expansion ===
In the early 1800s, the Mfecane (lit. 'crushing') saw a heightened period of conflict, migration, and state formation among native groups, caused by the complex interplay of international trade, environmental instability, and European colonisation. Chiefdoms grew wealthier and competed over trade routes and grazing land, leading to the formation of the Ndwandwe and Mthethwa Paramountcies in the east of the country. Ndwandwe defeated Mthethwa, which in turn split into several groups, one of which was led by Shaka of the amaZulu. The 1810s saw the fourth and fifth Xhosa Wars as British colonisation expanded. The Ndwandwe Paramountcy splintered amid costly raids, and Shaka's Zulu Kingdom rose to fill the power vacuum. The Gaza Empire concurrently formed, and while the Zulu managed to totally defeat the Ndwandwe, they were repelled by Gaza.

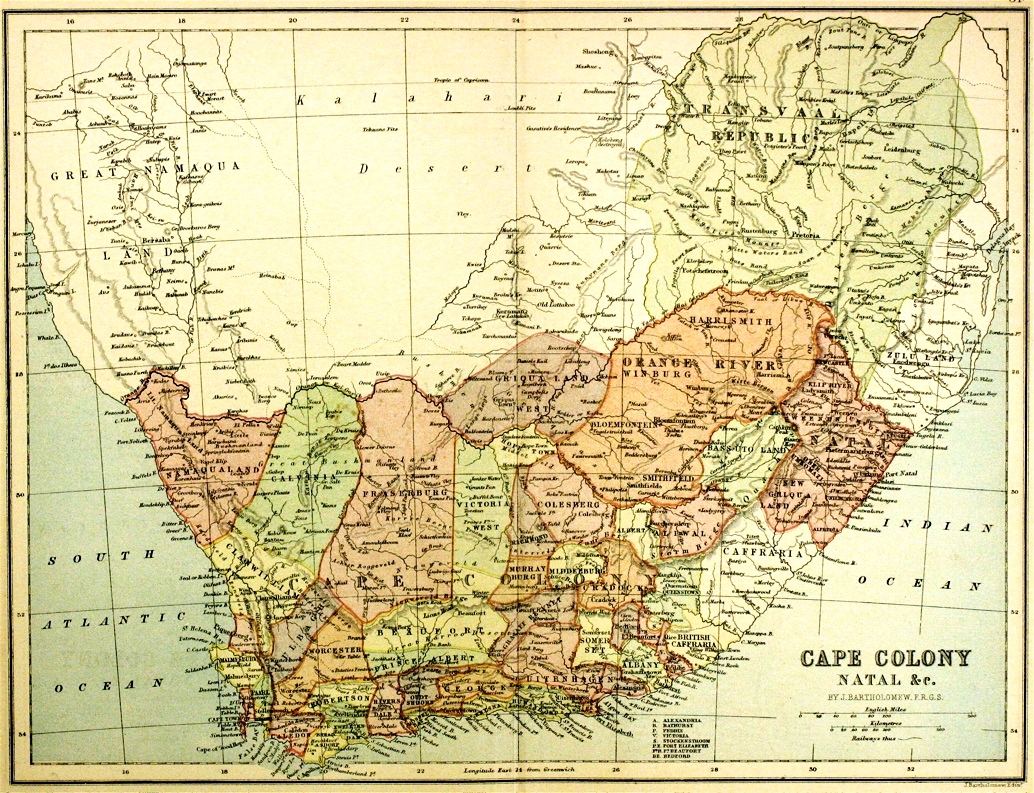
1876 map of South Africa

During the early 19th century, many Dutch settlers departed from the Cape Colony, where they had been subjected to British control, in a series of migrant groups who came to be known as Voortrekkers (lit. 'pathfinders' or 'pioneers'). They migrated to the future Natal, Free State, and Transvaal regions, and following their victory over the Zulu Kingdom at the Battle of Blood River on 16 December 1838, founded the Boer republics: the Natalia Republic, the South African Republic and the Orange Free State. In the interior, the Cape Colony expanded at the expense of the Batswana and Griqua, and Boer expansion destabilised the middle Orange River region. The Matabele kingdom came to dominate the eastern interior, and raided the Venda kingdom.

The discovery of diamonds in 1867 and gold in 1884 in the interior initiated the Mineral Revolution, which increased economic growth and immigration and intensified British subjugation of the indigenous peoples. The struggle to control these important economic resources shaped relations between Europeans and the indigenous population, as well as between the Boers and the British.

On 16 May 1876, President Thomas François Burgers of the South African Republic declared war against the Pedi people. King Sekhukhune defeated the army on 1 August 1876, with another attack by the Lydenburg Volunteer Corps being similarly repulsed. On 16 February 1877, the two parties signed a peace treaty at Botshabelo. The Boers' inability to subdue the Pedi led to the departure of Burgers in favour of Paul Kruger and the British annexation of the South African Republic. In 1878 and 1879, three British attacks were successfully repelled until Garnet Wolseley defeated Sekhukhune in November 1879 with an army of 2,000 British soldiers, Boers and 10,000 Swazis.

The Anglo-Zulu War was fought in 1879 between the British and the Zulu Kingdom. Following Lord Carnarvon's successful introduction of federation in Canada, it was thought that similar political effort, coupled with military campaigns, might succeed with the African kingdoms, tribal areas and Boer republics in South Africa. In 1874, Henry Bartle Frere was sent to South Africa as the British High Commissioner to bring such plans into being. Among the obstacles were the presence of the independent states of the Boers, and the Zulu army. The Zulu nation defeated the British at the Battle of Isandlwana but ultimately lost the war, resulting in the termination of its independence.

=== Boer Wars and independence ===
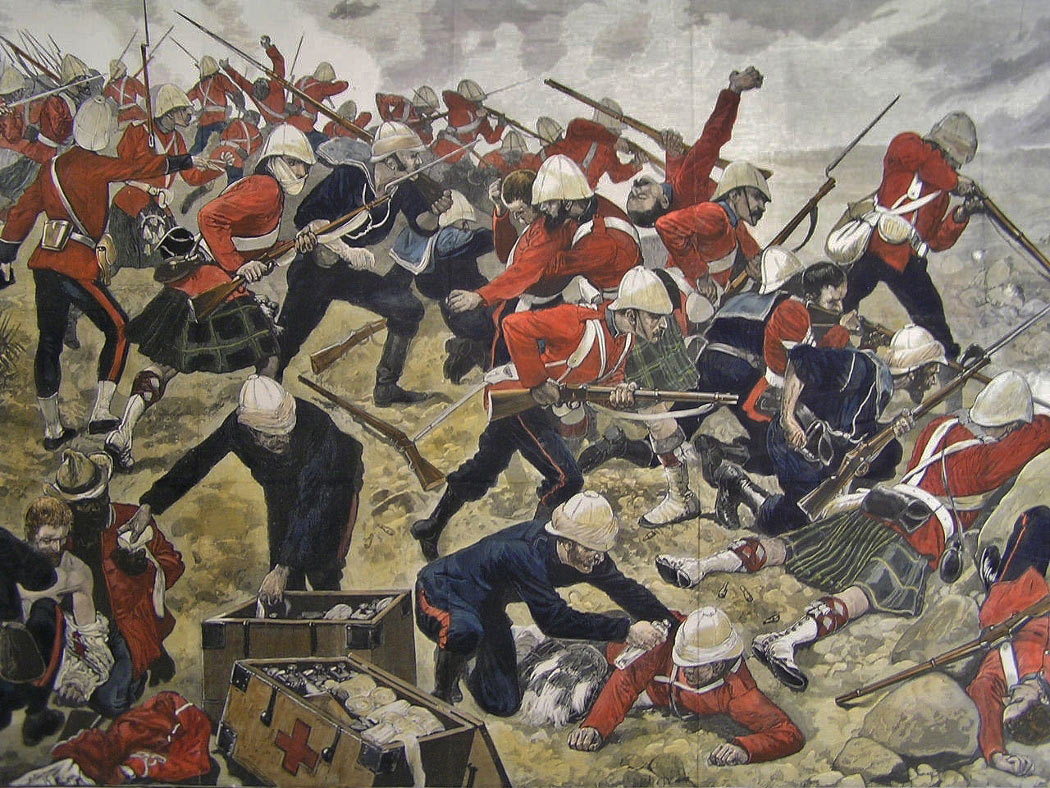
The Battle of Majuba Hill was the last decisive battle during the First Boer War.

The Boer republics successfully resisted British encroachments during the First Boer War (1880–1881) using guerrilla warfare tactics, which were well-suited to local conditions. The British returned with greater numbers, more experience, and new strategy in the Second Boer War (1899–1902) and, although suffering heavy casualties due to Boer attrition warfare, were ultimately successful due in part to scorched earth tactics and concentration camps, in which 27,000 Boer civilians died due to a combination of disease and neglect. South Africa's urban population grew rapidly from the end of the 19th century onward. After the devastation of the wars, Boer farmers fled into Transvaal and Orange Free State cities, many of whom would come to constitute an urban class of "poor whites".

Anti-British policies among white South Africans focused on independence. During the Dutch and British colonial years, racial segregation was mostly informal, though some legislation was enacted to control the settlement and movement of indigenous people, including the Native Location Act of 1879 and the system of pass laws.

Eight years after the end of the Second Boer War, and after four years of negotiation, the South Africa Act 1909 created the Union of South Africa on 31 May 1910, granting the country nominal independence. The union was a dominion that included the former territories of the Cape, Transvaal and Natal colonies, as well as the Orange Free State republic. The Natives Land Act of 1913, which was passed by the British ruling the Parliament of the newly formed Union of South Africa, severely restricted the ownership of land by black South Africans, who at that stage controlled only 7% of the country. The amount of land reserved for indigenous peoples was later marginally increased.

In 1931, the union became fully sovereign from the United Kingdom with the passage of the Statute of Westminster, which abolished the last powers of the Parliament of the United Kingdom to legislate in the country. In 1934, the South African Party and National Party merged to form the United Party, seeking reconciliation between Afrikaners and English-speaking whites. In 1939, the party split over the entry of the Union into World War II as an ally of the United Kingdom, a move which National Party followers opposed.

=== Apartheid era ===
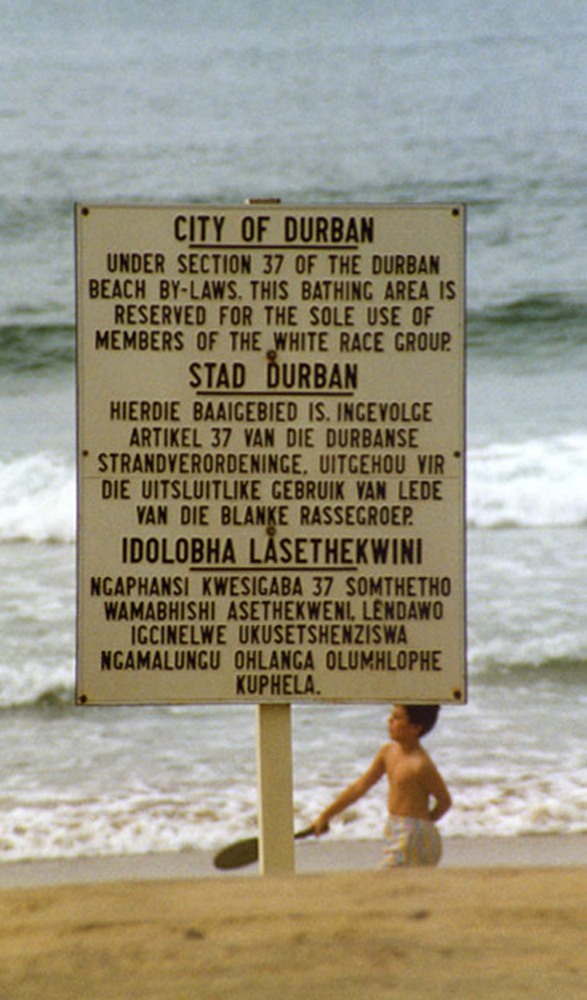
A trilingual apartheid-era beach sign (English, Afrikaans, isiZulu) stating that the bathing area was reserved for the "white race group", Durban, 1989

In 1948, the National Party was elected to power. It strengthened the racial segregation begun under Dutch and British colonial rule. Taking Canada's Indian Act as a framework, the nationalist government classified all peoples into three races (being "Whites", "Blacks", and "Indians and Coloured people") and developed rights and limitations for each. The white-led minoritarian government instituted a policy of legally institutionalised segregation which came to be known as apartheid. While whites enjoyed a higher standard of living comparable to First World Western nations, the black majority remained disadvantaged by almost every standard, including income, education, housing, and life expectancy. The Freedom Charter, adopted in 1955 by the Congress Alliance, which was multi-racial in makeup, demanded a non-racial society and an end to discrimination.

On 31 May 1961, the country became a republic following a referendum (only open to white voters) which narrowly passed; the British-dominated Natal province largely voted against the proposal. Elizabeth II lost the title Queen of South Africa, and the last Governor-General, Charles Robberts Swart, became state president. As a concession to the Westminster system, the appointment of the president remained by parliament, and the position was virtually powerless until P. W. Botha's Constitution Act of 1983, which eliminated the office of prime minister and instated a unique "strong presidency" responsible to parliament. Pressured by other Commonwealth of Nations countries, South Africa withdrew from the organisation in 1961.

Despite opposition to apartheid both within and outside the country from all racial backgrounds, the government legislated for a continuation of apartheid. The security forces cracked down on internal dissent, and violence became widespread, with anti-apartheid organisations such as the African National Congress (ANC), the Azanian People's Organisation, and the Pan-Africanist Congress carrying out guerrilla warfare, urban sabotage and, according to Oxford Academic, acts of terrorism. The three rival resistance movements also engaged in occasional inter-factional clashes as they jockeyed for domestic influence. Apartheid became increasingly controversial, and several countries began to boycott business with the South African government because of its racial policies. The boycotts and restrictions were later extended to international sanctions and the divestment of holdings by foreign investors.

=== Post-apartheid ===
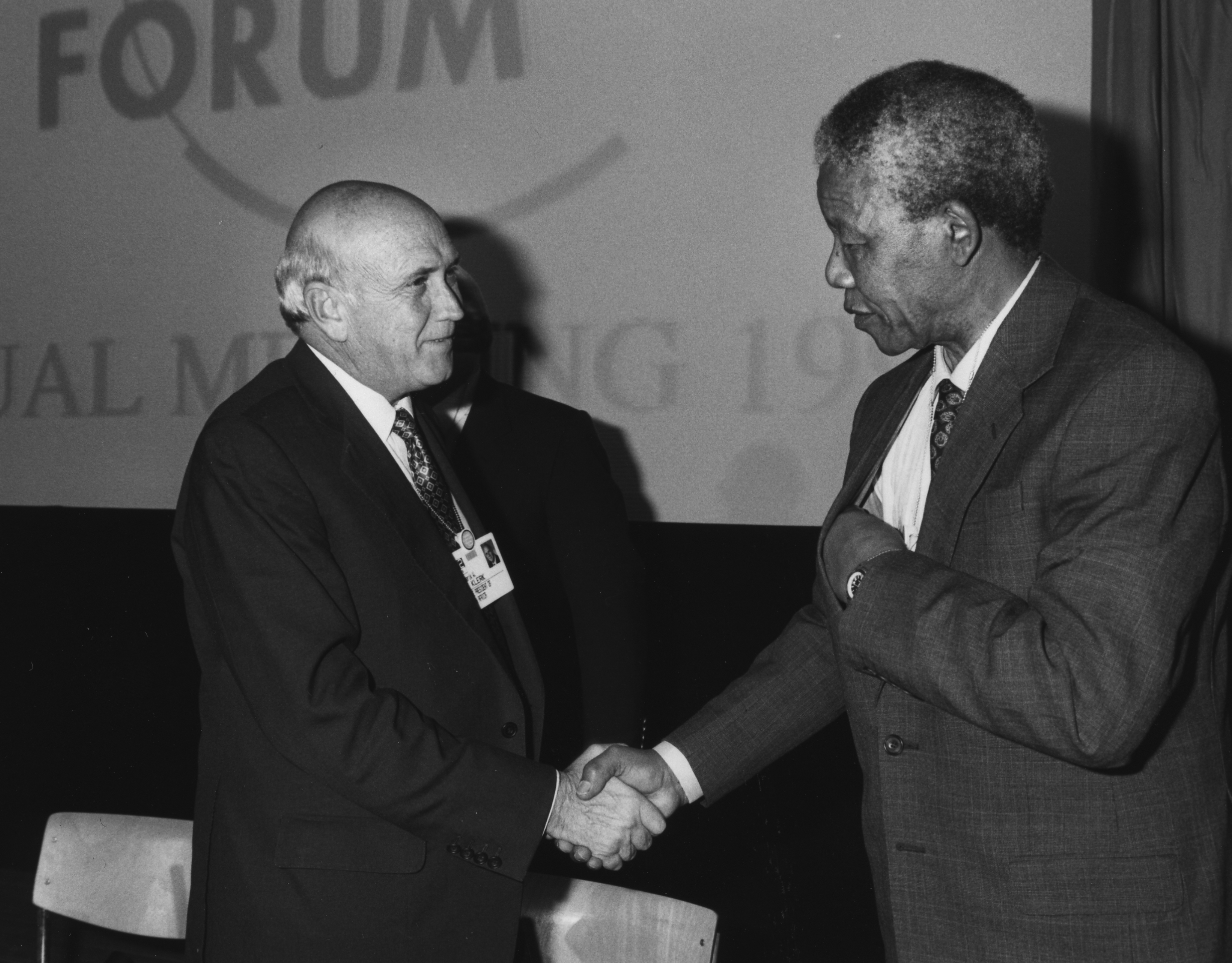
F.W. de Klerk and Nelson Mandela shake hands in January 1992.

The Mahlabatini Declaration of Faith, signed by Mangosuthu Buthelezi and Harry Schwarz in 1974, enshrined the principles of peaceful transition of power and equality for all, the first of such agreements by black and white political leaders in South Africa. Ultimately, F.W. de Klerk opened bilateral discussions with Nelson Mandela in 1993 for a transition of policies and government.

In 1990, the National Party government took the first step towards dismantling apartheid when it lifted the ban on the ANC and other political organisations. It released Nelson Mandela from prison after 27 years of serving a sentence for sabotage and treason. A negotiation process followed. With approval from the white electorate in a 1992 referendum, the government continued negotiations to end apartheid. South Africa held its first universal elections in 1994, which the ANC won by an overwhelming majority. The country rejoined the Commonwealth of Nations and became a member of the Southern African Development Community.

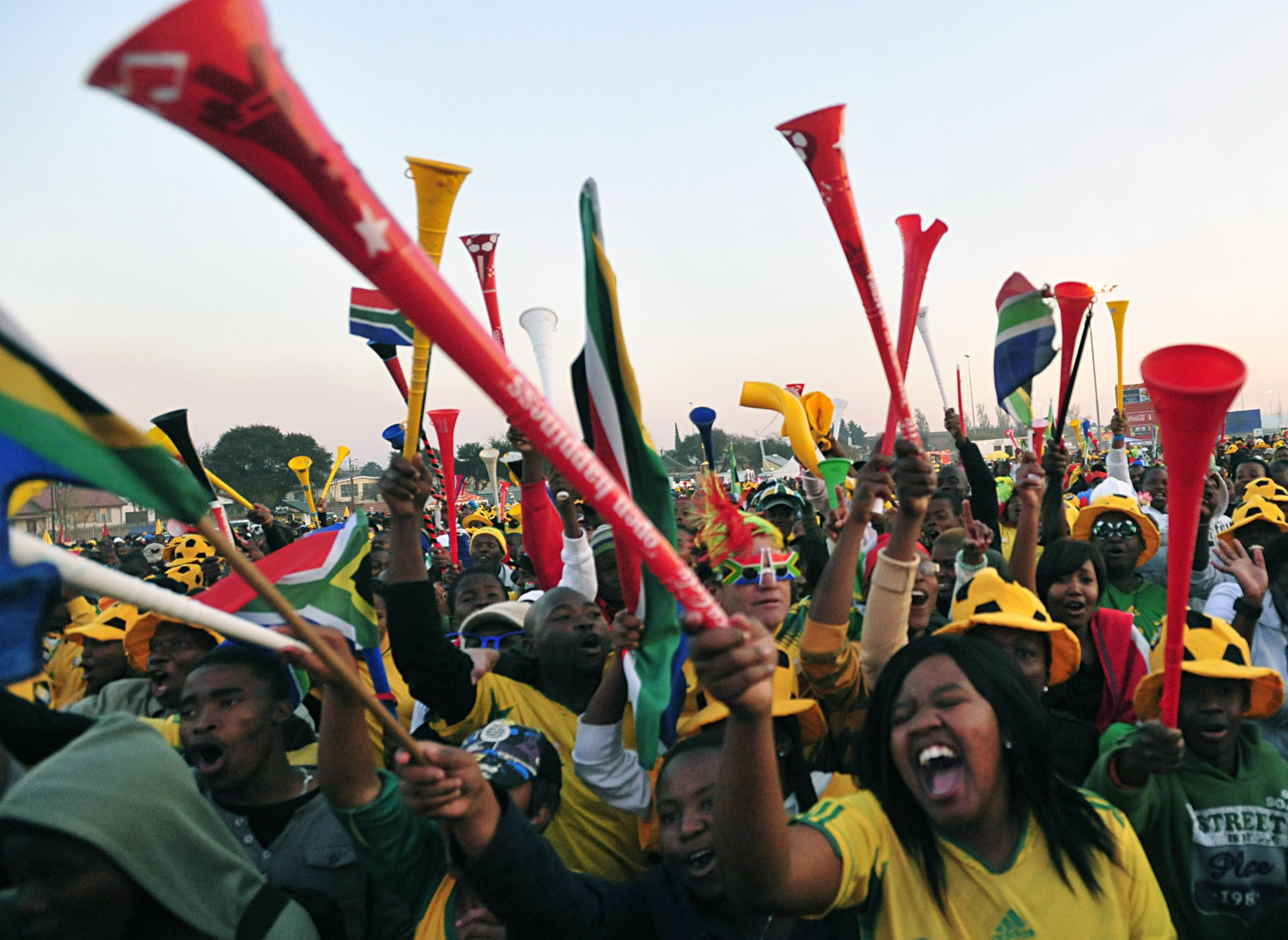
Supporters watching the 2010 FIFA World Cup with vuvuzelas in the township of Soweto, a suburb of Johannesburg

The post-apartheid period, whilst plagued by high unemployment and increasing income inequality, has been characterised by relative political stability. The country has, however, seen periodic outbreaks of violence, most notably the 2008 xenophobic riots—during which over 60 people were killed, and an estimated 100,000 people were driven from their homes—and the Marikana massacre, which constituted the most lethal use of force by South African security forces against civilians since the Soweto uprising. Widespread political corruption and state capture took place under the presidency of Jacob Zuma, whose brief imprisonment for contempt of court during the course of his trial for corruption in 2021 led to widespread unrest which left 354 people dead.

The electoral dominance of the ANC has gradually declined since the early 2000s, with the party failing to secure a parliamentary majority for the first time in the 2024 general election. President Cyril Ramaphosa subsequently formed the Government of National Unity with, amongst others, the Democratic Alliance.

== Geography ==
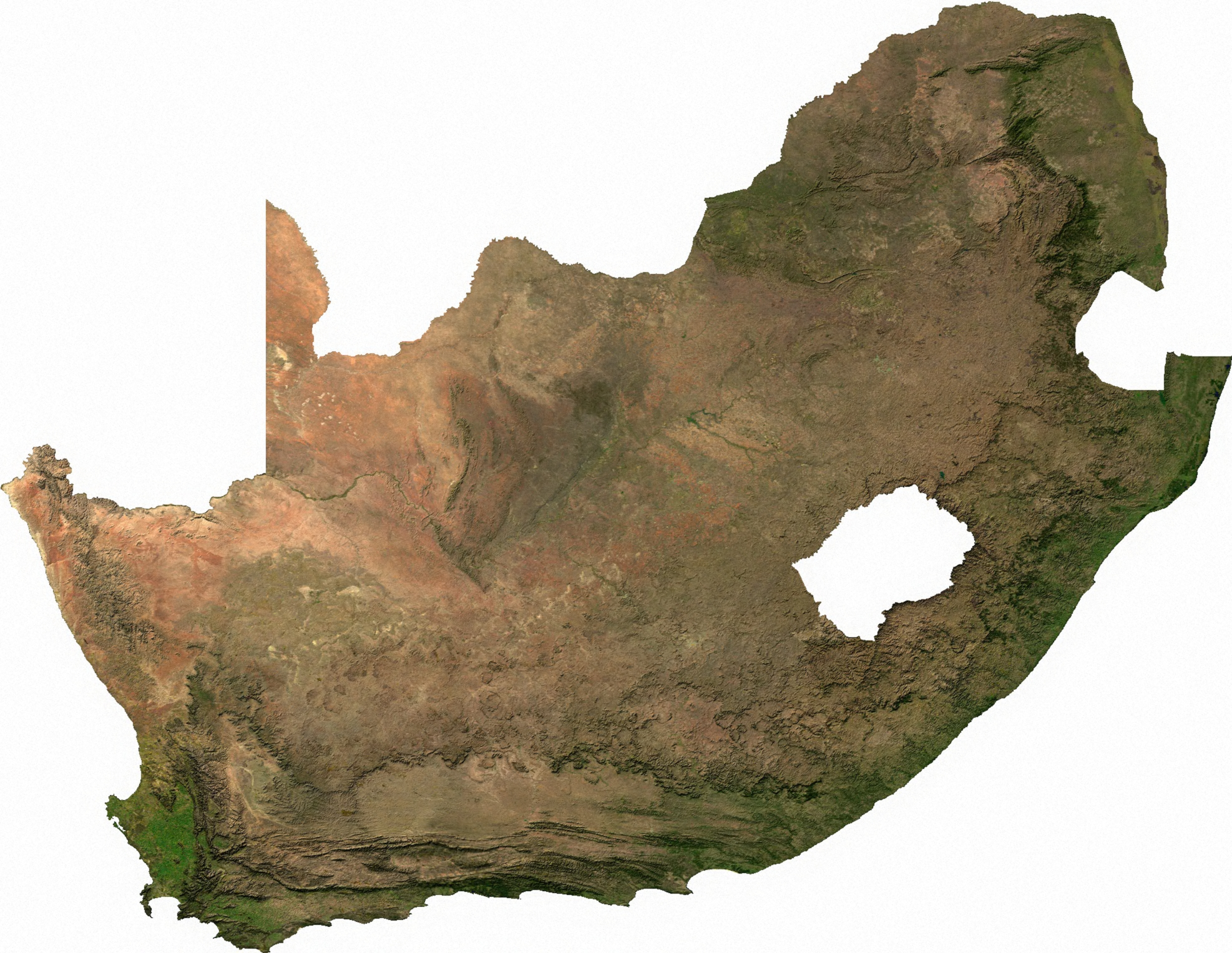
Satellite image of South Africa

South Africa is in southern Africa, with a coastline that stretches more than 2,500 km (1,553 mi) and along two oceans—the South Atlantic and the Indian Ocean. At 1,219,912 km^{2} (471,011 sq mi) in area, South Africa is the 24th-largest country in the world. Excluding the Prince Edward Islands, the country lies between latitudes 22° and 35°S, and longitudes 16° and 33°E. The interior of South Africa consists of a large, and in most places almost flat, plateau with an altitude of between 1,000 and 2,100 m (3,300 and 6,900 ft). It is highest in the east and slopes gently downwards towards the west and north, and slightly to the south and south-west. This plateau is surrounded by the Great Escarpment whose eastern, and highest, stretch is known as the Drakensberg. Mafadi in the Drakensberg is the highest peak in the country at 3,450 m (11,320 ft) above sea level. The KwaZulu-Natal–Lesotho international border is formed by the highest portion of the Great Escarpment which reaches an altitude of over 3,000 m (9,800 ft).

The south and south-western parts of the plateau (at approximately 1,100–1,800 m above sea level) and the adjoining plain below (at approximately 700–800 m above sea level – see map on the right) are together known as the Great Karoo, which consists of sparsely populated shrubland. To the north, the Great Karoo fades into the more arid Bushmanland, which eventually becomes the Kalahari Desert in the north-west of the country. The mid-eastern and highest part of the plateau is known as the Highveld. This relatively well-watered area is home to a great proportion of the country's commercial farmlands and contains its largest conurbation, Gauteng. To the north of the Highveld, from about the 25° 30' S line of latitude, the plateau slopes downwards into the Bushveld, which ultimately gives way to the Limpopo River lowlands, the Lowveld.

The coastal belt, below the Great Escarpment, moving clockwise from the northeast, consists of the Limpopo Lowveld, which merges into the Mpumalanga Lowveld, below the Mpumalanga Drakensberg (the eastern portion of the Great Escarpment). This is hotter, drier and less intensely cultivated than the Highveld above the escarpment. The Kruger National Park, located in the provinces of Limpopo and Mpumalanga in north-eastern South Africa, occupies a large portion of the Lowveld, covering 19,633 square kilometres (7,580 sq mi)

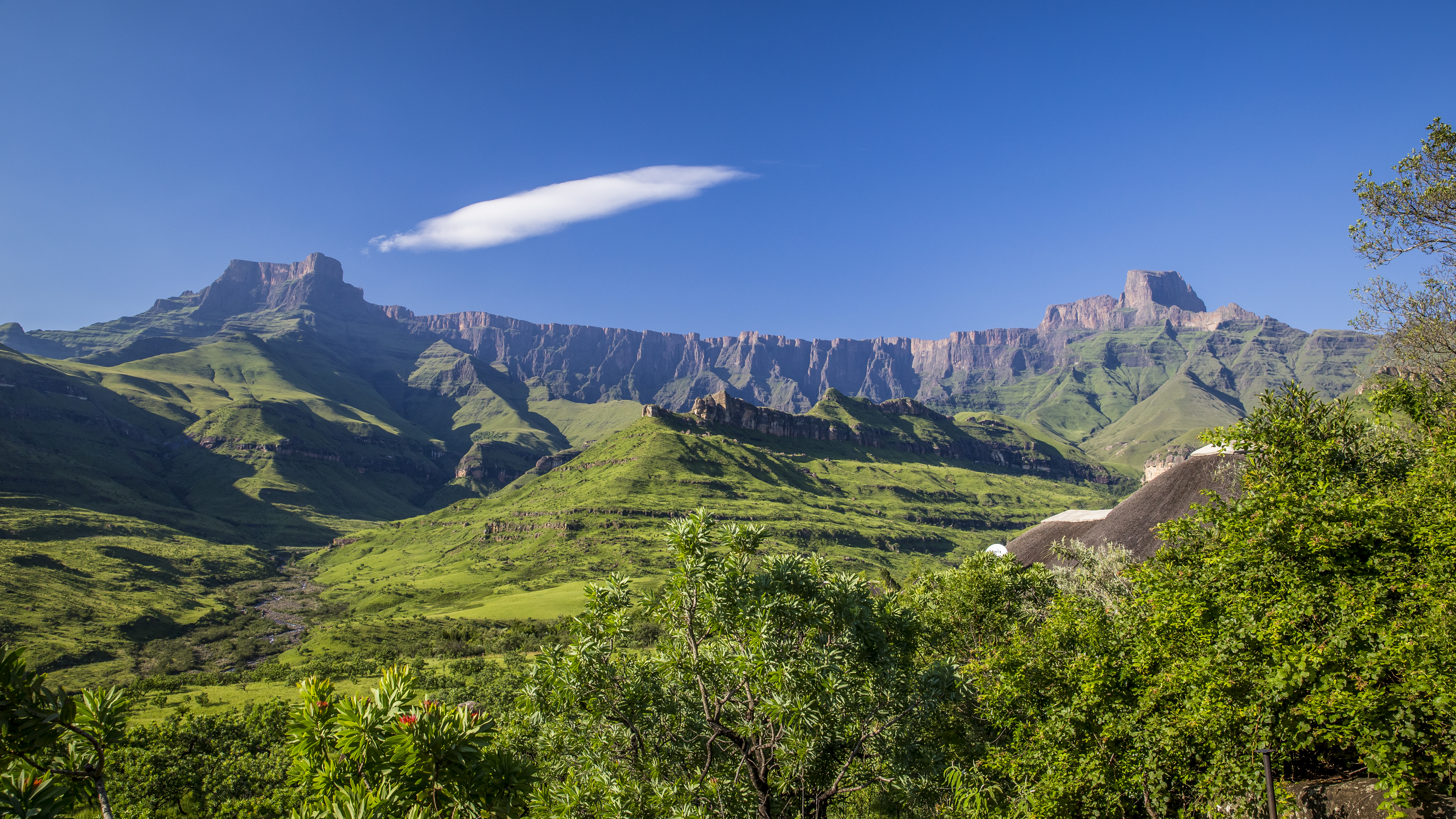
Drakensberg, the eastern and highest portion of the Great Escarpment which surrounds the east, south and western borders of the central plateau

The coastal belt below the south and south-western stretches of the Great Escarpment contains several ranges of Cape Fold Mountains which run parallel to the coast, separating the Great Escarpment from the ocean. The land between the Outeniqua and Langeberg ranges to the south and the Swartberg range to the north is known as the Little Karoo, which consists of semi-desert shrubland similar to that of the Great Karoo, except that its northern strip along the foothills of the Swartberg Mountains has a somewhat higher rainfall and is, therefore, more cultivated than the Great Karoo.

The Little Karoo is famous for its ostrich farming around Oudtshoorn. The lowland area to the north of the Swartberg range up to the Great Escarpment is the lowland part of the Great Karoo, which is climatically and botanically almost indistinguishable from the Karoo above the Great Escarpment. The narrow coastal strip between the Outeniqua and Langeberg ranges and the ocean, known as the Garden Route, has a moderately high year-round rainfall, and hosts the most extensive area of forest in the country.

In the south-west corner of the country, the Cape Peninsula forms the southernmost tip of the coastal strip which borders the Atlantic Ocean and ultimately terminates at the country's border with Namibia at the Orange River. The Cape Peninsula has a Mediterranean climate, making it and its immediate surrounds the only portion of Sub-Saharan Africa which receives most of its rainfall in winter.

The coastal belt to the north of the Cape Peninsula is bounded on the west by the Atlantic Ocean and the first row of north–south running Cape Fold Mountains to the east. The Cape Fold Mountains peter out at about the 32° S line of latitude, after which the Great Escarpment bounds the coastal plain. The most southerly portion of this coastal belt is known as the Swartland and Malmesbury Plain, which is an important wheat-growing region, relying on winter rains. The region further north is known as Namaqualand, which becomes more arid near the Orange River. The little rain that falls tends to fall in winter, which results in one of the world's most spectacular displays of flowers carpeting huge stretches of veld in spring (August–September).

South Africa also has one offshore possession, the small sub-Antarctic archipelago of the Prince Edward Islands, consisting of Marion Island (290 km^{2} or 110 sq mi) and Prince Edward Island (45 km^{2} or 17 sq mi).

=== Climate ===
Köppen climate types of South Africa

South Africa has a generally temperate climate because it is surrounded by the Atlantic and Indian Oceans on three sides, because it is located in the climatically milder Southern Hemisphere, and because its average elevation rises steadily toward the north (toward the equator) and further inland. This varied topography and oceanic influence result in a great variety of climatic zones. The climatic zones range from the extreme desert of the southern Namib in the farthest northwest to the lush subtropical climate in the east along the border with Mozambique and the Indian Ocean. Winters in South Africa occur between June and August. The extreme southwest has a climate similar to that of the Mediterranean with wet winters and hot, dry summers, hosting the famous fynbos biome of shrubland and thicket. This area produces much of the wine in South Africa and is known for its wind, which blows intermittently almost all year. The severity of this wind made passing around the Cape of Good Hope particularly treacherous for sailors, causing many shipwrecks. Further east on the south coast, rainfall is distributed more evenly throughout the year, producing a green landscape. The annual rainfall increases south of the Lowveld, especially near the coast, which is subtropical. The Free State is particularly flat because it lies centrally on the high plateau. North of the Vaal River, the Highveld becomes better watered and does not experience subtropical extremes of heat. Johannesburg, in the centre of the Highveld, is at 1,740 m (5,709 ft) above sea level and receives an annual rainfall of 760 mm (29.9 in). Winters in this region are cold, although snow is rare.

The coldest place on mainland South Africa is Buffelsfontein in the Eastern Cape, where a temperature of −20.1 °C (−4.2 °F) was recorded in 2013. The Prince Edward Islands have colder average annual temperatures, but Buffelsfontein has colder extremes. The deep interior of mainland South Africa has the hottest temperatures: a temperature of 51.7 °C (125.06 °F) was recorded in 1948 in the Northern Cape Kalahari near Upington, but this temperature is unofficial and was not recorded with standard equipment; the official highest temperature is 48.8 °C (119.84 °F) at Vioolsdrif in January 1993.

Climate change in South Africa is leading to increased temperatures and rainfall variability. Extreme weather events are becoming more prominent. This is a critical concern for South Africans as climate change will affect the overall status and wellbeing of the country, for example with regards to water resources. Speedy environmental changes are resulting in clear effects on the community and environmental level in different ways and aspects, starting with air quality, to temperature and weather patterns, reaching out to food security and disease burden. According to computer-generated climate modelling produced by the South African National Biodiversity Institute, parts of southern Africa will see an increase in temperature by about 1 °C (1.8 °F) along the coast to more than 4 °C (7.2 °F) in the already hot hinterland such as the Northern Cape in late spring and summertime by 2050. The Cape Floral Region is predicted to be hit very hard by climate change. Drought, increased intensity and frequency of fire, and climbing temperatures are expected to push many rare species towards extinction. South Africa has published two national climate change reports in 2011 and 2016. South Africa contributes considerable carbon dioxide emissions, being the 14th largest emitter of carbon dioxide, primarily from its heavy reliance on coal and oil for energy production. As part of its international commitments, South Africa has pledged to peak emissions between 2020 and 2025.

=== Biodiversity ===
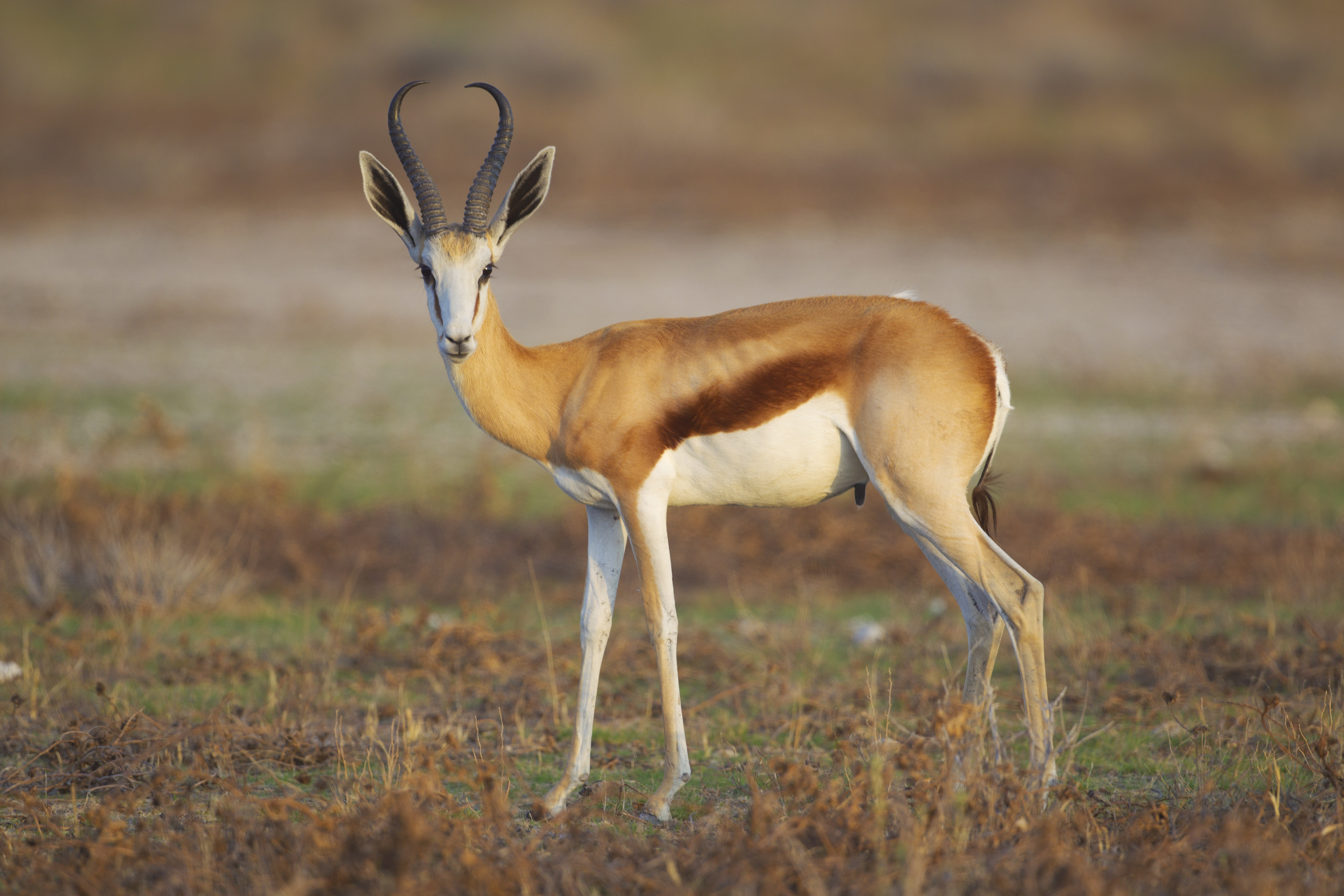
The national animal of South Africa is the springbok.

South Africa signed the Rio Convention on Biological Diversity on 4 June 1994 and became a party to the convention on 2 November 1995. It has subsequently produced a National Biodiversity Strategy and Action Plan, which was received by the convention on 7 June 2006. The country is ranked sixth out of the world's seventeen megadiverse countries. Ecotourism in South Africa has become more prevalent in recent years, as a possible method of maintaining and improving biodiversity.

Numerous mammals are found in the Bushveld including lions, African leopards, South African cheetahs, southern white rhinos, blue wildebeest, kudus, impalas, hyenas, hippopotamuses and South African giraffes. A significant extent of the Bushveld exists in the north-east including Kruger National Park and the Sabi Sand Game Reserve, as well as in the far north in the Waterberg Biosphere. South Africa houses many endemic species, among them the critically endangered riverine rabbit (Bunolagus monticullaris) in the Karoo.

Up to 1945, more than 4,900 species of fungi (including lichen-forming species) had been recorded. In 2006, the number of fungi in South Africa was estimated at 200,000 species but did not take into account fungi associated with insects. If correct, then the number of South African fungi dwarfs that of its plants. In at least some major South African ecosystems, an exceptionally high percentage of fungi are highly specific in terms of the plants with which they occur. The country's Biodiversity Strategy and Action Plan does not mention fungi (including lichen-forming fungi).

With more than 22,000 different vascular plants, or about 9% of all the known species of plants on Earth, South Africa is particularly rich in plant diversity. The most prevalent biome is the grassland, particularly on the Highveld, where the plant cover is dominated by different grasses, low shrubs, and acacia, mainly camel-thorn (Vachellia erioloba). Vegetation is sparse towards the north-west because of low rainfall. There are numerous species of water-storing succulents, like aloes and euphorbias, in the very hot and dry Namaqualand area. And according to the World Wildlife Fund, South Africa is home to around a third of all succulent species. The grass and thorn savanna turns slowly into a bush savanna towards the north-east of the country, with denser growth. There are significant numbers of baobab trees in this area, near the northern end of Kruger National Park.

The fynbos biome, which makes up the majority of the area and plant life in the Cape Floristic Region, is located in a small region of the Western Cape and contains more than 9,000 of those species, or three times more plant species than found in the Amazon rainforest, making it among the richest regions on Earth in terms of plant diversity. Most of the plants are evergreen hard-leaf plants with fine, needle-like leaves, such as the sclerophyllous plants. Another uniquely South African flowering plant group is the genus Protea, with around 130 different species. While South Africa has a great wealth of flowering plants, only 1% of the land is forest, almost exclusively in the humid coastal plain of KwaZulu-Natal, where there are also areas of Southern Africa mangroves in river mouths. Even smaller reserves of forests are out of the reach of fire, known as montane forests. Plantations of imported tree species are predominant, particularly the non-native eucalyptus and pine.

South Africa has lost a large area of natural habitat in the last four decades, primarily because of overpopulation, sprawling development patterns, and deforestation during the 19th century. The country had a 2019 Forest Landscape Integrity Index mean score of 4.94/10, ranking it 112th globally out of 172 countries. South Africa is one of the worst affected countries in the world when it comes to invasion by alien species with many (e.g., black wattle, Port Jackson willow, Hakea, Lantana and Jacaranda) posing a significant threat to the native biodiversity and the already scarce water resources. Also, woody plant encroachment of native plants in grasslands poses a threat to biodiversity and related ecosystem services, affecting over 7 million hectares. The original temperate forest found by the first European settlers was exploited until only small patches remained. Currently, South African hardwood trees like real yellowwood (Podocarpus latifolius), stinkwood (Ocotea bullata), and South African black ironwood (Olea capensis) are under strict government protection. Statistics from the Department of Environmental Affairs show a record 1,215 rhinos were killed in 2014. Since South Africa is home to a third of all succulent species (many endemic to the Karoo), it makes it a hotspot for plant poaching, leading to many species to be threatened with extinction.

== Government and politics ==
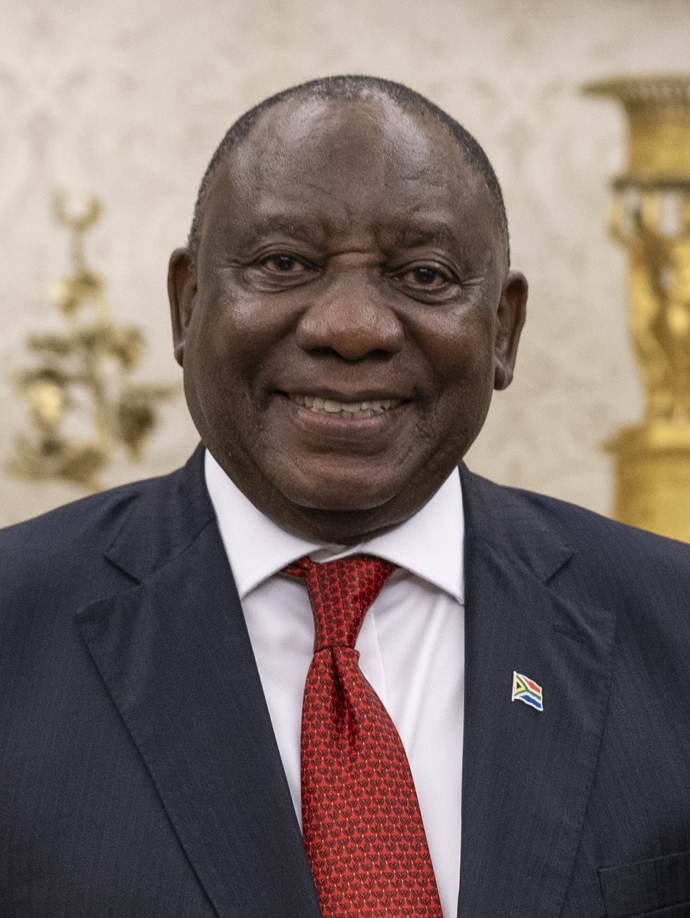
Cyril Ramaphosa
President

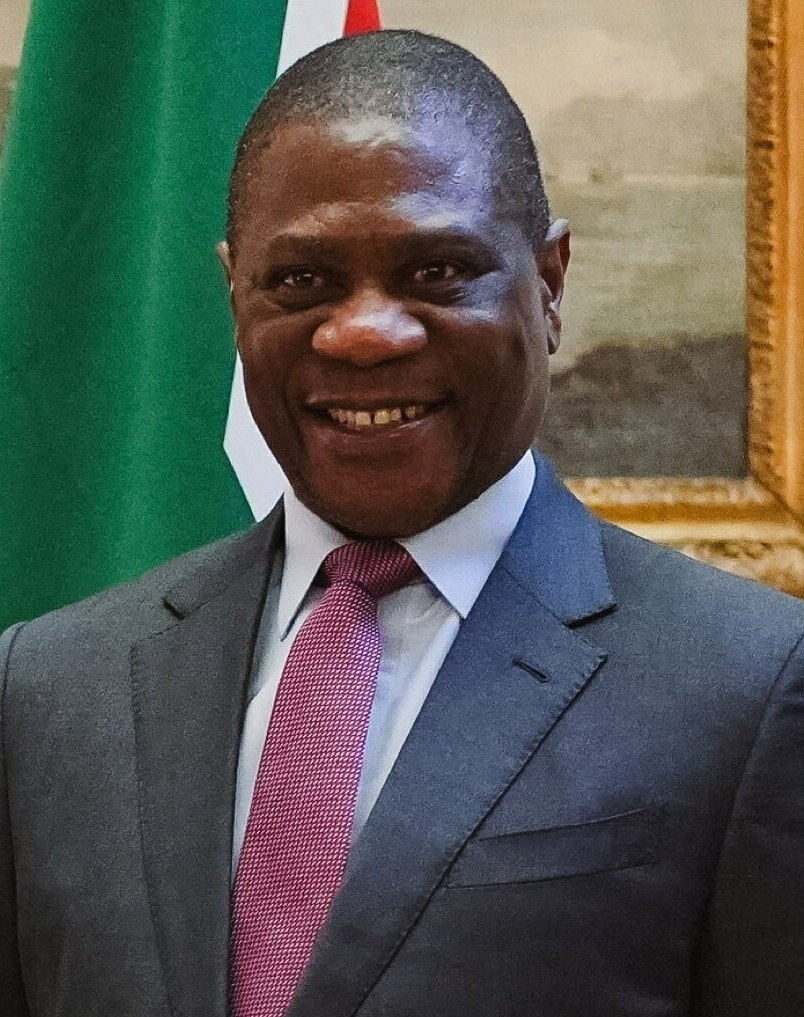
Paul Mashatile
Deputy President

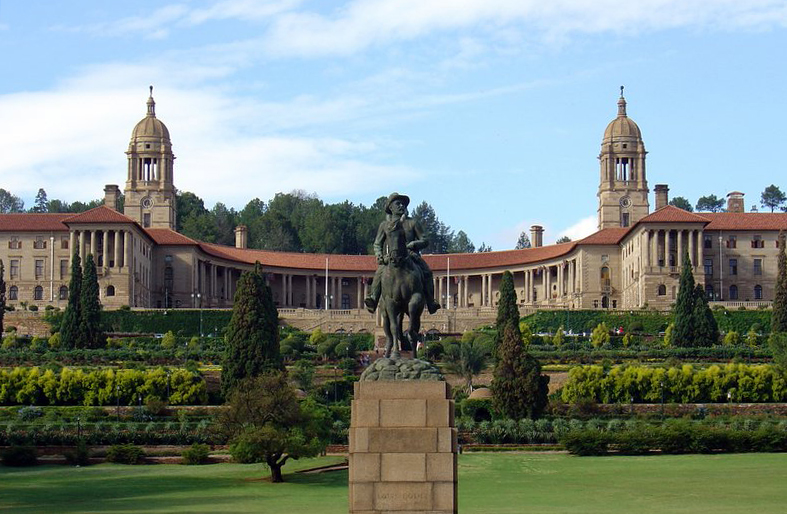
Union Buildings in Pretoria, seat of the executive

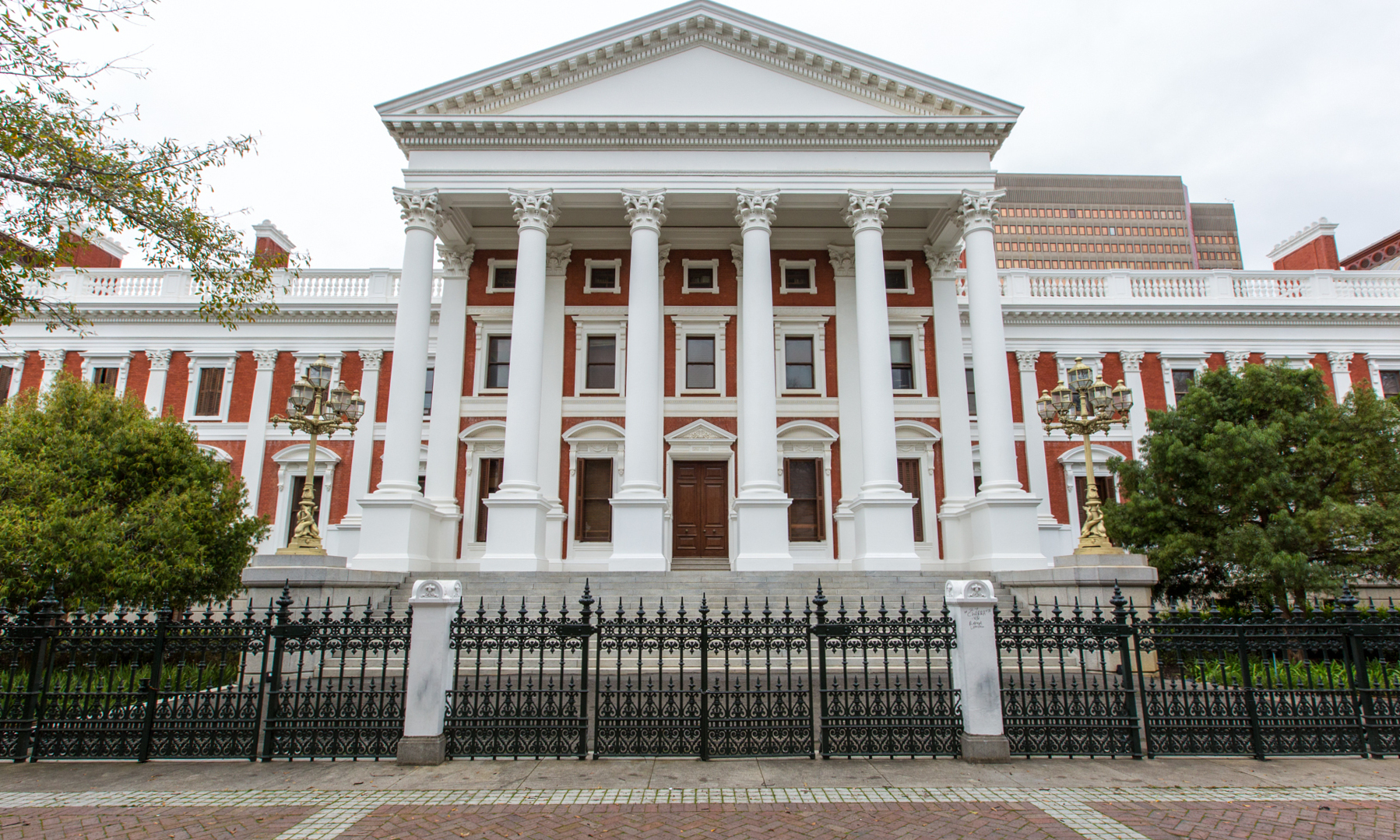
Houses of Parliament in Cape Town, seat of the legislature

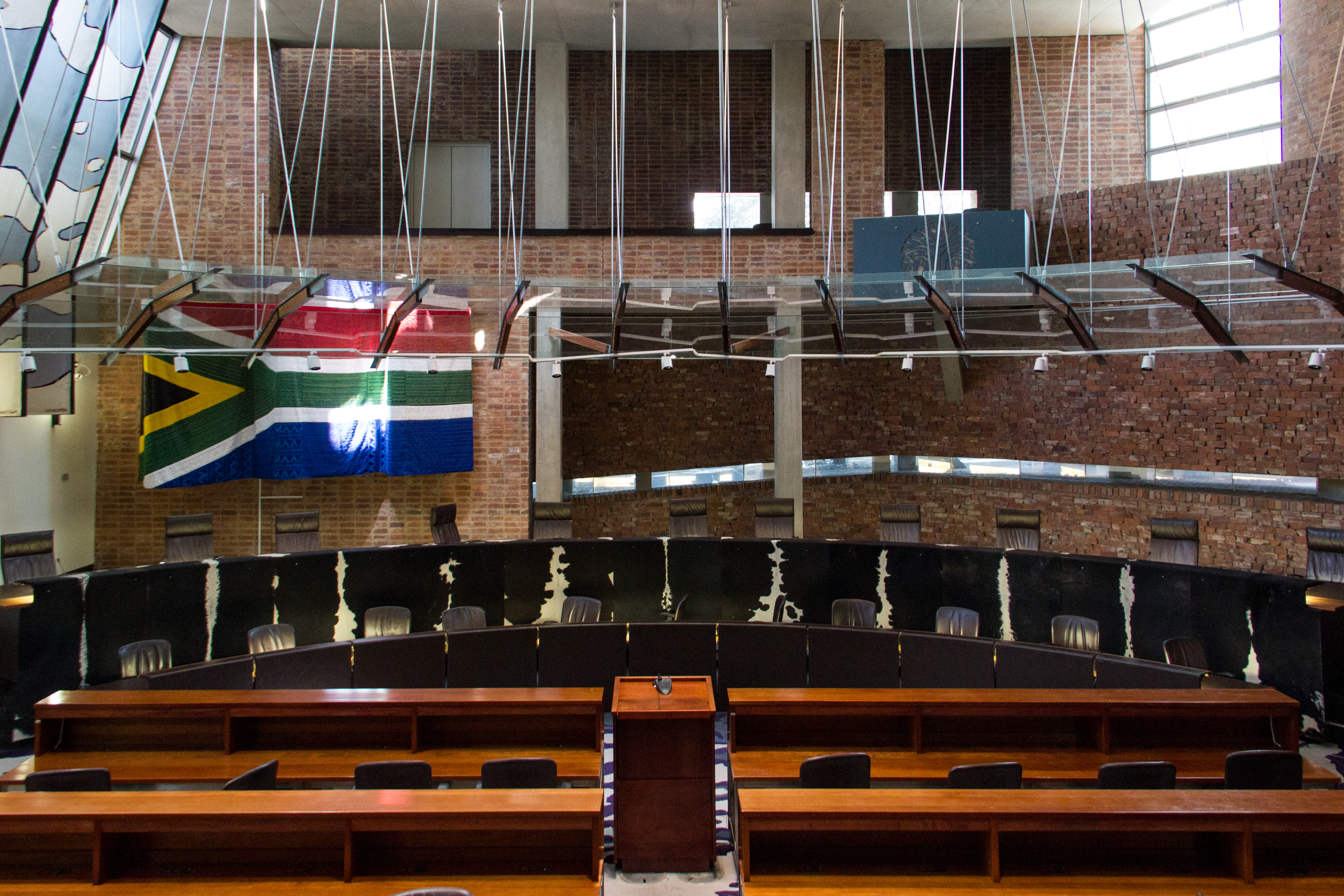
Constitutional Court in Johannesburg

South Africa is a parliamentary republic, but unlike most such republics, the president is both head of state and head of government and depends for their tenure on the confidence of Parliament. The executive, legislature, and judiciary are all subject to the supremacy of the Constitution of South Africa, and the superior courts have the power to strike down executive actions and acts of Parliament if they are unconstitutional. The National Assembly, the lower house of Parliament, consists of 400 members and is elected every five years by a system of party-list proportional representation. The National Council of Provinces, the upper house, consists of ninety members, with each of the nine provincial legislatures electing ten members.

After each parliamentary election, the National Assembly elects one of its members as president; hence the president serves a term of office the same as that of the Assembly, normally five years. No president may serve more than two terms in office. The president appoints a deputy president and ministers (each representing a department) who form the cabinet. The National Assembly may remove the president and the cabinet by a motion of no confidence. In the most recent election, held on 29 May 2024, the ANC lost its majority for the first time since the end of Apartheid, winning only 40% of the vote and 159 seats, while the main opposition, the Democratic Alliance (DA), won 22% of the vote and 87 seats. uMkhonto weSizwe, a new party founded by former President and ANC leader Jacob Zuma, won 14.6% of the vote and 58 seats, while the Economic Freedom Fighters, founded by Julius Malema, former president of the ANC Youth League who was later expelled from the ANC, won 9.5% of the vote and 39 seats. After the election, the ANC formed a Government of National Unity with the DA and several smaller parties.

South Africa has no legally defined capital city. The fourth chapter of the constitution states "The seat of Parliament is Cape Town, but an Act of Parliament enacted in accordance with section 76(1) and (5) may determine that the seat of Parliament is elsewhere." The country's three branches of government are split over different cities. Cape Town, as the seat of Parliament, is the legislative capital; Pretoria, as the seat of the president and cabinet, is the administrative capital; and Bloemfontein is the seat of the Supreme Court of Appeal, and is regarded as the judicial capital; although the highest court, the Constitutional Court of South Africa has been based in Johannesburg since 1994. Most foreign embassies are located in Pretoria.

Since 2004, South Africa has had many thousands of popular protests, some violent, making it, according to one academic, the "most protest-rich country in the world". There have been numerous incidents of political repression as well as threats of future repression in violation of the constitution, leading some analysts and civil society organisations to conclude that there is or could be a new climate of political repression.

In 2022, South Africa was placed sixth out of 48 sub-Saharan African countries on the Ibrahim Index of African Governance. South Africa scored well in the categories of Rule of Law, Transparency, Corruption, Participation and Human Rights, but scored low in Safety and Security. In 2006, South Africa became one of the first jurisdictions in the world to legalise same-sex marriage.

The Constitution of South Africa is the supreme rule of law in the country. The primary sources of South African law are Roman-Dutch mercantile law and personal law and English Common law, as imports of Dutch settlements and British colonialism. The first European-based law in South Africa was brought by the Dutch East India Company and is called Roman-Dutch law. It was imported before the codification of European law into the Napoleonic Code and is comparable in many ways to Scots law. This was followed in the 19th century by English law, both common and statutory. After unification in 1910, South Africa had its own parliament which passed laws specific for South Africa, building on those previously passed for the individual member colonies. The judicial system consists of the magistrates' courts, which hear lesser criminal cases and smaller civil cases; the High Court, which has divisions that serve as the courts of general jurisdiction for specific areas; the Supreme Court of Appeal; and the Constitutional Court, which is the highest court.

=== Administrative divisions ===
Provinces of South Africa

Each of the nine provinces is governed by a unicameral legislature, which is elected every five years by party-list proportional representation. The legislature elects a premier as head of government, and the premier appoints an Executive Council as a provincial cabinet. The powers of provincial governments are limited to topics listed in the constitution; these topics include such fields as health, education, public housing and transport.

The provinces are in turn divided into 52 districts: eight metropolitan and 44 district municipalities. The district municipalities are further subdivided into 205 local municipalities. The metropolitan municipalities, which govern the largest urban agglomerations, perform the functions of both district and local municipalities.

| Province | Provincial capital | Largest city | Area (km^{2}) | Population (2022) |
|---|---|---|---|---|
| Eastern Cape | Bhisho | Gqeberha | 168,966 | 7,230,204 |
| Free State | Bloemfontein | Bloemfontein | 129,825 | 2,964,412 |
| Gauteng | Johannesburg | Johannesburg | 18,178 | 15,099,422 |
| KwaZulu-Natal | Pietermaritzburg | Durban | 94,361 | 12,423,907 |
| Limpopo | Polokwane | Polokwane | 125,754 | 6,572,720 |
| Mpumalanga | Mbombela | Mbombela | 76,495 | 5,143,324 |
| North West | Mahikeng | Klerksdorp | 104,882 | 3,804,548 |
| Northern Cape | Kimberley | Kimberley | 372,889 | 1,355,946 |
| Western Cape | Cape Town | Cape Town | 129,462 | 7,433,019 |

=== Foreign relations ===
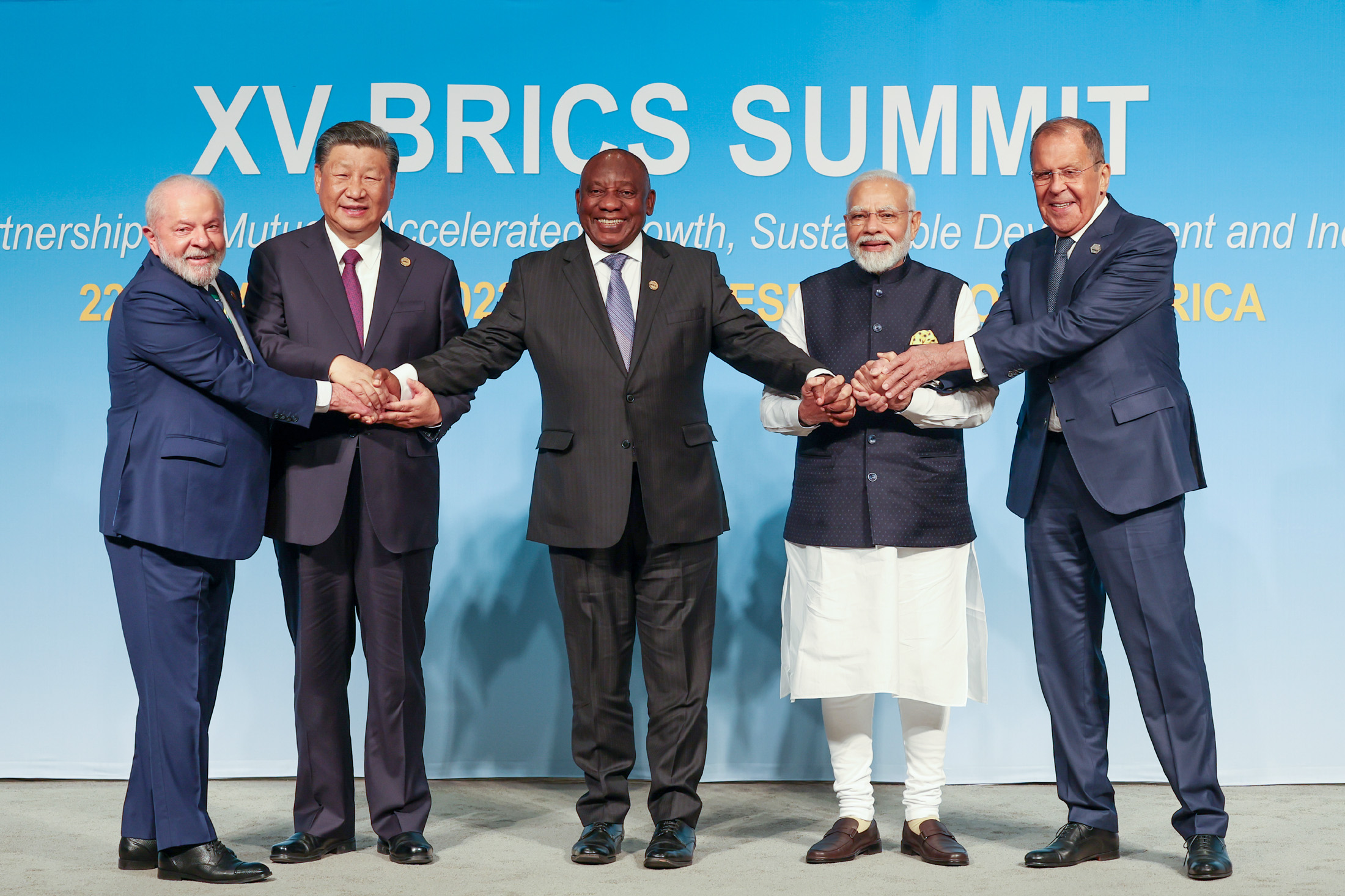
Ramaphosa and other BRICS leaders during the 15th BRICS Summit in Johannesburg, August 2023

As the Union of South Africa, the country is a founding member of the United Nations (UN), with Prime Minister Jan Smuts writing the preamble to the UN Charter. South Africa is one of the founding members of the African Union (AU) and has the largest economy of all the members. It is a founding member of the AU's New Partnership for Africa's Development. After apartheid ended, South Africa was readmitted to the Commonwealth of Nations. The country is a member of the Group of 77 and chaired the organisation in 2006. South Africa is also a member of the Southern African Development Community, South Atlantic Peace and Cooperation Zone, Southern African Customs Union, Antarctic Treaty System, World Trade Organization, International Monetary Fund, G20, G8+5, and the Port Management Association of Eastern and Southern Africa.

South Africa has played a key role as a mediator in African conflicts over the last decade, such as in Burundi, the Democratic Republic of the Congo, Comoros, Mozambique and Zimbabwe.

President Jacob Zuma and Chinese President Hu Jintao upgraded bilateral ties between the two countries in 2010 when they signed the Beijing Agreement which elevated South Africa's earlier "strategic partnership" with China to the higher level of "comprehensive strategic partnership" in both economic and political affairs, including the strengthening of exchanges between their respective ruling parties and legislatures. In 2011, South Africa joined the Brazil-Russia-India-China (BRICS) grouping of countries, identified by Zuma as the country's largest trading partners and also the largest trading partners with Africa as a whole. Zuma asserted that BRICS member countries would also work with each other through the UN, G20, and the India, Brazil South Africa (IBSA) forum.

=== Military ===
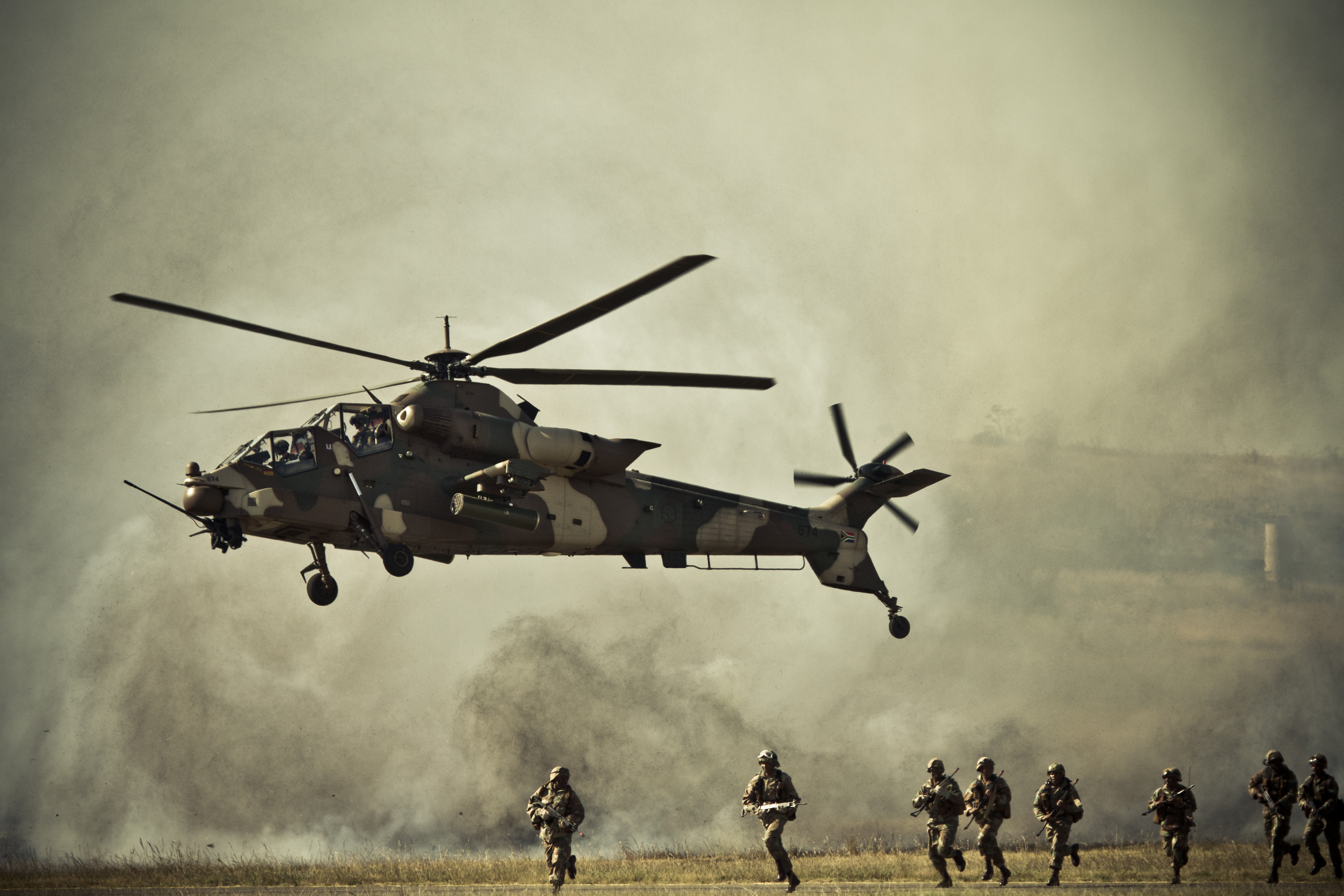
South African Army soldiers on manoeuvre with a locally developed Denel Rooivalk attack helicopter operated by the South African Air Force

The South African National Defence Force (SANDF) serves as the unified armed forces of South Africa. Established in 1994, it was formed as a voluntary military through the integration of the former South African Defence Force (SADF) and several liberation movement forces. The SANDF is organised into four branches: the South African Army, the South African Air Force, the South African Navy, and the South African Military Health Service. As of 2025, the force comprises nearly 100,000 personnel, of whom around 75,000 are active professional soldiers, and operates under the authority of the president of South Africa, who serves as commander-in-chief. The SANDF emerged as a prominent African peacekeeping force in the early 2000s, deploying as a leading contributor to United Nations and African Union missions in Burundi (2001), Sudan (2004) and the Democratic Republic of the Congo (2003). It has since participated in regional security operations in countries including Lesotho and Mozambique, while continuing to contribute to multinational United Nations peacekeeping missions, including the Force Intervention Brigade.

Supporting these armed forces is a domestic defence industry that is the most advanced in Africa and one of the world's leading defence industrial bases outside the major military powers. Coordinated by the state-owned Armaments Corporation of South Africa (Armscor), it includes major companies such as Denel, Paramount Group, and Milkor. The industry produces a wide range of advanced systems, including armoured vehicles, military aircraft, naval vessels, and missiles, with about 80% of SANDF equipment made in South Africa. The country also remains a significant arms exporter and maintains self-sufficiency in most conventional military technologies.

South Africa is the only African nation to have successfully developed nuclear weapons. Between 1980 and 1990, six operational nuclear devices were covertly assembled before the arsenal was voluntarily dismantled in 1991, making South Africa the first country to relinquish its nuclear capability. The country is also alleged to have conducted a nuclear test over the Atlantic in 1979, known as the "Vela incident", although this is officially denied; then-President F.W. de Klerk later asserted that South Africa had "never conducted a clandestine nuclear test". Despite dismantling its arsenal, South Africa still has the technical capability to restart its weapons of mass destruction programme if it ever chose to do so, as its Pelindaba Nuclear Research Centre still stores enriched uranium from the former programme. However, this material is now used primarily for civilian nuclear research and medical isotope production, reflecting South Africa's commitment to the peaceful use of nuclear energy. South Africa remains a strong advocate of nuclear disarmament, having ratified the UN Treaty on the Prohibition of Nuclear Weapons in 2019.

=== Law enforcement and crime ===
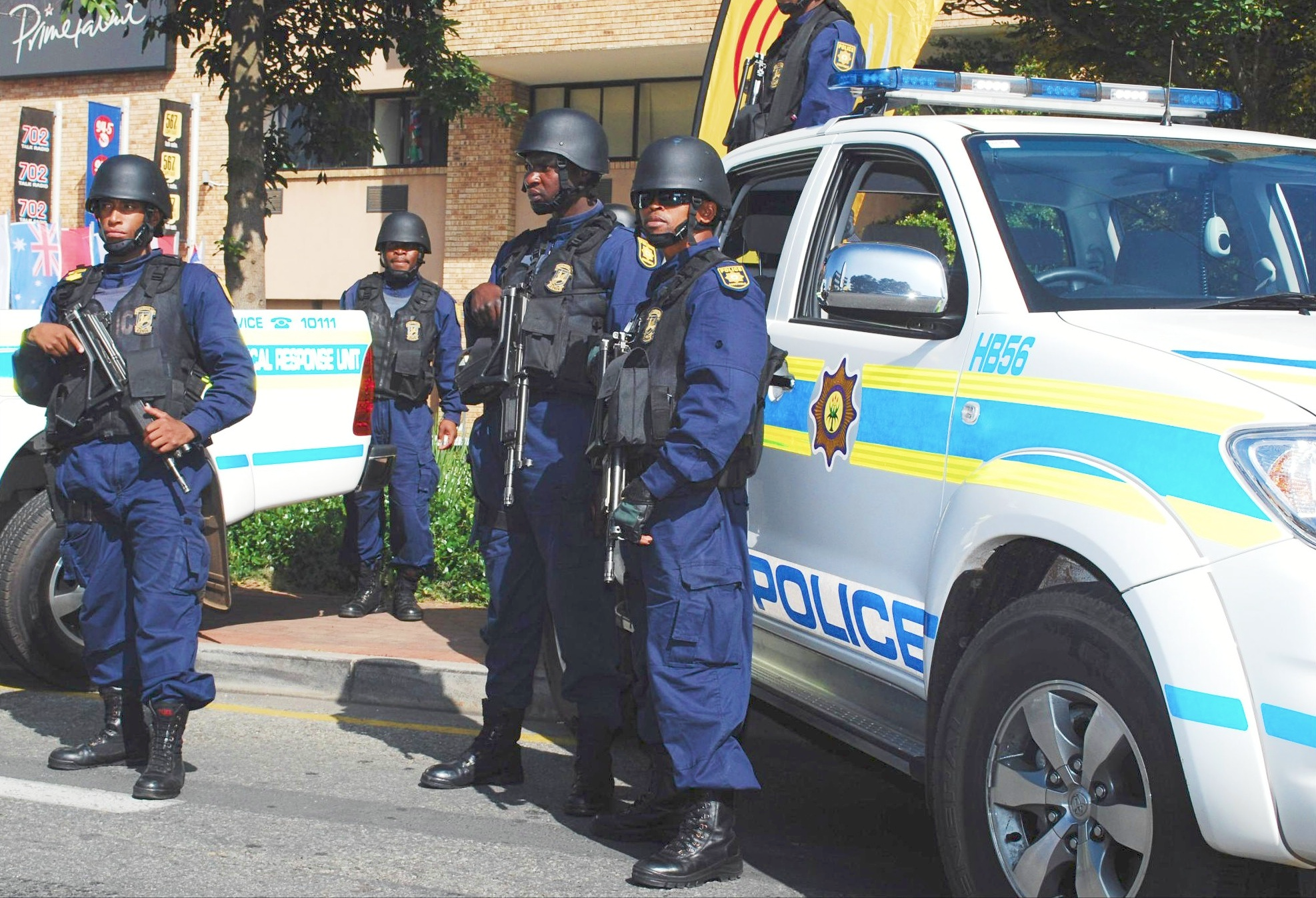
Officers of the South African Police Service with Vektor R5 rifles on parade in Johannesburg, 2010

Law enforcement in South Africa is primarily the responsibility of the South African Police Service (SAPS), the national police force operating more than 1,150 police stations and employing around 150,950 officers. The SAPS is tasked with crime prevention, investigation, and national security. It also maintains an elite tactical unit, the Special Task Force (STF), which specialises in counter-terrorism, counter-insurgency, and hostage rescue operations. In the 2023 International SWAT Competition, the STF ranked 9th out of 55 international law enforcement teams, making it the highest-ranked African police unit and one of the world's best. Alongside formal policing, South Africa has the world's largest private security industry, comprising over 10,000 companies and more than 2.5 million registered personnel, exceeding the combined size of both the police and the military.

South Africa continues to experience high levels of violent crime, among the highest in the world and it leads Africa in this regard. From April 2017 to March 2018, an average of 57 murders per day were recorded, with a homicide rate more than five times the global average. Serious crimes such as armed robbery, hijackings, cash-in-transit heists, gang-related killings, and sexual violence are common. South Africa also records one of the world's highest reported rates of rape, with tens of thousands of cases each year, though many go unreported. Between 1994 and 2019, more than 526,000 murders were reported nationwide. Gang violence remains a major driver of the homicide rate, particularly in the Cape Flats region of Cape Town, where rival groups compete over territory, drug trafficking routes, and extortion. These conflicts often result in civilian casualties, with bystanders and children frequently caught in the crossfire.

Despite ongoing reforms, South Africa's criminal justice system faces persistent challenges, including corruption, inefficiency, incompetency, and underreporting, which have undermined public confidence in law enforcement. The Department of Justice and Constitutional Development oversees the court system, while the Department of Correctional Services manages the country's prisons. South Africa has the highest prison population in Africa, with chronic overcrowding and human rights concerns frequently reported. Critics argue that systemic weaknesses and uneven access to justice have fostered a culture of impunity, sustaining high crime rates and public mistrust. These issues continue to shape national debates on security, governance, and human rights.

== Economy ==
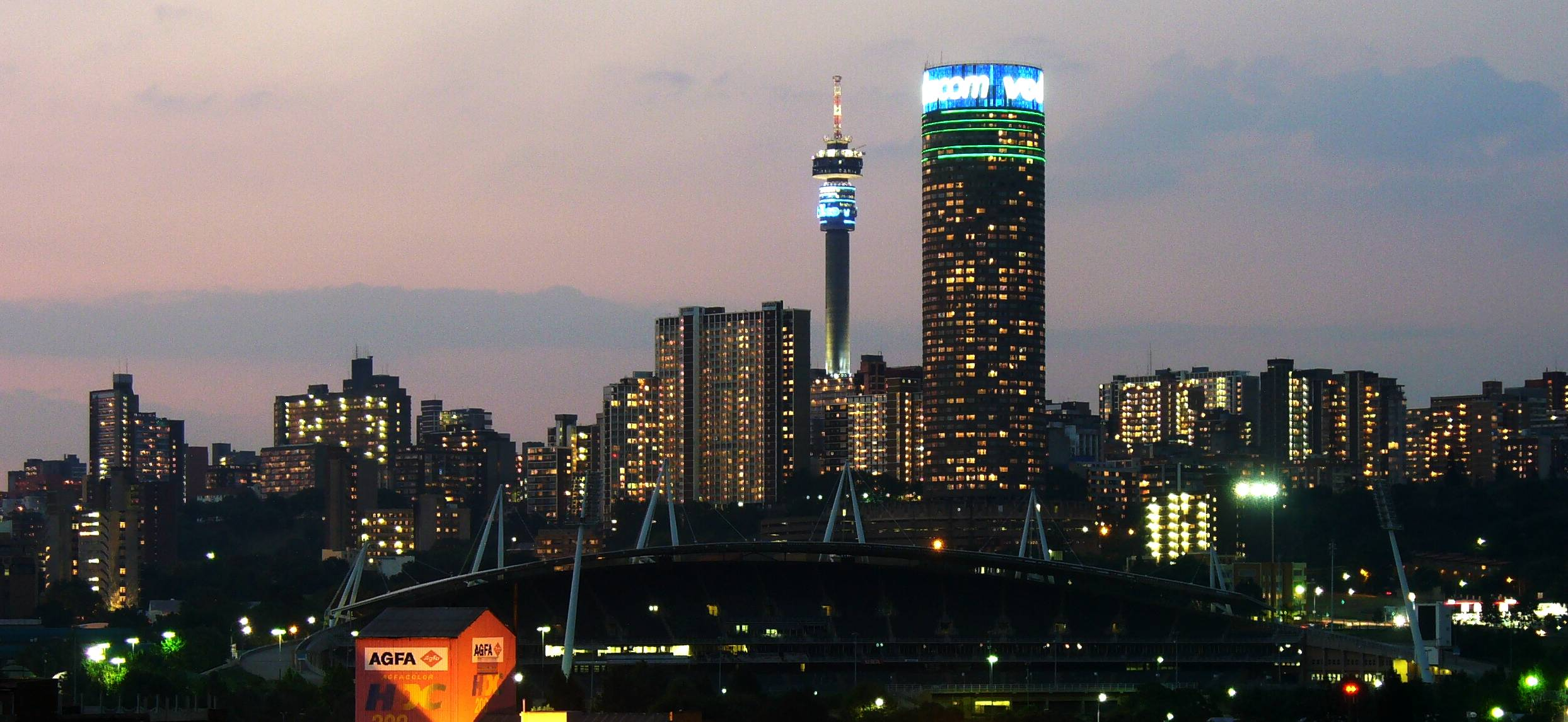
Johannesburg, the economic centre of South Africa and the continent's leading financial centre

South Africa has a mixed economy characterised by a large services sector, diversified industrial base and abundant natural resources. It is the largest economy in Africa and is widely recognised as the continent's most industrialised, technologically advanced and diversified nation. As of 2026, South Africa has a nominal gross domestic product (GDP) exceeding US$450 billion, making it the world's 39th-largest economy and one of the highest GDPs per capita in sub-Saharan Africa. The South African rand (ZAR) is Africa's most traded currency, while the Johannesburg Stock Exchange (JSE) is the continent's largest stock exchange and ranks among the world's 20 largest by market capitalization. South Africa is the only African member of the G20 and is also a member of BRICS.

In 2023, South Africa ranked 106th on the Human Development Index (HDI), placing it in the high human development category. Its labour force numbered approximately 27.8 million in 2024, the 26th-largest in the world. Despite its economic development, South Africa continues to face high unemployment, widespread poverty and severe income inequality, with an official unemployment rate of 33.6% as of the second quarter of 2026. Approximately 23 million people (37.9% of the population) live below the lower-bound poverty line, while 10.8 million live below the food poverty line, and the country consistently records one of the world's highest Gini coefficients.

South Africa is a major trading nation, ranking among the world's 50 largest exporters and importers. Its principal exports include minerals, precious metals, vehicles, machinery, agricultural products and manufactured goods. As of 2026, its largest export markets are China (12.5%), the United States (7.7%), Germany (7.4%), Japan (5.6%) and the United Kingdom (4.0%), while its principal import sources are China (22.7%), India (12.2%), Nigeria (6.8%), the United States (6.3%) and Germany (5.7%). In 2025, exports accounted for approximately 31.4% of GDP.

=== Industries and services ===
A BMW iX1 charging at a charging station in Constantia, Cape Town

South Africa is a highly industrialised country with Africa's most diversified industrial sector. Industry accounted for approximately 24% of GDP in 2024, with manufacturing contributing around 13% and ranking 40th globally by output. Major industries include construction, motor vehicles, chemicals, steel, machinery, processed foods, textiles and military hardware. The country also has shipbuilding and aerospace industries, with a significant focus on defence-related products. State-owned enterprises, including Eskom, Transnet and Denel, also play a role in the industrial economy, particularly in the energy, transport and defence sectors.

Within manufacturing, the automotive industry is a major component. Ford opened the country's first assembly plant in 1924, followed by General Motors in 1926. Other international manufacturers subsequently established assembly operations in the country, including Toyota, Volkswagen, BMW, Mercedes-Benz and Nissan. South Africa is Africa's largest motor vehicle producer, producing around 600,000 vehicles a year, with exports accounting for approximately two-thirds of local production.

Services accounted for 63.1% of South Africa's GDP in 2025 and include a well-developed financial services industry. Johannesburg is Africa's leading financial centre and home to the JSE, while South Africa's stock market capitalization reached approximately US$1.53 trillion in 2026, ranking 16th globally. Retail is also significant, with the country having the world's sixth-largest number of shopping centres. Other major services include real estate, telecommunications and business services, with Cape Town serving as a leading technology hub on the African continent.

South African companies feature prominently among Africa's most valuable businesses, including AngloGold Ashanti, Gold Fields, Impala Platinum, Naspers, MTN, Vodacom, Sanlam, Sasol, FirstRand and Standard Bank Group. Their activities span mining, finance, telecommunications, insurance, chemicals, media and technology, with many operating across Africa and internationally. In a 2026 African Business ranking, all 20 South African companies listed were among the 30 leading African companies by market value.

=== Mining ===
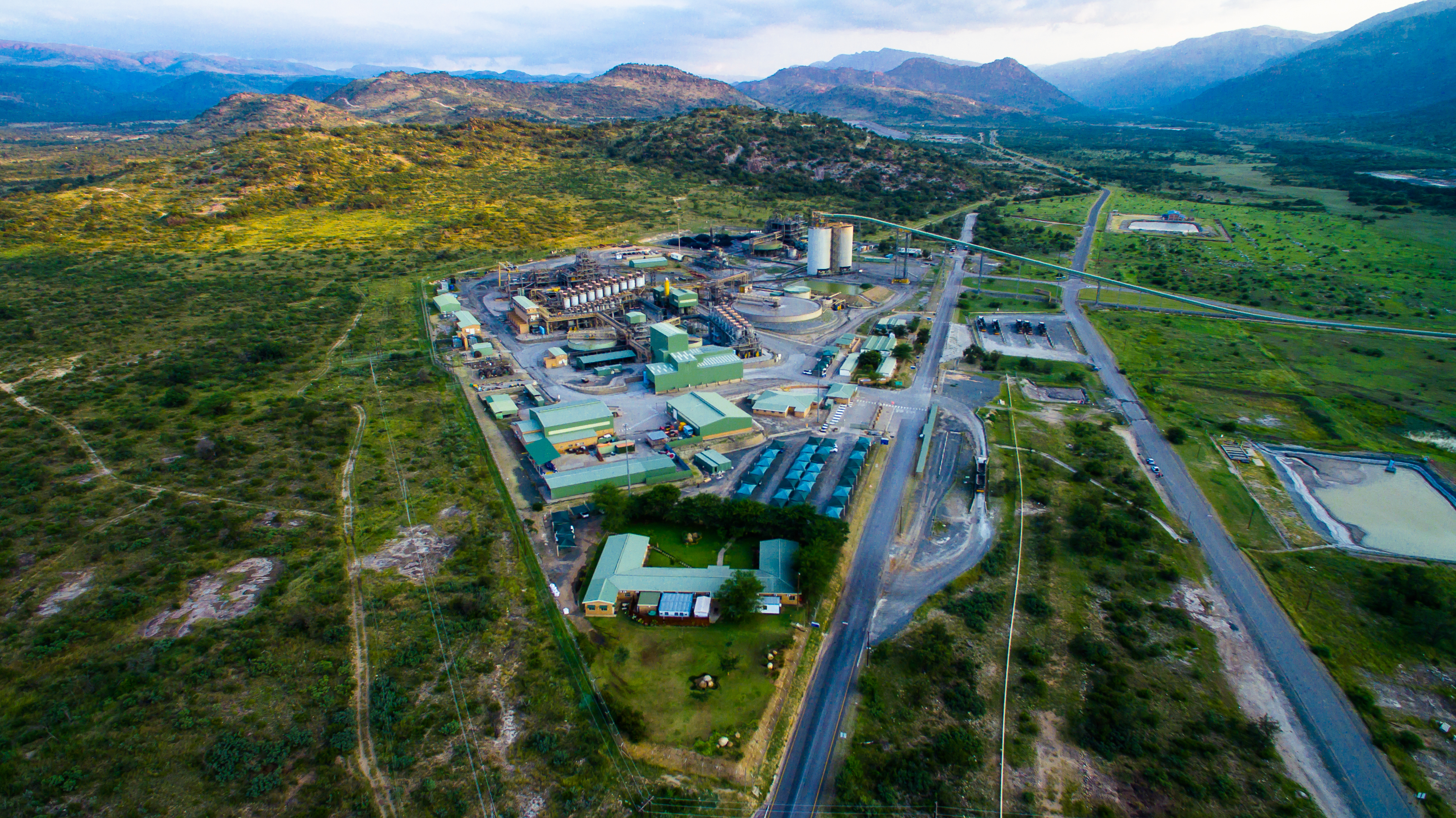
The Two Rivers mine, jointly owned by African Rainbow Minerals and Impala Platinum Holdings Limited

The mining industry remains an important part of South Africa's economy, contributing around 6.0% of GDP in 2024, making South Africa the world's fifth-largest mining economy by contribution to GDP. Mineral products accounted for around 52% of the value of the country's total exports in 2025. The industry has historically played a major role in the country's industrial development, following the discovery of diamonds near the Orange River in 1867 and gold on the Witwatersrand in 1886. The sector is regulated by the Department of Mineral and Petroleum Resources, which is responsible for the mining industry, the exploitation of mineral resources and the petroleum industry.

South Africa is one of the world's leading producers of mineral resources. In 2024, South Africa accounted for substantial shares of global mined mineral production, including platinum (70%), chromium (46%), manganese (40%), palladium (38%), vermiculite (35%), rutile and zircon (22% each), ilmenite (14%), industrial diamond (8%), vanadium (7%), industrial garnet and talc (about 5% each), fluorspar (4%), and gemstone diamond, gold and iron ore (3% each). South Africa also possesses mineral reserves valued at more than US$2.5 trillion, including substantial shares of global reserves of platinum-group metals (88%), manganese (80%), chromite (72%), vanadium (32%), zirconium (25%), fluorspar (17%), gold (13%), titanium minerals (10%), uranium (5%), and antimony (2%).

=== Agriculture ===
Sugarcane fields along the east coast north of Durban

The agricultural sector contributed approximately 2.7% to South Africa's GDP in 2025 while supporting food security, rural livelihoods and exports. It is considered the most modern, productive and diverse agricultural sector in Africa. According to the 2017 Census of Commercial Agriculture, South Africa had 40,122 commercial farming units, of which 33.9% were engaged in livestock farming, 31.1% in mixed farming and 21.3% in field crops. In September 2018, commercial agriculture covered 46.4 million hectares (114.7 million acres), or 37.9% of the country's land area. Of this land, 36.5 million hectares (78.7%) were used for grazing and 7.6 million hectares (16.4%) for arable farming, with the remainder devoted to other uses.

South Africa is a leading producer and exporter of citrus fruit, grapes, wine, apples, pears, maize, sugarcane, nuts and wool. South Africa became the world's largest citrus exporter by volume in 2025, overtaking Spain after exporting approximately 2.9 million tonnes. Its wine industry is the seventh-largest in the world. South Africa is a net exporter of agricultural products and exports approximately half of its agricultural production. It is also the world's largest producer of mohair and ostrich meat.

=== Science and technology ===
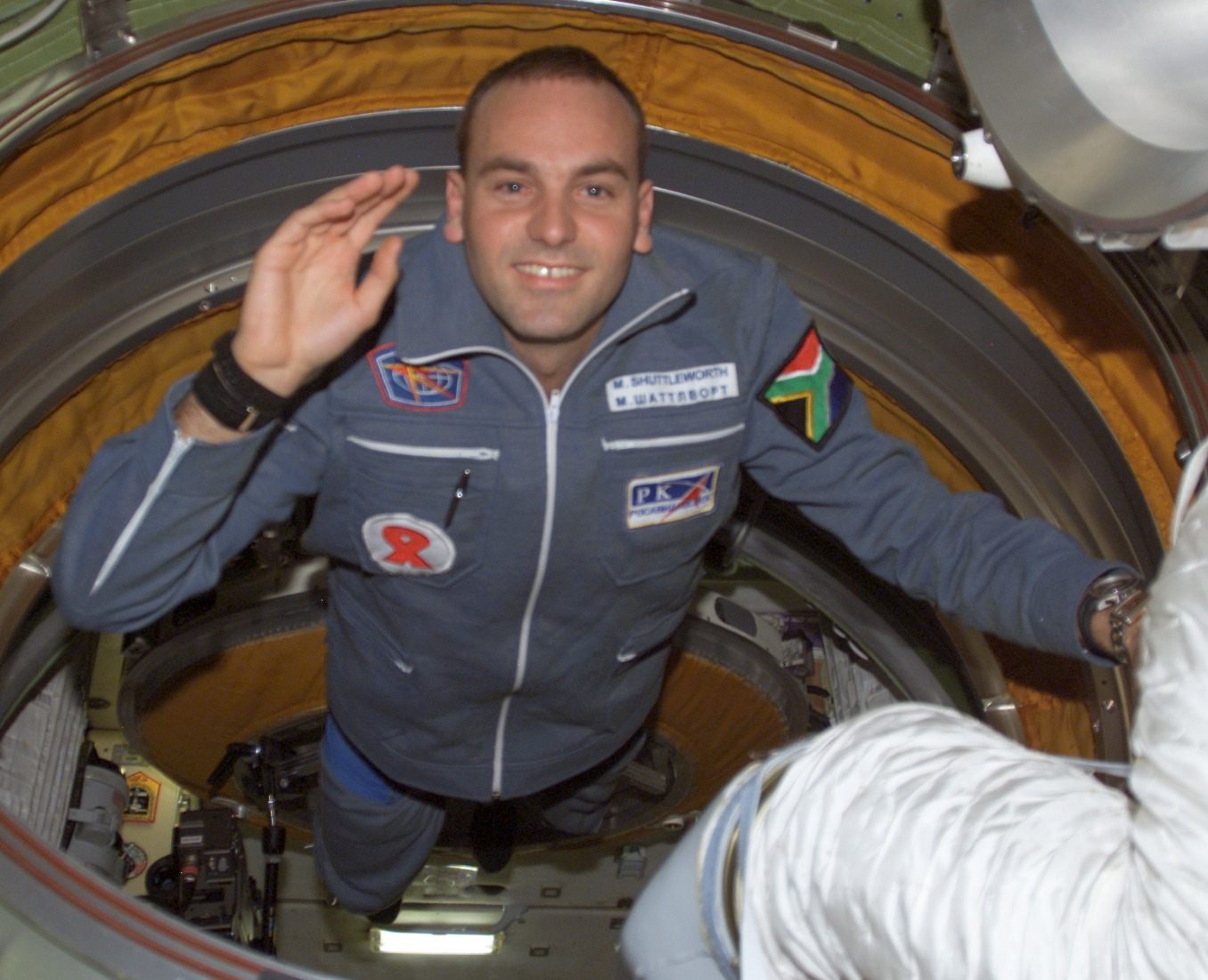
Mark Shuttleworth in space

Several important scientific and technological developments have originated in South Africa. The first human-to-human heart transplant was performed by cardiac surgeon Christiaan Barnard at Groote Schuur Hospital in December 1967; Max Theiler developed a vaccine against yellow fever, Allan MacLeod Cormack pioneered X-ray computed tomography (CT scan); and Aaron Klug developed crystallographic electron microscopy techniques. Cormack and Klug received Nobel Prizes for their work. Sydney Brenner won in 2002, for his pioneering work in molecular biology. Mark Shuttleworth founded Thawte, an early Internet security company pioneering digital certificates and online security. South Africa was ranked 61st in the Global Innovation Index in 2025, reflecting its continued scientific and technological capabilities.

South Africa has a burgeoning astronomy community and hosts the Southern African Large Telescope, the largest optical telescope in the Southern Hemisphere, and the MeerKAT radio telescope, a precursor to the €1.5 billion Square Kilometre Array project. The South African National Space Agency (SANSA), established in 2010, oversees the country's space activities. South Africa launched its first locally developed satellite, SUNSAT, in 1999 and had Africa's second-highest number of satellites in space, with 13 as of 2025, behind Egypt with 14. South Africa is also the continent's leading satellite developer, with a high proportion of satellite components and systems developed locally.

South Africa has also made significant contributions to military technology. The country pioneered mine-resistant vehicle designs, including the Buffel and Casspir, which established the use of V-shaped hulls to protect occupants from landmines and later influenced modern MRAP vehicles. South Africa also pioneered the operational use of helmet-mounted sight technology on combat aircraft, successfully integrating a locally developed system with air-to-air missiles on Mirage fighters in 1975.

=== Tourism ===
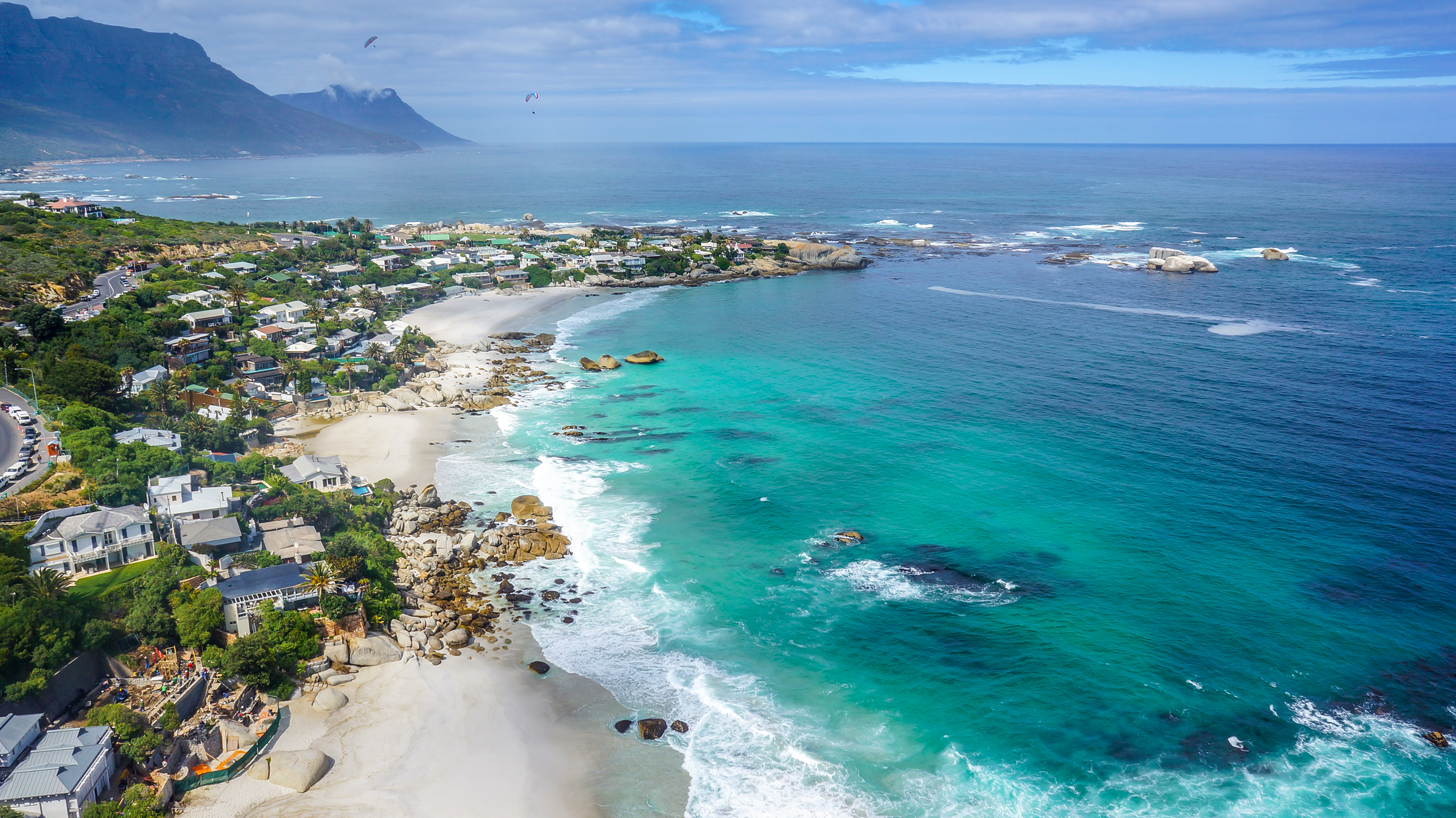
Clifton Beach in Cape Town is one of South Africa's most famous beaches

South Africa is a major international tourist destination, known for its diverse landscapes, wildlife and cultural heritage. In 2024, it welcomed approximately 8.9 million international visitors through its various ports of entry. In 2025, The Daily Telegraph ranked it the fourth-best country to visit worldwide and the highest-rated destination in Africa and the Indian Ocean region. Tourism accounted for around 5.8% of South Africa's GDP in 2024.

Tourist attractions include Kruger National Park, Table Mountain, the Garden Route, the Drakensberg and the beaches of the Western Cape and KwaZulu-Natal. Safari tourism is a major attraction, supported by national parks and private game reserves.

Major cities also attract tourists. Cape Town is known for Table Mountain, the V&A Waterfront and the nearby Cape Winelands; Johannesburg for attractions such as the Apartheid Museum, Constitution Hill and Gold Reef City; and Durban for its beaches and Golden Mile. Wine tourism is also popular in the vineyards of Stellenbosch, Franschhoek and Paarl.

South Africa also has twelve UNESCO World Heritage Sites, including Robben Island, the Cradle of Humankind, iSimangaliso Wetland Park and the Cape Floral Region Protected Areas.

== Infrastructure ==
=== Transport ===
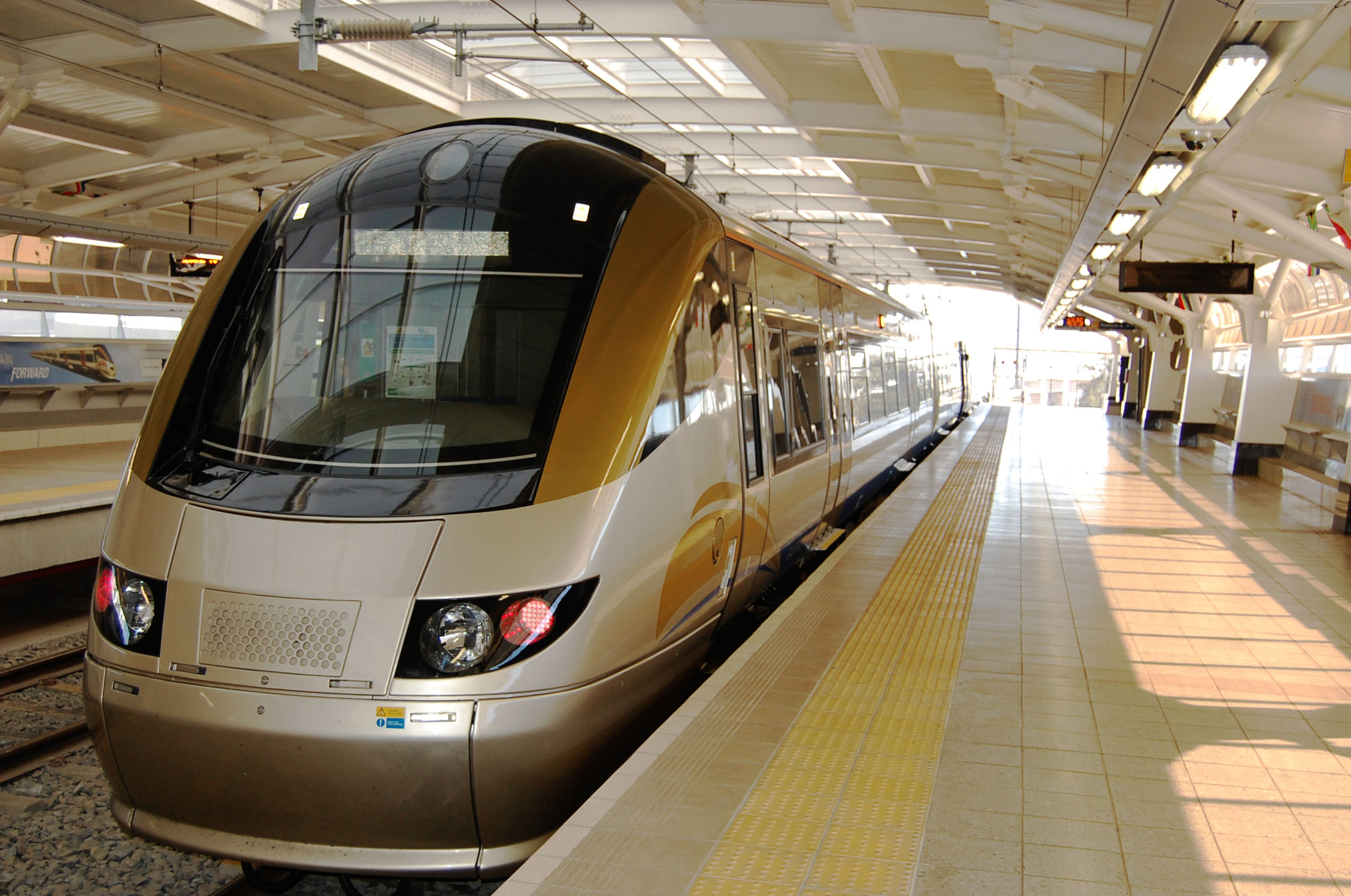
A Gautrain higher-speed express commuter rail at O. R. Tambo International Airport, Johannesburg

South Africa has the largest and most extensive transport infrastructure in Africa, comprising an integrated network of roads, railways, airports, seaports and pipelines. The country has approximately 750,000 kilometres (470,000 mi) of roads, making it the largest road network in Africa and the 12th-largest in the world. The South African National Roads Agency (SANRAL) manages the national road system, including major highways such as the N1, N2, N3 and N4, which connect the country's principal cities and form part of transcontinental routes such as the Cape to Cairo Highway.

The railway network extends approximately 36,000 kilometres (23,700 mi), making it the largest in Africa and the seventh-largest in the world. Freight services are operated primarily by Transnet Freight Rail, while commuter rail services are provided by the Passenger Rail Agency of South Africa (PRASA). The Gautrain rapid rail system links Johannesburg and Pretoria, providing the country's only higher-speed rail service.

South Africa has more than 1,500 airports, among the highest numbers in the world and the greatest of any African country. O.R. Tambo International Airport in Johannesburg is the largest and busiest airport in Africa, serving as the country's principal international gateway, while Cape Town International, King Shaka International and Chief Dawid Stuurman International airports are other major hubs. South Africa also has the continent's largest and most developed aviation market, served by airlines including South African Airways, Airlink, FlySafair, CemAir and LIFT.

South Africa's maritime sector is centred on the commercial ports of Durban, Cape Town, Gqeberha, Richards Bay, Saldanha Bay and East London. The Port of Durban is the busiest container port in sub-Saharan Africa and the fourth-largest in the Southern Hemisphere, while the Port of Richards Bay is one of the world's largest bulk export facilities. Port infrastructure is managed by the Transnet National Ports Authority, which plays a central role in supporting domestic logistics and international trade.

=== Energy ===
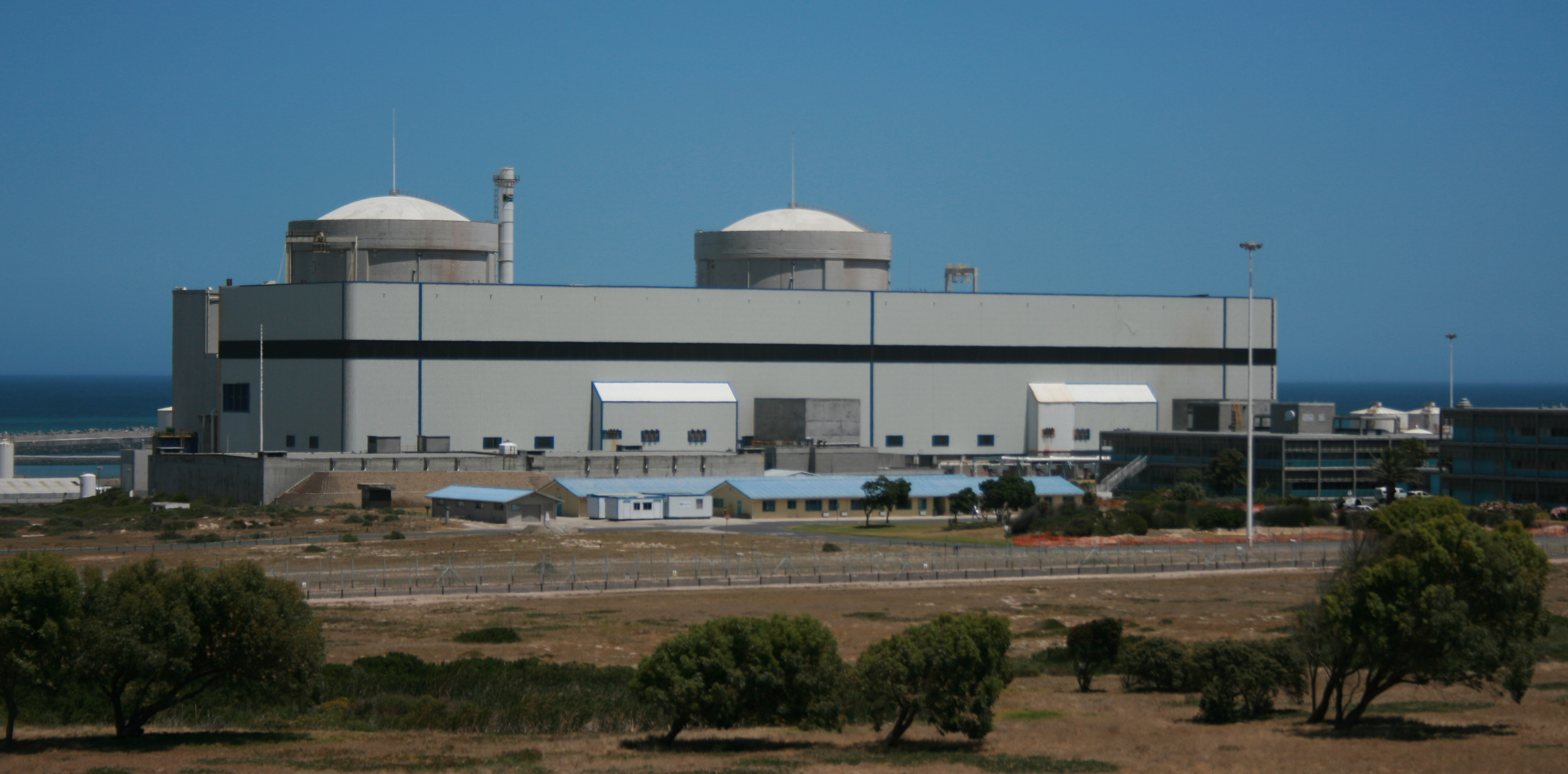
The Koeberg Nuclear Power Station in Cape Town, Africa's first and only commercial nuclear power plant

South Africa has the largest and most advanced energy sector in Africa and is the world's 22nd-largest producer of electricity. The sector is dominated by the state-owned utility Eskom, Africa's largest power company, which generates approximately 90% of the country's electricity and is a major participant in the Southern African Power Pool, the regional electricity market. South Africa remains heavily reliant on coal, producing more than 200 million tonnes annually, making it the world's seventh-largest coal producer. Around 90% of the coal consumed on the African continent is mined in South Africa, which is also one of the world's 15 largest greenhouse gas emitters.

The South African electricity grid has an installed capacity of around 60 GW. In 2024, electricity generation was sourced from coal (approximately 80–83%), renewable energy from wind, solar and hydroelectricity (9–13%), nuclear power (around 4%) and other sources, including gas, diesel and pumped storage (4–6%). Major generating facilities include the Kusile, Medupi, Majuba and Kendal coal-fired power stations, while the Koeberg Nuclear Power Station is Africa's first and only commercial nuclear power plant. Despite its substantial installed capacity, South Africa was embroiled in a prolonged energy crisis during the 2010s and early 2020s, resulting in recurring load-shedding.

Following the stabilisation of the electricity system in 2024, government policy now focuses on diversifying the electricity mix through the Integrated Resource Plan 2025, which targets 105 GW of new generation capacity by 2039 and represents an investment of approximately R2.2 trillion (US$120 billion), making it the single largest investment programme in South Africa's post-apartheid history. The plan invites independent power producers to contribute to the expansion, with the projected 2039 generation mix consisting of coal (27%), wind power (24%), grid-connected solar power (18%), rooftop solar (10%), nuclear power (5%), hydroelectricity (4%), diesel (4.5%) and other sources (7.5%), representing a substantial shift away from coal.

=== Water supply and sanitation ===
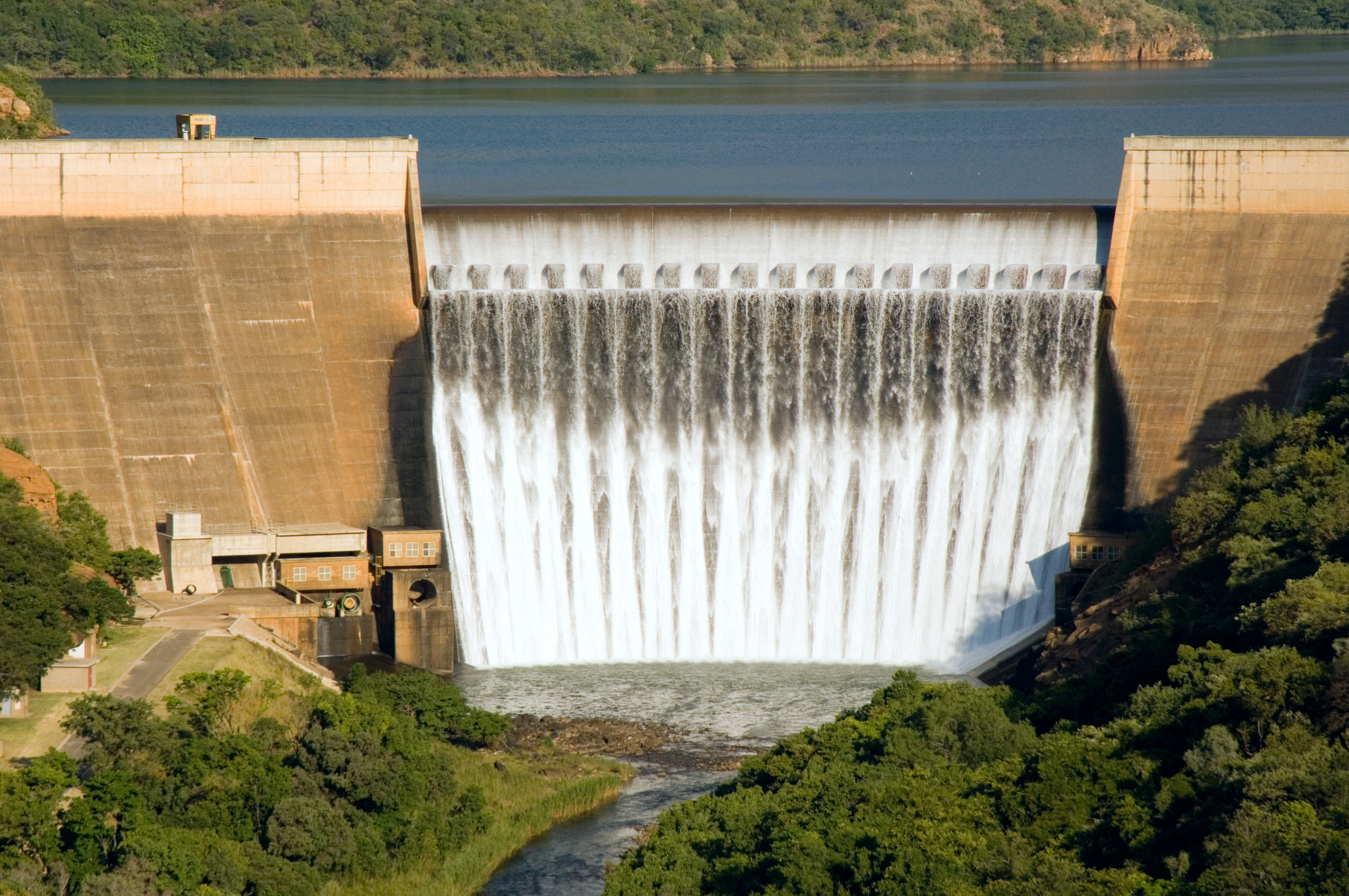
The Blyde River Dam in Mpumalanga

Two distinctive features of the South African water sector are the policy of free basic water and the existence of water boards, which are bulk water supply agencies that operate pipelines and sell water from reservoirs to municipalities. These features have led to significant problems concerning the financial sustainability of service providers, leading to a lack of attention to maintenance. Following the end of apartheid, the country had made improvements in the levels of access to water as those with access increased from 66% to 79% from 1990 to 2010. Sanitation access increased from 71% to 79% during the same period. However, water supply and sanitation has come under increasing pressure in recent years despite a commitment made by the government to improve service standards and provide investment subsidies to the water industry.

The eastern parts of South Africa suffer from periodic droughts linked to the El Niño weather phenomenon. In early 2018, Cape Town, which has different weather patterns to the rest of the country, faced a water crisis as the city's water supply was predicted to run dry before the end of June. Water-saving measures were in effect that required each citizen to use less than 50 litres (13 US gal) per day. Cape Town rejected an offer from Israel to help it build desalination plants. According to the United Nations' Sustainable Development Goal 6 data, 22% of domestic wastewater in South Africa was safely treated in 2024.

=== Telecommunications ===
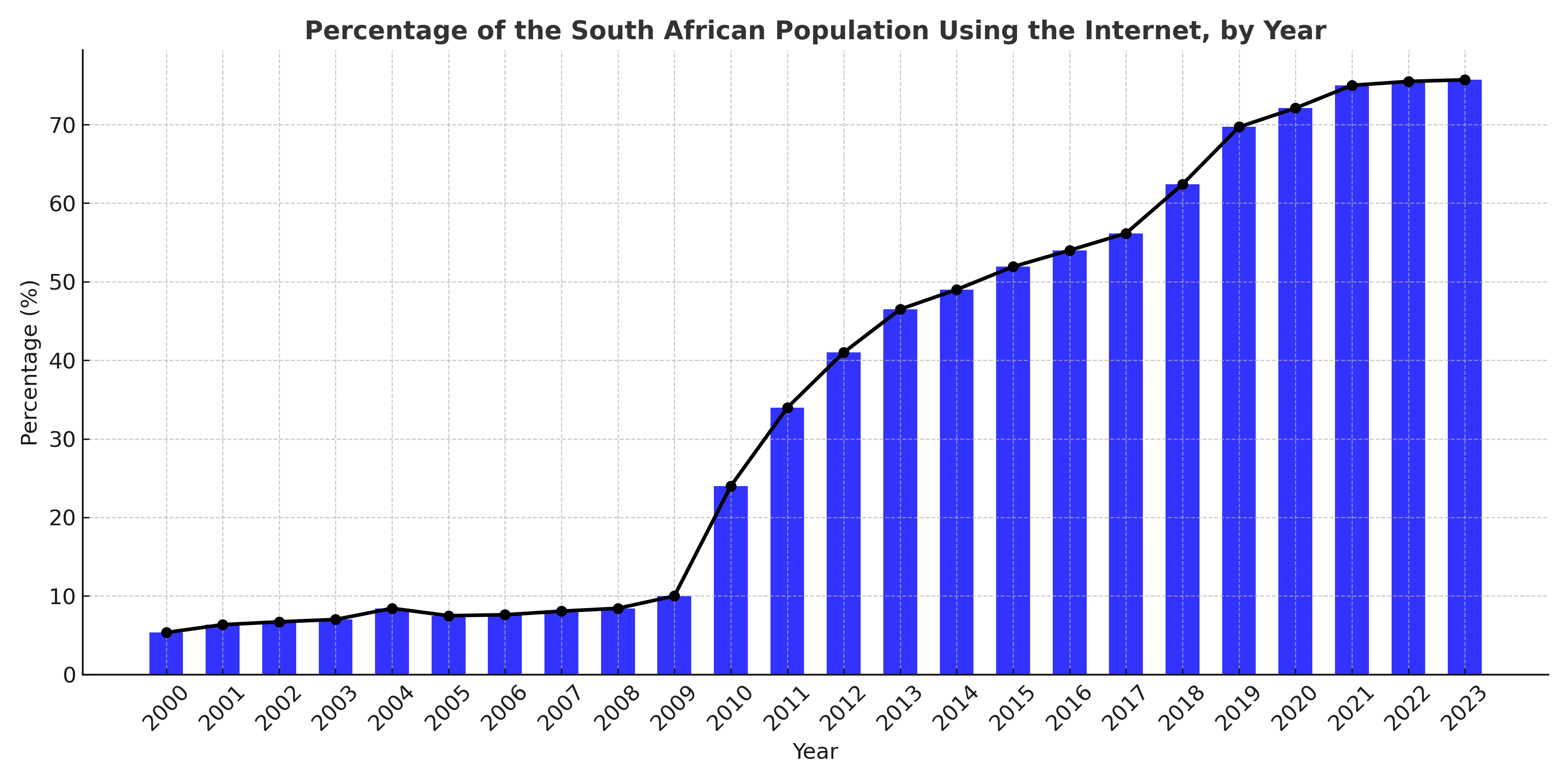
Growth in internet usage among the South African population, by year

South Africa has the most advanced telecommunications sector in Africa, regulated by the Independent Communications Authority of South Africa (ICASA). The country serves as a key regional hub for digital connectivity, supported by several major undersea cable systems such as WACS, SAT-3, Seacom, and 2Africa, which link South Africa to global networks. Mobile penetration is among the highest on the continent, and internet access continues to expand rapidly across urban and rural areas.

The mobile communications market is led by major South African operators including Vodacom, MTN, Telkom, Cell C, and Rain. MTN, in particular, stands out as Africa's largest mobile network operator and one of the top ten globally, with nearly 290 million users as of 2022. South Africa offers a full range of network technologies from 2G to 5G, with MTN, Vodacom, and Rain being the first to launch 5G services on the entire African continent. While fixed-line connections have declined, fibre-optic broadband is growing quickly through providers such as Openserve, Vumatel, Frogfoot, Octotel, and MetroFibre. Satellite internet remains available for remote regions, though Starlink has yet to launch locally due to regulatory restrictions.

== Demographics ==
Map of population density in South Africa: <1 /km^{2}; 1–3 /km^{2}; 3–10 /km^{2}; 10–30 /km^{2}; 30–100 /km^{2}; 100–300 /km^{2}; 300–1000 /km^{2}; 1000–3000 /km^{2}; >3000 /km^{2}

South Africa is a nation of about 62 million (as of 2022) people of diverse origins, cultures, languages, and religions. The last census was held in 2022, with estimates produced on an annual basis. According to the United Nations World Population Prospects, South Africa's total population was 55.3 million in 2015, compared to only 13.6 million in 1950. South Africa is home to an estimated five million illegal immigrants, including some three million Zimbabweans. A series of anti-immigrant riots occurred beginning in May 2008.

Statistics South Africa asks people to describe themselves in the census in terms of five racial population groups. The 2022 census figures for these groups were: Black African at 81%, Coloured at 8.2%, White at 7.3%, Indian or Asian at 2.7%, and Other/Unspecified at 0.5%. The first census in 1911 showed that whites made up 22% of the population; this had declined to 16% by 1980.

South Africa hosts a sizeable refugee and asylum seeker population. According to the World Refugee Survey 2008, published by the U.S. Committee for Refugees and Immigrants, this population numbered approximately 144,700 in 2007. Groups of refugees and asylum seekers numbering over 10,000 included people from Zimbabwe (48,400), the DRC (24,800), and Somalia (12,900). These populations mainly lived in Johannesburg, Pretoria, Durban, Cape Town, and Port Elizabeth.

One online database lists South Africa having more than 12,600 cities and towns.

Largest cities or towns in South Africa 2016 Community Survey, World Urbanization Prospects: The 2018 Revision
| Rank | Name | Province | Pop. |
|---|---|---|---|
| 1 | Johannesburg | Gauteng | 9,167,045 |
| 2 | Cape Town | Western Cape | 4,004,793 |
| 3 | Durban | KwaZulu-Natal | 3,661,911 |
| 4 | Pretoria | Gauteng | 2,437,000 |
| 5 | Gqeberha | Eastern Cape | 1,263,051 |
| 6 | Vereeniging | Gauteng | 957,528 |
| 7 | Soshanguve | Gauteng | 841,000 |
| 8 | East London | Eastern Cape | 810,528 |
| 9 | Bloemfontein | Free State | 759,693 |
| 10 | Pietermaritzburg | KwaZulu-Natal | 679,766 |

=== Languages ===
Map showing the dominant South African languages by area: Zulu (24.4%); Xhosa (16.0%); Afrikaans (13.5%); English (9.6%); Pedi (9.1%); Tswana (8.0%); Southern Sotho (7.6%); Tsonga (4.5%); Swazi (2.5%); Venda (2.4%); Southern Ndebele (2.1%); None dominant; Areas of little or no population

South Africa has 12 official languages: Afrikaans, Zulu, Xhosa, English, Pedi, Tswana, Southern Sotho, Tsonga, Swazi, Venda, and Southern Ndebele (in order of first language speakers), as well as South African Sign Language, which was recognised as an official language in 2023. In this regard, it is fourth only to Bolivia, India, and Zimbabwe in number. While all the languages are formally equal, some languages are spoken more than others. According to the 2022 census, the three most spoken first languages are Zulu (24.4%), Xhosa (16.6%), and Afrikaans (10.6%). Although English is recognised as the language of commerce and science, it is only the fifth most common home language, that of only 8.7% of South Africans in 2022; nevertheless, it has become the de facto lingua franca of the nation. Estimates based on the 1991 census suggest just under half of South Africans could speak English. It is the second most commonly spoken language outside of the household, after Zulu.

Other languages are spoken, or were widely used previously, including Fanagalo, Khoe, Lobedu, Nama, Northern Ndebele, and Phuthi. Many of the unofficial languages of the San and Khoekhoe peoples contain regional dialects stretching northwards into Namibia and Botswana, and elsewhere. These people, who are a physically distinct population from the Bantu people who make up most of the black Africans in South Africa, have their own cultural identity based on their hunter-gatherer societies. They have been marginalised, and the remainder of their languages are in danger of becoming extinct.

White South Africans may also speak European languages, including Italian, Portuguese (also spoken by black Angolans and Mozambicans), Dutch, German, and Greek, while some Indian South Africans and more recent migrants from South Asia speak Indian languages, such as Gujarati, Hindi, Tamil, Telugu, and Urdu. French is spoken by migrants from Francophone Africa.

=== Religion ===
Religion in South Africa (2022 census)
1. Christianity (85.3%)
2. Traditional faiths (7.80%)
3. No religion (3.10%)
4. Islam (1.60%)
5. Hinduism (1.10%)
6. Others (1.10%)

According to the 2022 census, Christians accounted for 85.3% of the population, with a majority of them being members of various Protestant denominations (broadly defined to include syncretic African-initiated churches) and a minority of Catholics and other Christians. Per the 2001 census, the Christian category included Zion Christian (11.1%), Pentecostal (Charismatic) (8.2%), Catholic (7.1%), Methodist (6.8%), Dutch Reformed (6.7%), and Anglican (3.8%). Members of the remaining Christian churches accounted for the rest of the Christian population. Per the 2022 census, Muslims accounted for 1.6% of the population, Hindus 1.1%, traditional African religions 7.8%, 3.1% had no religious affiliation, and 1.1% were "other".

African-initiated churches formed the largest of the Christian groups. It was believed that many of the persons who claimed no affiliation with any organised religion adhered to a traditional African religion. There are an estimated 200,000 traditional healers, and up to 60% of South Africans consult these healers, generally called sangoma ('diviner') or inyanga ('herbalist'). These healers use a combination of ancestral spiritual beliefs and a belief in the spiritual and medicinal properties of local fauna, flora, and funga commonly known as muti ('medicine'), to facilitate healing in clients. Many peoples have syncretic religious practices combining Christian and indigenous influences.

South African Muslims comprise mainly Coloureds and Indians. They have been joined by black or white South African converts as well as those from other parts of Africa. South African Muslims describe their faith as the fastest-growing religion of conversion in the country, with the number of black Muslims growing sixfold, from 12,000 in 1991 to 74,700 in 2004.

There is a substantial Jewish population, descended from European Jews who arrived as a minority amongst other European settlers. This population peaked in the 1970s at 118,000, though only around 75,000 remain today, the rest having emigrated, mostly to Israel. The present-day Jewish community in South Africa is the largest on the African continent, and the twelfth-largest in the world.

=== Education ===
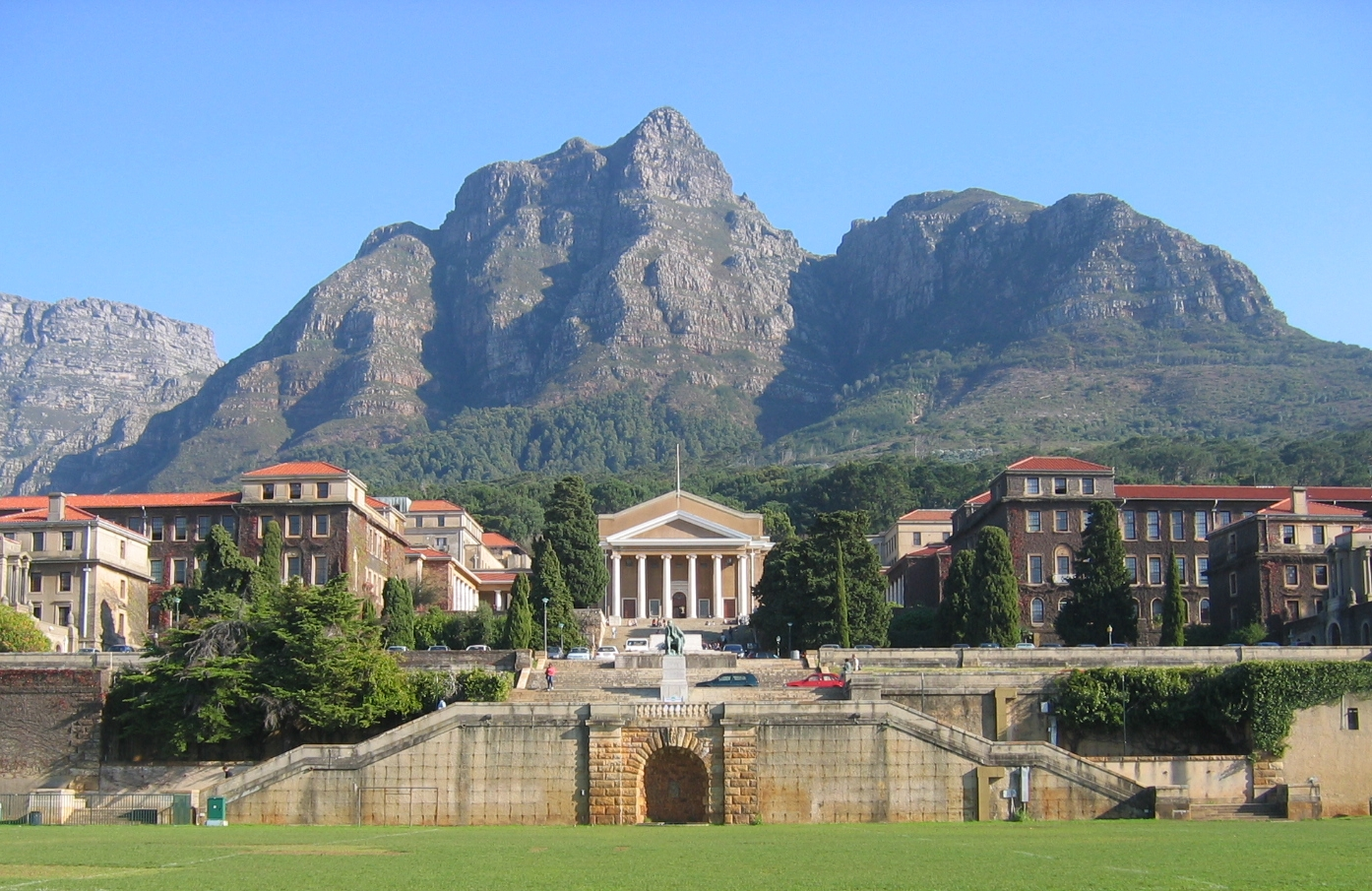
The University of Cape Town

The adult literacy rate in 2025 was 95%. This was the second-highest in Africa, behind only Seychelles. South Africa has a three-tier system of education starting with primary school, followed by high school, and tertiary education in the form of (academic) universities and universities of technology. Learners have twelve years of formal schooling, from grade 1 to 12. Grade R, or grade 0, is a pre-primary foundation year. Primary schools span the first seven years of schooling. High school education spans a further five years. The National Senior Certificate examination takes place at the end of grade 12, and is necessary for tertiary studies at a South African university. Public universities are divided into three types: traditional universities, which offer theoretically oriented university degrees; universities of technology (formerly called technikons), which offer vocationally-oriented diplomas and degrees; and comprehensive universities, which offer both types of qualification. There are 23 public universities in South Africa: 11 traditional universities, 6 universities of technology, and 6 comprehensive universities. There are also a large amount of FET (Further Education and Training) and TVET (Technical and Vocational Education and Training) colleges in South Africa.

Under apartheid, schools for black people were subject to discrimination through inadequate funding and a separate syllabus called Bantu Education which only taught skills sufficient to work as labourers.

In 2004, South Africa started reforming its tertiary education system, merging and incorporating small universities into larger institutions, and renaming all tertiary education institutions "university". By 2015, 1.4 million students in higher education have been aided by a financial aid scheme which was promulgated in 1999.

=== Health ===
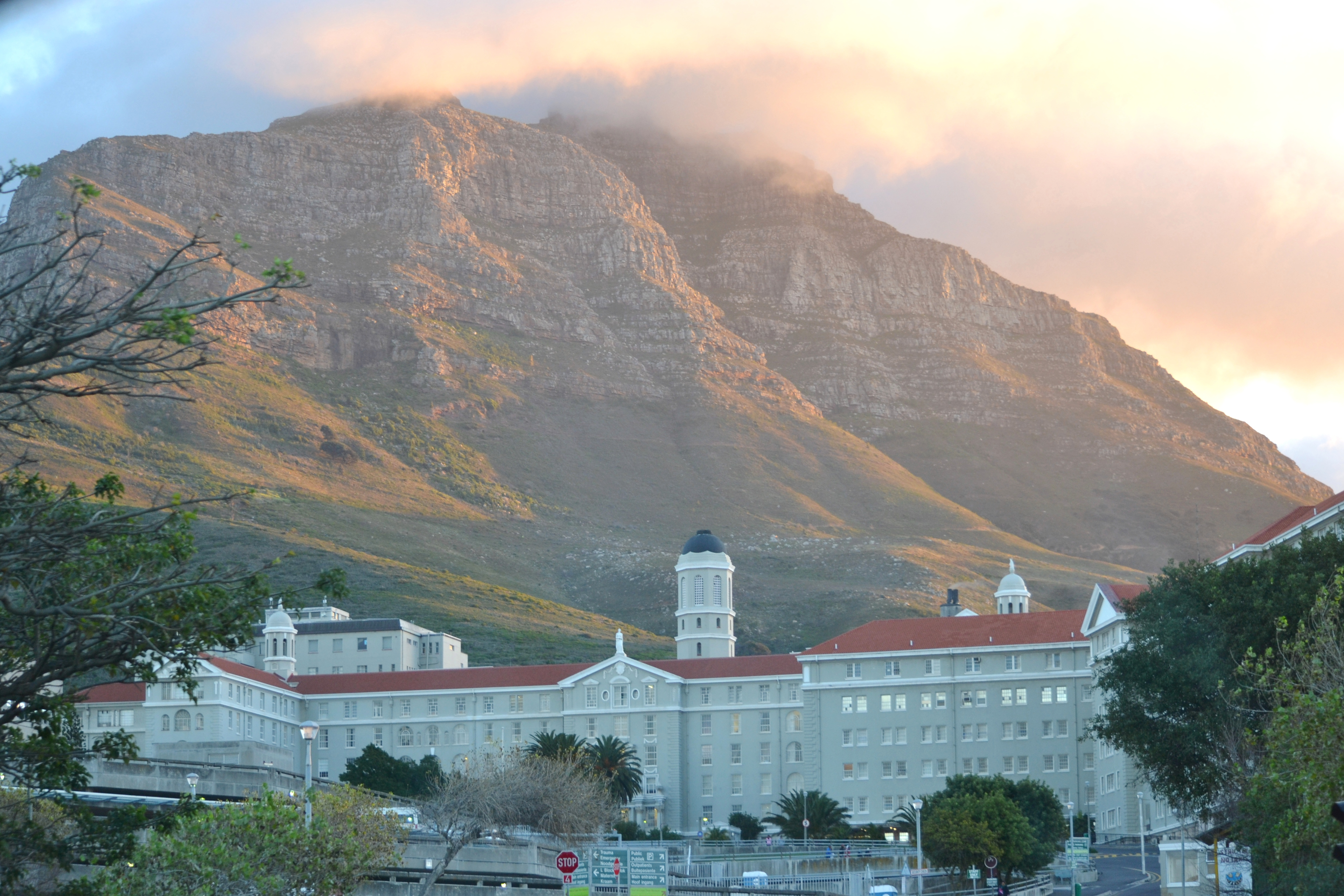
Groote Schuur Hospital in Observatory, Cape Town, site of the world's first successful human-to-human heart transplant

According to the South African Institute of Race Relations, the life expectancy in 2009 was 71 years for a white South African and 48 years for a black South African. The healthcare spending in the country is about 9% of GDP. About 84% of the population depends on the public healthcare system, which is beset with chronic human resource shortages and limited resources. About 20% of the population use private healthcare. Only 16% of the population are covered by medical aid schemes; the rest pay for private care out-of-pocket or through in-hospital-only plans. The three dominant hospital groups, Mediclinic, Life Healthcare and Netcare, together control 75% of the private hospital market. These disparities have driven ongoing policy efforts to reform the healthcare system, including the introduction of National Health Insurance (NHI) aimed at expanding equitable access to healthcare.

==== HIV/AIDS ====
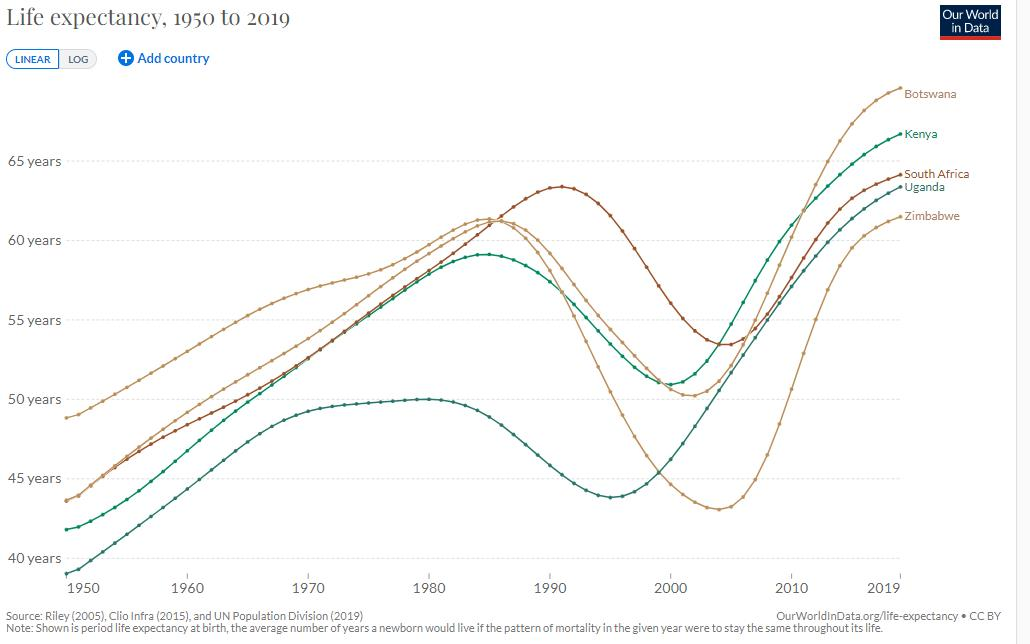
Life expectancy in select Southern African countries, 1950–2019. HIV/AIDS has caused a fall in life expectancy.

According to the 2015 UNAIDS medical report, South Africa has an estimated seven million people who are living with HIV – more than any other country in the world. In 2018, HIV prevalence—the percentage of people living with HIV—among adults (15–49 years) was 20.4%, and in the same year 71,000 people died from an AIDS-related illness.

A 2008 study revealed that HIV/AIDS infection is distinctly divided along racial lines: 13.6% of blacks are HIV-positive, whereas only 0.3% of whites have the virus. Most deaths are experienced by economically active individuals, resulting in many AIDS orphans who, in many cases, depend on the state for care and financial support. It is estimated that there are 1,200,000 orphans in South Africa.

The link between HIV, a virus spread primarily by sexual contact, and AIDS was long denied by President Thabo Mbeki and his health minister, Manto Tshabalala-Msimang, who insisted that the many deaths in the country are caused by malnutrition, and hence poverty, and not HIV. In 2007, in response to international pressure, the government made efforts to fight AIDS. After the 2009 general elections, President Jacob Zuma appointed Aaron Motsoaledi as the health minister and committed his government to increasing funding for and widening the scope of HIV treatment, and by 2015, South Africa had made significant progress, with the widespread availability of antiretroviral drugs resulted in an increase in life expectancy from 52.1 years to 62.5 years.

== Culture ==
The South African black majority still has a substantial number of rural inhabitants who lead largely impoverished lives. It is among these people that cultural traditions survive most strongly; as black people have become increasingly urbanised and Westernised, aspects of traditional culture have declined. Members of the middle class, who have historically been predominantly white but whose ranks include growing numbers of black, Coloured and Indian people, have lifestyles similar in many respects to that of people found in Western Europe, North America and Australasia.

=== Arts ===
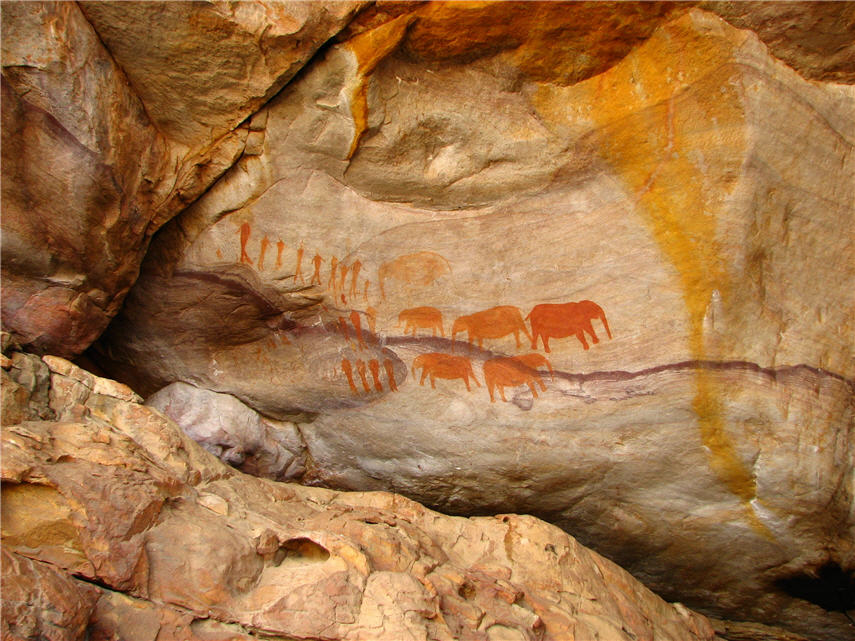
Rock painting by the San people, Cederberg

South African art includes the oldest art objects in the world, which were discovered in a South African cave and dated from roughly 75,000 years ago. The scattered tribes of the Khoisan peoples moving into South Africa from around 10,000 BC had their own fluent art styles seen today in a multitude of cave paintings. They were superseded by the Bantu/Nguni peoples with their own vocabularies of art forms. Forms of art evolved in the mines and townships: a dynamic art using everything from plastic strips to bicycle spokes. The Dutch-influenced folk art of the Afrikaner trekboers and the urban white artists, earnestly following changing European traditions from the 1850s onwards, also contributed to this eclectic mix which continues to evolve to this day.

=== Media ===
The South African media sector is large, and South Africa is one of Africa's major media centres. While the many broadcasters and publications reflect the diversity of the population as a whole, the most commonly used language is English. However, all ten other official languages are represented to some extent. South Africa's media landscape is diverse and well-developed, comprising the public broadcaster SABC, the private free-to-air channel E.tv, and satellite television provider MultiChoice, which operates DStv across sub-Saharan Africa. The country has partially rolled out digital terrestrial television (DTT), though full migration from analogue broadcasting has experienced delays.

=== Popular culture ===
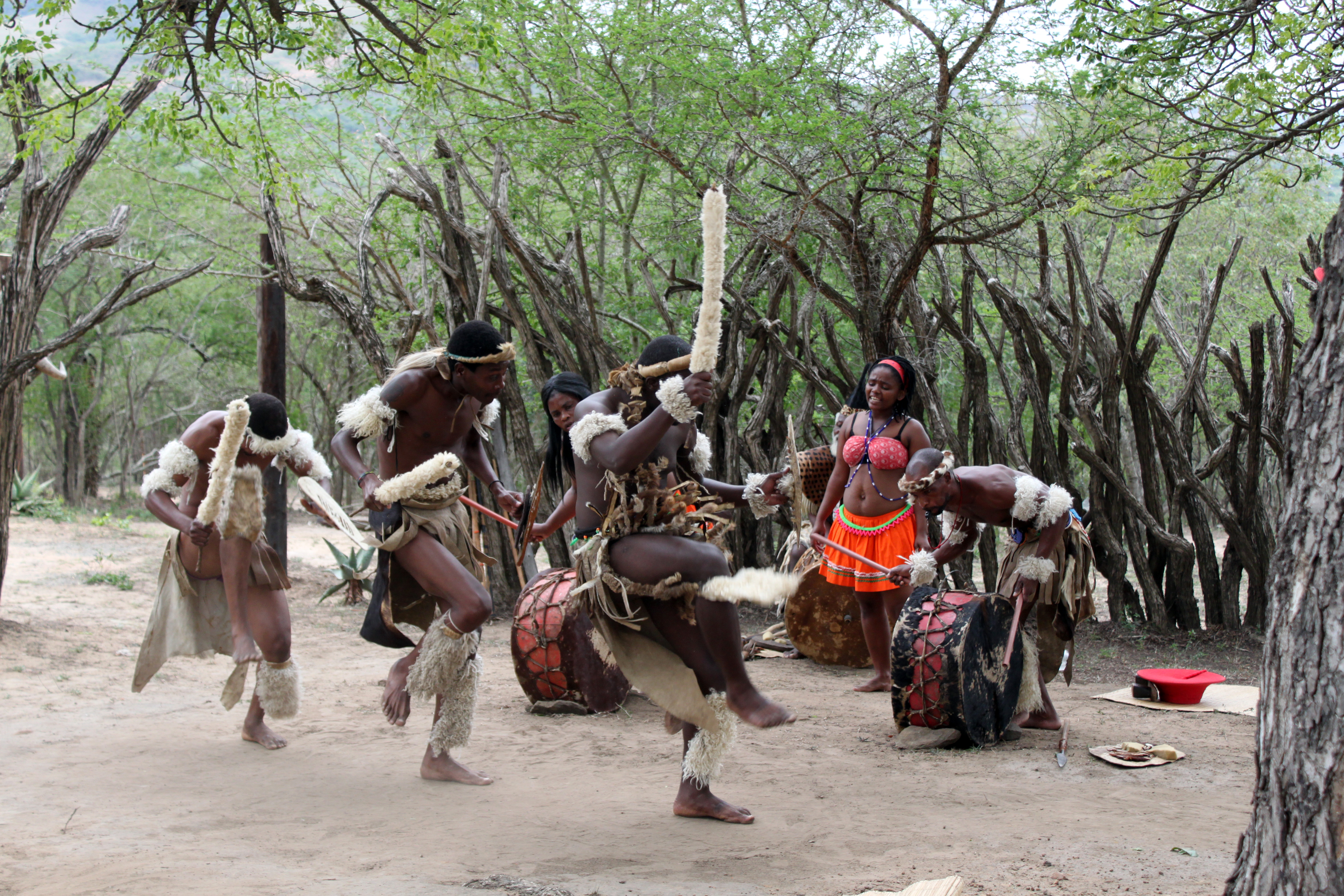
Zulus perform a traditional dance.

There is great diversity in South African music. Black musicians have developed styles called Kwaito and Amapiano. Of note is Brenda Fassie, who launched to fame with her song "Weekend Special", which was sung in English. More famous traditional musicians include Ladysmith Black Mambazo, while the Soweto String Quartet performs classical music with an African flavour. South Africa has produced world-famous jazz musicians, notably Hugh Masekela, Jonas Gwangwa, Abdullah Ibrahim, Miriam Makeba, Jonathan Butler, Chris McGregor, and Sathima Bea Benjamin.

Afrikaans music covers multiple genres, such as the contemporary Steve Hofmeyr, the punk rock band Fokofpolisiekar, and the singer-songwriter Jeremy Loops. South African popular musicians that have found international success include Manfred Mann, Johnny Clegg, rap-rave duo Die Antwoord, Tyla, and rock band Seether. Rappers such as AKA, Nasty C and Cassper Nyovest gained notoriety in other avenues like the BET Awards for best African acts.

Although few South African film productions are known outside South Africa, many foreign films have been produced about South Africa. Arguably, the most high-profile film portraying South Africa in recent years was District 9, as well as Chappie. Other notable exceptions are the film Tsotsi, which won the Academy Award for Foreign Language Film at the 78th Academy Awards in 2006, as well as U-Carmen e-Khayelitsha, which won the Golden Bear at the 2005 Berlin International Film Festival. In 2015, the Oliver Hermanus film The Endless River became the first South African film selected for the Venice Film Festival.

=== Literature ===
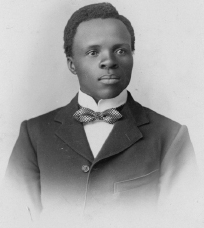
Sol Plaatje

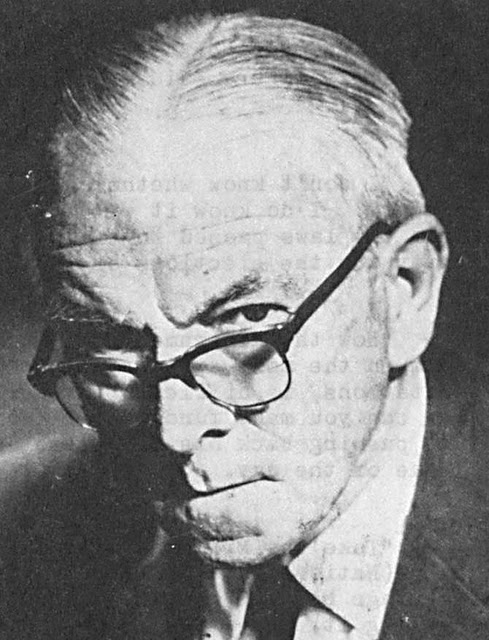
Alan Paton

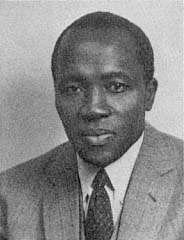
Archibald Campbell Jordan

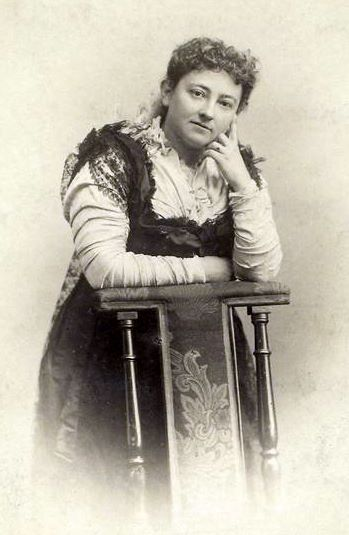
Oliver Schreiner

South African literature emerged from a unique social and political history. It "embraces all the languages and cultures of the people of South Africa" and began as an oral tradition. South Africa has 11 official spoken languages: Sepedi, Sesotho, Setswana, siSwati, Tshivenda, Xitsonga, Afrikaans, English, isiNdebele, isiXhosa and isiZulu.

==== Literature in English ====
Notable white South African authors include anti-apartheid activist Alan Paton, who published the novel Cry, the Beloved Country in 1948. Nadine Gordimer became the first South African to be awarded the Nobel Prize in Literature, in 1991. J.M. Coetzee won the Nobel Prize in Literature in 2003. When awarding the prize, the Swedish Academy stated that Coetzee "in innumerable guises portrays the surprising involvement of the outsider."

Antjie Krog is a poet, journalist, academic and writer noted for confronting apartheid and its aftermath in her work. She reported on the Truth and Reconciliation Commission for the South African Broadcasting Corporation, and her best-known book is Country of My Skull (1998). Elsa Joubert was an Afrikaans novelist, travel-writer and journalist whose work draws on African landscapes and human experiences. She is best known for the 1979 novel Die swerfjare van Poppie Nongena (The Long Journey of Poppie Nongena), a story of a black South African woman's endurance under apartheid, translated into many languages and widely celebrated.

One of the first well-known novels written by a black author in an African language was Solomon Thekiso Plaatje's Mhudi, written in 1930. During the 1950s, Drum magazine became a hotbed of political satire, fiction, and essays, giving a voice to the urban black culture.

The plays of Athol Fugard have been regularly premiered in fringe theatres in South Africa, London (Royal Court Theatre) and New York. Olive Schreiner's The Story of an African Farm (1883) was a revelation in Victorian literature; it has become recognised as one of the first feminist novels.

Breyten Breytenbach was jailed for his involvement with the guerrilla movement against apartheid. André Brink was the first Afrikaner writer to be banned by the government after he released the novel A Dry White Season.

=== Cuisine ===
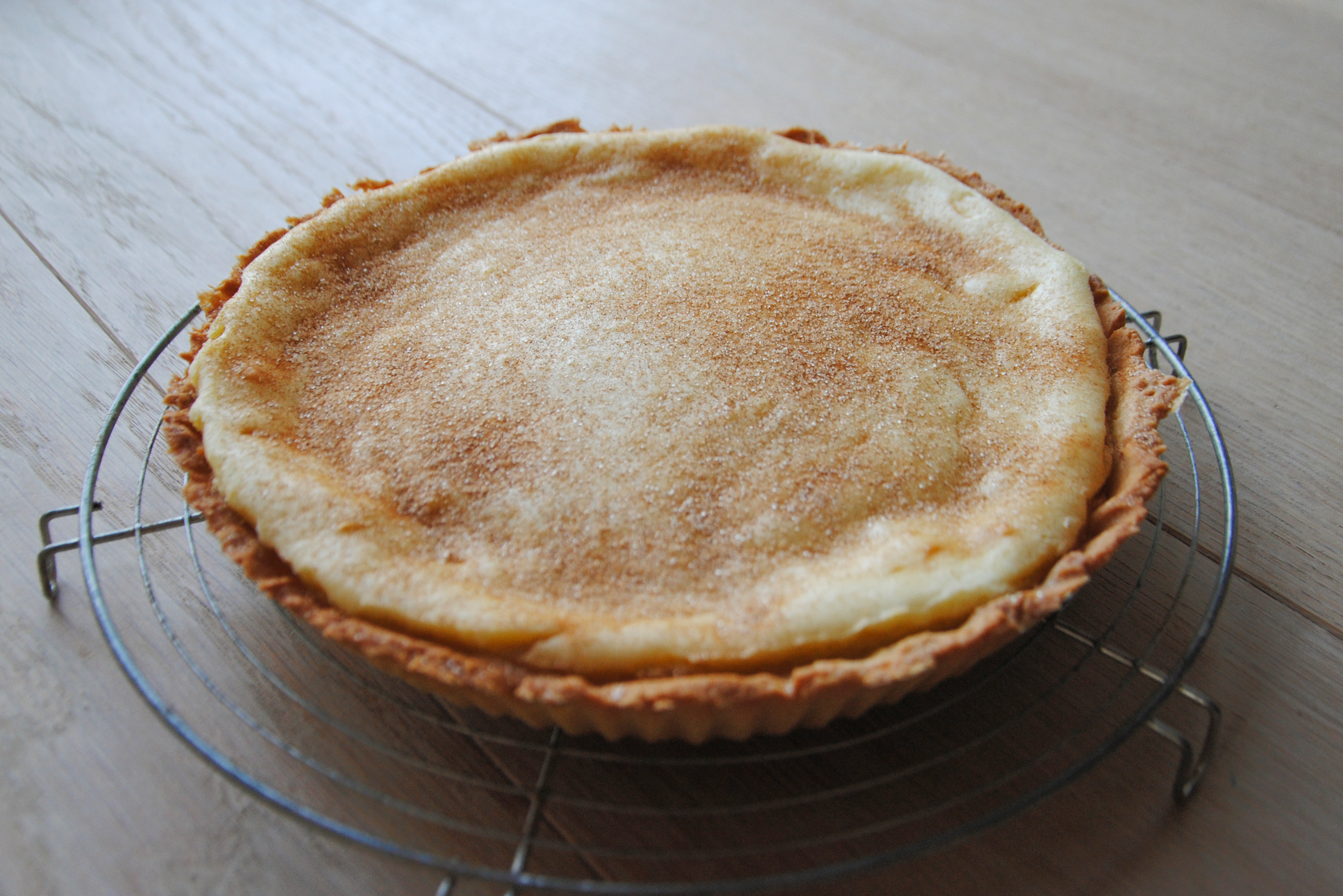
Milk tart, a traditional South African dessert made with a creamy custard filling

South African cuisine is diverse and reflects the country's multicultural heritage, incorporating influences from indigenous African, Dutch, British, Indian and Cape Malay culinary traditions. Meat plays a central role in many regional food cultures, most notably through the braai, an originally Afrikaner variation of the barbecue that functions as both a cooking method and a widely shared social custom across communities. Common braai staples include boerewors (spiced sausage), lamb chops, steak, pap (maize porridge) and chakalaka (spicy relish). Traditional dishes also vary by region and heritage, including bobotie, a curried minced meat dish with an egg-based topping; bunny chow, a hollowed-out loaf of bread filled with curry originating in Durban; and potjiekos, a slow-cooked stew prepared in a cast-iron pot over an open flame. Street foods such as vetkoek, gatsby sandwiches, samoosas and biltong (air-dried cured meat) are widely consumed, while popular desserts such as milk tart and koeksisters reflect the country's layered culinary traditions.

South Africa also has a highly developed fast-food culture, with several locally founded chains achieving national and international prominence. The most notable is Nando's, founded in Johannesburg in 1987, which specialises in flame-grilled peri-peri chicken and operates more than 1,250 outlets in over 23 countries. Other major South African fast-food franchises include Wimpy, Steers, Debonairs Pizza and Chicken Licken, many of which have expanded throughout Africa and other regions. International fast-food brands are also well established in South Africa; the country is among the world's leading markets for KFC outlets, reflecting the widespread popularity of fast food across income groups and urban centres.

In the beverage sector, South Africa has played an influential role in both global energy drinks and wine. Monster Energy, although marketed as an American brand, was founded by South African-born entrepreneurs Rodney Sacks and Hilton Schlosberg, who relocated to the United States and played a central role in the company's international expansion. South African wine is also renowned internationally, with vineyards in regions such as Stellenbosch, Franschhoek, Paarl and Barrydale. These wine-producing areas form a significant part of the country's culinary tourism industry, contributing to South Africa's international reputation for food and drink.

=== Sports ===
Cape Town Stadium is the 5th-largest stadium in South Africa, with a capacity of 55,000.

Sport plays a significant role in South African culture, and the country's most popular sports are soccer, rugby union and cricket. Other sports with notable support are swimming, athletics, golf, boxing, mixed martial arts, tennis, ringball, field hockey, surfing and netball.

Soccer is the most popular sport in South Africa. South Africa hosted the 2010 FIFA World Cup. It hosted the 1996 African Cup of Nations, with the national team Bafana Bafana going on to win the tournament. South Africa's men's U-20 team also won the 2025 U-20 Africa Cup of Nations. In 2022, the women's team also won the Women's Africa Cup of Nations, beating Morocco 2–1 in the final. The women's team went on to reach the last 16 at the 2023 FIFA Women's World Cup, beating Italy and tying with Argentina in the group stage. In 2025, South Africa qualified for the 2026 World Cup (their 1st appearance in 16 years after hosting & 24 years since they last qualified via merit-2002) and reached the Round of 32, after losing to Mexico, tying with Czechia and beating South Korea in the group stage.

Famous combat sport personalities include Baby Jake Jacob Matlala, Vuyani Bungu, Welcome Ncita, Dingaan Thobela, Corrie Sanders, Gerrie Coetzee, Brian Mitchell, Garreth McLellan and former UFC Middleweight Champion Dricus du Plessis. Durban surfer Jordy Smith won the 2010 Billabong J-Bay Open making him the highest ranked surfer in the world. South Africa produced Formula One motor racing's 1979 world champion Jody Scheckter. Famous active Grand Prix motorcycle racing personalities include Brad Binder and his younger brother Darryn Binder.

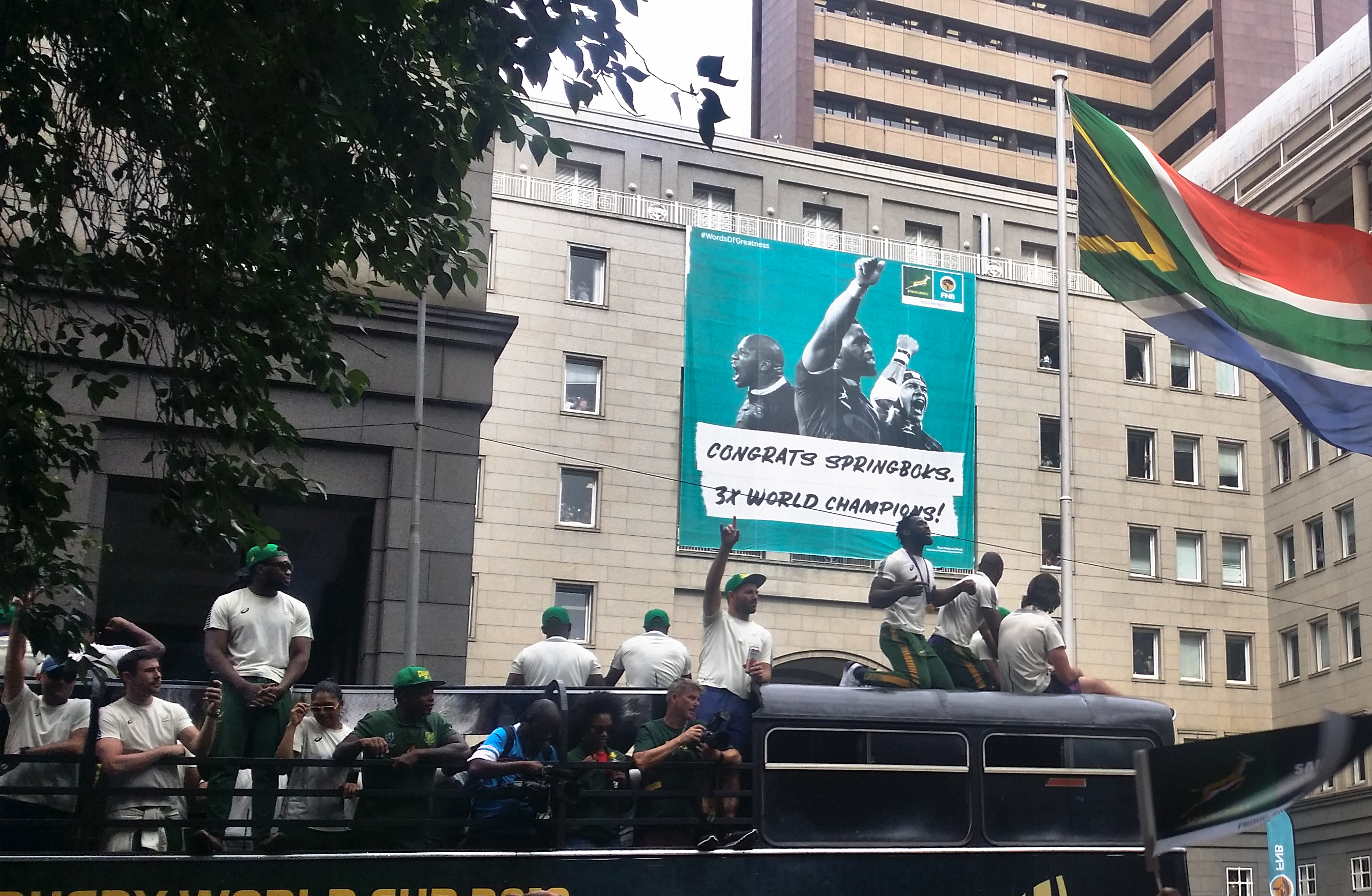
The Springboks on their tour of the country after winning the 2019 Rugby World Cup

South Africa has won the Rugby World Cup four times, the most wins of any country. South Africa first won the 1995 Rugby World Cup, which it hosted. They went on to win the tournament again in 2007, 2019 and 2023.

Cricket is one of the most played sports in South Africa. It has hosted the 2003 Cricket World Cup, the 2007 World Twenty20 Championship. South Africa's national cricket team, the Proteas, have also won the inaugural edition of the 1998 ICC KnockOut Trophy by defeating West Indies in the final. The 2023 ICC Women's T20 World Cup was hosted in South Africa and the women's team won silver. The men's team won silver at the 2024 ICC T20 World Cup, and won the 2023–2025 ICC World Test Championship, beating Australia in the final. South Africa's national blind cricket team also went on to win the inaugural edition of the Blind Cricket World Cup in 1998.

In 2004, the swimming team of Roland Schoeman, Lyndon Ferns, Darian Townsend and Ryk Neethling won the gold medal at the Olympic Games in Athens, simultaneously breaking the world record in the 4×100 Freestyle Relay. Penny Heyns won Olympic Gold in the 1996 Atlanta Olympic Games, and more recently, swimmers Tatjana Smith (née Schoenmaker), Lara van Niekerk, Akani Simbine and Wayde van Niekerk have all broken records and won medals at both the Olympic and Commonwealth Games, with Wayde van Niekerk being the world record holder in 400 metres since 2016. In 2012, Oscar Pistorius became the first double amputee sprinter to compete at the Olympic Games in London. Gary Player is regarded as one of the greatest golfers of all time, having won the Career Grand Slam, one of five to have done so.

== See also ==
- Timeline of South Africa
- Outline of South Africa
