= Johannes August Winter =

German missionary (1847–1921)

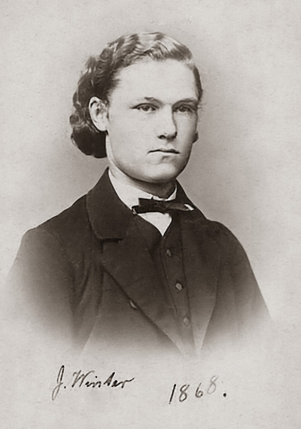
- Winter in 1868
- Born: 17 December 1847; Pniel, Orange Free State
- Died: 7 April 1921 (aged 73); Mecklenburg, South Africa
- Occupation: Missionary
- Spouse(s): Elisabeth Wangemann, daughter of Theodor Wangemann
- Children: 5

Johannes August Winter (17 December 1847 – 7 April 1921) was a German Lutheran missionary for the Berlin Missionary Society (BMS) who played an important role in the formation of the Lutheran Bapedi Church in South Africa at the turn of the 19th century, against a backdrop of competing political and economic power struggles between British, Afrikaner and native tribal interests.

== Early life ==
Johannes's father, the Reverend August Wilhelm Winter, and mother, Anna Schüttge (also from a missionary family in Lusatia), came from Berlin to Bethany, Free State in 1839 to assist fellow missionary Carl Wuras. In 1847, August established a new BMS mission at Pniel in the Orange Free State, where Johannes and his siblings were born. The family went back to Germany in 1851 due to August's ill health, but the children all returned to South Africa after receiving their education in Germany.

=== Education ===
After successfully completing his schooling in Germany, Winter was admitted to the Berlin Missionary Society's seminary on the recommendation of inspector Eduard Kratzenstein. He excelled academically and was admitted to a fully funded degree in theology at the University of Berlin, on the recommendation of the dean of the faculty, Isaak Dorner.

== Early career at Botshabelo ==
In 1872, Winter returned to South Africa to commence his career at the Botshabelo mission station in the district of Middelburg in the then ZAR, originally established in 1865 by another BMS missionary, Alexander Merensky, father of the well-known South African geologist, Hans Merensky. In 1878, he became the head of the national helpers' (Nationalhelferen) seminary at Botshabelo.

=== Marriage ===
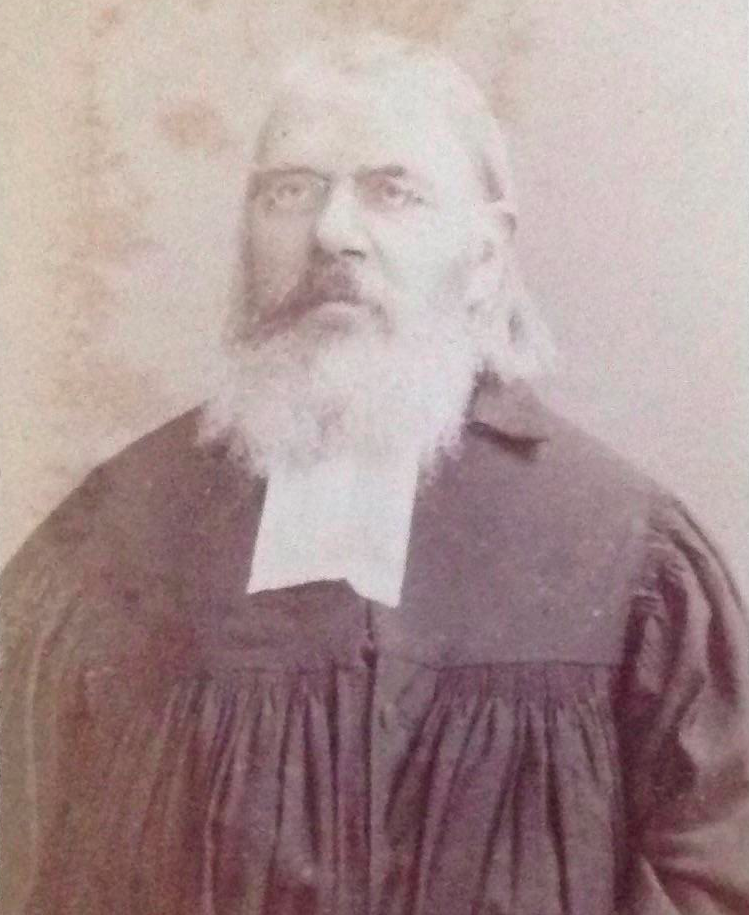
H.T. Wangemann.

In 1876, Winter married Elisabeth Wangemann, daughter of the influential Hermann Theodor Wangemann, who had become director of the BMS in Berlin in 1865. Wangemann was expecting an exemplary mission career from his son-in-law, but Winter struggled with the conformity expected from Botshabelo's white families, preferring the company of the local African evangelists and population. Through these interactions he became fluent in Sepedi, gradually developing a more inclusive attitude to the African culture and its leadership.

== Thaba Mosego ==
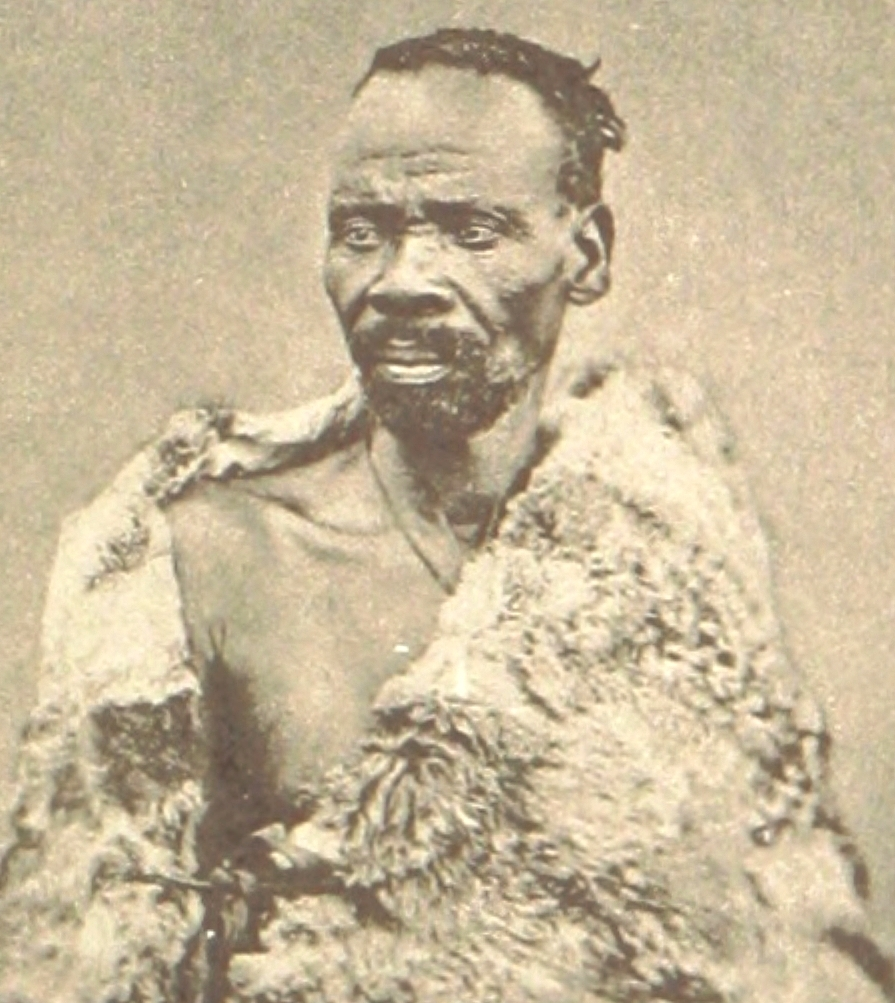
Sekhukhune I.

In 1880, the Winters were asked to establish a mission station at Thaba Mosego, the vanquished capital of the Pedi king, Sekhukhune, who had been defeated the year before by an army of British, Boer and Swazi soldiers. In 1881, Sekhukhune was released from prison by the British and returned to his old domain, where a strong working relationship developed between him and Winter. Sekhukhune even went so far as to propose a betrothal of Winter's infant daughter, Anna, as a future wife of his. This was initially rejected by Winter, but in time he agreed, on condition that Anna would have the final say once she came of age.

However, in 1882, Sekhukhune was assassinated by his brother, Mampuru, a crime for which Mampuru was captured and hanged in 1883 by the Boer government that had recently taken over from the British. Sekhukhune was succeeded by his brother, Kgoloko, who ruled for the next decade, maintaining mutually beneficial relationships with both Winter and Abel Erasmus, the ZAR's notorious "native commissioner" for the area.

== Lutheran Bapedi Church ==
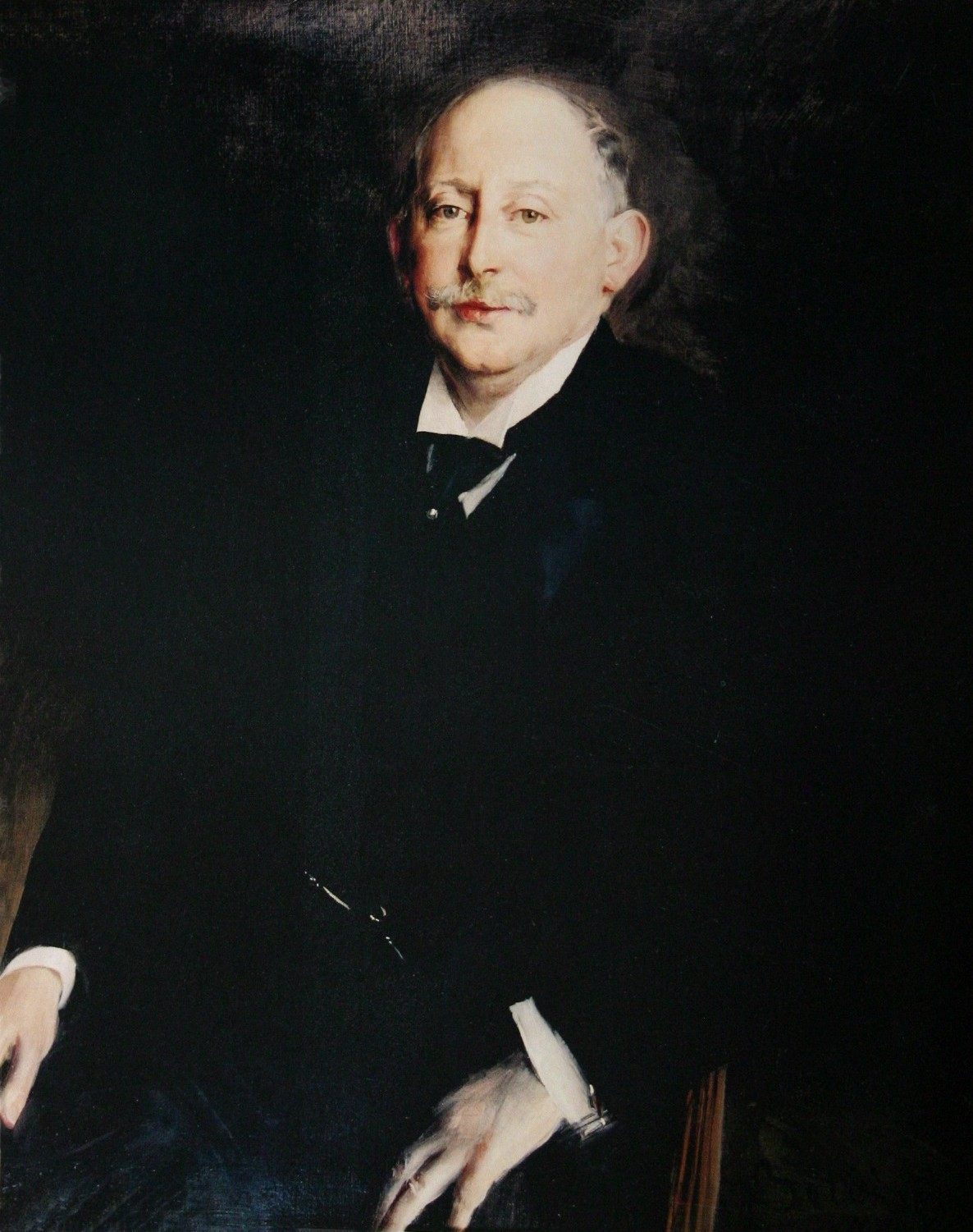
Alfred Beit, by Giovanni Boldini

In the period from around 1865 to 1883, the BMS kept paternalistic control over all aspects of the Pedi converts' lives, while simultaneously neutralizing any possible influence from any Pedi chiefs who wanted to retain the loyalty of their erstwhile subjects. Unhappiness steadily grew amongst the population, so much so that in 1889, Martinus Sewushane, a prominent native evangelist, and around 500 of his followers decided to secede from the BMS to form the Lutheran Bapedi Church (LBC). Winter, who was sympathetic to their cause, was asked to join them – he did, despite strong opposition and condemnation from Wangemann and other BMS leaders in Berlin. Through his relationship with Erasmus, Winter arranged for formal recognition of the new church by the ZAR government. After the Second Boer War, Winter returned to the Bapedi, settling on the farm Onverwacht near Schoonoord in 1904, which he had been given by Transvaal Consolidated Land and Exploration Company (TCL), owned by Alfred Beit's powerful mining company, Corner House Group, as a reward for discovering asbestos in the area.

== Retirement and death ==
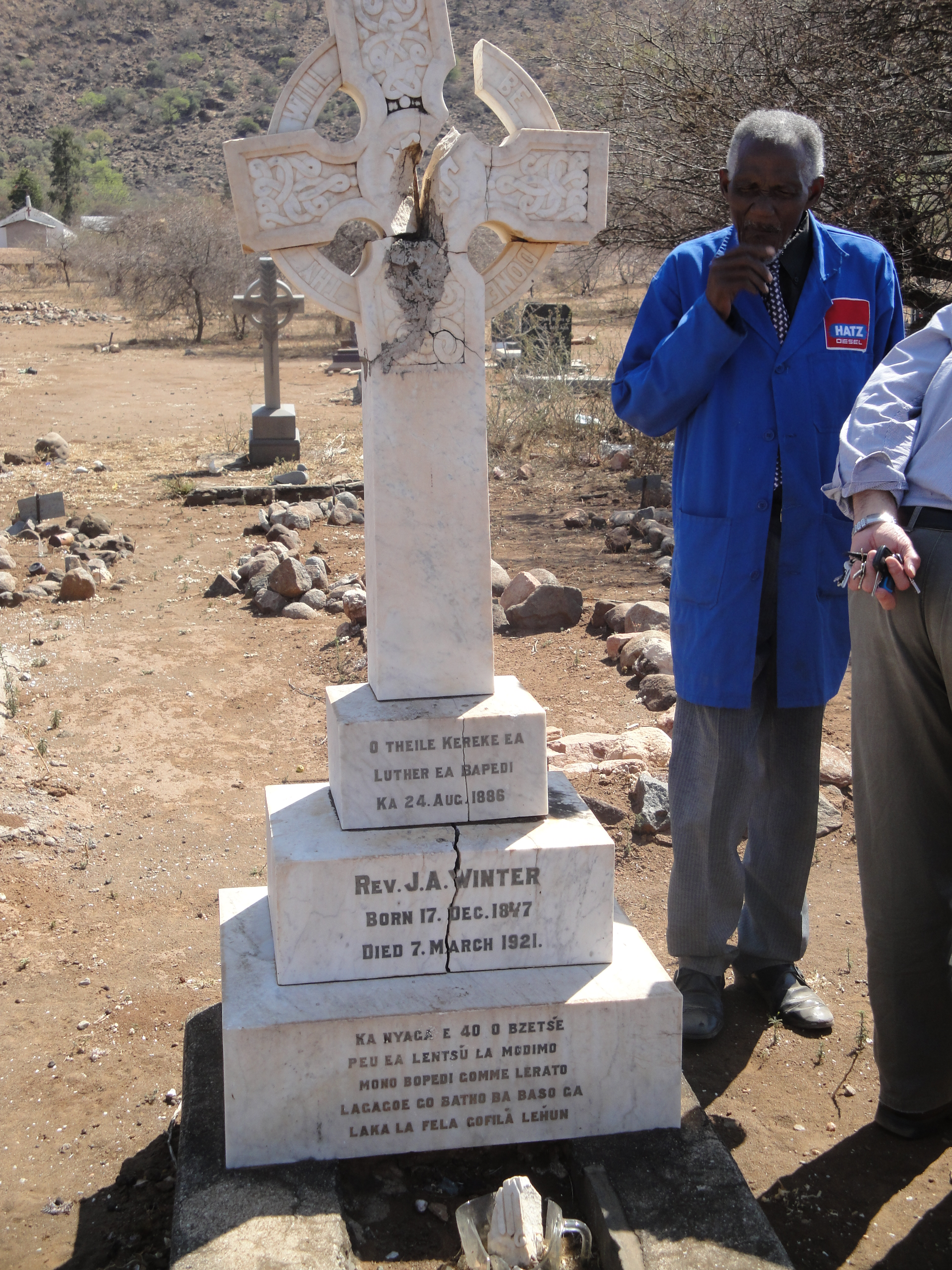
J.A. Winter grave

Winter retired from the LBC in 1917, spending his last few years with his eldest son, Christian, on the farm Mecklenburg in the Lydenburg area, still regularly conducting church services. He died on 7 April 1921 from heart failure.

== Published works ==
- "The History of Sekwati" (1912).
- "Hymns in Praise of Famous Chiefs" (1912).
- "The Tradition of Ra'lolo" (1912).
- "The Phallus Cult Amongst the Bantu; Particularly the Bapedi of Eastern Transvaal" (1914).
- "Native Medicines" (1914).
- "The Mental and Moral Capabilities of the Natives, Especially of Sekukuniland (Eastern Transvaal)" (1914).
