= Carl Knothe =

German missionary (1838–1892)

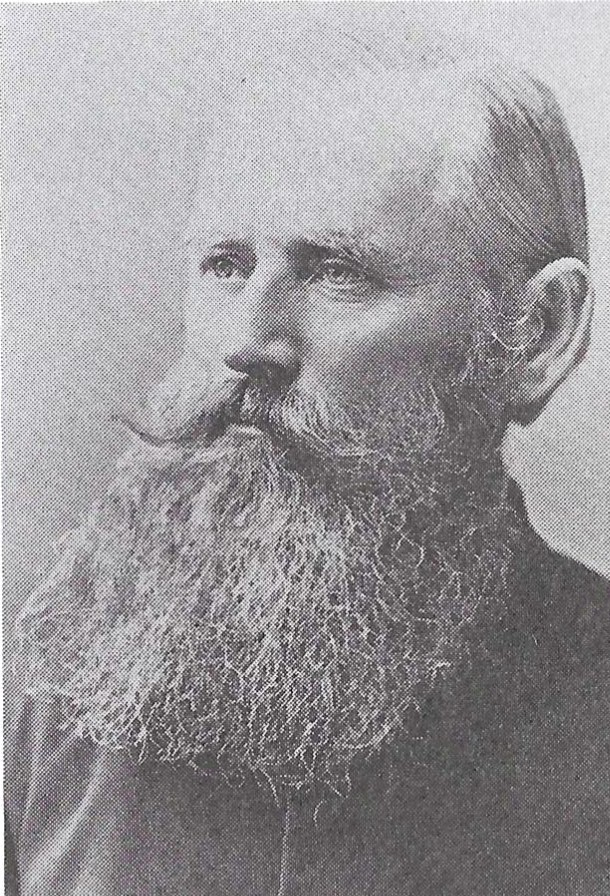
- Fürchtegott Johannes Carl Knothe
- Born: 6 December 1838; Tomaszów, Poland
- Died: 10 September 1892 (aged 53); Mphome, Northern Transvaal, South Africa
- Occupation: Missionary
- Spouse(s): Anna Magdalena Winter, sister of J.A. Winter
- Children: 5

Fürchtegott Johannes Carl Knothe (6 December 1838 – 10 September 1892) was a German Lutheran missionary for the Berlin Missionary Society (BMS) who became a pioneering figure in South Africa at the turn of the 19th century, against a backdrop of competing political and economic power struggles between British, Afrikaner and native tribal interests. He is best remembered for his educational reforms, the establishment of several mission stations, and his translation of the New Testament into the Northern Sotho (Pedi) language.

== Early life and education ==
Born as the second eldest son of a garment manufacturer, Knothe moved with his family to Görlitz on the Neisse River at the age of five. After completing primary school, he attended a gymnasium with the intention of studying for the ministry. However, following the death of his father in 1857, he was forced to abandon his formal academic studies. In 1859, through the mediation of a friend, Knothe moved to Berlin, where he enrolled at the Berlin Missionary Institute, completing his missionary training there 1863.

== Missionary career in South Africa ==
Knothe’s career in South Africa began in December 1863 as an assistant missionary at Kchalatlolu, a station founded by Alexander Merensky in Sekhukhuneland. His tenure there was cut short in early 1866 due to the hostile attitude of the Pedi King Sekhukhune toward the mission.

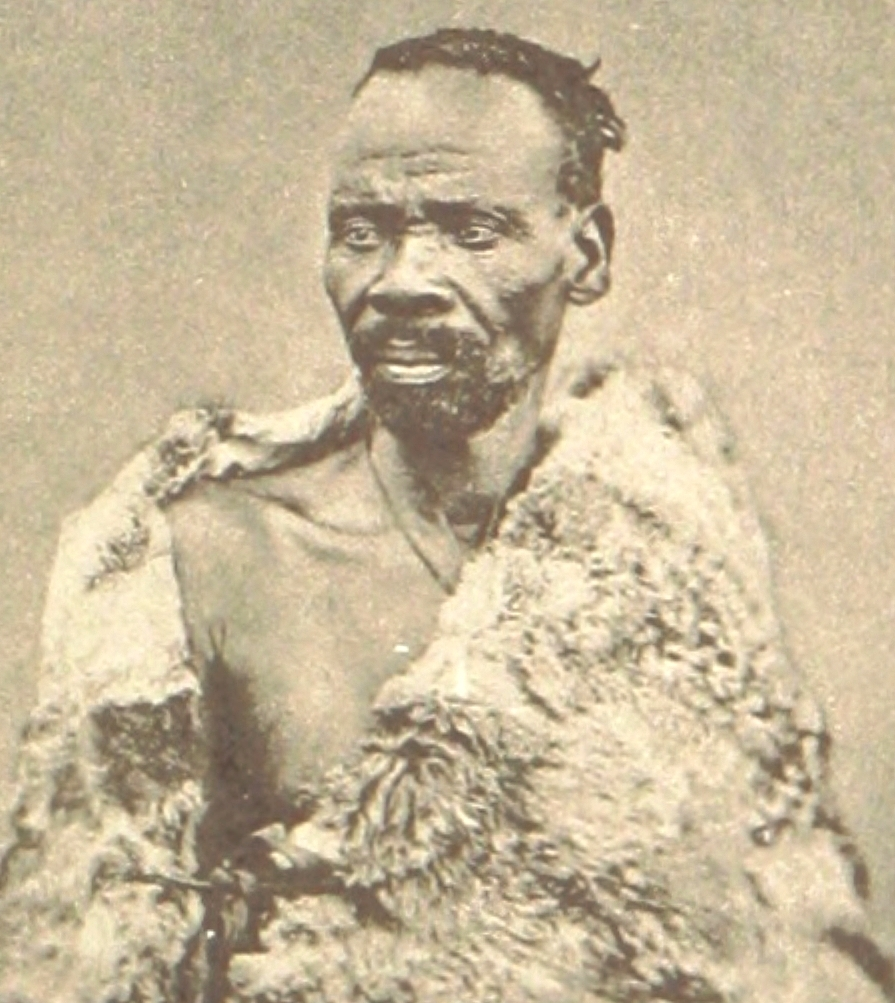
Sekhukhune I.

Following his departure, Knothe attempted to establish a station among the Bapo people in the Waterberg region of the Transvaal. Despite three months of persistence, the local chief, Bapo, remained hostile and threatened Knothe’s life, forcing him to flee. He was subsequently ordained as a missionary at the Gamatlale mission station.

== Establishment of BMS mission stations ==
Knothe was instrumental in founding several key missions:

- On August 4, 1866, with the assistance of fellow missionary Sachse, he started a mission station in Pretoria.
- He established an outpost at Wallmannsthal, which he expanded into a full-fledged station by 1869.
- In 1878, after being appointed Superintendent of the Northern Transvaal synodal region, he moved to Mphome in the Houtboschberge region to establish the station where he worked until his death.
- In October 1881, after visiting the famous Rain Queen Modjadji, he oversaw the founding of the Medingin station.
- Later, between 1888 and 1889, he traveled to Mashonaland (modern-day Zimbabwe) with Paul Erdmann Schwellnus, leading to the establishment of the Gutu and Zimuto stations in 1892.

== Educational and literary work ==
Knothe was a pioneer in the education of Black South Africans. His focus on training indigenous teachers was a primary reason for his promotion to Superintendent. His most enduring legacy is his linguistic work. He completed a translation of the New Testament into Pedi in late 1886 and assisted with its printing in Germany in 1890. He also authored several teacher textbooks and a Sotho hymnal.

== Personal life ==
Knothe married Anna Winter, the sister of fellow Berlin missionary Johannes August Winter, in 1867. He died at the age of 53 on 10 September 1892 on his farm in Mphome, Northern Transvaal.
