= Adelbert Theodor Wangemann =

German entrepreneur

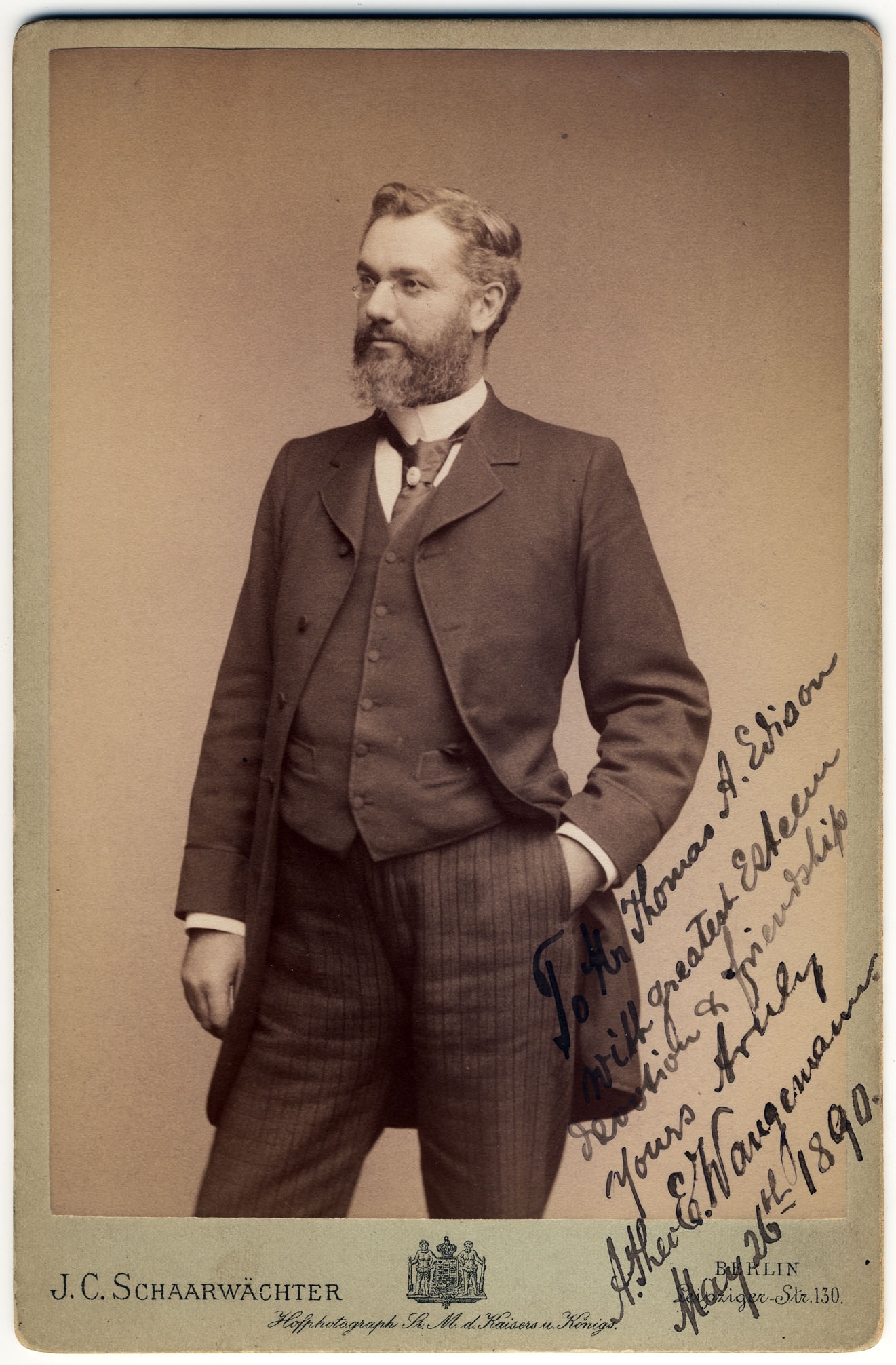
- Postcard to Thomas Edison from Berlin
- Born: Adelbert Theodor Edward Wangemann; February 13, 1855; Berlin, Kingdom of Prussia
- Died: June 1906 (aged 51)
- Occupation: Early recording engineer
- Years active: 1888–1906
- Employer: Edison Laboratory
- Known for: Recording Otto von Bismarck, Helmuth von Moltke, Johannes Brahms
- Spouse: Anna L. Blake (m. 1884)
- Relatives: Hermann Theodor Wangemann (uncle); Otto Wangemann

Adelbert Theodor Edward Wangemann (February 13, 1855 – June 1906), was a German recording engineer. In 1888, he began working for Thomas Edison as an assistant at his laboratory in West Orange, New Jersey. In 1889, Edison sent Wangemann to keep the phonograph at the 1889 Paris Expo in good working condition. The trip was extended and Wangemann made numerous early sound recordings on wax cylinders, some of which were lost for more than 100 years. Found in 1957, but not revealed until 2012, they include the only known recording of Otto von Bismarck.

== Early years ==
Wangemann was born in Berlin, Germany to Adalbert Theodor Wangemann (1815–1878) and Theodosia Sophie Ottilie Wangemann (née Rhenius) (died 1878). He and his older brother, born September 23, 1852, were named after their father. To distinguish them, he was called "Theo"; his first name also had a slight spelling change. He and his brothers later added third names, he added the name Edward; and his brother, Emil. (Note: Wangemann's brother had three children, one of whom was christened Adelbert Theodor Bruno Wangemann, but two years later, in the 1900 census, was listed as Theodor A. B. Wangemann.) By 1900, his brother had also changed his first name to Albert. The family was musical; his grandfather, Johannes Theodosius Wangemann, performed, directed, composed and taught music; and his cousin, Otto Wangemann, was an organist, composer and musicologist. His uncle, Otto's father, was also an organist.

Wangemann composed music, played and occasionally performed at the piano. Wangemann's father had a business selling paper goods and a factory where he manufactured envelopes and embossed monograms on writing paper. Both Wangemann and his brother worked there. His brother took over the business around 1876, but after their parents died in 1878 the brothers emigrated to the United States the following year, his brother in February and he in August. He first settled in Chelsea, Massachusetts and later moved to Boston. In 1884, he moved to New York City, where he became a naturalized citizen on October 11, 1884.

== Early sound recordings ==
Wangemann began working as an assistant to Thomas Edison at his laboratory in 1888, experimenting to find the best ways of recording music and voice. He has been called the world's first professional recording engineer. Recordings were made individually on wax cylinders, with no means of duplicating them. By December 1888, Wangemann had tried recording several originals at once, but this was insufficient to meet the request for the recordings, which were not yet being sold. Wangemann accompanied some performers on piano, ending with a brief seven-note "trademark" improvisation that annoyed some who heard these recordings. In March and April 1889, he recorded a number of musicians, including Hans von Bülow and John Knowles Paine.

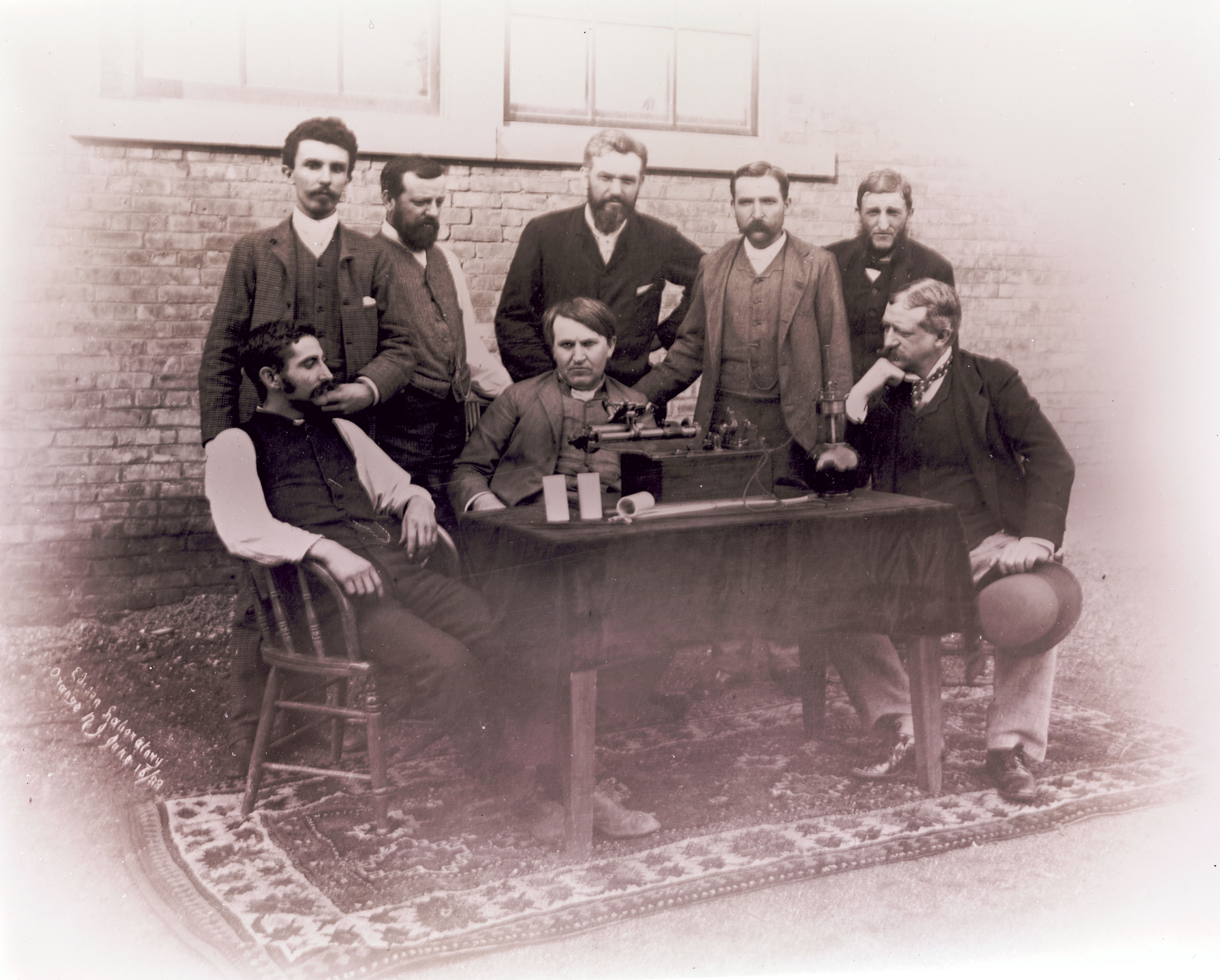
Edison with perfected phonograph and those who worked on it. Edison is seated, center; Wangemann is standing behind him.

The following year, after Edison learned that his phonograph exhibit sent to the 1889 Paris Expo was not operating properly, he sent Wangemann and a few assistants to Europe to ensure the phonographs worked properly, but later extended the trip; Wangemann used the opportunity to make additional recordings for use in exhibitions. While he was in Europe, more than 2,000 blank cylinders were sent to Wangemann for this purpose and he recorded a number of prominent individuals, musicians, comedians, singers and statesmen, and the trip turned into a public relations sensation. Beginning with artists who were at the Paris Expo, Wangemann recorded pianist Édouard Risler, the popular French café-concert singer Paulus, and Charles-Marie Widor, an organist, among others. On August 29, 1889, he recorded four Hungarian singers, the Tacianu Sisters. This cylinder became a particular favorite of Wangemann's, and he lauded the "international value" of the new American invention, which enabled a German audience to hear a Russian melody once sung by a Hungarian quartet on a French stage.

Edison, also traveling to Europe, sent Wangemann to Berlin, where he was to show the phonograph to Werner von Siemens. Von Siemens, a friend and business partner of Edison's, provided a special room for Wangemann, as well as a German mechanic to assist him while he toured Germany and Austria-Hungary. Wangemann made a number of experimental recordings of prominent musicians and individuals. He also demonstrated the phonograph and recordings to different groups. On September 18, he gave a demonstration to scientists and professors in Heidelberg and two days later, to a group of electrotechnicians in Frankfurt. Wangemann's behavior at both of these events provoked some criticism from the audience. In Heidelberg, where Edison was the guest of honor, he took over the address, during which some of his comments were viewed as out of turn. In Frankfurt, where he spoke to a wider audience in a packed hall, he condescendingly made them look unsophisticated and feel unworthy of his time.

During this period, Wangemann received invitations for demonstrations from Bismarck, Helmuth von Moltke, Wilhelm II and Czar Alexander III of Russia, then in Berlin. Wilhelm II did not make a recording, but his young sons, Wilhelm, Eitel Friedrich and Adalbert did record a cylinder. Wangemann's tour drew much attention, attracting additional invitations that made his schedule and budget difficult to maintain; those extending the invitations were equally hard pressed for time, and visits often had to be scheduled more than once. Some also wanted repeat visits from Wangemann.

Edison and those traveling with him returned to the United States on September 28; Wangemann and his wife, who accompanied him, stayed in Europe. The first attempt to meet with Bismarck having failed, a second opportunity arose a week later for Wangemann and his wife to go to Friedrichsruh, to Bismarck's castle. While there, he recorded a wax cylinder, as reported in the press at the time, but which was then lost for more than 120 years. Bismarck, like everyone, was fascinated with the new invention and Wangemann spent several hours with him, even missing his train to Berlin. Wangemann met with Czar Alexander III on October 12. After weeks of postponements, this invitation that had meant so much to Wangemann found the Czar little interested in the phonograph and not interested in making a recording. A second visit took place, but shortly beforehand, the Czar was prevented from seeing Wangemann. While in Berlin, waiting to see the czar, Wangemann gave daytime demonstrations to artists, scientists and civil servants; in the evening, he gave demonstrations in private clubs to their invited members, often drawing crowds. Shortly before leaving Berlin, he organized a charity concert, where he charged admission, possibly his only European appearance with an entrance fee. Despite the 20-mark entrance fee, then equivalent to an average working man's weekly wage, the hall was full, showing how eager people were to hear the voices of Bismarck and the German crown princes.

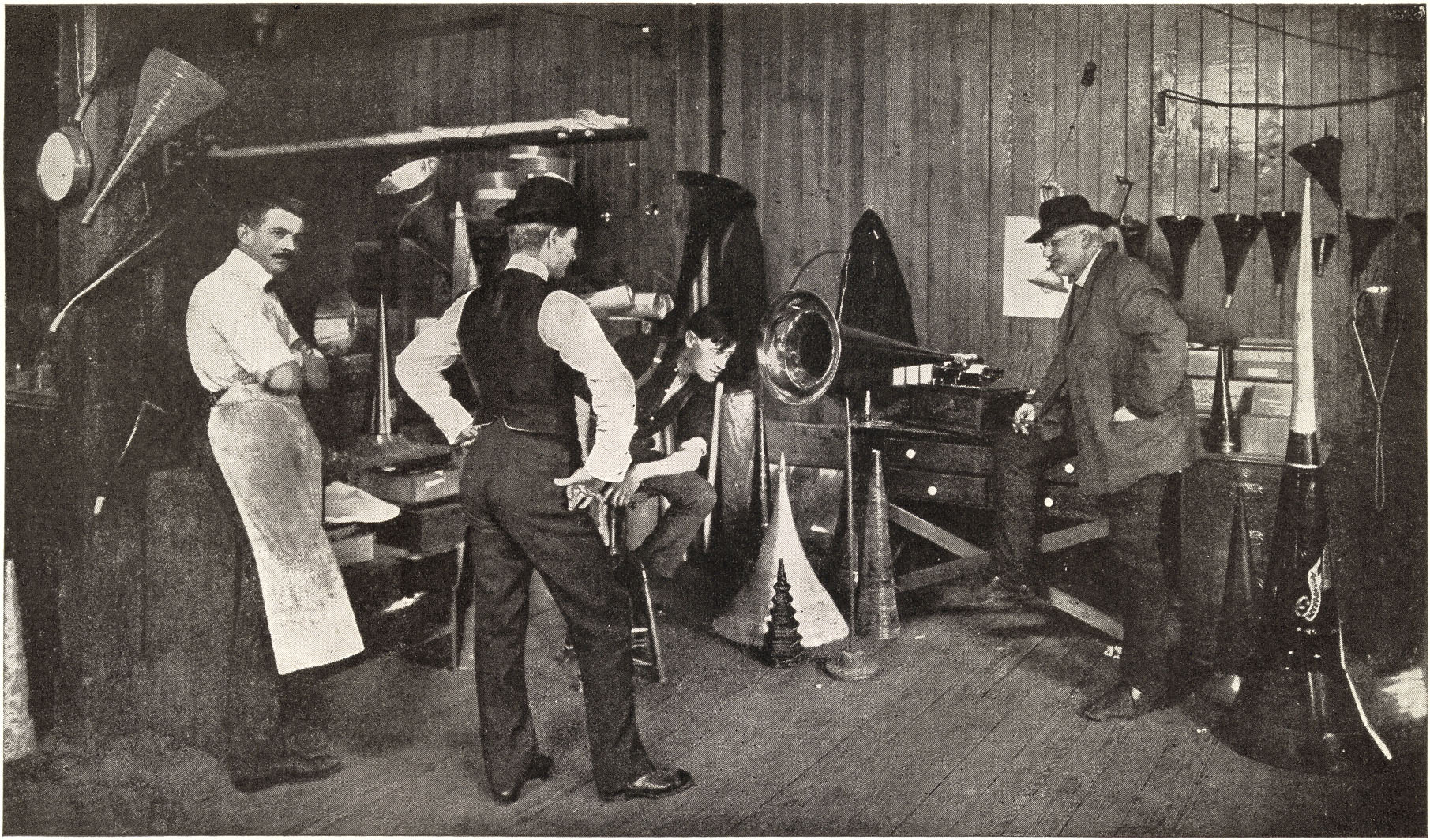
Wangemann (right) at the Edison laboratory, ca. May 1905

Recording of von Moltke's voice

Wangemann, his wife and his assistants left Berlin on October 20 and, having been unable to see von Moltke on their first attempt, spent two days with him on the way to Vienna. Of the four cylinders recorded by von Moltke, only two are known to exist today. Wangemann's recordings of von Moltke are the only known recordings still audible of someone born in the 18th century. Wangemann and his party arrived in Vienna on October 25, where Wangemann held more demonstrations and made more recordings, including that of Alfred Grünfeld and Johannes Brahms. His primary motivation for the trip, however, was the invitation from Franz Joseph I to show him the phonograph. Again, though, Wangemann had to wait days for the meeting, during which time, he gave interviews to journalists, one a day, very likely recording them in demonstrating their utility. The journalist granted the interview was to transcribe it and share it with other newspapers. Wangemann met with Franz Joseph I on two occasions, but did not record his voice. On December 2, 1889, the night before leaving Vienna, Wangemann recorded Brahms playing an abbreviated version of one of his compositions.

Wangemann returned to Berlin at one point, borrowing money from Siemens & Halske. Edison ordered him to return to the States not long after, having learned about the sums Wangemann had borrowed. Before leaving, Wangemann made some further recordings in Cologne, including one of Otto Neitzel, his only recording. Before Wangemann returned from Europe, Edison stopped the recording and experimentation at his laboratory. Wangemann worked at the laboratory until June 1890, then left for another exposition, after which he began working at the New York Phonograph Company, staying until 1893. He then stopped recording professionally, although he continued his own experiments at home, occasionally sharing them with Edison. Information about his work for the next several years is sketchy until he returned to Edison Laboratory in 1902, eventually resuming his experiments in the room where he had previously worked, as photographs show.

Wangemann was killed in a train accident in Brooklyn in early June 1906. Many of his recordings, in particular, the one of Bismarck, were considered lost for over 100 years. The wax cylinders were found in 1957, when Edison's home and laboratory were donated to the United States' National Park Service but they were unlabeled and remained unidentified until 2011, when two sound historians were able to deduce their identity. On January 30, 2012, the Thomas Edison National Historical Park announced that it had the original wax cylinder recordings of Bismarck, von Moltke, and others.

== Personal ==
Wangemann married Anna L. Blake in Boston on February 21, 1884. His uncle was Hermann Theodor Wangemann, who became director of the Berlin Missionary Society in 1865. While visiting a relative in Altenkirchen, Ottilie Klaube (née Wangemann and called "Odo"), Wangemann recorded a message, presumed to be to his brother. Julius and Ottilie Klaube also spoke on the recording, made on January 14, 1890.

He was a member of New York's Pleiades Club, where he played piano on certain occasions.

According to the FamilySearch International Genealogical Index, which in 1950 made a microfilm of parish documents held at the Lutheran church in Luisenstadt, a section of Berlin, an Adelbert Theodor Wangemann was born on February 13, 1855, and christened on April 13, 1855.

== See also ==
- Thomas Edison National Historical Park
