= Merensky =

Merensky may refer to:

- Hans Merensky (1905–1992), a South African geologist, prospector, scientist, conservationist and philanthropist
  - Merensky Reef, a layer of igneous rock in the Bushveld Igneous Complex (BIC) in the Transvaal named after Hans
  - Merensky Library, University of Pretoria, a library named after Hans
- Alexander Merensky (1837–1918), a German pioneer missionary in South Africa
