= Rudolf Friederich Gustav Trümpelmann =

German missionary

Bible translation committee (Left to right) Abraham Serote, Gustav Eiselen, ?, and Gustav Trümpelmann.

Gustav's Grave at Botshabelo.

Rudolf Friederich Gustav Trümpelmann (14 April 1841 – 19 April 1923) was a German missionary in South Africa from April 1868 until his retirement in 1912. Born in Brandenburg, Prussia, he died in the mission station Botshabelo.

== Gustav in South Africa ==
His father died while he was young, so at age fourteen due to financial circumstances he had to leave public school to work as a weaver like his father. As an enthusiastic member of the Christian Endeavor Society he developed the desire to become a missionary. He studied at the Institute of the Berlin Missionary Society to pursue that dream. During his studies he exceled at and had a significant interest in language and music. After his ordination in April 1868 he was sent to the mission station at Lydenburg to assist the elderly Nachtigal and learn Sesotho. Eight months later he was instructed to start a new station among the subjects of Monjebodi in the Makgabeng mountains south of Blouberg in Northern Transvaal. He set out alone with an ox wagon building his first small home himself. Every Sunday he would preach in local villages with his viola. Baumbach later arrived in Makgabeng and together they erected a small stone church beside Gustav's home.

=== Gustav loses his new horse ===
In 1871 he went to Waterberg to collect a horse paid for him by the mission. On his return trip to Makgabeng he was attacked by lions and his horse had run off leading the lions away. With the loss of his horse he went to Matlale with his ox to report his horse missing. Köhler, who was staying at Malokong, decided to ride to Matlale to find Gustav's horse, Eventually he found the horse and began bringing it back to Gustav. On the way back Köhler had to cross a flooded river, his horse was swept away but he managed to grab onto Gustav's horse, which then brought him to shore. Over the course of two days the horse had managed to save the lives of two missionaries. Gustav could not believe his eyes when he saw his horse.

== Accomplishments ==
First Translation of the bible into Sepedi with the help of Abraham Serote in 1904.

Writing Padisô Katekisima, a handbook for catechism teaching

Writing Kôpêlo, a hymnal deeply enjoyed by the gospel loving locals.
