= Pniel =

Pniel may refer to:

- Penuel, biblical place
- Pniel, Northern Cape, mission station on the Vaal River between modern Barkly West and Kimberley, South Africa
- Pniel, Western Cape, settlement in South Africa, between Stellenbosch and Franschhoek
