= Richard Miles (Tswana catechist) =

Richard Miles was a Motswana (Tswana) catechist and preacher "to the native tribes beyond the border" in South Africa.

== Origins ==
Nothing definite is known of Richard Miles's origins, except that he was born a Motswana (Tswana), and as a youth was in the employ of the apothecary John Harfield Tredgold in Cape Town.

Tredgold was Secretary of the Cape of Good Hope Philanthropic Society "for aiding deserving slaves and slave children to purchase their freedom", and maintained regular association with mission activities. He would have been well acquainted with the London Missionary Society Superintendent, the Revd Richard Miles (who was also on the committee of the Philanthropic Society). The Revd Miles occupied the position as Superintendent at the Cape temporarily in the late 1820s, while Dr John Philip was in England.

It is presumed that Richard Miles, the Motswana, had been one of the many individuals displaced by turbulence in the frontier in the 1820s - when, indeed, through the so-called inboekseling system, many women and children in particular were "apprenticed" into a life of virtual slavery on colonial farms. It seems possible that the Philanthropic Society had rescued one such Motswana youth from that fate, who then took on a name in honour of the temporary Superintendent. Evidently he lived for a time in the Tredgold household in Cape Town and benefited by an education, before returning to beyond the frontier to teach and to preach.

An important source in support of some of the above is the diary of one John Thomas Pocock, Tredgold's assistant, who described a party given by the Tredgolds on 1 September 1836, adding: "Much enjoyed the evening during which Mr T. amused the company by reading aloud Richard Miles's letters. While the quaint expression elicited continual laughter, the spirit of the whole pleased us all." Miles was "a Bechuana boy formerly in the employ of Mr T. but now an itinerant preacher to the native tribes beyond the border".

== At Bethanie and Bethulie in the Free State ==
In 1834, Richard Miles travelled, as interpreter, with the Berlin Missionaries to establish a station amongst the Tswana in the interior (they joined Andrew Smith's "Expedition into Central Africa" at Graaff-Reinet).

In the event, Matabele incursions into Tswana territory persuaded the missionaries that work amongst the Korana - at the place they named Bethanie - would be a better idea. And so Miles's interpretive skills were tested to the limit: some of the Korana had a smattering of Setswana, while Miles himself soon learned the basics of their language. An early encounter with local San stumped both the missionaries and their interpreter. (It is on record that Miles spoke "the most fluent Setswana" when a group of Batswana visited the missionaries in August 1834).

In 1848 Carl Wuras obtained permission to employ "the Bechuana Richard Miles" - formerly interpreter - as "school assistant" - "the same man who came with our first missionaries from Cape Town to Bethanie". Later, in 1850, Wuras described how three Batswana had learned the Articles of Faith in one evening, having been instructed in their own language by the assistant Richard Miles. Miles assisted at this period in providing education to children as well as adults.

In March 1850, when the government of the Orange River Colony sought to appoint a headman or Kaptyn for Bethanie, it was Richard Miles whom Wuras recommended to Maj Warden: "a Bechuana by birth and assistant at the school, who could understand and speak English, Nederlands, Setswana and Korana". And thus it was that the British Resident appointed Miles as Kaptyn of Bethanie in the name of His Excellency the Governor of the Cape.

By the late 1850s Miles was with the French Missionaries, and acted as agent for the Tswana Chief Lephoi, at Bethulie. Here he became embroiled in land speculation, with one George Donovan, which led to the loss of land by Lephoi and the missionaries, and the beginnings of the white town of Bethulie.

== On the Diamond Fields ==
Lewis and Edwards, in their 1934 Historical Records of the Church of the Province of South Africa (Anglican Church of Southern Africa), state that "The mission to the natives in Kimberley was set on foot about 1870 by a Mochuana called Richard Miles, and after his death it was carried on by Rev. E. Lange". Miles possibly went to the Diamond Fields region under the auspices of the Berlin Missionary Society at their station at Pniel.
