= Schoonoord, South Africa =

Schoonoord Kgalatlou
- Location within Limpopo Location within South Africa
- Coordinates: 24.749°S 30.010°E
- Country: South Africa
- Province: Limpopo
- District: Sekhukhune
- Municipality: Makhuduthamaga

Area
  - Total: 12.36 km^{2} (4.77 sq mi)

Population (2001)
  - Total: 7,556
  - Density: 611.3/km^{2} (1,583/sq mi)

Racial makeup (2001)
  - Black African: 99.96%
  - Indian/Asian: 0.04%

First languages (2001)
  - Northern Sotho, Sepedi: 97.98%
  - Swazi: 0.67%
  - Sotho: 0.4%
  - Other: 0.95%
- Time zone: UTC+2 (SAST)
- Postal code (street): 1124
- Website: http://www.schoonoordonline.co.za/

Schoonoord is a village in Sekhukhune District Municipality in the Limpopo province of South Africa.It is one of first villages to develop early in Sekhukhune. The name Schoonoord is Dutch, it is imposed on the natives of this area by Berlin Missionary Society. Schoonoord is the center of the Sekhukhune District in Limpopo. Another name for it is Sekhukhune

The name Kgalatlou was popularly used before the missionary establishment in this village. Kgalatlou is situated between two mountains, a bigger one called Leolo Mountain and the smaller other called Kgalatlou. "Kgalatlou refers to the small holding plots, the mountain, the stream that runs between the mountains and the Lutheran Church which is situated on the smaller mountain." Mahapa (1987)

== Etymology ==
Kgalatlou is a portmanteau of animal names: Kgala-Crab and Tlou-Elephant. The water stream was a habitat to "King Crabs." The crabs were compared to an elephant in size hence the name Kgalatlou.

Alexander Merensky, a missionary, obtained permission to establish a mission from Kgoshi Sekwati, Sekhukhune kgoshi ya bapedi. A mission station was established in 1861 at Kgalatlou which was later officially named Schoonoord. A police station, post office and magistrate court were subsequently established. The offices were referred to as " ka lekgoweng" meaning at the whiteman's place. Schoonoord is surrounded by villages called Tshehlwaneng, Manganeng, Tsatane, Mashite and Maila.

== Traditional Leadership ==
Kgoši Maloma

Kgoši Mashegoana (Legare le Tswaledi)

Kgoši Mogashoa

Kgoši Seopela

Kgoši Tshesane

The chiefs co-exist in harmony despite their minor cultural practices, they have always shared water resources from the stream also called Kgalatlou and continue to farm alongside each other. Kgoshi Seopela was the first chief to arrive in this area and he is therefore the authority in this area. It is customary that a migrant or chief arriving at a territory must pay a courtesy visit to the presiding chief so that they can be allocated a piece of land.

Kotsiri and Phase 4 are built on idle pieces of land which were once plantations for subsistence farming. They are new sections in the Schoonoord jurisdiction which developed as a result of influx of people from neighboring villages and descendants from the five chiefs. GaSekele "eMkhondone" is situated on the east of Kgalatlou mountain. It is a place of residence of the Swazi and Sepedi speaking group.

== Administration ==
The South African government established the bantustans also known as the homelands. The northern homeland for Bapedi people was called Lebowa which is Sepedi for North. It is located in the Transvaal in north eastern South Africa. The Lebowa administration had offices across the homeland, the Sekhukhune Office was responsible for the community management of the schoonoord area. It is located on the foot of Kgalatlou Mountain which is on the border of Kgoshi Tshesane and Kgoshi Seopela compound. Kgalatlou mountain forms part of the Leolo mountains range which spread North towards Ga-Nchabeleng and South towards Stofberg. The administration offices included home affairs office where people from neighboring villages came for birth registration and Identity documents. During the Lebowa administration people travelled largely by buses across the homeland. They travelled from surrounding villages to Schoonoord and the bus stop was a hive of activity that attracted entrepreneurs. The movement of people towards the offices resulted in a small scale economic development in the village. The selling and buying of fruits, vegetables and refreshments dominated trade, and the makeshift stalls formed a commercial landscape of the village.

The formal trading was a preserve of a handful of families that included the Maloma's and Mogale's who established their businesses in the 1970s and maintained them through generations until the 2010s. From 2011 Asians brought indomitable competition in both formal and informal trade.

== Culture ==
Dinaka means horns. In Sepedi culture dinaka also refers to a traditional dance done by men and teenage boys, it is performed during weddings celebrations and initiation school graduation. The music that participants dance to is produced from a cow or impala horn. The skill shortage and unavailability of impala horns resulted in lack of music instruments for the dance however penny whistles and similar modern instruments are used.

Dipapetlwane is a women's dance, the rhythmic sound which participants dance to is produced by handmade shakers which are worn on the legs to provide an acoustic sound.

Tja Manyalo (wedding songs with a fast-paced techno rhythm) is a music genre which is exclusive to the greater Sepedi speaking region of the Limpopo province. It is performed at weddings by the bridal party and accompanied by a dance move called S'TEPE meaning step.

Koma is a cultural initiation practice for both girls and boys into adulthood. It is practiced by the three chiefs namely Maloma, Mashegoana and Seopela. There is a dispute between the incumbent chief at Kgoši Tshesane's compound and the royal council on the practice of initiation (Koma). The dispute is that Koma should not be practiced as it is not part of their heritage. It was not practiced by the forefathers of the incumbent chief and from this background the royal council disapproves of it. However those willing to get initiated into manhood by neighboring chiefs are not prohibited. Koma in the Schoonoord community and the Sekhukhune region at large has always been safe and fatality free.

== Religion ==
The community subscribes to African traditions and Christian values. The conflict of practicing both African traditions and Christian religion is widespread. There are several churches in the community namely Roman Catholic, Dutch Reformed, Lutheran Bapedi Church, Zion Christian Church, and the Evangelical Lutheran Church in S.A (ELCSA). The three Lutheran churches are located at Kgoši Tshesane's compound. The Lutheran Bapedi Church was established in 1889/90 by Reverend Johannes August Winter and Martinus Sebushane Moganedi, who had broken away from the German Lutheran Berlin Missionary Society.

There are Afro-Christian churches called "Mapostola". They emphasise a spiritual healing and it is common to find a leader in these churches with a spiritual gift of healing and to this effect they are referred to as "kereke tša moya". There are also Charismatic churches referred to as Bazalwane.

== Health Facilities ==
The Clinic at Schoonoord forms part of the pillars of development in this town. In the 1980s the clinic was used as a center for the "Operation Hunger" gardening project. This poverty alleviation project was administered at the clinic because the clinic had reliable water and malnutritioned children were identified for relief when they came for their regular vaccination sessions.

== Community Hall ==
Peter Nchabeleng Sports Complex in Kotsiri

== Schools ==
Kgalatlou High School

Makatane High School

Semashego Primary School

Schoonoord Primary School

Legare High School

Tšhabadietla High School

PhutloTau High School

Matime Primary School

Kgobisi Primary School

Tswaledi Pre-School Mokale Primary School

== Mountains ==
Seolwane

Kgalatlou

Šalabje

Mmadišwane

Nokomeetse

Lepopotlwane

Maadimo

Legare

Tshehla

Tšhweu

== Notable people ==
Professor Malekgapuru William Makgoba

Professor Mogobo Boy Nokaneng
