= Alexander Merensky =

German missionary in South Africa

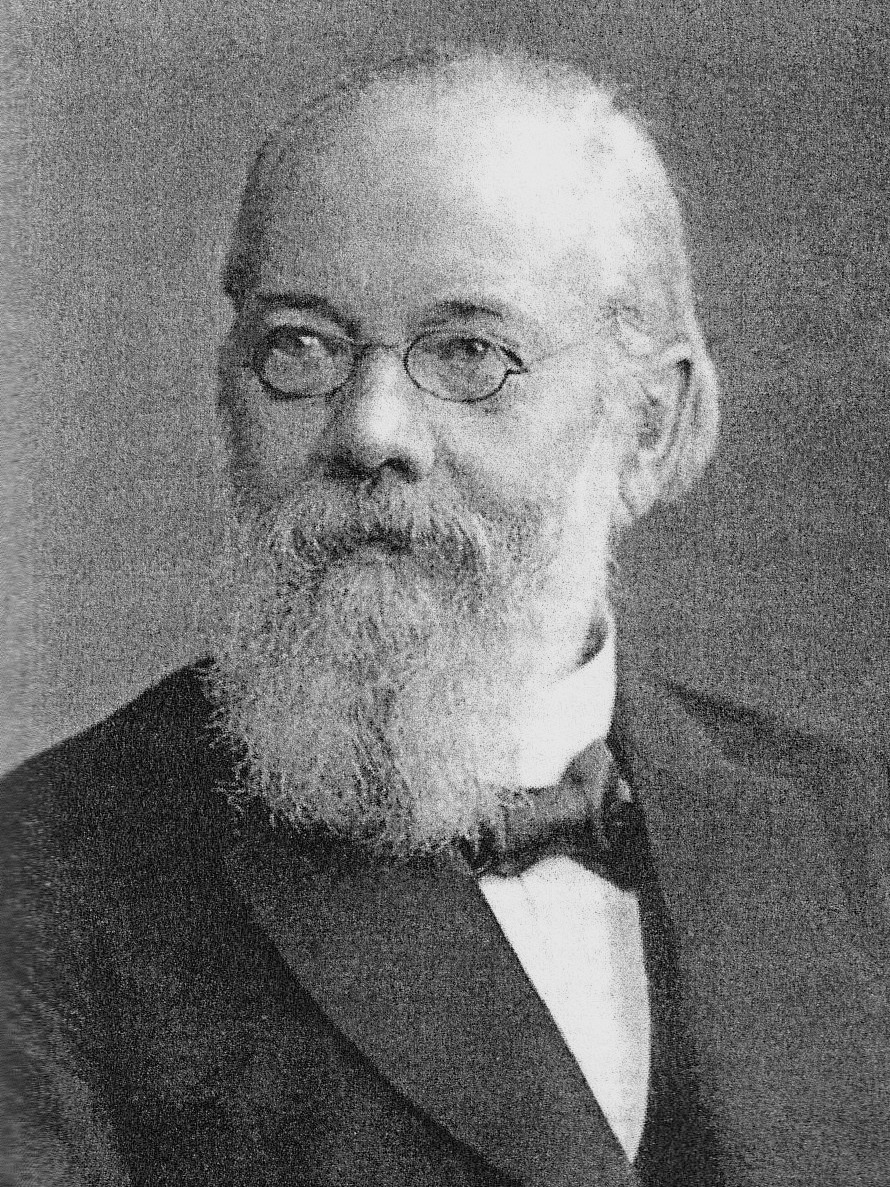
- Alexander Merensky
- Born: June 8, 1837; Panten
- Died: May 22, 1918 (aged 80); Berlin
- Occupation: Missionary
- Known for: Working in South Africa

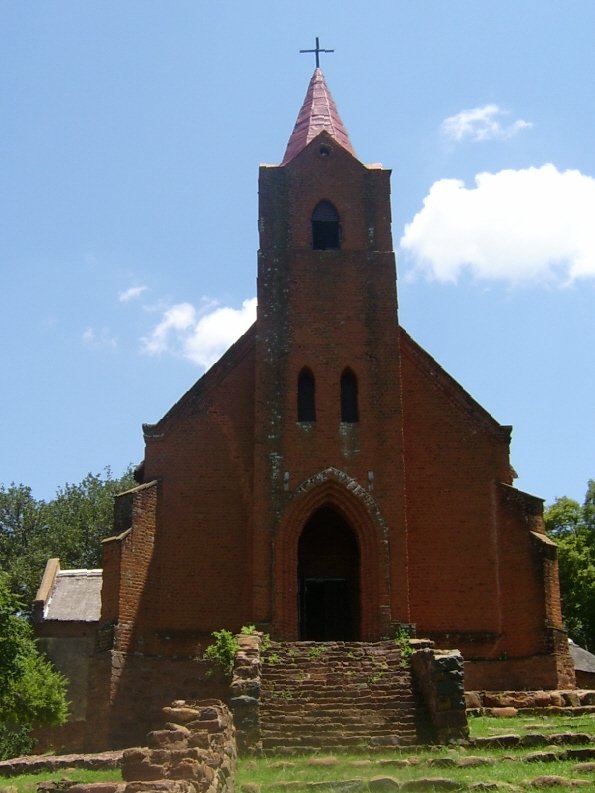
Mission church at Botshabelo

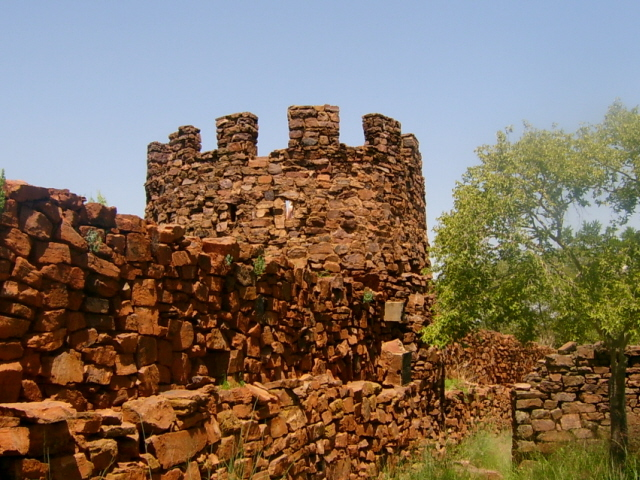
Fort Merensky

Alexander Merensky (8 June 1837 in Panten near Liegnitz – 22 May 1918 in Berlin) was a German missionary, working in South Africa (Transvaal) from 1859 to 1892.

== Early life ==
Alexander's mother, Pauline von Kessel, died during his birth, and his father, Conrad Albert Friedrich, seven years later, in 1844. He was therefore orphaned early in life and grew up in the well-known Schindler orphanage and among relatives. Encouraged by the well-known Rev. Gustav Knak, he entered the mission seminary of the Berlin Missionary Society in 1855 and was sent out on 23 November 1858. Together with a fellow missionary, Karl-Heinrich Theodor Grützner, he travelled by sailboat from Amsterdam to Cape Town and on to Natal.

== Mission stations ==
On 14 August 1860, he and fellow missionary Heinrich Grützner co-founded the mission station Gerlachshoop, the first mission station of the Berlin Missionary Society north of the Vaal River. Merensky was ordained as missionary in Gerlachshoop on 11 January 1861. A further mission station, Kgalatlou/ Schoonoord, was dedicated in August 1861. On 15 October 1863 Merensky was married to Marie Liers from Breslau. Seven children were born to this union, one of whom was the well-known geologist, Hans Merensky. They lived in Kgalatlou until May 1864 and with the permission of Sekhukhune, the leader of the Bapedi, founded the mission station Ga-Ratau, approximately 15 km from the Bapedi capital. This station was dedicated in May 1864.

However, shortly thereafter the first persecutions of the Christians started and Merensky had to flee with his family and congregation on the night of 23 November 1864. In January 1865 Merensky bought a farm in the district of Middelburg in the South African Republic (ZAR), where he and Grützner established the important mission station of Botshabelo, the Northern Sotho (Sepedi) word for "place of refuge". On the hill overlooking Botshabelo, a fort was erected which Merensky called "Fort Wilhelm" (later known as Fort Merensky) in honour of the German kaiser. During 1869 a blacksmith's shop, a workshop to build and repair wagons and a mill were built, allowing nearby villagers and members of the congregation to learn these skills.

In 1873 Merensky was joined by another BMS missionary, Johannes Winter, when he came to South Africa from Berlin to commence his missionary work. Within a few years he would become the head of the national helpers' (Nationalhelferen) seminary at Botshabelo, and later played an important role in the establishment of the Lutheran Bapedi Church when it seceded from the BMS.

The British annexed the Transvaal Republic in 1876 and Sir Wolseley made Botshabelo his headquarters in the Transvaal. During the First Anglo-Boer War, Merensky was conscripted to the Boer forces as military medic. He took part in the battles of Laing's Nek, Skuinshoogte and Majuba Hill and described the battles viewed from afar from his field hospital.

== Return to Germany ==
After the end of the war, Merensky was mistrusted by both the British and Boer authorities and decided to move back to Germany with his family in 1882. In 1883 he was promoted to Inspector of the Berlin Missionary Society.

In 1890 he travelled to Southern Africa again, this time to the northern shore of Lake Njassa (now known as Lake Malawi in Malawi) in the area called Kondeland. Here he founded two further mission stations, Wangemannshöhe (named after BMS Director Hermann Theodor Wangemann) and Manow. Being interested in geography, he later also published a map of this area. On his way back to Germany he had another opportunity to visit Botshabelo.

== Honours and legacy ==
Merensky received honorary doctorates from universities in Berlin and Heidelberg for his scientific publications. He died in Berlin on 22 May 1918.
