= Pniel, Northern Cape =

South Africa mission station

Pniel was a mission station established by the Berlin Missionary Society on the Vaal River between modern Barkly West and Kimberley, South Africa, in 1845.

== Establishment and early history ==
The Pniel Mission was established in 1845 by the Reverend August Wilhelm Winter, after exploratory expeditions from the Berlin Missionary Society (BMS) station at Bethanie. The missionaries had negotiated setting up a station with the Korana leader, Jan Bloem jnr.

Winter withdrew owing to ill health and was replaced by the Revd Ludwick Zerwick from Bethanie and Brother Nikolaas Meyfarth.

The Orange Free State claimed sovereignty over Pniel, and President Johannes Brand appointed a landrost to preside over it. A school, a courthouse and a prison were built, and the Free State Volksraad passed legislation to regulate the activities on alluvial diggings.

In 1847 an outstation was established at an old Wesleyan mission site at Platberg near the modern Warrenton, with the Revd Winter (now recovered) in charge. By 1851, however, Winter had retired yet again, choosing to return to Germany with his family, and was replaced by August Schmidt and F.W. Salzman.

== Prominent individuals associated with the mission ==
- Carl Wuras - BMS missionary and linguist at Bethanie who directed the work at Pniel.
- Richard Miles - Tswana catechist, probably at Pniel in the late 1860s/early 1870s.
- Sol Plaatje - the Tswana author and first secretary of the African National Congress.
- August Winter - BMS missionary and father of Johannes August Winter
