= Pleiades Club =

Former arts association in New York

The Pleiades Club was an association of artists and those with artistic interests in the area of Greenwich Village in New York. It was founded in 1896, was incorporated in 1902, and continued until the 1930s. The Club held weekly dinners and performances, and granted scholarships to budding artists. It published a yearbook, The Pleiad.

== History ==
The Pleiades Club emerged in 1896 from the gatherings of some members of the Greenwich Village artistic community in the small Italian restaurant of Maria del Prato on MacDougal Street. Among the customers of Maria's, the Pleiades Club named: Amos Cummings, Colonel William Gulder, Ripley Oswood Anthony, Paul Du Chaillu, Clara Louise Kellogg, Mark Twain, Valerian Gribayedoff, Signor Tagliapietra, "Billy" (W. E. S) Fales, Cleveland Moffett, Stephen Crane, "Billy" Welsh, Henry Tyrrell, Sam Chamberlain, Colonel Patton, William Garrison, George Luks, and Ernest Jarrold as its progenitors. For several seasons (each season lasted December through May) the Club continued to meet weekly at Maria's, first on Saturday and then on Sunday nights. As it became more widely known, the Club moved in search of larger quarters, first to the Black Cat (Uptown) and then to the Hungaria. After the first few years of uncertain and varying policies, in 1901 a new Board of Governors was elected, the name Pleiades Club regularly adopted, and the incorporation papers granted on January 9, 1902. After several seasons of moves, the Club settled in 1906 at the Hotel Brevoort on Fifth Avenue, where it remained for most of its existence, with the exception of a few short-term stays at Reisenweber's and Hotel Martinique.

The Pleiades members considered themselves "the best exponent of clean, right-minded Bohemianism in the city." ... The Pleiades had a boast: it "caters to bon vivant [sic] and ministers to the mind intellectual and artistic; it is a place where men and women mingle in social intercourse ... a place where poverty and riches, success and failure, rub shoulders without offense ..." The Sunday suppers were fun to go to, for the room was full of writers, artists, actors, musicians, lawyers, judges, politicians...

— Milton Meltzer, Dorothea Lange: A Photographer's Life (2000)

The Club's activities primarily consisted of weekly dinners, accompanied by an entertainment program, such as music performances and poetry readings, where club members and guests of honor gathered "to enjoy and foster the allied arts of Music, Drama, Art and Literature, and to Promote the spirit of good fellowship" (The Pleiad, 1931–32). The Club saw its mission as providing a friendly and appreciative audience to inexperienced artists, helping the needy artists with free scholarships in the various branches of arts, although it has been stated that "artists and writers fled from it as soon as some conventional burghers muscled into its portals". It was reported in 1904 that Theo Wangemann "always opens the first entertainment of the season with the 'Tannhäuser' march at the piano."

The Club apparently continued to function at least through the 1935/1936 season, since the 1936 yearbook was published (it is a part of The New York Historical Society collection).

== Howard Neiman ==
Howard Seiger Neiman (1868-1947) was a member of the Board of Governors throughout the Club's history, served as its Secretary in 1905-1908 and again in 1928-1933, and was elected President of the Club three times. Neiman was also a patent attorney, editor and publisher of Textile Colorist magazine (1918-1944). Born in Norristown, PA, he received a B. S. degree from Lehigh University in 1888 and entered the dyestuff and chemical industries. Neiman had studied at New York Law School, set up offices as a patent and trademark attorney, and became a leading legal adviser for the cosmetic industry. He served as chemical expert for Leopold Cassella & Co., H. A. Metz & Co. and other concerns.

Throughout his life, Howard Neiman belonged to numerous clubs and associations in addition to the Pleiades Club. He was a member of the American Chemical Society since 1893. A charter member of the American Institute of Chemists, he was named its honorary secretary in 1946, after having served as its secretary for twenty years. He was a member of the Salesman's Association of the Synthetic Organic Chemical Manufacturers Association, the Chemists Club, Theta Delta Chi, Old Colony and the Manhasset Bay Yacht Club. He also was president of the Municipal Opera Association and a Mason Knight Templar and Shriner. The Pleiades club was one of Neiman's long-time commitments.
