= Noel Chabani Manganyi =

South African forensic psychologist

- Born: c. 13 March 1940; Mavambe, Limpopo, South African
- Died: October 31, 2024 (aged 84)

Academic background
- Education: University of Limpopo; University of South Africa
- Alma mater: University of South Africa
- Thesis: "Body Image in Paraplegia"
- Academic advisor: Daniel Levinson

Academic work
- Discipline: Clinical psychology

Noel Chabani Manganyi (c. 13 March 1940 – 31 October 2024) was a South African professor of forensic psychology.

== Early life and education ==
Noel Chabani Manganyi was born around 13 March 1940 in Mavambe. There, he was raised by his mother and attended a one-classroom school for a year. His father had remarried and migrated to Johannesburg for work. After completing his early education, he enrolled at the University of Limpopo, then affiliated with the University of South Africa, earning his bachelor of arts in 1963, bachelor of psychology in 1965, and later his master's, and PhD degrees there. From 1973 to 1975, he completed a fellowship in clinical psychology from the Yale School of Medicine, under the supervision of Daniel Levinson.

== Career ==
In 1976, Manganyi established the department of psychology at the University of Transkei, and later joined the University of the Witwatersrand.

Manganyi's work covered psychology with a focus on Black subjectivity under apartheid, as well as on memory, biography, exile, and political violence. His biographies included that of Es'kia Mphahlele, Gerard Sekoto, and Dumile Feni. He also contributed his knowledge and insight to public institutions in South Africa. In 1973 he published a small book titled Being Black in the World, containing the essay Us and Them, followed by Mashangu's Reveries and other Essays in 1977. In 2016 he published his memoir titled Apartheid and the Making of a Black Psychologist. From 1994, he held several senior posts in education and academia, including Director-General of the national Department of Education under Sibusiso Bengu in Mandela's government, vice-chancellor of the University of the North, vice-chancellor of the University of Pretoria from 1999 to 2003, vice-principal of that university from 2003 to 2006, and chairperson of the Council on Higher Education.

== Selected publications ==
=== Articles ===
- "The Censored Imagination". English in Africa. 6 (2): 24–32. 1979. ISSN 0376-8902.
- "Psychobiography and the Truth of the Subject". Biography. 6 (1): 34–52. 1983. ISSN 0162-4962.
- "On becoming a psychologist in apartheid South Africa". South African Journal of Psychology. 43 (3): 278–288. 1 September 2013. doi:10.1177/0081246313493597. ISSN 0081-2463.

=== Books ===
- Gerard Sekoto:'I Am an African': a Biography. Wits University Press. (2004)
- Apartheid and the Making of a Black Psychologist: A memoir. NYU Press. 2016. ISBN 978-1-86814-863-9.

== See also ==
- Baragwanath Hospital
