= Carl Wuras =

German missionary to South Africa (1809–1891)

- Born: 9 June 1809; Hertzberg, East Prussia
- Died: 20 May 1891 (aged 81); Farm Vaalbank, Orange Free State
- Occupations: Missionary, Linguist
- Spouse(s): Johanna Sass, Elizabeth Harriet Every
- Children: 16

Carl Friedrich Wuras (9 June 1809 – 20 May 1891) was a German Lutheran missionary for the Berlin Missionary Society (BMS) who played an important role in the establishment of the BMS's missionary work in central South Africa at the turn of the 19th century. He was also instrumental in the early construction, development and preservation of the !Ora language in its written form.

== Missionary career ==
Wuras arrived in South Africa from Berlin in 1836 as a member of the second group of missionaries sent out by the BMS. His first posting was at Bethany, Free State (Bethanien), the first and oldest BMS missionary station in South Africa, where he was tasked to take over from five predecessors that had been dismissed due to internal organisational strife. In 1839 he was joined by another BMS missionary, August Wilhelm Winter, who would go on to establish another BMS mission at Pniel in the Orange Free State, before returning to Germany in 1851 due to ill health. August's children, including missionary Johannes August Winter, all returned to South Africa after receiving their education in Germany.

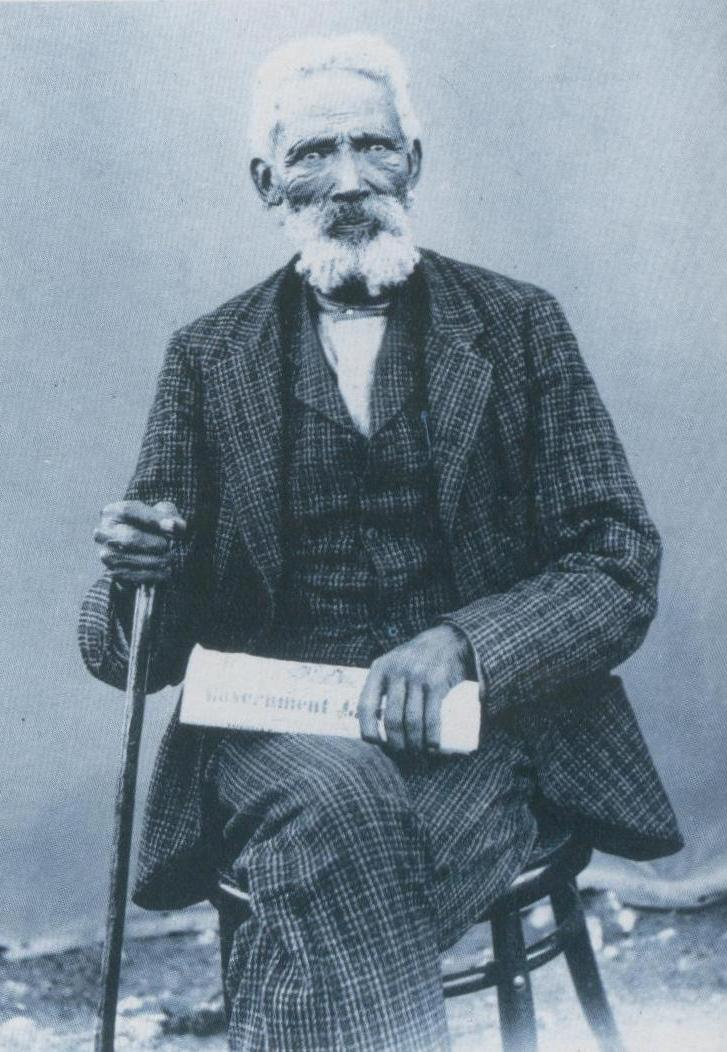
Nicolaas Waterboer. Leader of the Griqua People of Griqualand West in the Cape. A photograph of the elderly leader from the 1890s.

For the next 50 years Wuras worked amongst the Griqua people (Korana) around Bethany and Pniel, being credited with "setting the Berlin Mission Station on its feet". During his early ministry at Bethany, Wuras worked with Gert Cloete, a Korana interpreter and one of the mission’s first converts, who is believed to have provided the core of the input for Wuras’s later translation of the Christian catechism into the !Ora language.

== Linguistic and ethnographic contributions ==
Wuras's institutional requirement to master indigenous languages led him to become a foundational documenter of the endangered !Ora language, being recognised as the "principal agent in the construction, development and preservation of !Ora in its written form". He worked to reduce this previously unwritten language into script.

Wuras's most significant linguistic work is the Vokabular der Korana-Sprache (Vocabulary of the Korana Language), written in 1858 and published in 1920. This vocabulary is a crucial primary heritage text of !Ora. Because the language lacked a formal orthography at the time, Wuras was required to establish basic phonetic and writing conventions. His work provided a framework for later 20th-century linguists who built upon his analyses of the language's phonetics and syntax.

In 1859, Wuras authored An Account of the Korana with a description of their Customs. This work was commissioned for Sir George Grey, the then-Governor of the Cape Colony. It was considered "very thorough at the time" and was illustrated by colonial artist Charles Bell.

== Retirement and death ==
Wuras retired from the BMS in 1885, spending his last few years on his farm Hertzerg, next to Bethany. He died on 20 May 1891.
