= Botshabelo, Mpumalanga =

Botshabelo
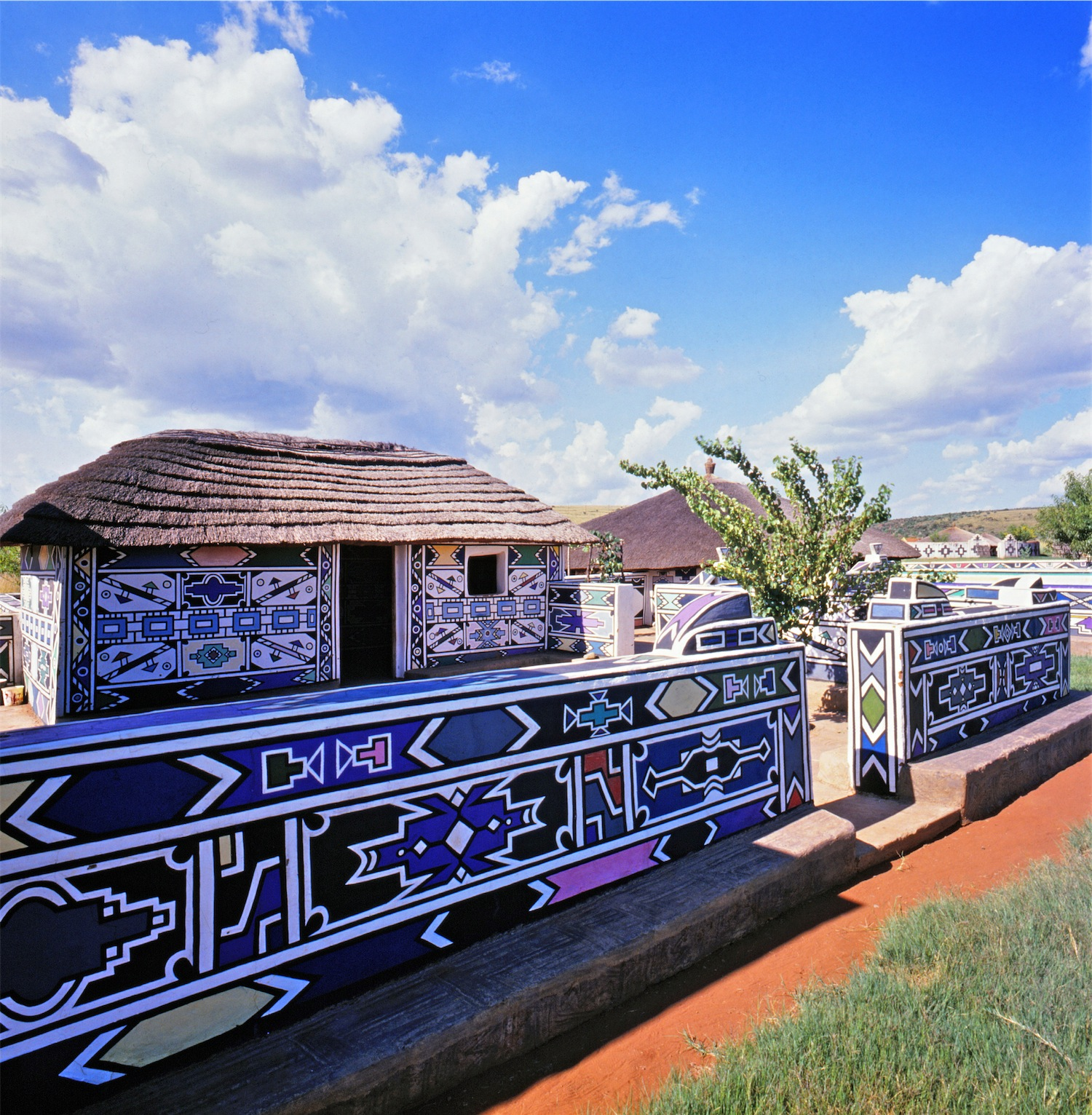
- Cultural heritage monument in Botshabelo

- Location within Mpumalanga Location within South Africa
- Coordinates: 25°41′59″S 29°24′35″E
- Country: South Africa
- Province: Mpumalanga
- District: Nkangala
- Municipality: Steve Tshwete
- Time zone: UTC+2 (SAST)
- Postal code (street): 9781
- PO box: 9781
- Area code: 051

Botshabelo ("place of refuge" in the Northern Sotho language) in the district of Middelburg, in Mpumalanga Province, South Africa, originated as a mission station established by Alexander Merensky of the Berlin Missionary Society (BMS), in February 1865 in what was then the Transvaal Republic (ZAR). Merensky had fled with a small number of parishioners following the attacks on his previous mission station, Ga-Ratau, by the soldiers of Sekhukhune, the king of the baPedi. Within a year of having established the mission station, the population had grown to 420 persons. In 1873 Merensky was joined by BMS missionary Johannes Winter, who went on to found the mission station at Thaba Mosego and also played an instrumental role in the establishment of the Lutheran Bapedi Church, when they seceded from the BMS in 1889.

The BMS focused on providing schooling and bringing the gospel to people in their own language. Hence the Society's missionaries were often at the forefront of publishing Bible translations, dictionaries and grammars in indigenous languages. It was as part of this process that Africans, duly trained and sometimes salaried, were accepted into the Society as teachers, catechists and lay-preachers, the so-called Nationalhelferen or national helpers.

One of these was one Jan Sekoto who was sent for further training in Germany. Returning earlier than anticipated, however, he took up a teaching post at Botshabelo. Sekoto's son Gerard Sekoto, born at Botshabelo in 1913, would later emigrate to Europe, obtaining French citizenship and achieving considerable renown as an artist.

Besides the vestiges of the past, today Botshabelo is a living museum for the Ndebele architecture. Differing opinions on how to manage the site, combined with a lack of resources and expertise, have led to a gradual degradation of a very important historical site and tourist attraction.

== Anglo–Boer War ==
During the Anglo–Boer War (also referred to as the South African War), both British and Boer forces showed interest in Botshabelo, particularly in Fort Merensky and other smaller but comparable forts built on the Botshabelo mission station. In the eastern Transvaal, a hotbed of the violence of this war, Botshabelo served as a crucial military installation for both sides.

The Boer military authorities were the first to attack Botshabelo. On September 30, 1899, Nauhaus reported that 82 Pedi Christians were forced to join the military after three ox-wagons full of food that had been taken from the mission station were confiscated. Again, 240 residents of Botshabelo were enlisted to drive wagons or work on Boer farms for the war effort.

== Publications about Botshabelo Mission Station ==
The Botshabelo Mission Station and Berlin Missionary Society's activities in South Africa have been extensively written about. Journals, books, dissertations and newspapers have turned their attention to this place of significance.

- Delius, P. 1983. The land belongs to us: the Pedi polity, the Boers and the British in the nineteenth century Transvaal. Ravan Press: Johannesburg.
- Rikotso, G, J. 2003. Rev. A. Merensky and the Bapedi people of Sekhukhune. University of Pretoria: Magister Atrium (Theology)
- Delius, P. & Ruther, K. 2013. The King, the missionary and the missionary's daughter. Journal of Southern African Studies. Vol. 39 (3) pp. 597 – 614.
- Malunga, F. 2003. Sekhukhune II and the Pedi Operations and the Anglo – Boer War, 1899 – 1902. Scientia Militaria. 31 (1). Pp. 19 – 36.
- Pakendorf, G. 1997. “For there is no power but of God:” The Berlin Mission and the challenges of Colonial South Africa. Missionalia. (Available online: https://www.oocities.org/missionalia/germiss1.htm)
- Pakendorf, G. 2011. A Brief History of the Berlin Mission Society in South Africa. History Compass Vol 9 (2). Pp.106–118,
- Poewe, K. & v.d. Heyden, U. 1999. The Berlin Mission Society and its Theology:
- The Bapedi Mission Church and the Independent Bapedi Lutheran Church. South African Historical Journal. 40 (May 1999). Pp. 21 – 50
- Ruther, K. 2012. Through the eyes of missionaries and their archives they created. The interwoven histories of power and authority in the 19th century Transvaal. Journal of Southern African Studies. Vol. 38 (2). Pp. 369 – 384.
- van der Heyden, U. 1996. The archives and library of the Berlin Missionary Society. History in Africa. Vol 23. Pp. 411 – 427

== Ndebele architecture of Cultural Village ==
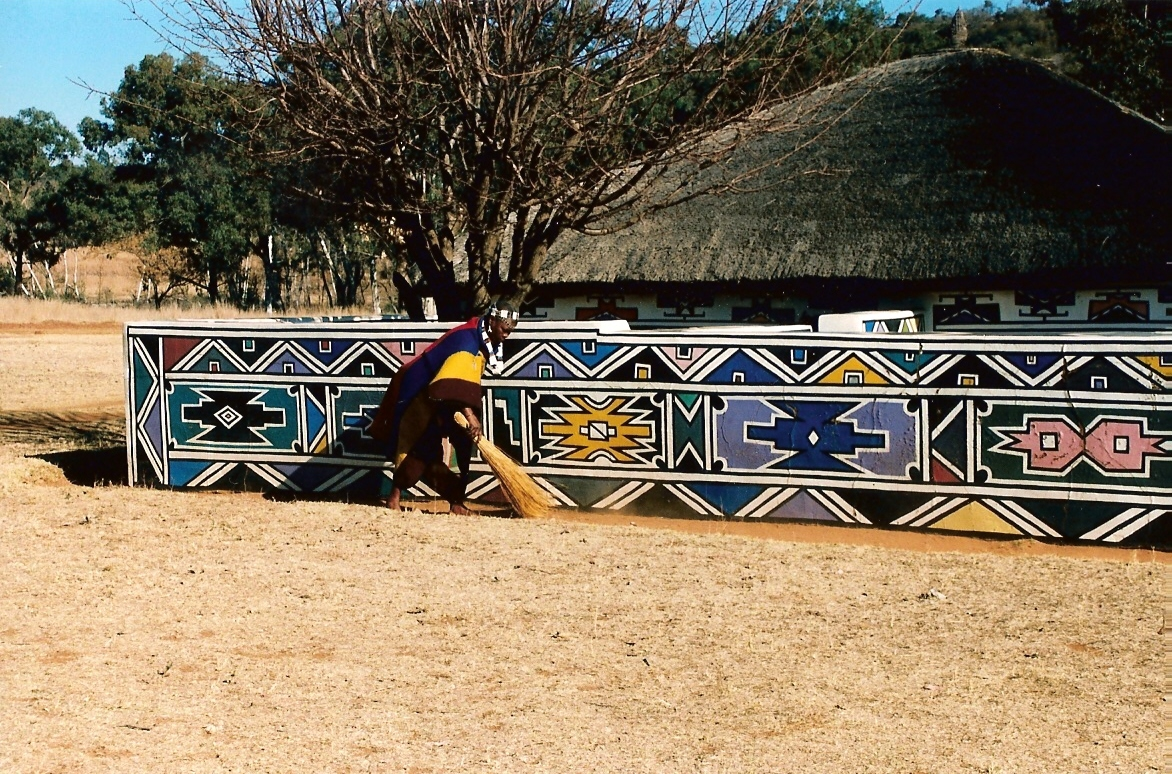
House in Botshabelo

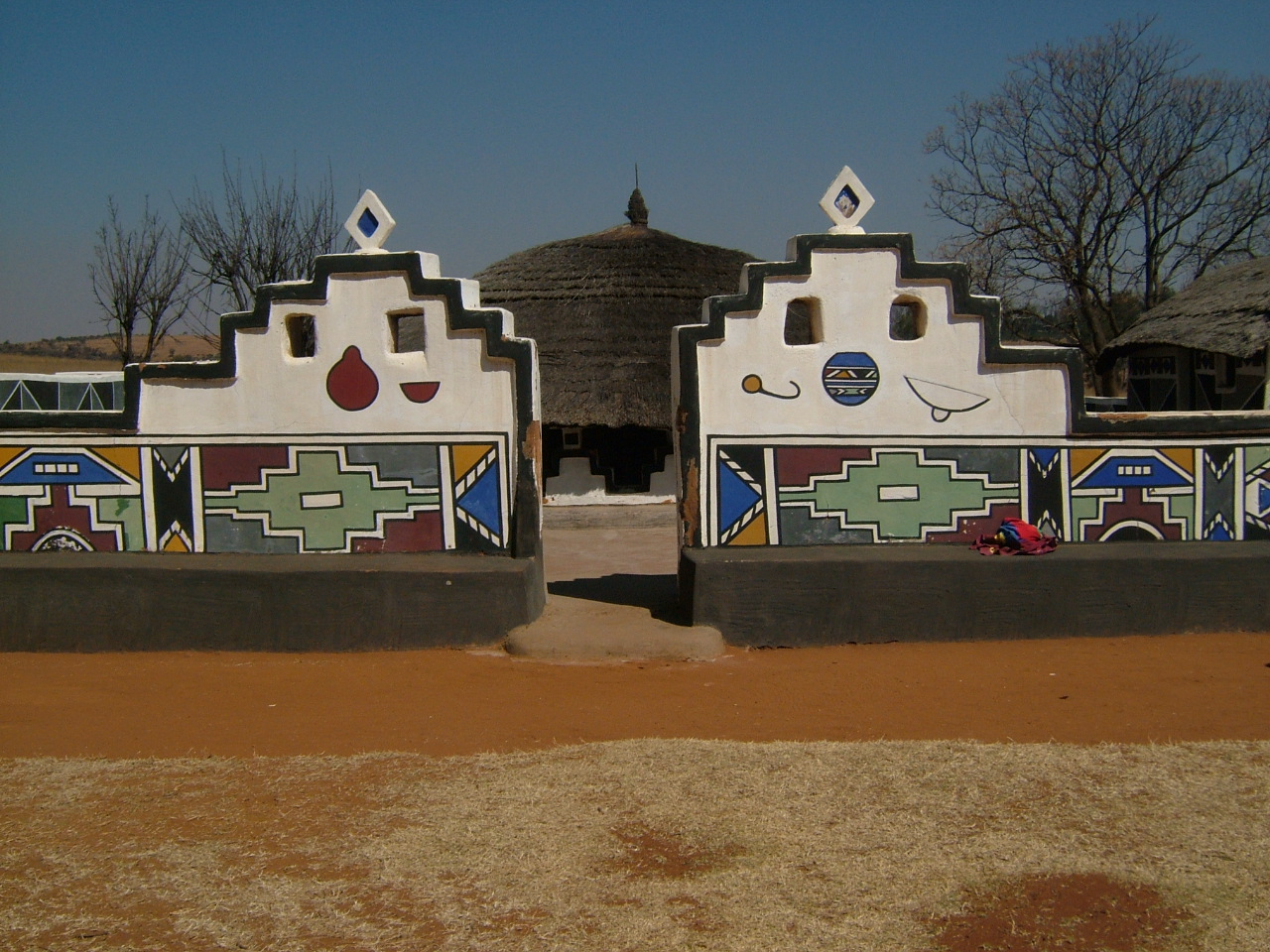
Village Ndebele

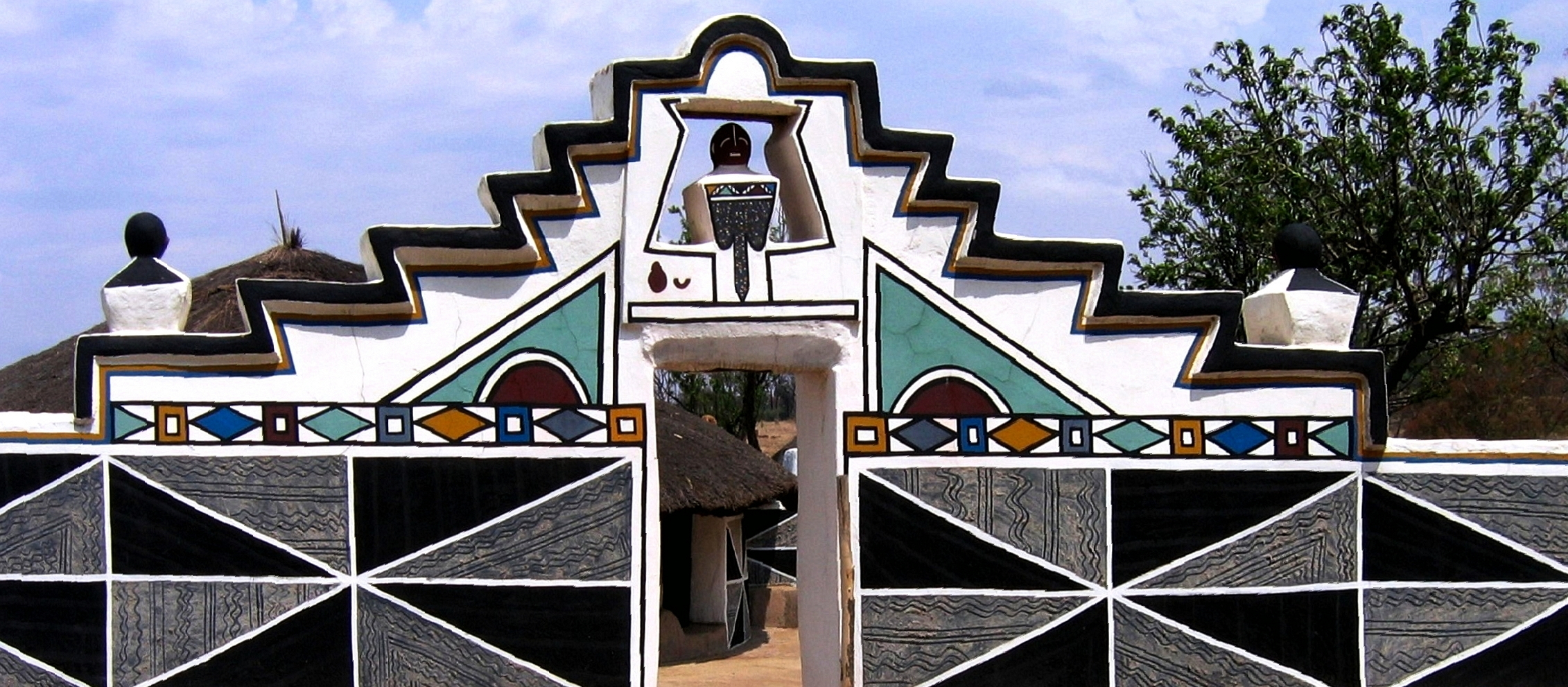
Portal

== Botshabelo, Middelburg ==
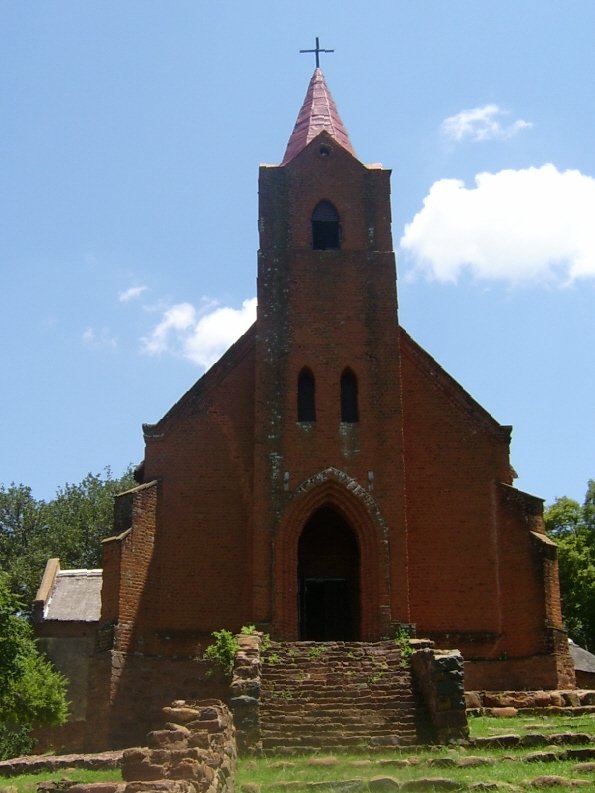
Old mission in Botshabelo

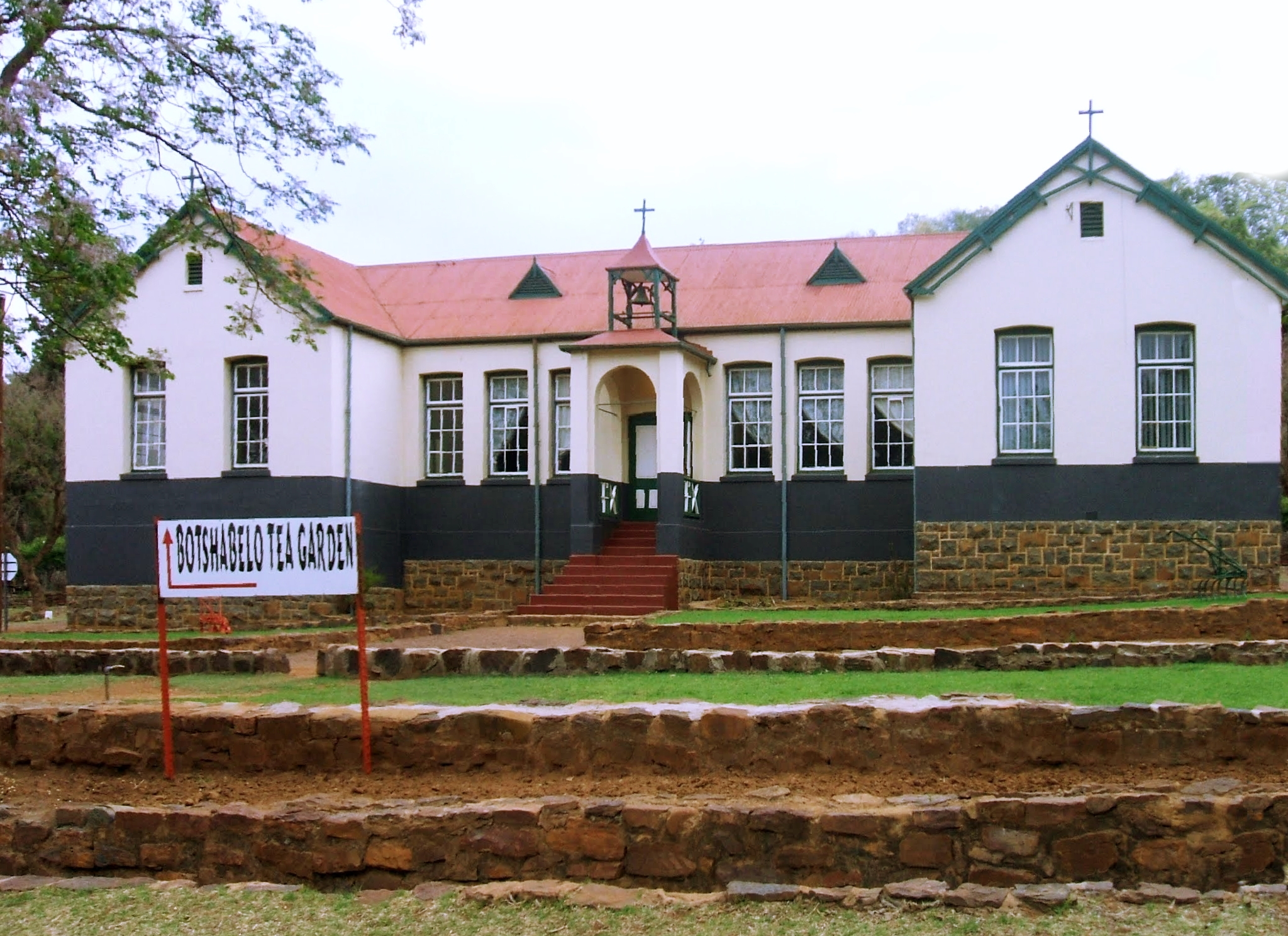
Tea garden Botshabelo

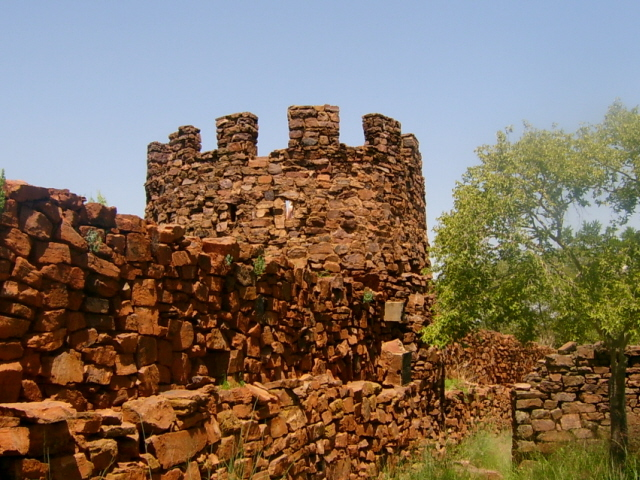
Fort Merensky

== Notable people ==
- Hans Merensky
- Johannes August Winter
- Esther Mahlangu
- Gerard Sekoto
- Abraham Serote (grandfather of Mongane Wally Serote)
- Ken Gampu (received part of his education at Botshabelo)
