= Gerard Sekoto =

South African artist and musician (1913–1993)

- Born: 9 December 1913; Botshabelo, near Middelburg, Eastern Transvaal
- Died: 20 March 1993 (aged 79); Paris, France
- Known for: Painting, Music
- Movement: urban black, social realism

Gerard Sekoto OIG (9 December 1913 – 20 March 1993), was a South African artist and musician. He is recognised as a pioneer of urban black art and social realism. His work was exhibited in Paris, Stockholm, Venice, Washington, and Senegal, as well as in South Africa.

== Early life ==
Sekoto was born on 9 December 1913 at the Lutheran Mission Station in Botshabelo, near Middelburg, Eastern Transvaal (now known as Mpumalanga). He was the son of Andreas Sekoto, a leading member of new Christian converts. Sekoto learned at Wonderhoek, which was established by his father, a priest and teacher. As the son of a missionary, he experienced music as a part of his life and was introduced to the family harmonium at an early age.

As a child, Sekoto would draw with chalk, paper, and colored pencils. His art skills emerged in his teenage years, when he attended the Diocesan Teachers Training College in Pietersburg. This school, unlike most, featured drawing classes and other craftwork. Grace Dieu had a number of skilled woodcarvers producing sculptures on commission as well as for competitions such as the annual South African Academy exhibition. The sculptor Ernest Mancoba was a close friend of Sekoto's at Grace Dieu, and the two dreamed of going to Europe to attend art school. Ernest Mancoba was also his mentor who encouraged Sekoto to pursue a career in art. Sekoto, though, never fit within the paternalistic, prescribed sculpting style at Grace Dieu, preferring to paint and draw on his own.

Graduating as a teacher from the Diocesan Teachers Training College in Pietersburg he taught at a local school, Khaiso Secondary, for four years. During this time he entered an art competition (the May Esther Bedford) organised by the Fort Hare University, for which he was awarded second prize. George Pemba was awarded the first prize. Sekoto had a secret passion for doing art, but was divided between his love for teaching and art. He would hide his work whenever anyone came near it, and would only show his work to his closest friends. He only let Louis Makenna, Nimrod Ndebele, and Ernest Mancoba look at his paintings.

In 1938 at the age of 25 he left for Johannesburg to pursue a career as an artist. He lived with relatives in Gerty Street, Sophiatown. He held his first solo exhibition in 1939. In 1940 the Johannesburg Art Gallery purchased one of his pictures; it was to be the first picture painted by a black artist to enter a museum collection. In 1942 he moved to District Six in Cape Town, where he lived with the Manuel family. Here he apparently met George Pemba (1912–2001), (qv.) who was visiting from Port Elizabeth. In 1945 he moved to Eastwood, Pretoria. During this time, Sekoto lived with his mother, stepfather, and brother. It has been said that some of Sekoto's most beloved work is from this time, and has been deemed "the golden years of his art", the reason being that this was the last body of work he completed in South Africa, before going to Paris.

== Exile ==
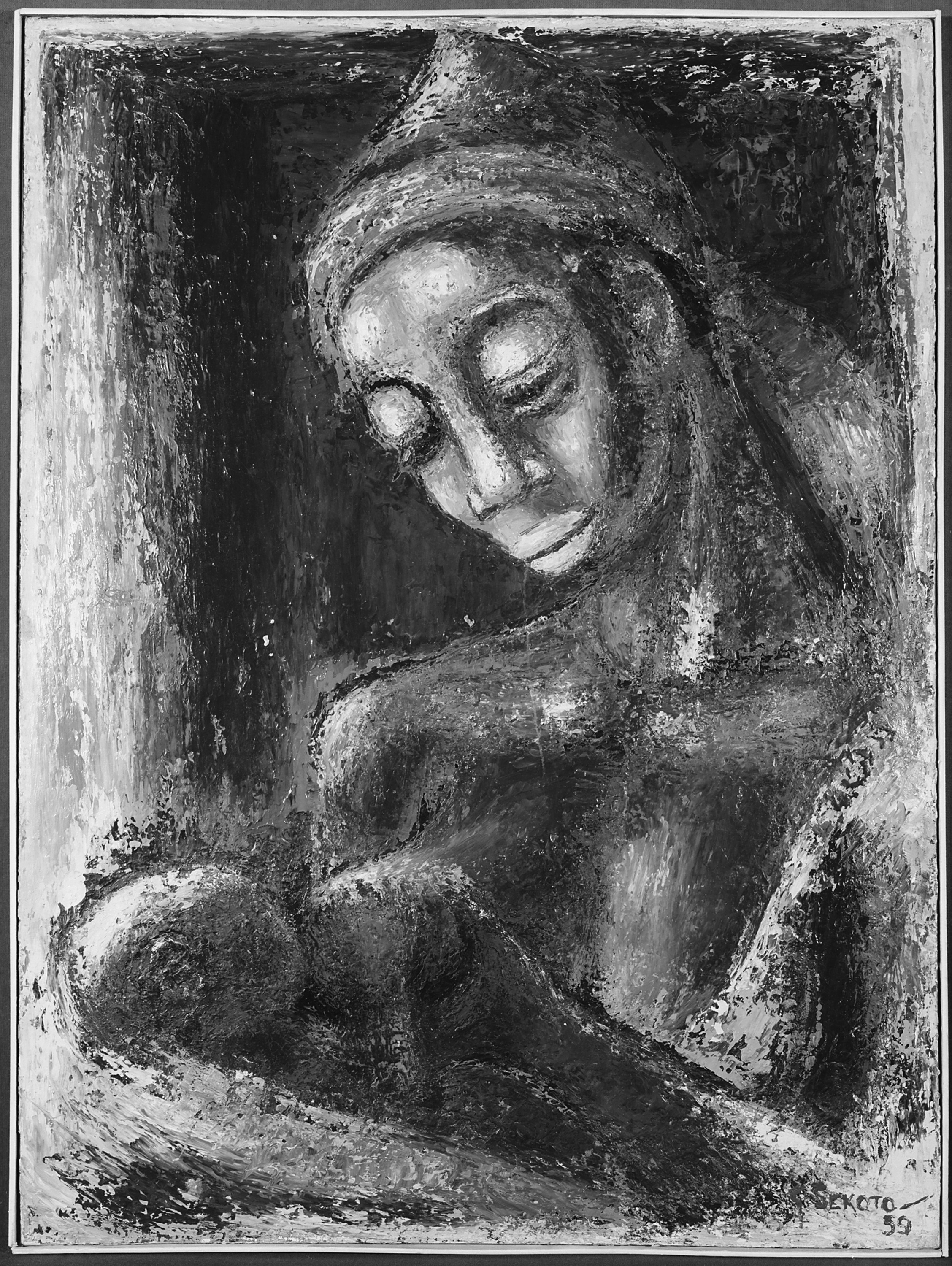
" Mother and Child", 1959

In 1947 he left South Africa to live in Paris under self-imposed exile. It is said that when Sekoto departed from South Africa, the people that were familiar with his work felt a great loss from him leaving. The first years in Paris were hard, and Sekoto was employed as a pianist purely by chance at l'Echelle de Jacob ("Jacob’s ladder"), a trendy nightclub that had reopened for business after World War II. Here he played jazz and sang "Negro spirituals", popular French songs of the period and some Harry Belafonte. Music became the way that he could pay his living and art school expenses.

During his time in Paris, Sekoto was interviewed by a man named Noel Chabani Manganyi. Manganyi describes Sekoto as being ''life-loving'', and states that ''The Genius of Gerard Sekoto remains wide open''.

Between 1956 and 1960, several of Sekoto's compositions were published by Les Editions Musicales. Sekoto played piano and sang on several records. He composed 29 songs, mostly excessively poignant, recalling the loneliness of exile, yet displaying the inordinate courage of someone battling to survive in a foreign cultural environment. In 1966 he visited Senegal for a year.

== Artworks ==
Profile (1960)

It has been stated that Sekoto was a pioneer for South African artists. One way that Sekoto has impacted South Africa is through the social perspective provided through his artworks. One author states, "these pioneer artists gave prominence to the sociological circumstances of the urban black, and that they were indeed the first artists to introduce the human situation into South African art from this perspective".

During his exile in Paris, Sekoto did many drawings and photography. His drawings depict the places he visited and moved too during this time in his life. The photographs he captured were black and white and are of himself playing the guitar or piano.

Sekoto's artwork is displayed in the following galleries:

- Johannesburg Art Gallery
- Pretoria Art Gallery
- University of South Africa Art Gallery
- South African National Gallery
- Cape Town William Humphreys Museum
- William Humphreys Art Gallery, Kimberley
- Gallery Guildhall
- Municipal Collection of the City of Paris
- Philadelphia Museum of Art
- The Gallery at Hayling

== Well-known works by year ==
- 1939
  - "Poverty in the midst of Plenty" - Watercolour and pastel on brown paper
  - "Interior Sophiatown"
  - "Lutheran Church at Botshabelo"
- 1940
  - "Migrant Workers" - Gouache on paper
  - "Yellow Houses"
  - "The Soccer Game"
- 1942
  - "Interior with Woman" - Oil on canvas
  - "Three Women"
  - "Three figures with Bicycle Sophiatown" - Oil on canvas board
  - "The Miners"
  - "Cyclists in Sophiatown"
- 1944
  - "Prison Yard"
- 1945
  - "The Wine Drinker"
  - "Prisoners Carrying a Boulder"
  - "Portrait of Cape Coloured School Teacher - Omar"
  - "Children Playing"
  - "Houses: District Six"
  - ''The Gossips'' - Signed watercolour on paper
- 1946
  - "Women and Child - Eastwood Pretoria"
- 1947
  - "Mine Boy - Oil on canvas board"
  - "Sixpence a Door" - Oil on canvas board
  - "Song of the Pick" - Oil on canvas board
  - "Mary Dikeledi Sekoto"
  - "Self-Portrait"
  - "Portrait of Anna, The Artist's Mother"
  - "Portrait of a Young Man Reading"
  - "Outside the Shop"
  - "Beyond the Gate"
  - "The Donkey Cart, Eastwood"
  - "The Proud Father, Manakedi Naky on Bernard Sekoto's Knee"
  - "The Artists Mother and Stepfather at Home in Eastwood"
- 1949
  - "Eye Glasses" - Charcoal on paper
  - "Sore Eye" - Charcoal on paper
  - "The Black Beret" - Charcoal on paper
  - "Paris; Pont Marie"
- 1953
  - "Besotho Women"
- 1955
  - "Woman and Children"
- 1959
  - "Rider on Horseback" - Oil on canvas
- 1960
  - "Blue Head" - Gouache on paper
  - ''Woman's Head'' - Signed gouache/paper
- 1961
  - "Jazz Band" - Oil on board
- 1963
  - "Woman's Head"
  - "Township Gossip"
- 1968
  - "The Three Figures" - Gouache on paper
- 1971
  - "Township Scene"
- 1975
  - "Woman with a Patterned Headscarf"
- 1978
  - "Homage to Steve Biko" - Oil on canvas
- 1979
  - "The Bull" - Oil on canvas
  - "Portrait of Woman" - Oil on canvas board
