= Hans Merensky =

South African geologist, conservationist & philanthropist

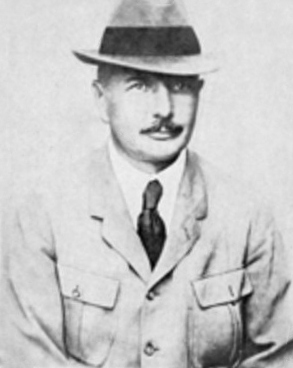
- Hans Merensky (Pietermaritzburg, 1917)
- Born: 16 March 1871; Botshabelo
- Died: 21 October 1952 (aged 81); Duiwelskloof
- Education: University of Charlottenburg
- Known for: Discovering mineral deposits
- Scientific career
- Fields: Geology; Conservation

Hans Merensky (16 March 1871 – 21 October 1952) was a South African geologist, prospector, scientist, conservationist and philanthropist.

== Early life and education ==
Johannes "Hans" Merensky was born on 16 March 1871 at the Berlin Missionary Society's mission station Botshabelo, which was established by his father, the noted German missionary, ethnographer and author, Alexander Merensky. In 1882 the family returned to Germany, where Hans commenced his education. Keenly interested in minerals and enjoying outdoor living, he studied mining geology after finishing his schooling in Germany. He completed his practical training in coal mines in the Saarland and in Silesia and began work for the Department of Mines in East Prussia, but the constraints of civil service did not sit well with him.

== Return to South Africa ==
In 1904 he came to South Africa on study leave, but soon resigned from the German civil service to start his own geology and mining engineering consulting practice.

He did very well from all the consulting work flowing from the post-Second Boer War mining boom, mainly identifying and analysing mineral samples, especially for the many German mining industrialists that were based in the Johannesburg area at the time. Some examples of his work include various German reports on new tin deposits found in the Transvaal Colony, and a report on the Premier Diamond Mine, where the Cullinan Diamond was found, but in 1905 he made a name for himself by exposing the infamous Lecomte Madagascar Gold Concession "oberfaul" (fraud). Other papers from this period include:

- The Gold Deposits of the Murchison Range in the North-East Transvaal (1905)
- The Origin of the River Diamonds Within the Area of the Vaal (1907)
- The Rocks Belonging to the Area of the Bushveld Granite Complex in Which Tin May Be Expected, with Descriptions of the Deposits Actually Found (1908)
- The Diamond Deposits of Lüderitzland, German South-West Africa (1909)

He was admitted to both the Geological Society of South Africa and the South African Association for the Advancement of Science.

== Insolvency and war ==
Even though Merensky's consulting work was a financial success, he started trading speculatively on the stock market, not just for his own account, but also for local and German friends and family. Initially he earned substantial trading profits for himself and others, but eventually lost it all and was declared insolvent in 1913. The next decade, his 40s, would prove to be extremely challenging for him, starting with World War I (1914–1918), which, due to his Prussian Army background, he spent in a concentration camp near Pietermaritzburg. He also became seriously ill during his internment, and it took some time after his release in 1919 to recuperate, but the post-war depression and the destruction of the German economy meant that mining consulting work was scarce and he still had loads of debt from his speculative trading days. In short, at the age of 52, he regarded himself as a total failure.

== Platinum ==
His prospects were about to improve, however, with the first major discovery of platinum in the Bushveld Complex by alluvial gold miner A.F. Lombaard in June 1924, when he was panning in a river bed on the farm Maandagshoek in the Lydenburg district. Lombaard's brother-in-law, H.C. Dunne, sent the sample to Merensky, who had it confirmed as platinum by a company in Johannesburg. Merensky, who recognised the significance of the sample, immediately started raising funds for prospecting, forming the Lydenburg Platinum Syndicate. Within three days they succeeded in determining platinum in a pyroxenite and associated ultrabasic rocks on the farms Mooihoek and Maandagshoek. By early September 1924 they had discovered the famous Merensky Reef, tracing it over many kilometers whilst procuring the necessary surface area mining rights and options for the L.P. Syndicate. Despite the reef extending some 300 kilometeres and being the largest discovered platinum deposit in the world, Merensky made just enough money to settle his debts – and pay for a well-deserved holiday in Germany in 1926.

== Diamonds ==
Towards the end of 1926 he found himself in London, and somehow got word of diamonds having been discovered on the Namaqualand coast by one Jack Carstens. When he arrived there in December 1926, more than a thousand prospectors had already flooded the area, with diamonds having been found all along the coastline from the Buffels River to the Orange River. He managed to negotiate the acquisition of 23 carefully identified claims in the name of a new syndicate, the Hans Merensky Association, of which he owned 50%. In January 1927 the first diamond was found by one of his prospectors, with many more following, in large sizes and of high quality. Merensky had finally achieved financial success after years of struggling, selling his stake to the Oppenheimer-Barnato Group for more than a million pounds. As De Beers' Sir Ernest Oppenheimer quipped, "You won't often meet a man who comes in with sixpence in his pocket and leaves with a million pounds."

== Westfalia ==
Boosted by the new war chest of capital, Merensky turned his focus towards agriculture. First he purchased the Westfalia estate near Duiwelskloof from Sir Lionel Phillips, the mining magnate and politician, adding adjacent farms until the total area constituted more than 5,000 hectares. By focussing on conservation, forestry and fruit farming, especially citrus and avocado, the estate became a successful model, trading successfully to the present day as Westfalia Fruit, owned by the Hans Merensky Foundation. Later he added Kalkfontein near Warmbaths, Rietbokspruit near Letsitele, and Vlakpoort near Northam. He also built a land portfolio in Germany, consisting of Rodenwalde (Mecklenburg), Suesswinkel (Breslau) and Gutzmin (Pommere). These were all forfeited to East Germany after World War II, but the Merensky Trust managed to extract a measure of compensation.

== Gold, chrome and vermiculite ==
As long ago as 1908 Merensky had become interested in gold, particularly in Northeastern Transvaal. In 1930 he assisted a geophysicist from Germany, Dr. Rudolph Krahmann, with his analysis of West Rand gold seams, which lead to the establishment of various gold mines on the West Wits line, as well as the exploration of Orange Free State, Klerksdorp and Evander. He did not derive much personal benefit from gold, however, but made important contributions to the development of the industry.

During his platinum prospecting experience in the Bushveld, he had gained a lot of information about the possible deposits of chrome, procuring various options to acquire land. In 1937 he exercised one such option, buying the farm Jagdlust 418 K.S., 80 kilometers southeast of Pietersburg, where an extremely rich seam of chrome oxide was discovered and developed. A neighbouring farm, Wintersveld, was added shortly thereafter, with both properties eventually sold to Union Carbide.

That same year he also heard from an acquaintance, Max Rhu, that an old prospector had come across an extensive deposit of high quality vermiculite near Phalaborwa, which Merensky then developed into one of the largest and richest in the world and mining it with his Transvaal Ore Company.

== Scientific research and academic funding ==
Besides his geological advisory work, prospecting and agricultural initiatives, Merensky also funded various scientific research and academic pursuits during his life, for example:

- The Obst-Kaiser Expedition to analyse sea levels and rainfall;
- A solar irradiance study to determine the effect of sunlight on human, plant and animal life;
- A chair of Forestry and the Physics building at the University of Stellenbosch;
- The Merensky Library at the University of Pretoria;
- Merensky High School / Agricultural Academy outside Tzaneen.

== Retirement and phosphates ==
In 1940, with the outbreak of World War II, Merensky retired to his farm, Westfalia, instead of once again being sent to an internment camp at his advanced age. After the war, aged 75, he still had the energy and drive to establish a camp near Phalaborwa and supervise the prospecting and drilling of phosphate deposits. The Government eventually purchased the claims, thus establishing the Phosphate Development Corporation (Foskor) to mine and process the deposit. After this final commercial achievement, Merensky returned to his farm for good, increasingly struggling with his health and hearing. He set up and endowed the Hans Merensky Trust, later named the Merensky Foundation, in order to complete open projects and to keep developing South Africa's natural and human resources.

== Personal life ==
Merensky was by all accounts rather introverted and never married, associating mainly with German-speaking friends and acquaintances. He died peacefully in his sleep on 21 October 1952. In line with his wishes, he was cremated and his ashes were scattered on Rosendal, Westfalia.

== Recognition and legacy ==
- Merensky is widely regarded as the greatest prospector and analyst of mineral deposits in South Africa's history. His many contributions were based on his deep geological knowledge, strong powers of observation and academic thoroughness.
- Technische Hochschule of Berlin: Honorary Doctorate in engineering
- University of Stellenbosch: Honorary Doctorate
- University of Pretoria: Honorary Doctorate
- David Draper Medal of the Geological Society of South Africa
- Leibnitz Medal of the Prussian Academy of Sciences
