= Hermann Theodor Wangemann =

German Lutheran theologian and missionary

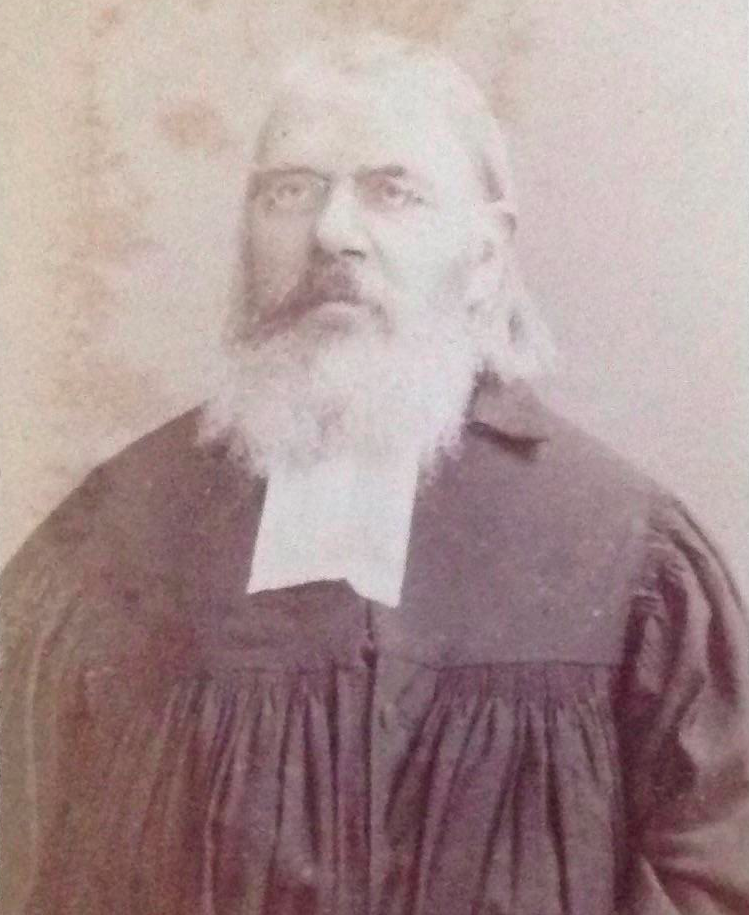
- Born: 27 March 1818; Wilsnack, Brandenburg
- Died: 18 June 1894 (aged 76); Berlin
- Education: University of Halle
- Occupations: Theologian, Missionary

Hermann Theodor Wangemann (27 March 1818 – 18 June 1894) was a German theologian and missionary.

== Biography ==
=== Early life ===
Wangemann's father, Johannes Theodosius, arrived with his family in Demmin in Pomerania around 1821, where he became a subrector and later received the title of music director. Hermann Theodor attended the town school here, followed by the Gymnasium in Berlin from 1832 to 1836. After studying theology at the University of Berlin, Wangemann first held a position as a house teacher in Bern from 1840 to 1844. During this time he was awarded a doctorate in theology by the University of Halle. From 1845 he worked as a rector and assistant teacher in Wollin, Farther Pomerania (Hinterpommern).

=== Berlin Missionary Society ===
After becoming a seminary director and Archidiakon in Cammin in 1849, he was actively involved in the Erweckungsbewegung (revival movement). From 1858 he edited the monthly magazine for the Protestant Lutheran Church of Prussia. In 1865 he was appointed director of the Berlin Missionary Society, one of four German Protestant mission societies active in 19th and 20th century South Africa. From 1866 onwards Wangemann visited the mission offices in Africa and was editor of the Berlin Mission reports. In his book Maleo und Sekukuni – Ein Lebensbild aus Südafrika, he describes his first journey (1866–67) through the territory of the Berlin Missionary Society in South Africa. A second journey followed in 1884–85 to celebrate the golden jubilee of the first Berlin Mission Society station in South Africa at Bethanie. The mission station Wangemannshöh in German East Africa was named after him.

=== Marriage ===
Wangemann married three times during his life. His first wife died during the birth of his daughter Elisabeth, who would eventually marry BMS missionary Johannes Winter, and his second after a prolonged illness, but his third marriage was a long and happy one.

=== Death ===
Wangemann died on 18 June 1894 in Berlin.

== Publications ==
- Ein Reisejahr in Südafrika (1868)
- Maleo und Sekukuni, ein Lebensbild aus Südafrika (1868)
- Lebensbilder aus Südafrika (1871)
- Südafrika und seine Bewohner (1881)
- Ein zweites Reisejahr in Südafrika (1886)
