= Mecklenburg, South Africa =

Mecklenburg
- Location within Limpopo Location within South Africa
- Coordinates: 24.394°S 30.074°E
- Country: South Africa
- Province: Limpopo
- District: Sekhukhune
- Municipality: Fetakgomo Tubatse

Area
  - Total: 5.94 km^{2} (2.29 sq mi)

Population (2001)
  - Total: 1,611
  - Density: 271/km^{2} (702/sq mi)
- Time zone: UTC+2 (SAST)
- Area code: 045

Mecklenburg is a town in Fetakgomo Tubatse Local Municipality in the Limpopo province of South Africa ruled by the Magadimane Ntweng Chiefancy.
