= Bethany, Free State =

Bethany
- Location within Free State (South African province) Location within South Africa
- Coordinates: 29.598°S 25.956°E
- Country: South Africa
- Province: Free State
- District: Xhariep
- Municipality: Kopanong

Government
  - Type: Municipality
  - Mayor: Xolile Mathwa (ANC)
- Time zone: UTC+2 (SAST)

Bethany is a former station of the Berlin Missionary Society (BMW) established in 1834 by Gebel and Kraul to serve the Korana. Hebrew for 'house of misery'. The railway station was renamed Wurasoord in 1919, after Carl Wuras, a BMS missionary who took charge of it then.
