= Berlin Missionary Society =

The Berlin Missionary Society (BMS) (German: Berliner Missionsgesellschaft (BMG)) was a Berlin-based German Protestant (Lutheran) Christian missionary society, active from 1824 to 1972 in South Africa, East Africa and China. In 1972 it merged with various other societies to become today's Berliner Missionswerk.

== Founding ==
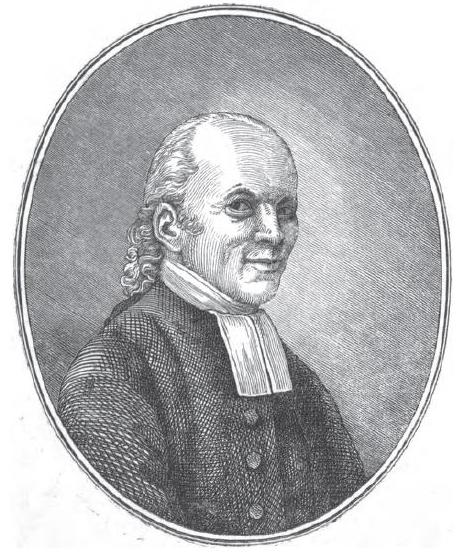
Pastor Johannes Jaenicke

The precursor to the BMS, Gesellschaft zur Beförderung der Evangelischen Missionen unter den Heiden ("Society for the Advancement of the Evangelical Mission among the Heathen"), was founded on 29 February 1824 by a group of eleven pious laymen from the Prussian nobility, with the initial primary aim of raising funding for the training of missionaries.

It was a successor organisation to the Berliner Missionsschule ("Berlin Missionary School"), started in 1800 by Pastor Johannes Jaenicke of the Bohemian-Lutheran congregation in Berlin, to train missionaries for societies such as the London Missionary Society.

== South Africa ==
The Berlin Missionary Society was one of four German Protestant mission societies active in South Africa before 1914. It emerged from the German tradition of Pietism after 1815 and sent its first missionaries to South Africa in 1834. There were few positive reports in the early years, but it was especially active 1859–1914. It was especially strong in the Boer Republics. World War I cut off contact with Germany, but the missions continued at a reduced pace. After 1945 the missionaries had to deal with the decolonisation of Africa and especially with the apartheid government. At all times the BMS emphasized spiritual inwardness, and puritanical values such as morality, hard work and self-discipline. It proved unable to speak and act decisively against injustice and racial discrimination and was disbanded in 1972.

=== Free State and Northern Cape ===
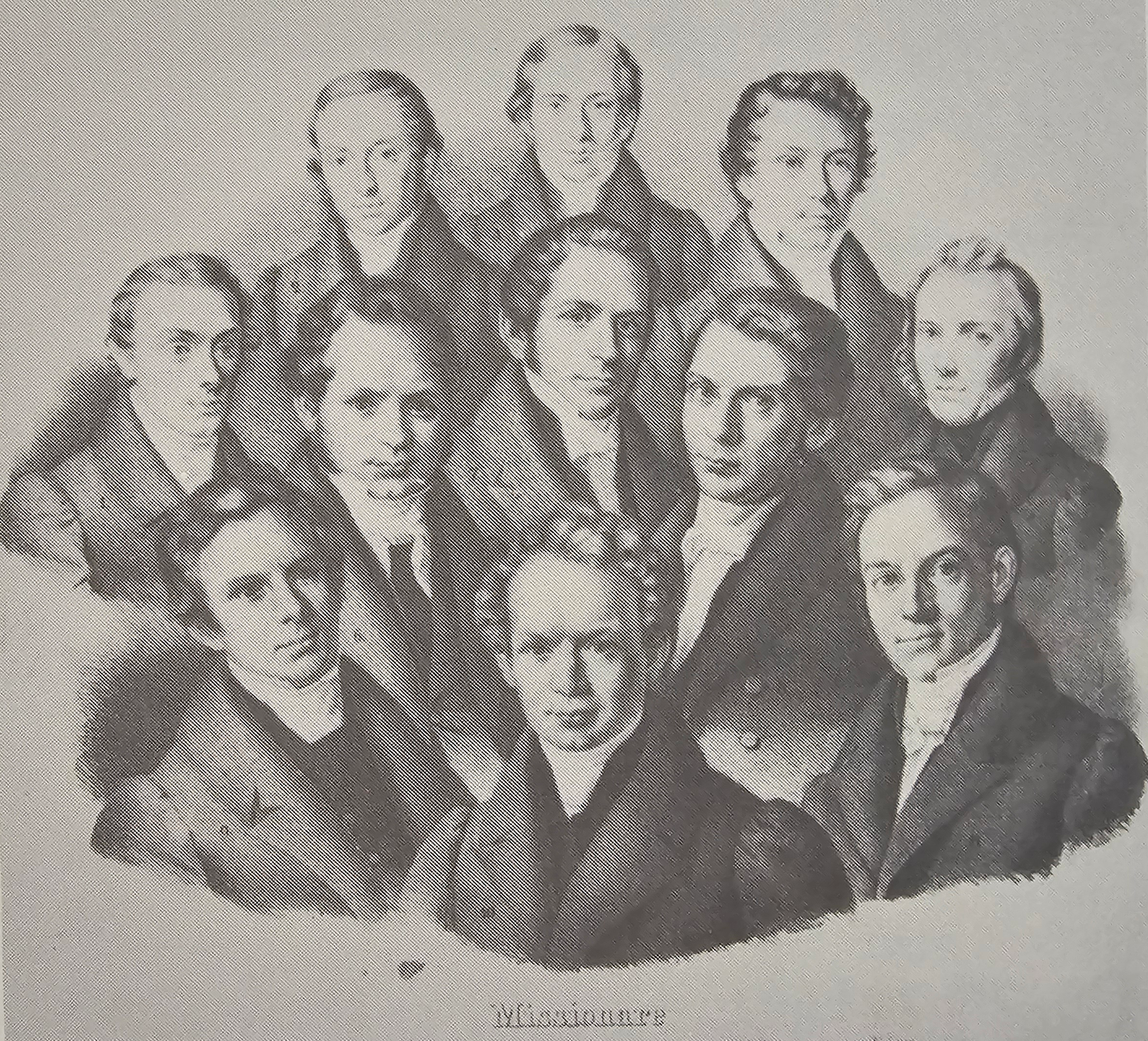
Left to right row by row. 1. Gustav Adolf Kraut 2. Reinhold Theodor Gregorowski 3. August Ferdinand Lange 4. Johannes Schmidt 5. August Gebel 6. Adolph Albert Ortlepp 7. Carl Lorentz Theordor Radloff 8. Johann August Ludwig Zerwick 9. Carl Friedrich Wuras 10. Carl Robert Lange 11. Jacob Ludwig Döhne

The BMS began the training of its first missionaries in 1829, with assistance from missionary societies in Pomerania and East Prussia. The first five, August Gebel, Johann Schmidt, Reinhold Gregorowski, Gustav Kraut and August F. Lange, were sent to South Africa in 1883 to establish the first BMS mission station, Bethanien (Bethany), in the Orange Free State.

Missionaries with ties to Berlin had been working there with the London Missionary Society and Rhenish Missionary Society, making South Africa an obvious choice, with the initial objective being to set up a mission to the Tswana. Upon arriving in the southern Free State, and on advice from the London Mission Society's G.A. Kolbe at Philippolis, it was decided instead to establish a mission amongst the Korana at a spot on the Riet River, which they named Bethanien, in September 1834. From Bethanien missionaries founded a station at Pniel on the Vaal River in 1845, which would be at the centre of South Africa's diamond discoveries in 1869–70.

=== Eastern Cape and Natal ===
Further missionaries arrived in 1836–7, with Jacob Ludwig Döhne setting up BMS stations Bethel and Itemba amongst the Xhosa in a part of the Eastern Cape then known as Kaffraria. Other stations followed but on-going frontier conflict was a constraint. During the Frontier War of 1846 to 1847, these stations were abandoned and the missionaries sought safety in the neighbouring British colony of Natal.

Missionaries Karl Wilhelm Posselt and Wilhelm Güldenpfennig founded the first BMS station in Natal which they named Emmaus, with further stations being established in the years that followed, including the Christianenberg and Hermannsburg Missions.

=== South African Republic/Transvaal ===
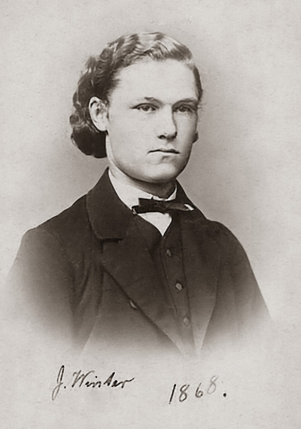
J.A. Winter

Missionaries Alexander Merensky and Heinrich Grützner started work in the northeastern part of the South African Republic in 1860, their first station being at Gerlachshoop on the farm Rietkloof – named after Prussian army general Leopold von Gerlach, one of the founders of the BMS. There were unsuccessful early attempts to evangelise the Swazi and in Sekhukhuneland. Merensky sought refuge amongst his Christian converts in the Middelburg district and founded the station at Botshabelo (“city of refuge”) in 1865 – which soon became the most important station of the Berlin Society in South Africa. Here were established a school, seminary, workshops, mill and printing press; and from here BMS influence spread throughout the Transvaal. In 1880 BMS missionary Johannes Winter established a mission station at Thaba Mosego, the vanquished capital of the Pedi king, Sekhukhune, who had been defeated the year before by an army of British, Boer and Swazi soldiers. In 1889 a prominent native evangelist, Martinus Sewushane, and around 500 of his followers decided to secede from the Berlin Missionary Society and form the Lutheran Bapedi Church (LBC), asking Winter to join them. By 1900 there were more than thirty-six stations and nearly 30,000 converts in the region. The Berlin missionaries in South Africa, particularly Alexander Merensky, Carl Knothe, Gustav Trümpelmann, Paul Schwellnus and Gustav Eiselen, contributed to the study of African languages, producing Bible translations and hymnals.

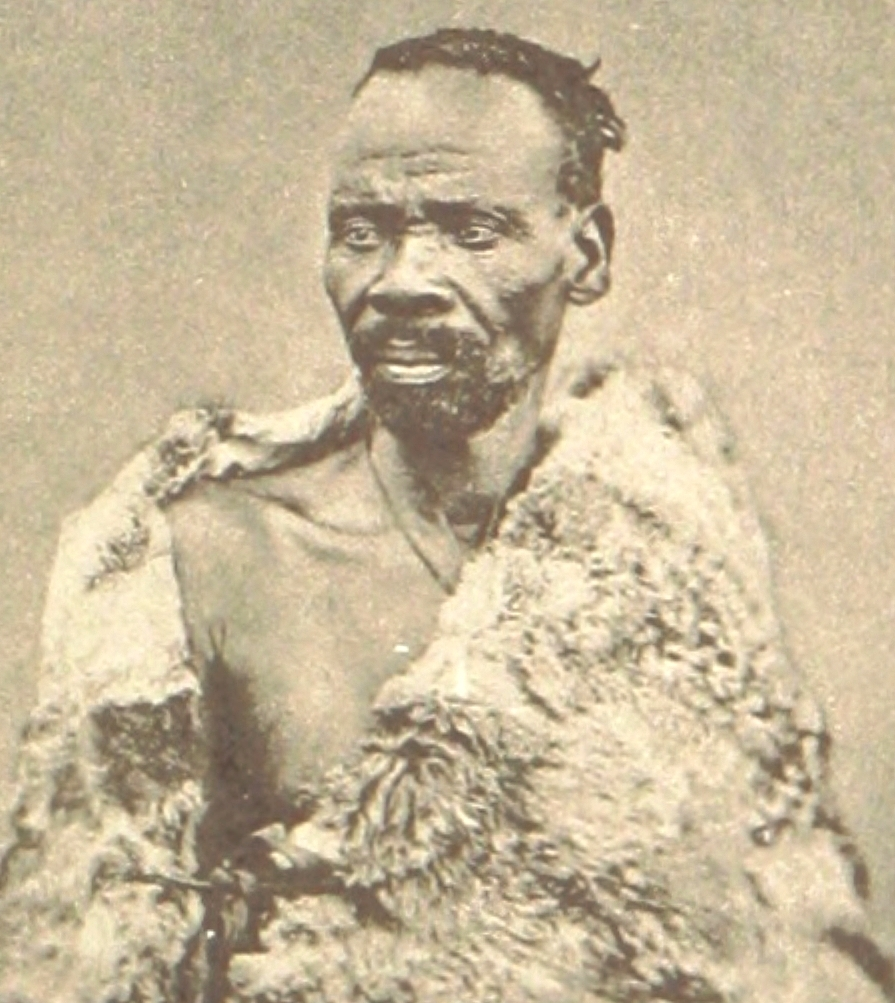
Sekhukhune

It was at Botshabelo that Trümpelmann, with the invaluable assistance of his erstwhile student, Abraham Serote, translated the Bible into Sepedi (Northern Sotho). The publication in 1904 by the British and Foreign Bible Society of this combined effort was the first complete Bible in an indigenous language. Their work was interrupted by the Anglo Boer War, during which BMS missionary Daniel Heese was murdered by members of the Bushveldt Carbineers, an irregular regiment of the British Army.

Both World Wars, when access to funding became severely limited, caused even greater disruption. Moreover, after World War II the Society's Berlin headquarters fell within the Soviet Zone of Occupied Germany. In 1961 the BMS established a branch in West Berlin, which remained in contact with its only remaining missionary field, namely in South Africa, for the next 28 years. However, from 1962 it began granting independence to its mission churches which, in time, became amalgamated with other Lutheran mission churches in the region and formed the Evangelical Lutheran Church in Southern Africa.

=== Nationalhelferen ===
The BMS focused on providing schooling and bringing the gospel to people in their own language. Hence the Society's missionaries were often at the forefront of publishing Bible translations, dictionaries and grammars in indigenous languages. It was as part of this process that Africans, duly trained and sometimes salaried, were accepted into the Society as teachers, catechists and lay-preachers, the so-called Nationalhelferen or national helpers.

The Tswana Catechist Richard Miles was an early example of an indigenous person fulfilling this role at the Mission Station at Bethanie in the Southern Free State. Miles traveled to the interior with the missionary party in 1835.

Niklaas Koen, a “Khoikhoi”, was sent by the BMS to Germany in 1875 to further his education at a high school at Ducherow in Pomerania and afterwards to study for the ministry at the Berlin Missionshaus, where he adopted a German version of his name, Klaus Kuhn. Kuhn qualified as a missionary (he also took lessons as a violinist) and, after becoming engaged to a German woman, Maria Brose, returned to Africa to the mission station Königsberg in Natal – where he married his bride in 1878.

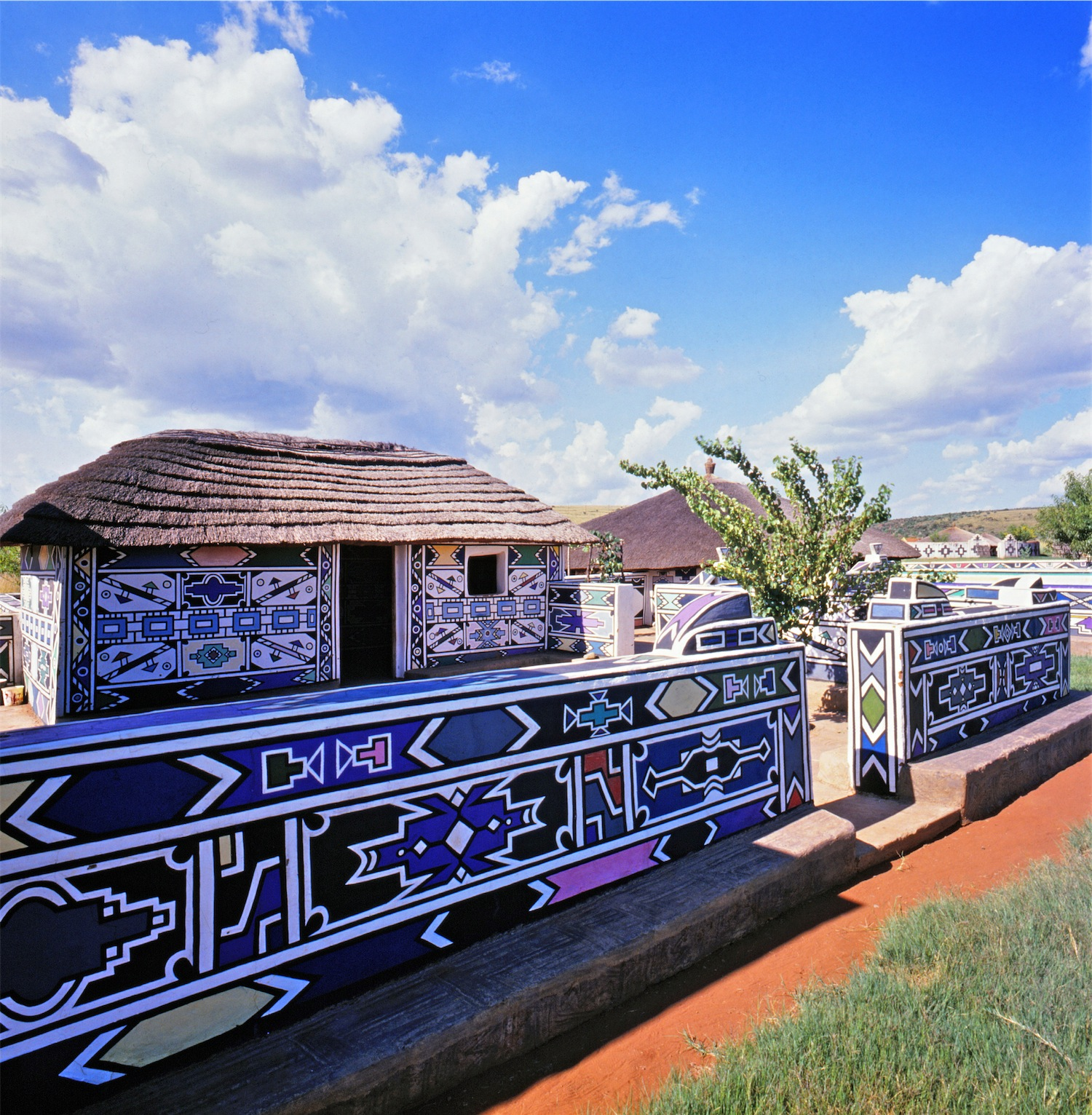
Botshabelo

Another gifted African student who had started out with violin lessons and was to follow in Kuhn's footsteps to Ducherow and then the theological seminary in Berlin was one Jan Sekoto. Apparently not adapting well to the Pomeranian climate, however, he returned early to the BMS station at Botshabelo as a teacher. Sekoto's son Gerard Sekoto, born at Botshabelo in 1913, would later emigrate to Europe, obtaining French citizenship and achieving considerable renown as an artist.

== China ==
The BMS also sent workers to China in 1869 during the late Qing Dynasty, but it was not before 1882 that the Society officially declared Canton as its mission field, inheriting a station of the Rhenish Mission. A second missionary field in China arose after Germany declared Shandong to be within their sphere of political and colonial influence in 1896.

Later the BMS in China merged with the German East Asia Mission (German: Deutsche Ostasienmission), which in 1972 was integrated into the still existing Berlin Missionary Endowment (Berliner Missionswerk). The latter keeps well established ties with the Presbyterian Church in the Republic of Korea (est. 1953) and the Presbyterian Church in Taiwan and co-operates with the United Church of Christ in Japan and the Church of Christ in China.

=== See also ===
- List of Protestant missionary societies in China (1807–1953)
- Timeline of Chinese history
- Protestant missions in China 1807–1953
- List of Protestant missionaries in China
- Christianity in China

== East Africa ==
The Bethel Mission had established a missionary presence in Tanganyika, German East Africa, inviting the BMS in 1903 to take over a number of its stations. These missions declined after World War I (when Germany lost all its colonies and German missionaries in such areas were deemed undesirable) and their work was impossible after World War II.

== Notable Leadership ==
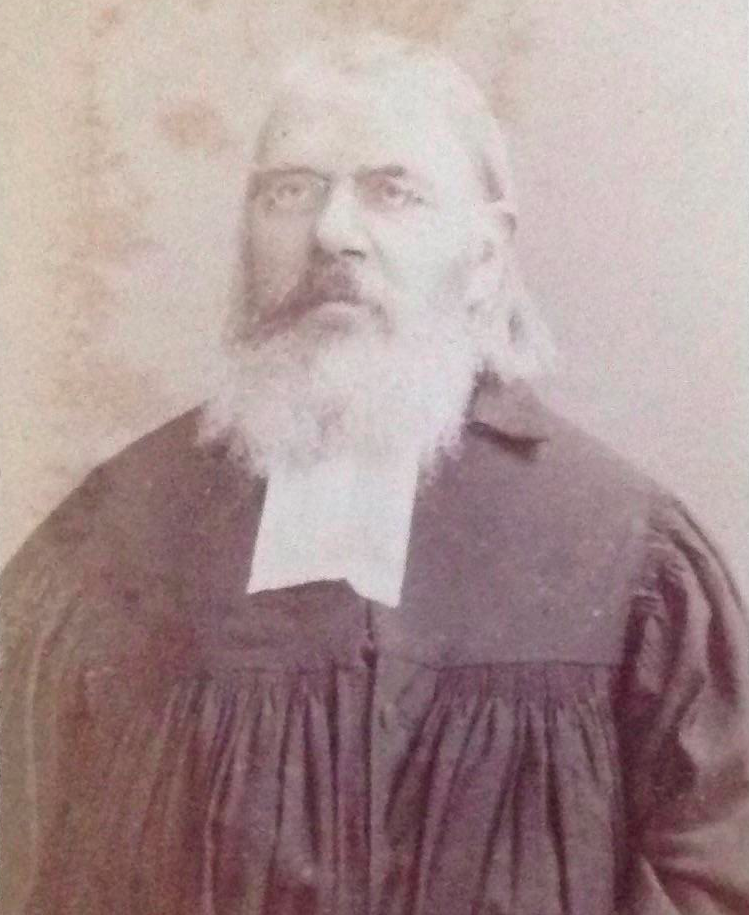
H.T. Wangemann

Hermann Theodor Wangemann directed the Society from 1865 until his death in 1894. He first traveled to South Africa shortly after becoming director and went a second time in 1884. He wrote a system of regulations addressing fundamental questions of missionary work, the 1881 Missionsordnung der Gesellschaft zur Beförderung der Evangelischen Missionen unter den Heiden zu Berlin.
