= Pedi people =

Sotho-Tswana ethnic group of northeast South Africa

Bapedi

Total population
- 4,379,000

Regions with significant populations
- South Africa: 4,185,000 (7% of population)
- Botswana: Not stated

Languages
- First language Northern Sotho (Sepedi); Second language English, Afrikaans, other South African Bantu languages

Religion
- Christianity, African traditional religion

Related ethnic groups
- Lobedu people, Sotho people, Tswana people, Pulana people, Lozi people, Kgalagadi people, Tlôkwa people, and other Sotho-Tswana peoples

Pedi
- Person: Mopedi
- People: Bapedi
- Language: Sepedi
- Country: Bopedi

The Pedi (/pɛdi/ or Bapedi /bæˈpɛdi/) are a Sotho-Tswana ethnic group native to South Africa, who speak Sepedi, one of the 12 official languages in South Africa. They are primarily situated in Limpopo and Gauteng.

The Pedi people are part of the Bantu language group. Their common ancestors, along with the Sotho and Tswana, migrated from East Africa to South Africa no later than the 7th century CE. Over time, they emerged as a distinct people between the 15th and 18th centuries, with some settling in the northern region of the Transvaal. The Pedi maintained close ties with their relatives and neighboring tribes.

Towards the end of the 18th century, the primary Pedi state was established, led by supreme leaders from the Maroteng clan. In the early 19th century, the Pedi state faced significant challenges from the Nguni, particularly the Northern Ndebele under Mzilikazi and the Swati. A pivotal figure in preserving the Pedi state was Sekwati I (1827–1861), the paramount leader who introduced reforms in the military and internal administration and welcomed Christian missionaries.

After Sekwati I's death, his son Sekhukhune took control but reversed some reforms, including Christianization. From 1876 to 1879, the Pedi engaged in wars with the Boers and the British, resulting in defeat and the Pedi state falling under Boer influence. In 1882, Sekhukhune was assassinated by conspirators, leading to the dismantling of the monarchy and statehood. In 1885, the Transvaal government only allocated a small territory to the Pedi, with the majority of the people living outside of it.

In the 1950s, the Sotho language committee recognized the Pedi language as distinct from Sesotho.

Throughout history, the Pedi actively participated in the struggle against colonization and apartheid in South Africa, joining the broader movement of African peoples fighting for their rights and freedom.

== Name and terminology ==
Rev. Alexander Merensky, a German missionary, had an extensive understanding of the Bapedi tribe, surpassing that of any other European of his time. According to Merensky, Sekhukhune's people were a fusion of various tribes, with the most significant group identifying as the "Bapedi" or "Baperi," meaning the "Family of the King." This tribe had settled along the Steelpoort River nearly two centuries prior, and Merensky found the name of their kingdom, 'Biri,' on antique Portuguese maps.

The origin of the Bapedi name is uncertain, but it may have come from an ancestral figure or the land they inhabited. What is significant is that the tribe founded by Thobela and its various divisions revered the porcupine as their totem and identified as Bapedi.

== History ==
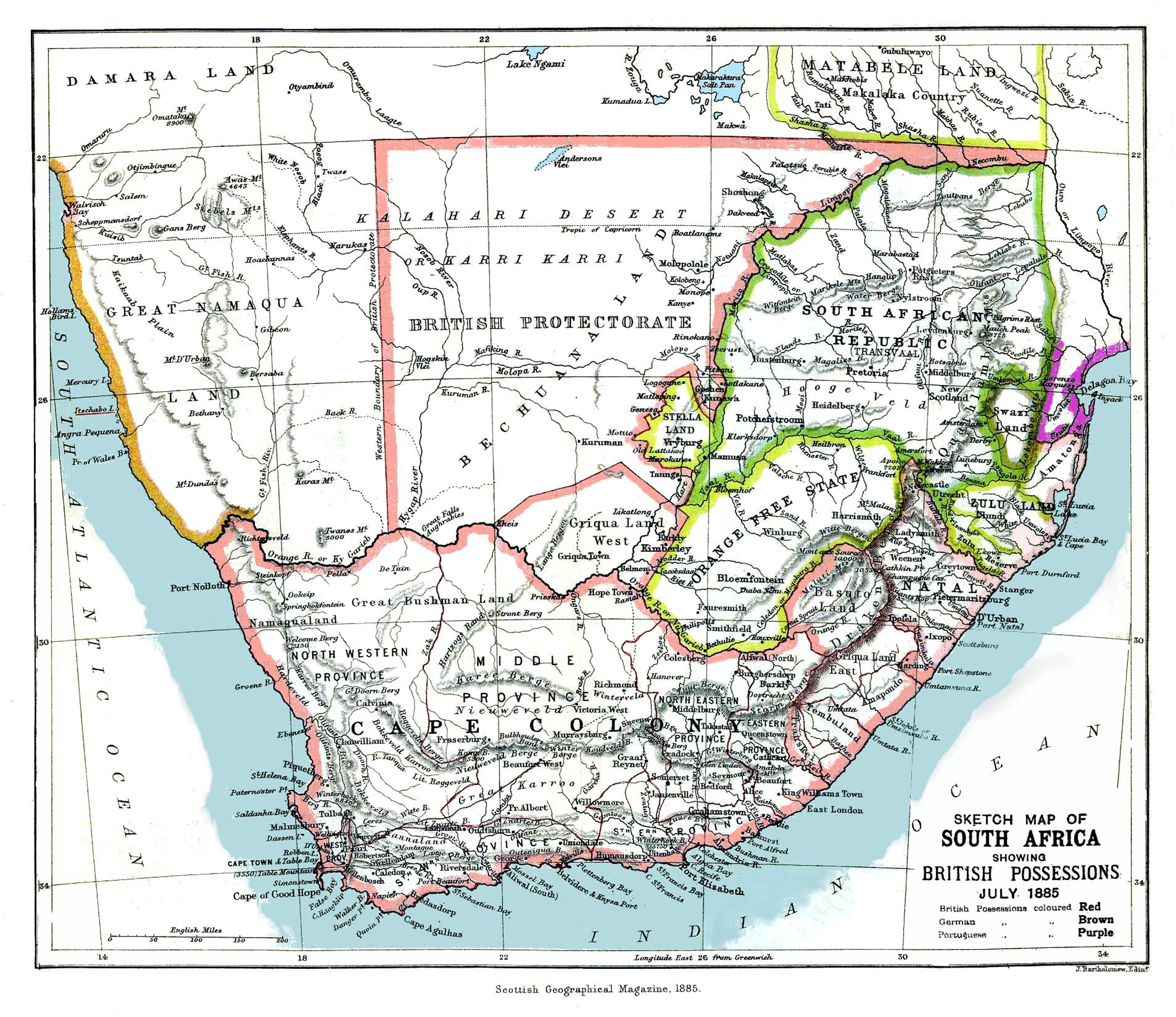
South Africa in 1885

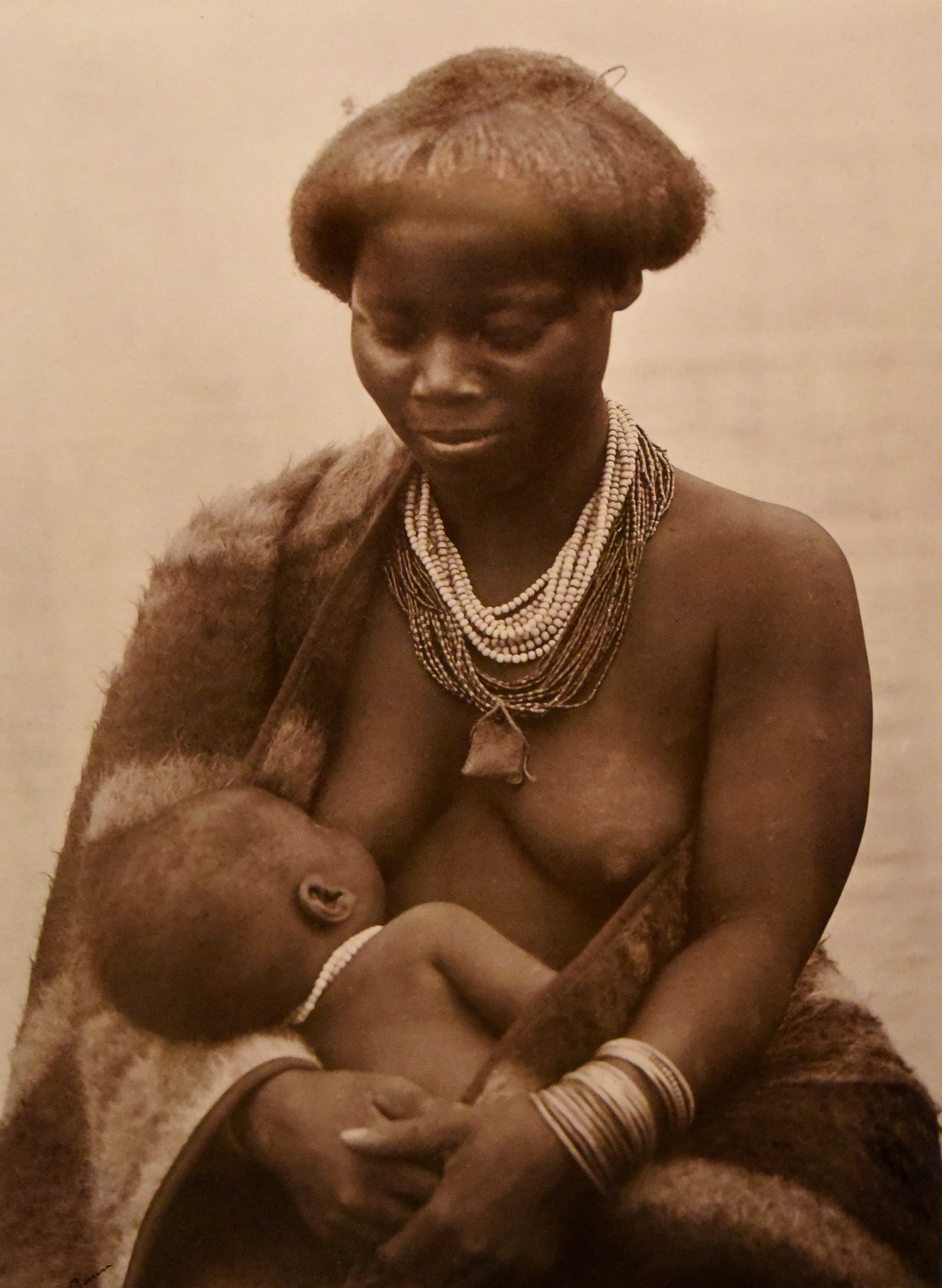
A Pedi woman breastfeeding. Alfred Duggan-Cronin. South Africa, early 20th century. The Wellcome Collection, London.

=== Early history ===
Proto-Sotho people are thought to have migrated south from eastern Africa (around the African Great Lakes) in successive waves spanning five centuries. They made their way along with modern-day western Zimbabwe, with the last group of Sotho speakers, the Hurutse, settling in the region west of Gauteng around the 16th century. The Pedi people originated from the Kgatla offshoot, a group of Tswana speakers. In about 1650, they settled in the area to the south of the Steelpoort River. Over several generations, linguistic and cultural homogeneity developed to a certain degree. Only in the last half of the 18th century did they broaden their influence over the region, establishing the Pedi paramountcy by bringing smaller neighboring chiefdoms under their control.

During migrations in and around this area, groups of people from diverse origins began to concentrate around dikgoro, or ruling nuclear groups. They identified themselves through symbolic allegiances to totemic animals such as tau (lion), kolobe (pig), and kwena (crocodile). The Pedi people show a considerable amount of Khoisan admixture.

=== The Marota Empire/Pedi Kingdom ===
The Pedi polity under King Thulare (c. 1780–1820) was made up of land that stretched from present-day Rustenburg to the lowveld in the west and as far south as the Vaal River. Pedi power was undermined during the Mfecane by Ndwandwe invaders from the south-east. A period of dislocation followed, after which the polity was re-stabilized under Thulare's son, Sekwati.

Sekwati succeeded Thulare as paramount chief of the Pedi in the northern Transvaal (Limpopo) and was frequently in conflict with the Matabele under Mzilikazi and plundered by the Zulu and the Swazi. Sekwati has also engaged in numerous negotiations and struggles for control over land and labor with the Afrikaans-speaking farmers (Boers) who have since settled in the region.

These disputes over land occurred after the founding of Ohrigstad in 1845, but after the town was incorporated into the Transvaal Republic in 1857 and the Republic of Lydenburg was formed, an agreement was reached that the Steelpoort River was the border between the Pedi and the Republic.

The Pedi were well equipped to defend themselves, though, as Sekwati and his heir, Sekhukhune I were able to procure firearms, mostly through migrant labor to the Kimberley diamond fields and as far as Port Elizabeth. The Pedi paramountcy's power was also cemented by the fact that chiefs of subordinate villages, or kgoro, took their principal wives from the ruling house. This system of cousin marriage resulted in the perpetuation of marriage links between the ruling house and the subordinate groups and involved the payment of an inflated magadi, or brideprice mostly in the form of cattle, to the Maroteng house.

=== Swazi campaigns ===
The campaigns against the Pedi were a sequence of military operations undertaken by the Swazi in their endeavors to subjugate the Pedi people. Despite their persistent efforts, the Swazi forces faced significant challenges in conquering the Pedi's formidable mountain fortresses, which served as robust strongholds for the Pedi people. As a consequence of the Swazi's inability to completely overpower the Pedi, some Pedi fugitives successfully reassembled, allowing them to sustain their resistance against the Swazi forces.

=== Sekhukhune wars ===
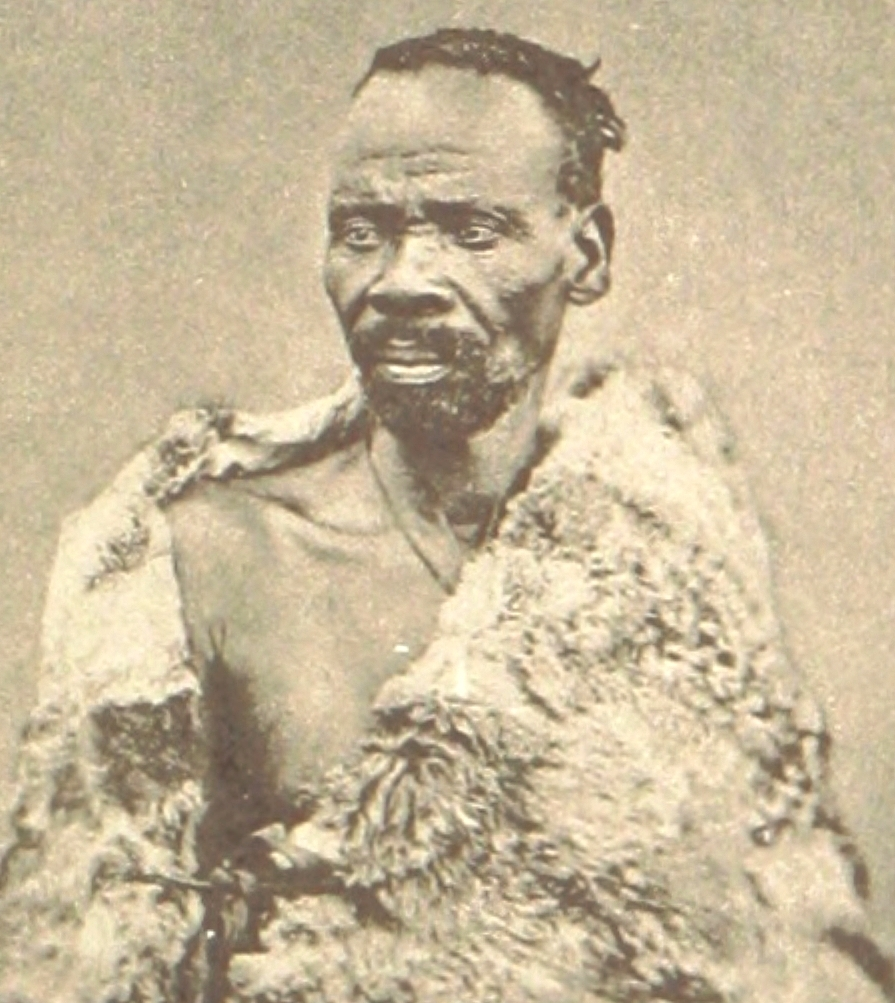
King Sekhukhune, 1881

Sekhukhune I succeeded his father in 1861 and repelled an attack against the Swazi. At the time, there were also border disputes with the Transvaal, which led to the formation of Burgersfort, which was manned by volunteers from Lydenburg. By the 1870s, the Pedi were one of three alternative sources of regional authority, alongside the Swazi and the ZAR (Zuid-Afrikaansche Republiek).

Over time, tensions increased after Sekhukhune refused to pay taxes to the Transvaal government, and the Transvaal declared war in May 1876. It became known as the Sekhukhune War, the outcome of which was that the Transvaal commando's attack failed. After this, volunteers nevertheless continued to devastate Sekhukhune's land and provoke unrest, to the point where peace terms were met in 1877.

Unrest continued, and this became a justification for the British annexing the Transvaal in April 1877 under Sir Theophilus Shepstone. Following the annexation, the British also declared war on Sekhukhune I under Sir Garnet Wolseley, and defeated him in 1879. Sekhukhune was then imprisoned in Pretoria, but later released after the first South African War, when the Transvaal regained independence.

However, soon after his release, Sekhukhune was murdered by his half-brother Mampuru, and because his heir had been killed in the war and his grandson, Sekhukhune II was too young to rule, one of his other half-brothers, Kgoloko, assumed power as regent.

=== Apartheid ===
In 1885, an area of 1,000 square kilometres (390 sq mi) was set aside for the Pedi, known as Geluk Location created by the Transvaal Republic's Native Location Commission. Later, according to apartheid segregation policy, the Pedi would be assigned the homeland of Lebowa.

== Culture ==
=== Totems ===
Like the other Sotho-Tswana groups, the Bapedi people use totems to identify sister clans and kinship. The most widely used totems in Sepedi are as follows:

English	Pedi
Warthog	Kolobesodi
Lion	Tau
Crocodile	Kwena
Porcupine	Noko
Monkey	Kgabo
Buck	Phuthi
Pangolin	Kgaga
Buffalo	Nare
Elephant	Tlou

=== Settlements ===
In pre-conquest times, people settled on elevated sites in relatively large villages, divided into kgoro (pl. dikgoro, groups centered on agnatic family clusters). Each consisted of a group of households in huts built around a central area that served as a meeting place, cattle byre, graveyard, and ancestral shrine. Households' huts were ranked in order of seniority. Each wife of a polygynous marriage had her own round thatched hut, joined to other huts by a series of open-air enclosures (lapa) encircled by mud walls. Older boys and girls, respectively, would be housed in separate huts. Aspirations to live in a more modern style, along with practicality, have led most families to abandon the round hut style for rectangular, flat-tin-roofed houses. Processes of forced and semi-voluntary relocation and an apartheid government planning scheme implemented in the name of "betterment", have meant that many newer settlements and the outskirts of many older ones consist of houses built in grid formation, occupied by individual families unrelated to their neighbors.

=== Politics ===
Kgoshi – a loose collection of kinsmen with related males at its core, was as much a jural unit as a kinship one, since membership was defined by acceptance of the kgoro-head's authority rather than primarily by descent. Royal or chiefly kgoros sometimes underwent rapid subdivision as sons contended for positions of authority.

=== Marriage ===
Marriage was patrilocal. Polygamy was practiced mostly by people of higher, especially chiefly, status. Marriage was preferred with a close or classificatory cousin, especially a mother's brother's daughter, but this preference was most often realized in the case of ruling or chiefly families. Practiced by the ruling dynasty, during its period of dominance, it represented a system of political integration and control over the recycling of bridewealth (dikgomo di boela shakeng; returning of bride cattle). Cousin marriage meant that the two sets of prospective in-laws were closely connected even before the event of a marriage, and went along with an ideology of sibling-linkage, through which the Magadi (bridewealth) procured for a daughter's marriage would, in turn, be used to get a bride for her brother, and he would repay his sister by offering a daughter to her son in marriage. Cousin marriage is still practiced, but less frequently. Polygyny too is now rare, many marriages end in divorce or separation, and a large number of young women remain single and raise their children in small (and often very poor) female-headed households. However, new forms of domestic cooperation have come into being, often between brothers and sisters, or matrilineally linked relatives.

=== Inheritance ===
Previously, the oldest son of a household within a polygynous family would inherit the house-property of his mother, including its cattle, and was supposed to act as custodian of these goods for the benefit of the household's other children. With the decline of cattle-keeping and the sharp increase in land shortages, this has switched to a system of last-born inheritance, primarily of land.

=== Initiation ===
The life cycle for both sexes was differentiated by important rituals. Both girls and boys underwent initiation. Boys (bašemane, later mašoboro) spent their youth looking after cattle at remote outposts in the company of peers and older youths. Circumcision and initiation at koma (initiation school), held about once every five years, socialized youths into groups of cohorts or regiments (mephato) bearing the leader's name, whose members then maintained lifelong loyalty to each other, and often traveled together to find work on the farms or in the mines. Girls attended their own koma and were initiated into their own regiments (ditswa-bothuku), usually two years after the boys. Initiation is still practiced, and provides a considerable income to the chiefs who license it for a fee or, in recent years, to private entrepreneurs who have established initiation schools beyond the chiefs' jurisdiction.

== Music and arts ==
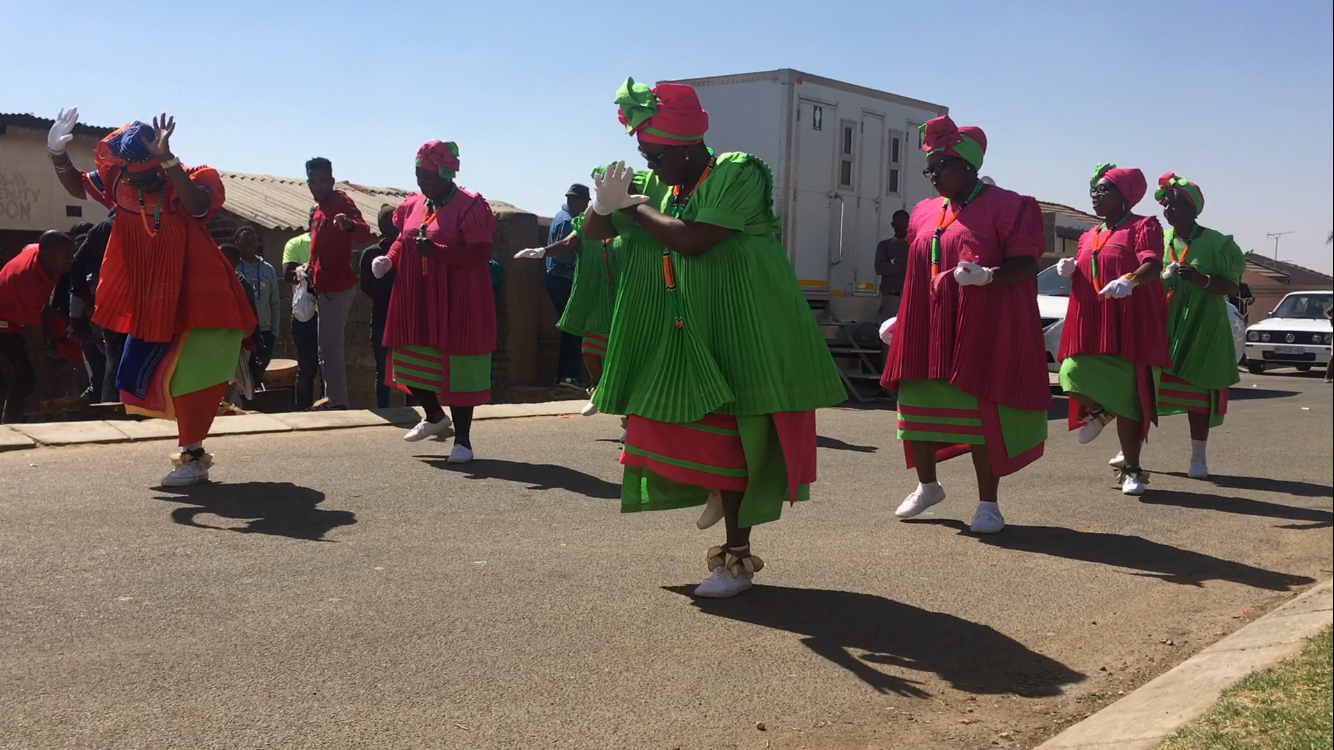
Traditional dancers performing at a wedding

Important crafts included metalsmithing, beadwork, pottery, house building and painting, and woodworking (especially the making of drums).

The Pedi are known for metal forging, beading, pottery, woodworking, much more in drum making, and also painting.

=== Mmino wa Setšo ===
Pedi music consists of a single six-note scale traditionally played on reeds, but currently it is played more on a jaw harp or autoharp. Migrants influenced by Kibala music play aluminum pipes of different heights to reproduce vocal harmonies. In traditional dances, women dance on their knees, usually accompanied by drums, backing vocals, and a lead singer. These dances involve vigorous topless shaking from the upper torso while the women kneel on the floor.

Songs are also part of Pedi culture. While working, the Pedi sang together to finish the job faster. They had A song about killing a lion to become a man.

The Bapedi also have different types of cultural music:

- Mpepetlwane: played by young girls
- Mmatšhidi: played by older men and women
- Kiba / Dinaka: played by men and boys and now joined by women
- Dipela: played by everyone
- Makgakgasa: played by older women

Pedi music (mmino wa setso: traditional music, lit. music of origin) has a six-note scale. The same applies to variants of Mmino wa Setšo as practiced by Basotho ba Leboa (Northern Sotho) tribes in the Capricorn, Blouberg, Waterberg districts, as well as BaVhenda in the Vhembe district. Mmino wa Setšo (indigenous African music) can also be construed as African musicology, a concept that is often used to distinguish the study of indigenous African music from the dominant ethnomusicology discipline in academia. Ethnomusicology has a strong footprint in academia spanning several decades. Such a presence is evident in ethnomusicology journals that can be traced back to the 1950s. Ethnomusicologists who study indigenous African music have been criticized for studying the subject from a subjective Western point of view, especially given the dominance of the Western musical canon in South Africa. In South Africa, authors such as Mapaya indicate that for many years, African Musicology has been studied from a multi-cultural perspective without success. Scholars of African Musicology such as Agawu, Mapaya, Nketia, and Nzewi emphasize the study of indigenous African music from the perspective, and language of the practitioners (baletši). These scholars argue for the study of African Musicology from an angle that elevates the practitioners, their actions, and their interactions.

==== Categories of Mmino wa Setšo ====
Mmino wa Setšo in Limpopo province has a number of categories. Categories of Mmino wa Setšo are distinguished according to the function they serve in the community.

===== Dinaka/Kiba =====
The peak of Pedi (and northern Sotho) musical expression is arguably the kiba genre, which has transcended its rural roots to become a migrant style. In its men's version, it features an ensemble of players, each playing an aluminum end-blown pipe of a different pitch (naka, pl. dinaka) and together producing a descending melody that mimics traditional vocal songs with richly harmonized qualities. Mapaya provides a detailed descriptive analysis of Dinaka/Kiba music and dance, from a Northern Sotho perspective.

====== Alternatives to Dinaka or Kiba ======
In the women's version, a development of earlier female genres that has recently been included within the definition of kiba, a group of women sing songs (koša ya dikhuru, loosely translated: knee-dance music). This translation has its roots in the traditional kneeling dance that involves salacious shaking movements of the breasts accompanied by chants. These dances are still very common among Tswana, Sotho, and Nguni women. This genre comprises sets of traditional songs steered by a lead singer accompanied by a chorus and an ensemble of drums (meropa), previously wooden but now made of oil drums and milk urns. These are generally sung at drinking parties and/or during celebrations such as weddings.

===== Mmino wa bana =====
Children occupy a special place in the broader category of Mmino wa Setšo. Research shows that mmino wa bana can be examined for its musical elements, educational validity, and general social functions

== Pedi heartland ==
The present-day Pedi area, Sekhukhuneland, is situated between the Olifants River (Lepelle) and its tributary, the Steelpoort River (Tubatse); bordered on the east by the Drakensberg range, and crossed by the Leolo mountains. At the height of its power, the Pedi polity under Thulare (about 1780–1820) included an area stretching from the site of present-day Rustenburg in the west to the Lowveld in the east, and ranging as far south as the Vaal River. Reliable historians and sources also credit the Pedi kingdom as the first and dominant monarchy established in the region. The kingdom, which boasted numerous victories over the Boers and the British armies, was one of the strongest and largest in Southern Africa in the mid- to late 1800s under the warrior king Sekhukhune I, whose kingdom stretched from the Vaal River in the south to the Limpopo River in the north.

=== Apartheid ===
The area under Pedi's control was severely limited when the polity was defeated by British troops in 1879. Reserves were created for this and for other Northern Sotho groups by the Transvaal Republic's Native Location Commission. Over the next hundred years or so, these reserves were then variously combined and separated by a succession of government planners. By 1972, this planning had culminated in the creation of an allegedly independent national unit, or homeland, named Lebowa. In terms of the government's plans to accommodate ethnic groups separated from each other, this was designed to act as a place of residence for all Northern Sotho speakers. However, many Pedi had never resided here: since the polity's defeat, they had become involved in a series of labor-tenancy or sharecropping arrangements with white farmers, lived as tenants on crown land, purchased farms communally as freeholders, or moved to live in the townships adjoining Pretoria and Johannesburg on a permanent or semi-permanent basis. In total, however, the population of the Lebowa homeland increased rapidly after the mid-1950s, due to the forced relocations from rural areas and cities in common South Africa undertaken by apartheid's planners, and to voluntary relocations by which former labor tenants sought independence from the restrictive and deprived conditions under which they had lived on the white farms.

== Subsistence and economy ==
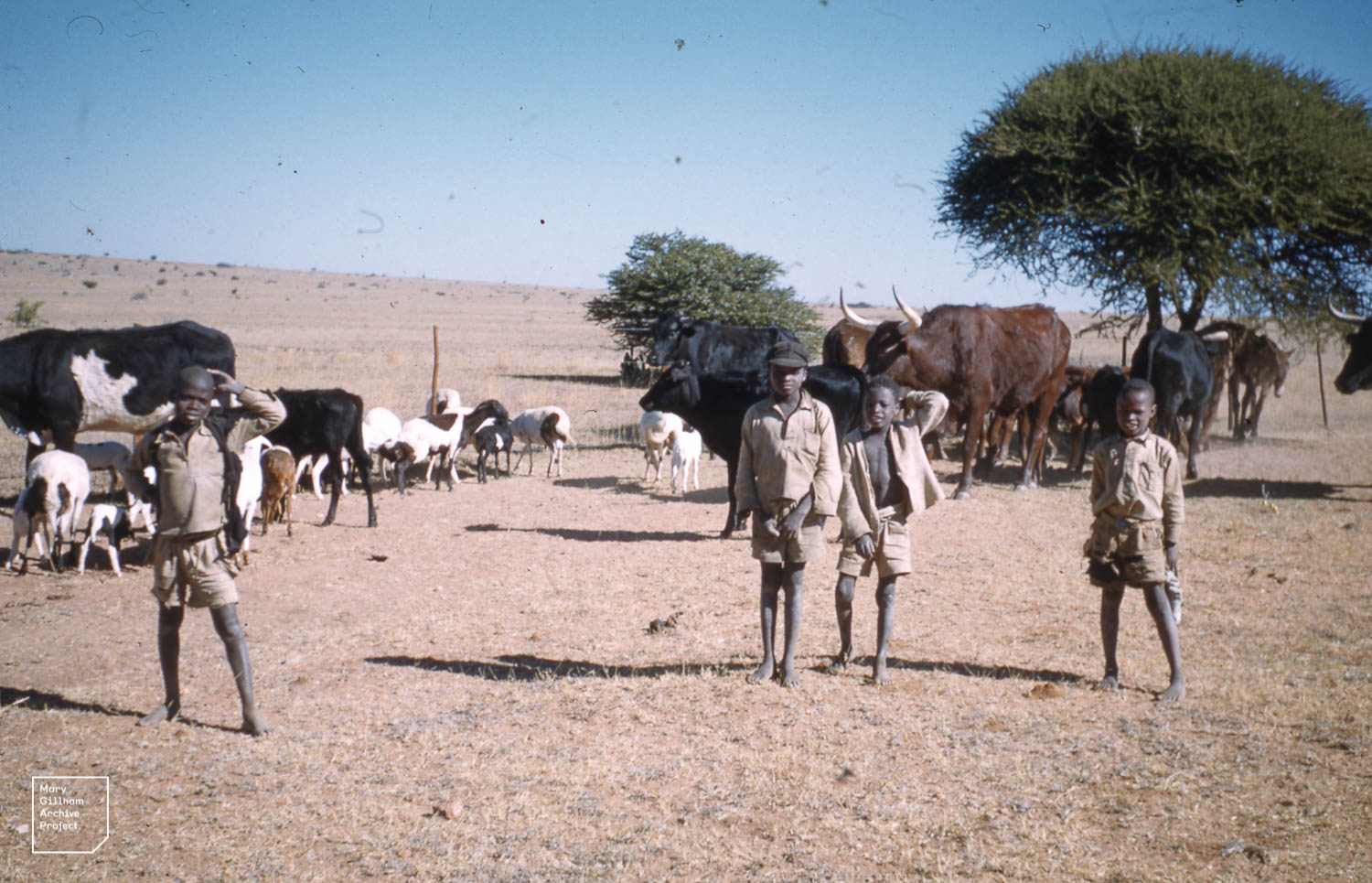
Overgrazed Bapedi reserve near Pietersburg, Drakensberg

The pre-conquest economy combined cattle-keeping with hoe cultivation. The principal crops were sorghum, pumpkins, and legumes, which were grown by women on fields allocated to them when they married. Women hoed and weeded, did pottery, built and decorated huts with mud; made sleeping mats and baskets, ground grain, cooked, brewed, and collected water and wood. Men did some work in fields at peak times; they hunted and herded; they did woodwork, prepared hides, and were metal workers and smiths. Most major tasks were done communally by matsema (work parties).

The chief was depended upon to perform rainmaking for his subjects. The introduction of the animal-drawn plow, and of maize, later transformed the labor division significantly, especially when combined with the effects of labor migration. Men's leaving home to work for wages was initially undertaken by regimental groups of youths to satisfy the paramount's firepower requirements but later became increasingly necessary to individual households as population increase within the reserve and land degradation made it impossible to subsist from cultivation alone. Despite increasingly long absences, male migrants nonetheless remained committed to the maintenance of their fields; plowing had now to be carried out during periods of leave or entrusted to professional plowmen or tractor owners. Women were left to manage and carry out all other agricultural tasks. Men, although subjected to increased controls in their lives as wage-laborers, fiercely resisted all direct attempts to interfere with the spheres of cattle-keeping and agriculture. Their resistance erupted in open rebellion, ultimately subdued, during the 1950s. In later decades, some families have continued to practice cultivation and keep stock.

In the early 1960s, about 48% of the male population was absent as wage-earners at any given time. Between the 1930s and the 1960s, most Pedi men would spend a short period working on nearby white farms, followed by a move to employment in the mines or domestic service, and later, especially in more recent times, to factories or industry. Female wage employment began more recently and is rarer and more sporadic. Some women work for short periods on farms; others have begun, since the 1960s, to work in domestic service in the towns of the Witwatersrand. In recent years, there have been rising levels of education and expectations, combined with a sharp drop in employment rates.

=== Land tenure ===
The pre-colonial system of communal or tribal tenure, which was broadly similar to that practiced throughout the southern African region, was crystallized but subtly altered, by the colonial administration. A man was granted land by the chief for each of his wives; unused land was reallocated by the chief rather than being inherited within families. Overpopulation resulting from the government's relocation policies resulted in this system being modified; a household's fields, together with its residential plot, are now inherited, ideally by the youngest married son. Christian Pedi communities that owned freehold farms were removed to the reserve without compensation, but since 1994, many have now reoccupied their land or are preparing to do so, under restitution legislation.

== Religion ==
Ancestors are viewed as intermediaries between humans and The Creator or God (Modimo/Mmopi) and are communicated to by calling on them using a process of burning incense, making an offering, and speaking to them (go phasa). If necessary, animal sacrifice may be done or beer presented to the children on both the mother's and father's sides. A key figure in the family ritual was the kgadi (who was usually the father's elder sister). The position of ngaka (diviner) was formerly inherited patrilineally but is now commonly inherited by a woman from her paternal grandfather or great-grandfather. This is often manifested through illness and through violent possession by spirits (malopo) of the body, the only cure for which is to train as a diviner. There has been a proliferation of diviners in recent times, with many said to be motivated mainly by a desire for material gain.

== Rulers ==
Name	Notes
Thulare I	Morwamoche unified many smaller Sotho-Tswana tribes and founded the Marota Empire with the Bapedi in the seat of leadership. Thulare continued his father's legacy of growing the bapedi kingship he died in 1824, on the day of a solar eclipse and this is the first definite date that can be established in the history of the Bapedi.
Molekutu I	After the death of Thulare I, his eldest son Molekutu I ascended to the throne only to be killed two years later with the arrival of Mzilikazi north of the Vaal.
Phetedi I	Molekutu I was succeeded by his brother. Phetedi but Phetedi ruled for less than a year before befalling the same fate as his older brother Molekutu under the spear of Mzilikazi's impi.
Sekwati I	Sekwati was the youngest son of Thulare I repelled Mzilikazi and the Mthwakazi attacks by holding ground in the forests north of Magoebaskloof. Long after the defeat of Mzilikazi at Silkaatsnek, Sekwati I returned to the lands of the Marota and ascended to the throne as Kgošigolo. Sekwati died in 1861.
Sekhukhune I	Upon the death of Sekwati, Sekhukhune challenged his brother Mampuru II to combat in a succession dispute. Mampuru II is said to have declined and Sekhukhune was made Kgoši. Sekhukhune expanded both the wealth and military power of the Marota empire and when war broke out between the ZAR and the Marota, Sekhukhune was victorious. After another war with British forces Sekhukhune was captured and held in Pretoria. Sekhukune was later assassinated by his brother Mampuru II.
Mampuru II	There is much debate over the succession dispute of Sekhukhune and Mampuru II. What is known is that with the aid of British forces, Mampuru succeeded in overthrowing Sekhukhune and personally killed him in 1882. Mampuru himself ruled in exile for about a year before being executed by the ZAR government for the murder of his brother.
Kgoloko (regent)	After the death of Sekhukhune's son Morwamoche II, It was decided that Kgoloko the son of Sekwati and half brother of both Sekhukhune I and Mampuru II would rule as regent until Sekhukhune's grandson and son of Morwamoche II was old enough to rule.
Sekhukhune II	Sekhukhune II was the grandson of Sekhukhune I and the son of Morwamoche II and succeeded his uncle Kgoloko as soon as he was deemed old enough. Sekhukhune II took advantage of wartime conditions during the Anglo-Boer War to reshape the pattern of colonial relations imposed on them by the ZAR, to attempt to re-establish the dominance of the Marota in the eastern Transvaal and to negotiate favourable terms with the occupying British military forces once the ZAR was defeated.
Thulare II	Thulare II the son of Sekhukhune II died without issue.
Morwamoche III	Upon the death of his older brother, Morwamoche III held the throne until his death.
Mankopodi (regent)	When Morwamoche III died, his heir Rhyane Thulare was too young to rule and so Morwamoche III's wife and mother to Rhyane ruled as regent.
Rhyane Thulare	Had allegedly refused to ascend to the throne without his mother's blessing. Rhyane however did not renounce his claim to the rulership. Rhyane reasserted his claim for the throne in 1989. Rhyane Thulare died in 2007.
Kgagudi Kenneth Sekhukhune as Sekhukhune III (regent)	Kgagudi Kenneth Sekhukhune was the son of Morwamoche III and was installed as "acting king" in 1976 until such time as the complications surrounding Rhyane Thulare's succession was sorted out. However, when Rhyane Thulare died, Kgagudi Kenneth Sekhukhune attempted to establish himself as the rightful Kgošikgolo (King) of the Bapedi.
Victor Thulare III as Thulare III	Thulare III was the son of Rhyane Thulare and had disputed the kingship with the acting king, his uncle, Sekhukhune III. A court ruling in 2018 recognised Thulare III as the incumbent, but this was still disputed by his uncle, who declared his son, Sekwati II Khutšo Sekhukhune, the new king. Thulare III was confirmed as king in July 2020 after the court ruled Sekwati II's rule unlawful and ordered him to vacate the throne. Thulare III died on 6 January 2021.
Manyaku Thulare (regent)	Upon the death of her son, the Queen mother Manyaku Thulare was announced as regent for the Bapedi people. Ramphelane Thulare, the uncle of the late King Victor Thulare III announced that none of the late kings 5 children are eligible to ascend the throne as their mothers are not "candle wives". The Bapedi nation intends to marry a 'candle wife' in Lesotho who will give birth to the heir to the throne as per the wishes of the late king. Therefore, Queen mother Manyaku Thulare will act as the regent until the candle wife is married.

== Notable Pedi ==
- Yvonne Chaka Chaka, born Yvonne Machaka, South African singer, songwriter and actress
- Chymamusique, South African DJ & music producer
- DJ Cleo, South African DJ & producer
- Focalistic, rapper
- Lerato Kganyago, South African media personality
- Lesetja Kganyago, governor of South African Reserve Bank
- Don Laka, South African jazz musician
- Edward Lekganyane, Zion Christian Church (ZCC) leader
- Engenas Lekganyane, founder of Zion Christian Church (ZCC)
- Eric Macheru, actor
- Phuti Mahanyele, CEO of Shanduka Group
- Sefako Makgatho, second president of the African National Congress, born in Ga-Mphahlele village
- Malegapuru William Makgoba, doctor
- Thabo Makhanyo Madiye Makgoba, Anglican archbishop of Cape Town
- David Makhura, premier of Gauteng Province
- Julius Malema, former leader of the ANC Youth League and current commander in chief of the Economic Freedom Fighters (EFF)
- Mampuru II, king of the Pedi (1879–1883)
- Harriet Manamela, Skeem Saam actress
- Lesley Manyathela, former South African football player
- Clement Maosa, South African actor, lawyer and Lekompo artist
- Kwena Maphaka, South African cricket player
- DJ Maphorisa, South African DJ & record producer
- Richard Maponya, South African businessman and founder and first president of the National African Federated Chamber of Commerce (NAFCOC); born in Lenyeye, Tzaneen
- Master KG, artist and composer of the popular song "Jerusalema"
- Cassel Mathale, third premier of Limpopo province
- Lebo Mathosa, musician
- Kenneth Meshoe, politician
- Peter Mokaba, former leader of the ANC Youth League
- Lydia Mokgokoloshi, South African actress
- Sello Moloto, former premier of Limpopo province
- Trott Moloto, former South African national soccer coach
- King Monada, Lekompo artist
- Kgalema Motlanthe, 3rd president of South Africa
- Mathole Motshekga, politician
- Aaron Motsoaledi, minister of health, South Africa
- Caroline Motsoaledi, political activist
- Elias Motsoaledi, anti-apartheid activist, one of the eight men sentenced to life imprisonment at the Rivonia Trial
- Es'kia Mphahlele, writer
- Letlapa Mphahlele, former president of the Pan Africanist Congress (PAC)
- Kamo Mphela, amapiano artist
- Gift Ngoepe, baseball player
- Lilian Ngoyi, anti-apartheid activist
- Maite Nkoana-Mashabane, minister of Rural Development and Land Reform, South Africa
- Gwen Ramokgopa, deputy minister of health, former MEC of health in Gauteng Province
- Kgosientsho Ramokgopa, former mayor of City of Tshwane Metropolitan Municipality
- Mamphela Ramphele, former director of the World Bank, former principal of the University of Cape Town
- Sello Rasethaba, businessman
- Thabo Sefolosha, American basketball player
- Tlou Segolela, former South African football player
- Kgaogelo Sekgota, South African football player
- King Matsebe Sekhukhune, son of King Sekwati; fought two wars: first successfully in 1876 against the SAR and their Swazi allies, then unsuccessfully against the British and Swazi in 1879 during the Sekukuni Wars
- Caiphus Semenya, musician
- Caster Semenya, athlete and Olympic medal winner
- Judith Sephuma, musician
- Tokyo Sexwale, former premier of Gauteng
- Shandesh, Lekompo singer
- Shebeshxt, Lekompo artist
- DJ Spoko, South African record producer & DJ
- Hilda Tloubatla, singer
- Africa Tsoai, actor

== See also ==
- Tswana people
- Sotho people
- Sotho-Tswana peoples
- Barotseland
- Lozi people
- Bokone
