= Ndlovu =

Ndlovu (/ˈndloʊvuː/, lit. 'elephant') is a surname, common in South Africa and Zimbabwe, originating from the Nguni languages and prevalent among the Ndebele and Zulu people. Notable people with the surname include:

- Adam Ndlovu (1970–2012), Zimbabwean footballer
- Ainsley Ndlovu (born 1996), Zimbabwean cricketer
- Bandisa Ndlovu (born 1996), South African rugby union player
- Bekithemba Ndlovu (born 1976), Zimbabwean footballer
- Callistus Ndlovu (1936–2019), Zimbabwean politician
- Curnick Ndlovu (1932–2002), South-African politician
- Dennis Ndlovu ( 1990 - 1992) Zimbabwean politician .
- Dino Ndlovu (born 1990), South African footballer
- Dudu Mntowaziwayo Ndlovu (1957–1992), known as Dudu Zulu, South African dancer, percussionist, and singer
- Duma Ndlovu (born 1954), South African filmmaker, playwright, and poet
- Gerald Ndlovu (born 1984), Zimbabwean footballer
- Gerard Sithunywa Ndlovu (1939–2013), South African Roman Catholic bishop
- Hastings Ndlovu (1961–1976), black South African schoolboy who was shot dead by the police in the Soweto uprising against the apartheid system
- Hungani Ndlovu (born 1994), South African actor and dancer
- King Ndlovu (born 1993), South African footballer
- Lee Ndlovu (born 1994), Zimbabwean footballer
- Lindela Ndlovu (1953–2015), Zimbabwean academic
- Lindiwe Ndlovu (1977–2021), South African actress
- Louis Ncamiso Ndlovu (1945–2012), Swazi Roman Catholic bishop
- Madinda Ndlovu (born 1965), Zimbabwean footballer and manager
- Mandla Ndlovu (born 1969), South African politician
- Mangaliso Ndlovu (born 1980), Zimbabwean politician
- Masotsha Ndlovu (1890–1982), Southern Rhodesian labour union leader
- Methembe Ndlovu (born 1976), Zimbabwean footballer
- Moses Ndlovu (born 1956/57), Zimbabwean politician
- Naison Ndlovu (1930–2017), Zimbabwean politician and deputy president of the Senate
- Njabulo Ndlovu (born 1994), Swazi footballer
- Ntombiyelanga Ndlovu, Zimbabwean footballer
- Peter Ndlovu (born 1973), Zimbabwean footballer and manager
- Phyllis Ndlovu (died 2022), Zimbabwean politician
- Robert Ndlovu (born 1955) Zimbabwean Roman Catholic priest and current archbishop of Harare
- Rosemary Ndlovu (born 1978), South African serial killer
- Sabelo J. Ndlovu-Gatsheni (born 1968), Zimbabwean academic
- Sandile Ndlovu (born 1980), South African footballer
- Sasko Ndlovu, South African rugby union player
- Sikhanyiso Ndlovu (1937–2015), Zimbabwean politician
- Siphesihle Ndlovu (born 1996), South African footballer
- Siphiwe Gloria Ndlovu (born 1977), Zimbabwean novelist and filmmaker
- Sipho Ndlovu (born 1994), Zimbabwean footballer
- Siyanda Ndlovu (born 2002), South African soccer player
- Sizwe Ndlovu (born 1980), South African rower
- Stephanie Ndlovu Sandows (born 1990), South African actress and television presenter
- Takalani Ndlovu (born 1978), South African boxer
- Thandi Ndlovu (1953/54–2019), South African physician and businesswoman
- Themba Ndlovu (born 1984), Zimbabwean footballer
- Thulani Tiblon Ndlovu (born 1979), South African Politician and ANC leader in Gauteng Province
- Ursula Ndlovu (born 1994), Zimbabwean netball player
- Yichida Ndlovu, first Zambian female pilot
- Sambulo Ndlovu (passed away 2020), National Hero and Brigadier General. Helped Ndebeles during the Gukurahundi war

== See also ==
- Ndhlovu
- Ndlovu v Ngcobo, 2002 case in South African property law
- S v Ndlovu, 2005 South African legal case
