= Mampuru II =

King of the Bapedi
- Reign: 1879 – 22 November 1883
- Predecessor: Sekhukhune I
- Successor: Kgoloko (regent for Sekhukhune II)
- Born: 1824
- Died: 22 November 1883 (aged 59)
- House: Maroteng
- Mother: Kgomomakatane

Mampuru II (1824 – 22 November 1883) was a king of the Pedi people in southern Africa.

Sekwati died in 1861 and his son, Sekhukhune claimed the throne. Sekhukhune ruled until 1879 when a British-Swazi invasion deposed him and installed Mampuru as king. Mampuru ordered the assassination of Sekhukhune in 1882 for which he was arrested and hanged by the Boer South African Republic the following year. Mampuru is regarded as an early liberation movement icon in South Africa and the prison where he was executed has been renamed in his honour.

== Early life ==
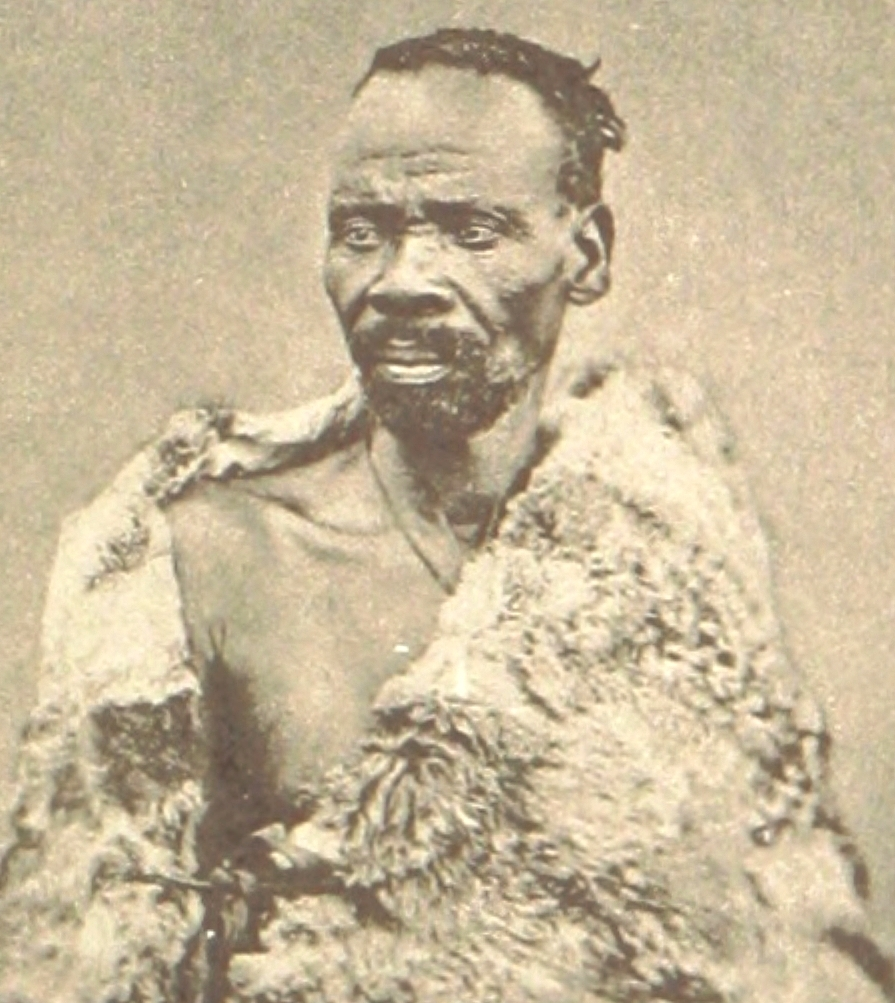
Sekhukhune, Mampuru's half brother and rival

Sekwati died in 1861, but this resulted in a succession crisis. It was traditional for Pedi rulers to take a timamollo ("candle wife" or "great wife") in addition to their usual wife. The children of the candlewife would be those who succeeded to the throne, ahead of the other descendants. Mampuru was the child of the candlewife of Sekwati's elder brother (Maripane Thobejane), Malekutu, and Sekwati had afterwards married his mother. Mampuru claimed to have been designated heir by Sekwati, over Sekhukhune, the elder son of Sekwati, and was in possession of the royal insignia. Sekhukhune claimed that Mampuru's mother was not impregnated by Sekwati and that Sekwati had ordered a commoner to get her pregnant. It was also claimed that Sekwati's marriage to Mampuru's mother was not legitimate as he had not provided the customary present of a black bull.

Sekhukhune seized power and killed Mampuru's advisers, causing him to flee the realm. Sekhukhune's reign was generally beneficial for the Pedi, he expanded the realm through conquest and marriage, invested in the mining and agricultural industries and purchased firearms for his army. However he came into conflict with the neighbouring Boer South African Republic (also known as the Transvaal) and the Swazi people in what became known as the Sekhukune War.

== Accession and execution ==
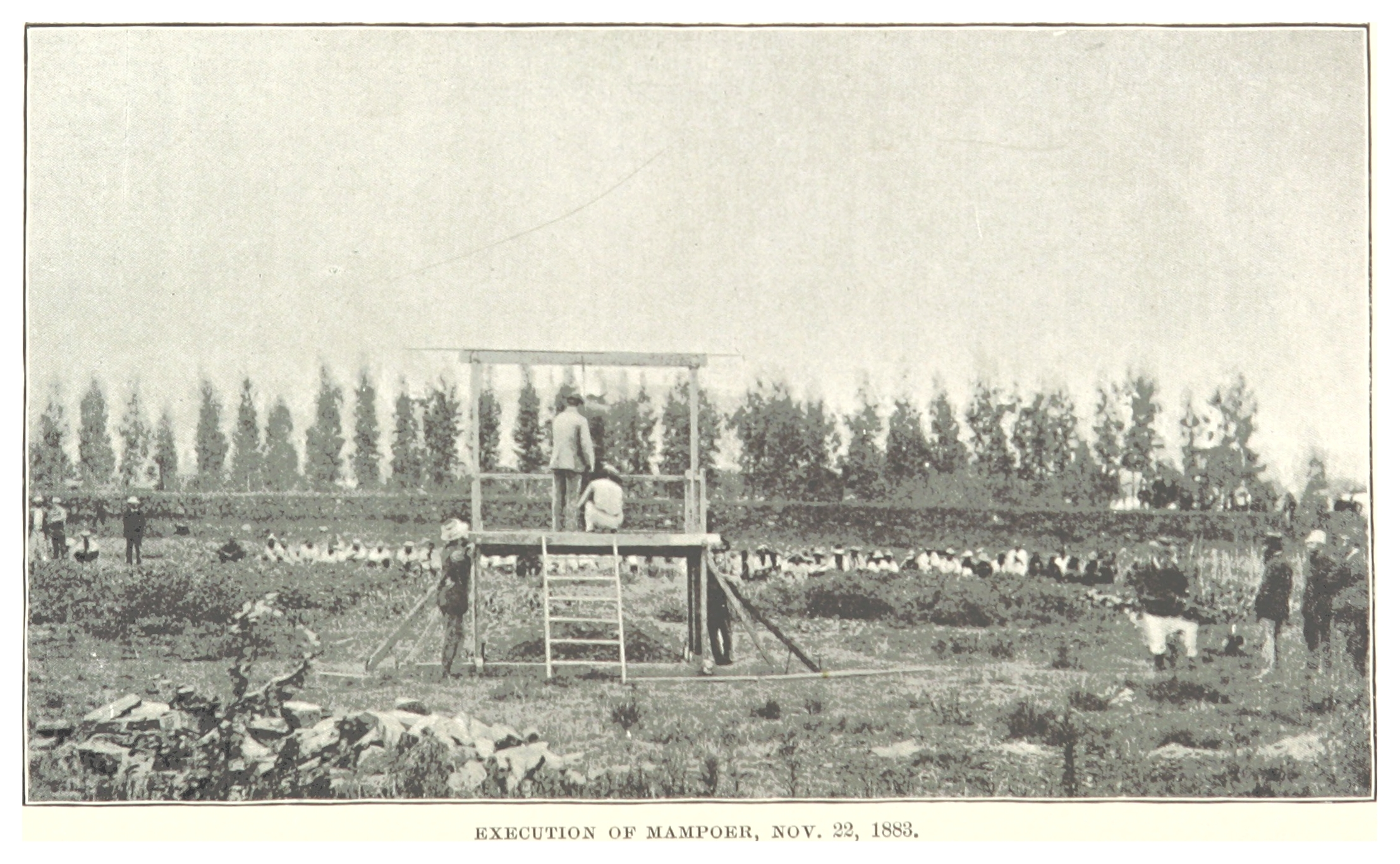
Mampuru's execution

The British Empire annexed the Transvaal in 1877, and in the aftermath, a combined British-Swazi force invaded the Pedi realm in 1879. Sekhukune was deposed, and the British High Commissioner of Southern Africa, Sir Garnet Wolseley, installed Mampuru in his place. The Transvaal regained some independence following the First Boer War of 1880–81, though Britain retained control of foreign affairs and relations with tribal societies.

Mampuru claimed that Sekhukhune was plotting against him to regain the throne and ordered his murder. Sekhukhune was stabbed to death at the Great Place, Manoge, on 13 August 1882. Mampuru was afterwards arrested and charged with public violence, revolt, and the murder of Sekhukhune. He was arrested because of his opposition to the hut tax imposed upon black people by the South African Republic. Mampuru was stripped naked and hanged in public at the Pretoria Central Prison on 22 November 1883. The rope broke the first time, and he was dragged back onto the gallows to be hanged again.

== Legacy ==
Sekhukhune's descendants became king after Mampuru's death, though the rival families maintained their claims through the colonial, apartheid and rainbow (post-1991) eras. The South African government's Commission on Traditional Leadership Disputes and Claims ruled on the Pedi succession in 2008. The commission ruled that the Sekhukhune lineage was the legitimate one and confirmed Kgagudi Kenneth Sekhukhune as king.

The location of Mampuru's remains is not known, though the South African government committed to look for them in January 2019. Mampuru has been described as one of South Africa's first liberation icons. Potgieter Street (part of the R101 road in Pretoria) was renamed in his honour in 2007 and an annual Mampuru II day is held in January. On 10 April 2013 the prison where he was killed was renamed "Kgosi Mampuru II" in his honour. In February 2018 a statue of Mampuru was proposed to be erected in Church Square, Pretoria where it will stand opposite one of Paul Kruger who was President of the South African Republic at the time of Mampuru's execution.

== See also ==
- Sekwati
- Sekhukhune II
- Nyabela
- Pedi people
