= Sekwati =

Sekwati I Thulare

King of the Bapedi
- Reign: c. 1824 – 20 September 1861
- Predecessor: Phetedi
- Successor: Sekhukhune I
- Born: Unknown
- Died: 20 September 1861
- Burial: Thaba Mosega
- Issue: Sekhukhune I; Mampuru II; Johannes Dinkwanyane; Kgoloko
- Father: Thulare
- Religion: African traditional religion

Sekwati (c. 1824 – 20 September 1861) was a 19th-century paramount King of the Maroteng, more commonly known as the Bapedi people. His reign focused on rebuilding the Marota Empire at the conclusion of the Mfecane and maintaining peaceful relations with the Boer Voortrekkers and neighboring chiefdoms in the north-eastern Transvaal. He was the father of rivals Sekhukhune I who took over the Marota/Pedi paramountcy by force, and Mampuru II, his rightful successor.

By the death of his father Thulare I in 1824, the Marota Empire or Pedi Kingdom was in a state of despair due to the turbulence caused by the Mfecane ("the crushing") or Difeqane ("the scattering") and encroaching white settlers (Boers) into the Transvaal. Sekwati came into power after the deaths of his older brothers (Malekutu, Matsebe and Phetedi) who were killed during raids by Mzilikazi's Matabele. To rebuild the empire, he moved his capital from Phiring to Thaba Mosego.

== Rise of King Sekwati ==
The Campaigns against the Pedi were a series of military endeavors conducted by the Swazi in an attempt to subdue the Pedi people. Despite their efforts, the Swazi were unable to conquer the Pedi's well-fortified mountain strongholds. As a result, some Pedi fugitives managed to regroup and continue their resistance.

By the turn of the 19th century, the Pedi had undergone significant changes in their political landscape. King Thulare emerged as a powerful leader and established an empire with its capital, Manganeng, situated on the Steelpoort River. This period marked the ascendancy of the Pedi, who became a ruling caste under King Thulare's leadership.

However, the stability of the Pedi empire was short-lived as succession disputes arose following King Thulare's death. Around 1826, the Ndebele under Mzilikazi seized the opportunity and overthrew the Pedi regime, resulting in the deaths of several of Thulare's sons.

Amidst the upheaval, one of Thulare's surviving sons, Sekwati, took refuge with the fleeing Pedi. Later, Sekwati returned with his followers and strategically chose Phiring, a mountain stronghold, as his base of operation. Through his skillful leadership and astute diplomacy, Sekwati managed to reunite the Pedi people and consolidate various chiefdoms under his rule, eventually becoming the paramount King.

Under Sekwati's leadership, the Pedi were on the path to establishing a formidable kingdom. However, their progress faced challenges with the expansion of white settlers in southern Africa, which imposed limitations on their independence.

In an effort to secure peace and prosperity, Sekwati maintained diplomatic ties with neighboring groups, including the Boers, Swazi, and Zulu. Nevertheless, tensions escalated over time, and in 1852, Hendrik Potgieter led a Boer commando against King Sekwati's forces.

The Boers laid siege to the Pedi stronghold, hoping to exhaust their food and water supplies. However, the resourceful Pedi warriors managed to evade the Boer lines at night, sustaining themselves during the lengthy siege. After twenty-four days, the Boers departed, taking the Pedi cattle with them.

Recognizing the strategic importance of an abundant water supply, Sekwati relocated his capital to Thaba Mosega (Mosega Kop). He subsequently signed a treaty with the Boers, establishing the Steelpoort River as the boundary between Pedi lands and the Lydenburg Republic.

Moreover, king Sekwati permitted Alexander Merensky and C. H. T. Grützner to begin evangelical work within his territory, contributing to the religious and cultural dynamics of the Pedi kingdom or Marota Empire.

== Bibliography ==
- Peter Nicholas St. Martin Delius, The Pedi Polity Under Sekwati and Sekhukhune, 1828-1880, University of London (School of Oriental and African Studies).
- Barbara Oomen, Chiefs in South Africa: Law, Power & Culture in the Post-apartheid Era, University of KwazuluNatal Press, 2005.

== See also ==
- Mampuru II
- Sekhukhune I
- Sekhukhune II
- Pedi people
