= Shoki =

Shoki or Shōki may refer to:

- the Japanese pronunciation of Zhong Kui, a figure in Chinese mythology, traditionally regarded as a vanquisher of ghosts and evil beings
- Nakajima Ki-44 Shōki, a single-engine fighter aircraft used by the Imperial Japanese Army Air Force in World War II
- Nihon Shoki, sometimes translated as The Chronicles of Japan, the second oldest book of classical Japanese history
- Kamen Rider Shōki, a fictional character from Kamen Rider Hibiki

== People with the given name ==
- Shoki Coe, Taiwanese-British theologian
- Shoki Hirai (平井 将生; born 1987), Japanese footballer
- Shoki Kasahara (笠原 将生; born 1991), Japanese former professional baseball
- Shoki Mokgapa (1984–2018), South African actress
- Shoki Nagano (長野 星輝; born 2002), Japanese footballer
- Shoki Sebotsane (born 1977), South African actress
- Terutsuyoshi Shoki (照強 翔輝; born 1995), Japanese professional sumo wrestler
