= Africa Tsoai =

South African actor and sound engineer

- Born: 4 July 1967 (age 58); Hebron, South Africa
- Education: Rudolph College
- Occupations: Actor; Voice-over artist; Producer; Businessman; Sound engineer; Translator
- Years active: 1990s–present
- Children: 4

Africa Tsoai (born 4 July 1967) is a South African actor and businessman best known for the role of Tsokotla on the soap opera, Mokgonyana Mmatswale and John Maputla on Skeem Saam.

== Career ==
Afrika Tsoai has acted in most retro dramas and most notable for 80s drama Mokgonyana Mmatswale as Tsokotla, a young man who was a taxi driver and in love with an older woman. He is most famous for acting as John Maputla, the husband of Meikie Maputla and father of Leeto and Thabo Maputla in SABC 1's soap, Skeem Saam.
