= Charles Maja =

South African actor (1966–2020)

- Born: Charles Maja; 1966; Limpopo, South Africa
- Died: 9 April 2020 (aged 54); Limpopo, South Africa
- Other name: Big Boy
- Education: Action School of Drama
- Occupation: Actor
- Years active: 1984–2020
- Spouse: Mamopudi Maja
- Children: 3

Charles Maja (1966 – 9 April 2020), affectionately known by his teledrama role Big Boy, was a South African actor. Even though he never had formal training in acting career, Maja became a popular radio artist in early 1980s and later became very popular with the role in the television soap opera Skeem Saam.

== Personal life ==
Charles Maja was born in 1966 in Limpopo, South Africa.

He was married to his longtime partner, Mamopudi. The couple had three children: Mahlatse, Molagare, and Mapula.

He died on 9 April 2020 in Limpopo at the age of 54 after suffering a sudden stroke. His family and the Limpopo Artist Movement (LAM) hosted a memorial service after lifting the COVID-19 pandemic restrictions. The funeral service took place in his home village of Ga-Maja in Limpopo. However, his family was fined R5 000 for violating lockdown regulations during the funeral.

== Career ==
He studied drama at Action School of Drama in Limpopo. Before entering television, he made extensive roles on over twenty radio dramas at Sepedi radio station Thobela FM in 1984. During this period, he appeared in the radio soap opera Mahlakung with the role "Bra Tick". However, he later took a break from radio to finish his matric. Then until 1996, he worked as a fashion designer. In 1997, he moved to professional acting, after he was cast as "Motlolu" in the SABC 2 television serial Ke Bona Boloi.

Initially, he was auditioned for a soapie in 2011 and got selected for recurring role. However, later in 2016, he joined with the cast of SABC 1 soap opera Skeem Saam and played the role of "Big Boy Mabitsela", the abusive, alcoholic father of Leshole Mabitsela. The role became highly popular where he continued to play the role for many years.
