= Lepono Ndhlovu =

Ugandan cricketer (born 1986)

Personal information
- Born: 25 February 1986 (age 40); Jinja, Uganda
- Batting: Right-handed

Domestic team information
- Years: Team
- Uganda
- Source: Cricinfo, 25 March 2014

Lepono Ndhlovu (born 25 February 1986), also known as Abram Mutyagaba, is a Ugandan former cricketer. A right-handed batsman and occasional wicket-keeper. Ndhlovu represented the Uganda national cricket team, including at the 2014 ICC Cricket World Cup Qualifier. In addition to his international appearances, he played first-class and List A cricket in South Africa across a decade, making more than 120 appearances in domestic competitions between 2005 and 2015.

== Early life and background ==
Ndhlovu was born on 25 February 1986 in Jinja, Uganda. He is noted in cricket records under both names_ Lepono Ndhlovu and Abram Mutyagaba _ due to how his birth and playing records were recorded in different countries and databases.

== Domestic and South African career ==
Lepono Ndhlovu developed his cricketing career in South Africa, where he began playing age-group cricket for Notherns, a provincial side in domestic competitions. Shortly after, he made his senior debut in 2005 at age 19, establishing himself as a regular player over the next several seasons. During his time in South Africa he appeared across formats, including first-class, List A, and domestic T20 fixtures, for teams such as Northerns, Titans, Pretoria University, and later KwaZula-Natal Inland.

Results from Cricket Archive and player tracking sites list Ndhlovu as having played more than 120 matches in South African domestic competitions between 2005 and 2015, combing first-class and List A appearances.

== International career ==
Ndhlovu made his international debut for Uganda later in his career, representing his native country at major ICC events. He was part of the Ugandan squad at the 2014 ICC Cricket World Cup Qualifier held in New Zealand, a tournament featuring associate nations competing for qualification to the 2015 Cricket World Cup. In that event he appeared in multiple matches, including scoring 16 runs against Nepal in a group fixture.

Although Uganda did not qualify for the 2015 World Cup, Ndhlovu's inclusion in the squad and his participation in the qualifier underscore his status as one of the leading Ugandan cricketers of his generation.

== Playing style ==
Ndhlovu was recognised as a right-handed batsman capable of contributing useful middle-order runs and as a flexible player with domestic experience in both batting and occasional wicket-keeping roles during his South African domestic career. Match scorecards from Ugandan fixtures, such as the 2014 World Cup Qualifier - show him contributing with the bat of Uganda in competitive associate-level one-day cricket.

== Legacy ==
Lepono Ndhlovu's career exemplifies the pathway of an associate nation cricketer who built his skills in a strong domestic environment (South Africa) before representing his country on the international stage. His dual identity in records, as Lepono Ndhlovu in South Africa and Abram Mutyagaba in Uganda, is a point of interest in cricketing databases and underscores the complexities of tracking players across international and domestic systems

== See also ==
- Cricket in Uganda - Overview of the sport's development and national team history.
- Joel Olwenyi
- Uganda national cricket team- The national representative side in ICC Competitions
- ICC Cricket World Cup Qualifier - Tournament in which Ndhlovu represented Uganda
