= Lerato Marabe =

South African actress and DJ

- Born: 28 June 1999 (age 27); Vosloorus , Gauteng, South Africa
- Education: AFDA
- Occupations: Actress; DJ
- Years active: 2004–Present
- Notable work: Skeem Saam

Lerato Marabe (born 28 June 1999) is a South African actress and DJ. She is best known for her long-running role as Pretty Seakamela on the SABC 1 soap opera Skeem Saam.

== Life and career ==
Lerato was born in Vosloorus a township in Ekurhuleni, Gauteng, South Africa. She was raised by her mother, a teacher, alongside her brother. She attended Boksburg High School in South Africa and completed her matriculation in 2017. She subsequently graduated with a Degree in Film Editing from AFDA Cape-Town.

Lerato began her career as a child actor appearing on Takalani Sesame and the SABC1 drama Intersexions. At the age of 11, she was cast in a role of Pretty Seakamela on Skeem Saam Saam. She has remained a central character on the show since its premiere in 2011.

In addition to acting, Marabe has worked as a model. In 2020 she was selected as one of the new faces for the luxury brand Quiteria Atelier's campaign titled 'The new order'.

== Filmography ==
- Skeem Saam season 1-8 as Pretty
- Isibaya season 1 as Nelisa
- Mzanzi Love season 3 as Babalwa
- Intersexions season 2 as Mpho
- End Game season 1 as Precious
- Big friend little friend as Lisha
- Madiba Series as Thembi Thambo
