= Sekhukhune II =

King of the Bapedi
- Predecessor: Sekhukhune I
- Regent: Kgoloko
- House: Maroteng
- Father: Morwamoche II

Sekhukhune II was the paramount King of the Bapedi and the grandson of Sekhukhune I. He reigned during the Second Anglo-Boer War.

Sekhukhune's reign marked the final collapse of the Bapedi resistance against the occupation of their land by the South African Republic and the British Empire. Sekhukhune II's heir, Thulare II, predeceased him, and Kgobalale was appointed regent instead of his elder brother Seraki. It was the Pedi nation at large that turned down the appointment of Seraki due to his unruly behavior. They believed that if Kgobalale should have a problem, he could notify his brother Seraki, as he was trusted to do when it came to war.

== See also ==
- Sekwati
- Mampuru II
- Sekhukhune I
- Pedi people
