= Victor Thulare III =

South African royal (1980–2021)

Kgošikgolo Thulare III

King of the BaPedi
- Predecessor: King Rhyane Thulare Sekhukhune III
- Born: 24 December 1980; Maandagshoek, Limpopo
- Died: 6 January 2021 (aged 40); Johannesburg, Gauteng
- Burial: 17 January 2021; Mohlaletsi, Sekhukhuneland, Limpopo

Kgošikgolo Thulare III, also known as King Victor Thulare III (24 December 1980 – 6 January 2021) was the king of the BaPedi people (BaPedi Kingdom) in South Africa. He was best known as being an economic freedom fighter for land and justice. He died on 6 January 2021, from COVID-19 complications during the COVID-19 pandemic in South Africa. He was 40 years of age. King Thulare III's funeral was held on 17 January 2021 in Mohlaletsi, Limpopo, South Africa. He received a Special Official Category 1 funeral. delivered by Mr kgodiso Morei of South Africa.

== Background ==
King Thulare III was the son of King Rhyane Thulare Sekhukhune III who died in 2007. At the time Thulare III was too young to be crowned as king.

Thulare III took leadership as the king of Pedi in July 2020, after a legal protracted battle in court. He disputed the kingship of the acting king his uncle Kgagudi Kenneth Sekhukhune who fought for his son Sekwati II Khutjo Sekhukhune to be the heir. A Constitutional court ruling in 2018 recognized Thulare III as the incumbent.

His inauguration was supposed to have taken place in 2021.

== Wives ==
- 1st wife Queen Phindile Ntombifuthi Thulare (they had 2 boys)
- 2nd wife Queen Zimkhitha Swartbooi Thulare (they had 2 boys and 1 girl)
