= Thabiso Molokomme =

South African actor (born 2001)

- Born: Thabiso Molokomme; 12 May 2001 (age 25); Polokwane, Limpopo, South Africa
- Education: University of Johannesburg
- Occupations: Actor; entrepreneur; television personality
- Years active: 2020–present
- Notable work: Skeem Saam

Thabiso Molokomme (born 12 May 2001) is a South African actor, entrepreneur and television personality. He is best known playing the lead role as Paxton Kgomo in the SABC 1 soap opera Skeem Saam (2022–present).

== Life and career ==
Molokomme was born and raised in Polokwane, Limpopo, South Africa. He matriculated from Capricorn High School in 2018 and later obtained a diploma in Operations Management from the University of Johannesburg.

Molokomme began his television career in 2020 as a presenter on the SABC 1 youth programme YoTV. In early 2022, he joined the cast of Skeem Saam, portraying Paxton Kgomo. In 2023, he won the Best Actor (Viewers' Choice) award at the Royalty Soapie Awards.

=== Business activities ===
In 2024, Molokomme launched a skincare brand called Ba Kene.

== Filmography ==
Year	Title	Role	Notes
2020	YoTV	Himself	Presenter
2022–present	Skeem Saam	Paxton Kgomo	Recurring role

== Awards and nominations ==
Year	Association	Category	Work	Result	Ref.
2023	Royalty Soapie Awards	Best Actor (Viewers' Choice)	Himself	Won	
2023	Royalty Soapie Awards	Outstanding Newcomer	As Paxton Kgomo on Skeem Saam	Nominated	
