= Ndhlovu =

Ndhlovu is an African surname that may refer to:

- Annastacia Ndhlovu, Zimbabwean politician
- Kelvin Ndhlovu (born 1985), Zambian squash player
- Lepono Ndhlovu (born 1986), Ugandan cricketer
- Pardon Ndhlovu (born 1987), Zimbabwean marathon runner
- Samuel Ndhlovu (1937–2001), Zambian football player and coach

== See also ==
- Ndlovu
