= Mogau Motlhatswi =

South African actress

Mogau Paulina Motlhatswi
- Born: Mogau Paulina Motlhatswi; 13 July 1992 (age 34); Mogoto, Limpopo, South Africa
- Education: University of Johannesburg
- Occupation: Actress
- Years active: 2011–present

Mogau Motlhatswi (born 13 July 1992) is a South African actress popularly known for her role as Mapitsi Magongwa, the Queen and wife of Thabo Maputla (Hungani Ndlovu) in the soap opera, Skeem Saam.

== Early life ==
=== Early life and education ===
Mogau Motlhatswi was born and raised at Mogoto village suitated at Limpopo province. She attended Brixton's Piet van Vuuren Primary School during her time at school she was involved in athletics sport activities before she went St. Mary's High School where she got matriculated.

Mogau attended the University of Johannesburg where she studied audiovisual communication.

== Career ==
She is currently acting on Skeem Saam. She has also acted in MTVShuga.

== Television role ==
In Skeem Saam, she plays Mapitsi, Alfred Magongwa's niece. She is also the sister of Sonti Magongwa and the mother to Pitsi and Oratile. She is married to Thabo Maputla, who is Pitsi and Orarile's father.
