= Sello Sebotsane =

South African actress and producer

- Born: Sello Sebotsane; 23 October 1970 (age 55); Tshwane, South Africa
- Education: Tshwane University of Technology
- Occupations: Actor, Producer
- Years active: 1994–present
- Spouse: Shoki Sebotsane (div)
- Children: 1

Sello Sebotsane (born 23 October 1970) is a South African actor and producer. He is best known for the roles in the television serials such as Stokvel, Those Who Can't, Rockville and 90 Plein Street.

== Personal life ==
Sebotsane was born on 23 October 1970 in Tshwane, South Africa. He completed a National Diploma in Speech and Drama from the Tshwane University of Technology.

He was married to fellow actress and fashion designer Shoki Sebotsane. The couple has a daughter, Oratile Kutlwano. In 2018, Shoki was strangled twice, punched several times in the face and in the body by Sello. These two separate incidents of domestic violence occurred at their Kibler Park home, south of Johannesburg. She sustained injuries to her face, stomach and legs after the assault. Later Sebotsane was charged with domestic violence and assault with intent to do grievous bodily harm. The court case was opened in 2016 at Mondeor police station in Johannesburg.

== Career ==
In 1994, he made his film debut with the role "Jim Makokela" in the film Jock: A True Tale of Friendship co-directed by Danie Joubert and Duncan MacNeillie. Since then, he acted in the films such as; Panic Mechanic, Tarzan: The Epic Adventures, Orion's Key, Ernest Goes to Africa, Tarzan and the Lost City and CI5: The New Professionals.

In 2006, he made a recurring role as "Jacob" in the SABC3 drama series One Way where he appeared in two episodes. Then in 2007, he joined with the SABC2 Afrikaans serial Andries Plak. In 2006, he played the role "Philane" in the SABC2 sitcom Stokvel. The role became very popular and he continued to play the role until 2012 eighth season. In 2012, he appeared in the SABC3 comedy Those Who Can't with the role "Principal Ezekiel Dlamini", where he continued in the second season as well. In the same year, he played the role "Thabo Kekana" in the SABC2 drama Erfsondes and reprised the role in the second season. In 2008, he acted in the M-Net comedy series Van der Walt's Fault with the lead role of "Progress".

While playing in the serial Stokvel, he played the role "Bhekumuzinsizwe "The General" Letswalo" in another SABC2 sitcom Home Sweet Home in 2011. Then he appeared in the SABC2 parliamentary drama series 90 Plein Street and played the role "George Motha". In 2013, he joined with the cast of Mzansi Magic drama serial "Rockville" where he played the role "Pastor Morake" for four consecutive years until 2016. Then in 2016, he appeared in the second and third seasons of another Mzansi Magic drama serial Saints and Sinners with the role "Sbu Khumalo". Apart from those notable roles, he also appeared in many televisions serials and soapies with supportive and minor roles, including The No. 1 Ladies' Detective Agency, CI5: The New Professionals, Isidingo, Backstage, Scoop Schoombie, SOS, Madam and Eve, Hidden City, Egoli and Safe.

Apart from cinema and television, he performed in many theatre productions after joined with renowned theatre companies such as; Johannesburg Civic Theatre, Grahamstown Arts Festival and Market Theatre. His notable theatre plays are Scribble, Happy Natives, Cold Stone Jug, Sophiatown, Gugi Mzimba: The Spirit of Gerald Sekoto, The Mountaintop and The Amen Corner. For his role in the play Happy Natives, he received the Naledi Theatre Award for Best Supporting Actor.

== Filmography ==
Year	Film	Role	Genre	Ref.
1994	Jock: A True Tale of Friendship	Jim Makokela	Film	
1996	Tarzan: The Epic Adventures	Mbeko	Film	
1996	Panic Mechanic	Hijacker	Film	
1996	The Legend of the Hidden City	Oteth	TV series	
1996	Orion's Key	Sergeant Makojane	Film	
1997	Ernest Goes to Africa	Bazoo	Video	
1998	Tarzan and the Lost City	Dube	Film	
1999	CI5: The New Professionals	Cap'n	Film	
2000	Soul Buddyz	Chairman	TV series	
2005	Mazinyo dot Q	Mr Big	TV series	
2006	Stokvel	Philane Phiri	TV series	
2006	One Way	Jacob	TV series	
2007	Andries Plak	Mayor	TV series	
	Backstage	Peter	TV series	
2007	Erfsondes	Thabo Kekana	TV series	
2008	Van der Walt's Fault	Progress	TV series	
2009	The No. 1 Ladies' Detective Agency	Reverend Shadrack	TV series	
2011	90 Plein Street	George Motha	TV series	
2011	Home Sweet Home	Bhekumuzinsizwe Letswalo	TV series	
2011	Jacob's Cross	Wild Dog	TV series	
2012	Those Who Can't	Principal Ezekiel Dlamini	TV series	
2013	Rockville	Pastor Morake	TV series	
2013	Safe As Hauser's	Mr Mamabolo	TV series	
2015	Tremors 5: Bloodlines	Thaba	Film	
2016	Greed & Desire	Atleha	TV series	
2016	Saints and Sinners	Sbu Khumalo	TV series	
2016	Sokhulu & Partners	Henry Ndana	TV series	
2017	Broken Vows	Ace	TV series	
2018	The Throne	Judge	TV series	
	Isidingo	Bra Fox	TV series	
2019	Trackers	John Burger	TV series	
2020	Löwenzahn - Abenteuer in Südafrika	Polizist	TV movie	
2020	Löwenzahn	Polizist	TV series	
2020	Vutha	Skhonjane	TV series	
2020	Kings of Jo'burg	Stan Mazibuko	TV series	
2021	House of Zwide	Detective Jonas	TV series	
2021	Ak'siSpaza	Bra Pantsula	TV series	
