= Johannes Dinkwanyane =

Johannes Dinkwanyane (died 1876) was a member of the Pedi royal family, who was a leading early convert to Christianity. He was the half-brother of the Pedi king Sekhukhune.

Initially opposed by his brother as ruler, Dinkwanyane converted to Lutheran Christianity in 1864 under the guidance of the Berlin Missionary Society and its missionaries Alexander Merensky and Albert Nachtigal. He resided for some time at the Botshabelo mission station, but later left due to cultural disputes with the mission staff, principally because of frustrations over the lack of authority given to Africans in the mission and the manner in which Christian converts were expected to abandon their indigenous culture and religious practices.

Johannes Dinkwanyane died of wounds after battle with Swazi and Afrikaners at Mafolofolo in July 1876.
