= Skeem Saam =

South African television soap opera

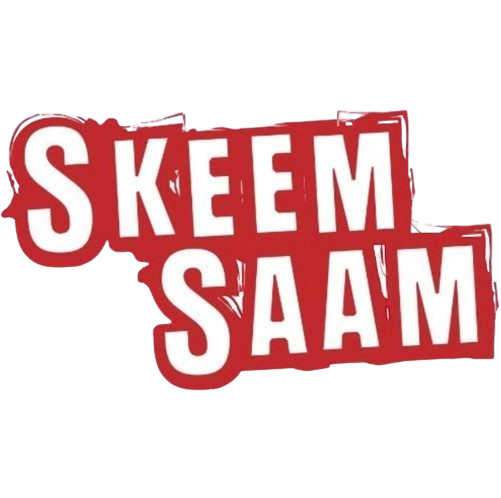
- Logo used since Season 12 (2023-present)
- Genre: Soap opera
- Created by: Winnie Serite
- Written by: Sibusiso Mamba; Spha Madondo; Zola Hlungwani; Masutang Rasakele; Joseph Senosi; Innocentia Tshipota; Kgomotso Aphane; Kelton Senyosi; Sibusisiwe Gugu Manqele
- Starring: Harriet Manamela; Africa Tsoai; Clement Maosa; Hungani Ndlovu; Dieketseng Mnisi; Elizabeth Serunye; Mogau Motlhatswi; Putla Sehlapelo; Cedric Fourie; Masilo Magoro; Eric Macheru; Amanda Manku; Lerato Marabe; Lesego Marakalla; Matthews Manamela; Patrick Seleka; Molobane Maja; Lebogang Elephant; Hellen Motsuki; Vele Manenje; Vusi Leremi; Samukele Mkhize; Lebogang Chidi; Oratile Maitisa; Innocent Sadiki; Thabiso Molokomme; Philip Thobejane; Mahlatse Moropo; Mosa Nkwashu; Zizo Sobhutyu; Rorisang Mathatho; Johanna Molotsi; Busisiwe Nyundu; Lunga Mofokeng; Rethabile Mothapo; Mortimer Williams; Tshepo Joseph Senatle; Sebasa Mogale; Lethabo Matsetela; Brendan Maphake; Patrick Bokaba; Anton Decker; Thabang Leboa; James Pilkington; Tisetso Thoka; Nyaniso Dzedze; Sam Shale
- Theme music composer: Tuks Senganga
- Opening theme: "Bona Fela" by Tuks
- Ending theme: "Bona Fela" by Tuks
- Country of origin: South Africa
- Original languages: Sepedi; English; Zulu; Sotho
- No. of seasons: 13
- No. of episodes: 3,380

Production
- Executive producer: Winnie Serite
- Producer: Debbie Strumpher
- Production locations: Polokwane Turfloop, Johannesburg
- Running time: 30 minutes (incl. Commercials)
- Production company: PEU Communication Solutions

Original release
- Network: SABC 1
- Release: 2011 – present

Skeem Saam is a South African soap opera created by Winnie Serite and has been broadcast on SABC 1 since 2011. The show is set in Johannesburg and Turfloop. It rose to fame since it arrived, competing with Generations. A majority youth-centered show, Skeem Saam is an SABC Education production. It has been running for 10 seasons. In January 2021, the SABC announced that the show would go on a production break starting from 1 March 2021 due to a massive decline in viewership.

== Plot ==
The story follows the lives of the residents of Turfloop who face daily trials and tribulations as they climb the ladder to success. It also follows the lives of the rich in Johannesburg and how they handle the challenges they face in their businesses and also follows the lives of the rich and poor staying in Turfloop.

== Cast shown in opening credits ==
- Clement Maosa
- Hungani Ndlovu
- Samukele Mkhize
- Dieketseng Mnisi
- Thabiso Molokomme
- Phillip Thobejane
- Putla Sehlapelo
- Cedric Fourie
- Chester gun man

== Cast and characters ==
=== Main cast ===
Character	Portrayed by	Status
Paxton Kgomo	Thabiso Molokomme	Main
Mahlatse Kunutu	Phillip Thobejane	Main
Rachel Kunutu	Lesego Marakalla	Main
Meikie Maputla	Harriet Manamela	Main
John Maputla	Africa Tsoai	Main
Zamokuhle "Kwaito" Seakamela-Maputla	Clement Maosa	Main
Thabo "Tbose" Maputla	Hungani Ndlovu	Main
Julie "MaNtuli" Seakamela	Dieketseng Mnisi	Main
Jacobeth Thobakgale	Elizabeth Serunye	Main
Mapitsi Magongwa-Maputla	Mogau P. Keebine	Main
Alfred Magongwa	Putla Sehlapelo	Main
Lehasa Maphosa	Cedric Fourie	Main
Charles Kunutu	Masilo Magoro	Main
Leeto Maputla	Eric Macheru	Main
Dr. Elizabeth Thobakgale	Amanda Manku	Supporting Role
Pretty Seakamela	Lerato Marabe	Supporting Role
Captain Enos Babeile	Matthews Manamela	Supporting Role
Ivy Kgomo	Molobane Maja	Supporting Role
Obed Kgomo	Lebogang Elephant	Supporting Role
Melita Monama-Kgomo	Hellen Motsuki	Supporting Role
Katlego Petersen	Patrick Seleka	Supporting Role
Marothi Maphuthuma	Macks Senata sa ga Papo	Supporting Role
Letetswe Kunutu	Mahlatse Moropo	Supporting Role
Khwezikazi Gasela	Samukele Mkhize	Supporting Role
Chester	Mosa Nkwashu	Supporting Role

=== Former cast ===
Character	Portrayed by	Status
Celia Kunutu-Magongwa	Shoki Mmola	Starring role
Koko Mantsha Ramabu	Lydia Mokgokoloshi	Starring role
Thabo Maputla	Cornet Mamabolo	Starring role
Nompumelelo Mthiyane	Amanda Du-Pont	Starring role
Big Boy Mabitela	Charles Maja	Starring role
Mokgadi Maputla	Pebetsi Nolo Matlaila	Starring role
Fanie Maseremule	Gift Mokhampanyane	Starring role
Mangaliso Sangweni	Bongani Madondo	Starring role
Sonti Magongwa	Pearl Maimela	Starring role
Charity Ramabu	Makgofe Moagi	Starring role
Pop Nkanana	Kgagi Kwataile	Recurring
Mbal'Enhle Tango	Natasha Thahane	Starring role
Ayanda	Nozuko Ngcayiya	Starring role
Sis' Ouma	Nokuzola Mlengana	Starring role
Seakamela	Patrick Shai	Supporting role
Molahlegi Magongwa	Tsholofelo Matshaba	Recurring
Kelebogile Kgomo	Mathema Kgomo	Recurring
Tumishang	Mothusi Magano	Recurring
Sphola	Thahane Lefoa	Recurring
Sakhile Mkhize	Nicholas Nkuna	Supporting role
Noah Matloga	Austin Rethabile Mothapo	Supporting role
Constance Shibambo	Nakedi Leshabane	Recurring
Jama	Oros Mampofu	Main
Emkay	Mlungisi Mathe	Main

== Achievements ==
=== South Africa Film and Television Awards ===
Year	Nominee / work	Award	Result	Ref.
2024	Skeem Saam	Most Popular TV Soap/Telenovela	Nominated	
2024	Skeem Saam	Best TV Soap	Won	
2024	Mmoni Moabi, Percy Maboane, Ricardo Klassen & Kgomotso Lebakeng	Best Achievement in Directing - TV Soap	Won	
2024	Khomotjo Aphane, Myrah Molokamme, Metsa Makhwidiri, Joseph Senosi, Kelton Sinyosi, Sibusisiwe Manqele, Siphamandla Madondo & Zola Hlungwani	Best Achievement in Scriptwriting - TV Soap	Won	
