= Maponya Mall =

Shopping centre in Soweto, South Africa

Coordinates: 26.258715°S 27.902045°E

Maponya Mall is a shopping centre in Soweto, South Africa. The 65,000 square-metre development cost R650m to build and officially opened in September 2007. The mall was owned by South African entrepreneur and property developer Richard Maponya until his death in early January 2020 under The Maponya group in partnership with Investec and ZenProp property holdings.
