= S v Ndlovu =

South African legal case

In S v Ndlovu; S v Sibisi (2005), the appellants objected that further to the standard basic explanation provided them of their rights to legal representation, they had not

- been informed of the minimum sentences they prospectively faced;
- been encouraged to seek legal representation; or
- been asked why they declined to seek legal representation.

The court held that it was an essential step that an accused be promptly informed of his rights in regard to legal representation and where the failure to provide that standard basic explanation had the effect of depriving the accused of legal representation, the proceedings would be vitiated by fundamental irregularity.

Furthermore, the court held that in special circumstances, it was essential that an accused be given such information further to the standard basic explanation: namely, information as to the seriousness of the charge and as to the applicable minimum sentence, if that information were reasonably required to enable the accused to make a sufficiently informed decision regarding whether to seek legal representation.

Special circumstances existed, for example, where an accused was tried in the regional magistrate's court for an offense which carried a prospective life imprisonment.

The provision of further information would only be essential to the extent that it was reasonably required to enable the accused to make a sufficiently informed decision on legal representation. It would thus not be essential to inform the accused that he was facing the possibility of a substantial prison sentence if he could reasonably be expected to be aware of it.

Furthermore, even where it was not essential to inform the accused of the prescribed sentence, it remained desirable whenever the charge was a serious one.

An accused must also be afforded a reasonable time within which to obtain legal representation and a reasonable opportunity to make up his mind whether to seek legal representation.

Furthermore, if an accused persists in declining to seek legal representation, the court must ask him why.

A presiding officer should, however, be careful to respect the right of an accused to choose to conduct his own defense.

== Notes ==
- S v Ndlovu; S v Sibisi 2005 (2) SACR 645 (W)
- (2006) 99 Servamus 72
