= Shoki Mmola =

South African actress and translator

- Born: Reshoketswe Portia Mmola; 10 August 1977 (age 48); Tzaneen, South Africa
- Education: Prudens Secondary; Tshwane University of Technology
- Occupations: actress; translator; language advisor; dubbing producer; casting director
- Years active: 1996–Present
- Spouse: Sello Sebotsane(div)
- Children: Oratilwe Kutloano Sebotsane

Shoki Mmola (born 10 August 1977) is a South African actress. She is known for her acting role of Celia Kunutu the mother and stepmother of Rachel Kunutu and Nimrod Kunutu respectively in the soap, Skeem Saam.

== Personal life ==
Shoki was born in Tzaneen. She attended Prudens Secondary school and further her studies at Tshwane University of Technology.

She was married to fellow actor and producer Sello Sebotsane. The couple has a daughter, Oratile Kutlwano. In 2018, Shoki was strangled twice, punched several times in the face and in the body by Sello. These two separate incidents of domestic violence occurred at their Kibler Park home, south of Johannesburg. She sustained injuries to her face, stomach and legs after the assault. Later Sebotsane was charged with domestic violence and assault with intent to do grievous bodily harm. The court case was opened in 2016 at Mondeor police station in Johannesburg.

== Awards and nominations ==
She was nominated for the Golden Horn Award for Best Actress in a Lead Role in a TV Drama.

== Filmography ==
Year	Title	Role	Note
	Death of a Queen	Grace Lerothodi	
	eKasi: Our Stories	Mapula	
	Mfolozi Street	Matshidiso Mofokeng	
	Muvhango	Tumi	
	My Perfect Family	Dawn	
	Rhythm City	Patricia	
	Skeem Saam	Celia Magongwa	
