= National African Federated Chamber of Commerce =

The National African Federated Chamber of Commerce is a South African member body formed in 1964, which focused on the upliftment of black business people during Apartheid. It claims a membership of several hundred thousand and controls substantial investment funds.

== Background ==
It was formed in Johannesburg in 1964 to promote black entrepreneurship and businesses. Its origins are from a 1955 organisation, the African Chamber of Commerce. It was restructured a national organisation in 1969 with regional branches. Its founding president was the highly venerated late businessman, Richard Maponya. Prominent businessman, Patrice Motsepe is a former president, with the presidency currently (2020) occupied by prominent businessman Sabelo Macingwane who is also a former CEO of the organisation.

== Aims ==
The organisation had the following aims:

- scrapping of discriminate measures against black business people
- development of black capital
- help establish a black middle-class
