= Clement Maosa =

South African actor, lawyer, musician and radio DJ

Clement Moasa
- Born: 9 May 1988 (age 38); Polokwane, South Africa
- Education: University of Limpopo
- Occupations: actor, radio DJ; model; musician
- Years active: 2011–present
- Known for: Skeem Saam

Clement Maosa (born 9 May 1988) is a South African DJ and actor, most famous for playing the role of Zamokuhle Seakamela in the SABC1 soap opera, Skeem Saam.

== Early life and education ==
He is from Polokwane, Limpopo, South Africa. He attended school in Ga-Rammutla village and later studied law at the University of Limpopo.

When Clement was young, he wanted to become a soldier, but during high school he decided to pursue acting instead. He grew up in Bochum alongside his parents, two sisters, and a younger brother.

== Career ==
Clement's career highlights include the month he served his articles as a candidate attorney, some road shows and promotions with a commercial radio station in Limpopo and when he was registered as a model with Rezo-Lution and Media Management. He has recently shared a stage with DJ Bongz and other South African stars where his skills in dancing were exposed. He is also known for hosting birthday extravaganza parties where South African celebrities converge and enjoy themselves. 2016, was his second time organising it.

His involvement with Skeem Saam was his big break. "I saw a notification on Facebook from Mzansi fo sho about the auditions. I travelled from Limpopo to audition and fortunately I got the role".

== Filmography ==
- Skeem Saam

== Achievements ==
=== South Africa Film and Television Awards ===
Year	Nominee / work	Award	Result	Ref.
2024	Himself	Best Supporting Actor in a TV Soap	Pending	

=== National Film and Television Awards ===
Year	Nominee / work	Award	Result	Ref.
2024	Himself	Celebrity Personality of the Year 2024	Pending	
