= Hungani Ndlovu =

South African actor and DJ

Hungani Malcolm Ndlovu
- Born: Hungani Ndlovu; 19 June 1994 (age 31); Mpumalanga, South Africa
- Other names: DJ Grizi
- Occupations: Actor, dancer, MC, presenter and DJ
- Years active: 2001–present
- Spouse: Stephanie Sandows (m. 2019) (div. 2025)

Hungani Malcolm Ndlovu (born 19 June 1994, in Mpumalanga) is a South African actor and dancer. He is a Tsonga actor best known for his roles in the television serials Memoir of an Honest Voice, Sipho and Scandal! Recently started with his DJ experience as DJ Grizi. He currently plays the recast role of Tbose on Skeem Saam.

== Personal life ==
He was born on 19 June 1994, in Mpumalanga, South Africa. Both his parents are of Tsonga descent.

He was married to fellow South African actress, and TV presenter Stephanie Ndlovu. The wedding was secretly celebrated on 23 February 2019. The couple announced their separation in June 2025 calling it quit after 6 years of marriage.

== Career ==
He started his career in 2001 when he was seven years old. He was good at dancing, but later turned to be an actor. With the objective to be an actor, he moved to USA and graduated in HipHop Choreography from Flii'Cademy, Los Angeles. He is also very popular in social media under the name, 'Sbujwa dance' in which he posted dancing videos. During his studies at Flii'Cademy, he trained under renowned choreographer, FliiStylz for three years. He also studied at New York Film Academy and passed an Associated Degree in Acting for Film.

After returning to South Africa, he started acting career. His first appearance was a lead role in the film, Memoir of an Honest Voice in 2014. The film later won the Best Short Film award at the Africa Movie Academy Awards in 2015. In 2016, he joined the cast for popular television serial Scandal! and played the role 'Romeo'. Meanwhile, he also appeared in the film Because You are Black. Then he played the lead role in music video Black Coffee.

He is the co-founder of an NPO coaching center, 'The Ndlovu Foundation' which helps to youth to achieve their goals through dancing and drama. He is also a pioneer to establish an art development studio, Strong Attitudes Nurture Success Group (SANS).

In 2016, he appeared in two stage plays: A Raisin in the Sun and A Night with Sam. In 2018, he acted in the film Sipho and then HEKS in 2019.

In July 2023, SABC 1's Skeem Saam announced that Hungani will be replacing Cornet Mamabolo as T'bose (Thabo Maputla).

Television

Year	Film	Role	Genre	Ref.
2014	Memoir of an Honest Voice	Soldier Babyface	Short film	
2016	Because You're Black	Man at Bar	Short film	
2016–2020	Scandal!	Romeo Medupe	TV series	
2018	Sipho		Film	
2019	HEKS	Bandile	Film	
2023–present	Skeem Saam	Thabo "Tbose" Maputla	TV series	
