= Nyabêla =

- King Nyabêla of the Ndebele
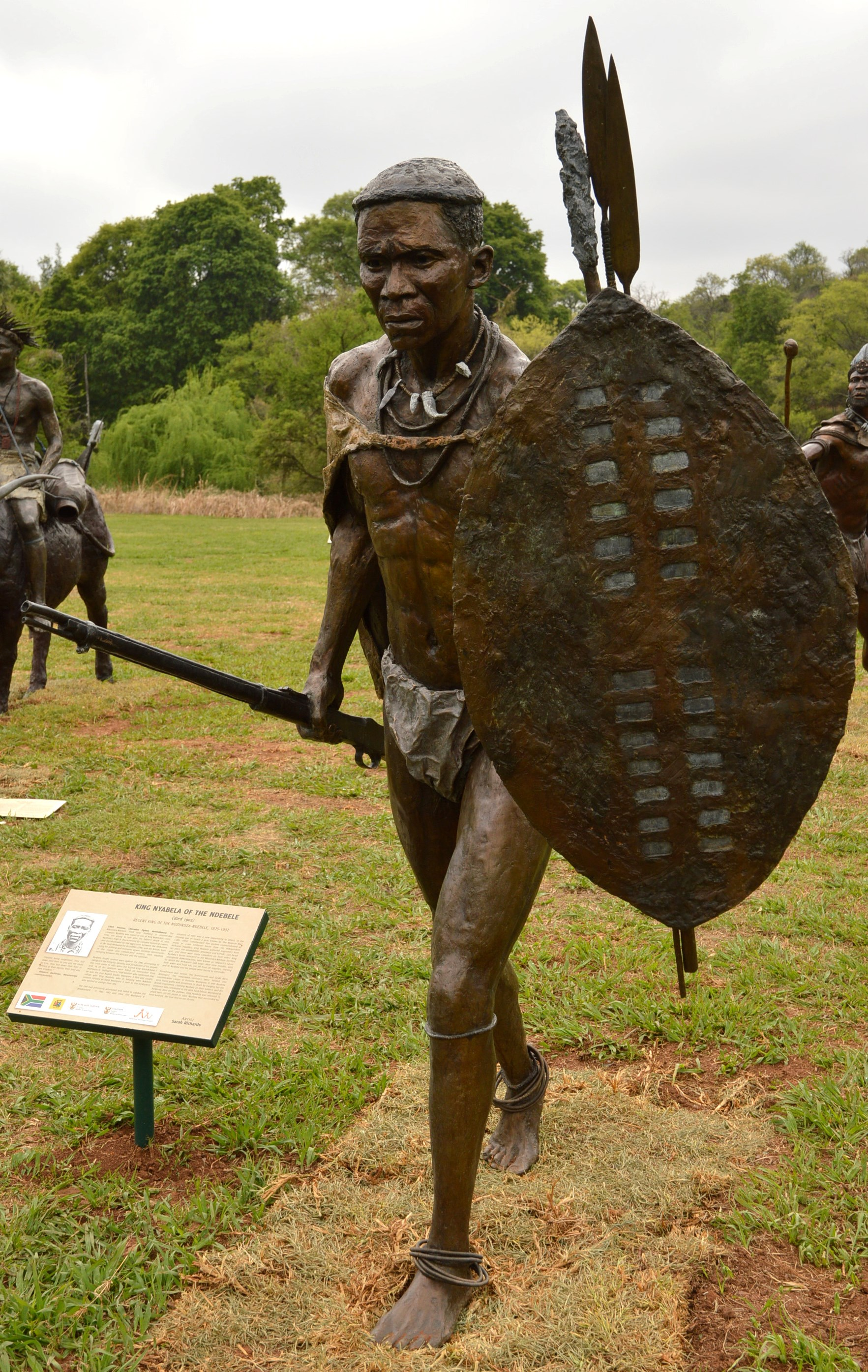
- Nyabêla bronze statue by Sarah Richards.
- Died: 1902

Nyabela (1825/30 - 1902) also known in Afrikaans as Niabel, was a chief of the Ndzundza-Ndebele during the nineteenth century. He is remembered for his struggle against whites for control of his tribe's own territory.

== Origin ==
Nyabêla's ancestors probably moved from the southeast coast of Africa to the Highveld in the sixteenth or seventeenth century and settled near the later Pretoria. These people were later called the Ndebele of Transvaal. Nowadays we call them the Ndebele of South Africa. One of their chiefs, Ndzundza, moved to the Steelpoort Valley in Mpumalanga. After many hardships, this part of the tribe went to live at a place along the Steelpoort River called KoNomtsharhelo. KoNomtsharhelo was later surveyed as the farm Mapochsgronde. It surrounds the present town of Roossenekal.

Nyabêla's father, Mapoch (now called Mabhoko or Mapog) was the chief of the tribe when the emigrants (later called Voortrekkers or Boers ) invaded the area in 1845. In 1860 the Boers allotted four farms (about the present Mapochs lands) to the Mapochs (now also called the Mapoggers). But the area occupied by the tribe was larger and still growing. They again waged war, but in 1865 peace was made when the Boers recognized that a much larger area belonged to the Mapoggers.

Mapoch died in 1865 and two of his sons succeeded him. The British annexed the Transvaal in 1877. In 1879, Mapoch's chief wife's third son, Nyabela, took over the reins of the Mapog tribe. At that time there were already several chiefs under him and he could be considered chief. His subjects called him Ingwenyama.

The British, meanwhile, defeated Sekhukhune and put him in jail. In 1881 the Boers defeated the British. The latter two fighters entered into the Pretoria Convention. The convention contained two provisions that had a catastrophic effect on Nyabela and the Mapoggers. According to one provision, Sekhukhune had to be released. The convention also stipulated that a location commission be appointed to measure locations for all black tribes in the Transvaal.

== Location ==
After the first Anglo-Boer War, on 3 August 1881, the warriors signed the Pretoria Convention. In terms of sections 21 and 22 thereof, a Native Location Commission had to be appointed to demarcate locations for black tribes. The commission consisted of Commandant-General Piet Joubert, the British Resident, one Hudson, and Hendrik Jacobus Schoeman, the Native Commissioner of Heidelberg and Pretoria. They decided to immediately work on the location for the Mapoggers.

The commission arrived in Middelburg on 1 October 1882. Nyabêla was instructed by letter to meet the commission on October 6 on the farm of Dirk Stoffberg, just below Bothasberg. Nyabêla was also requested to provide the commission with information on the number of huts, livestock and subjects. Grové, the native commissioner of Middelburg, and field cornet were sent by letter to Nyabêla. According to Grové, who went to deliver the letter, Nyabêla angrily hit the ground with his staff and said: "Go and get Piet, and I will talk to him." The Piet he is referring to is of course Piet Joubert. According to Nyabêla: "I will not let my flocks and herds come down; even less will I give up the number of my people. Tell Piet he must come here himself and then I will slaughter an ox for him." Grové tried to persuade Nyabêla to go to the Location Commission and even promised to bring him back to his stat, but Nyabêla did completely refused and repeated that Grové had to bring Piet. He adds that Nyabêla also said that he found it strange that the commission did not want to come to him. If he, Nyabêla, went to Pretoria to see Paul Kruger or to meet Piet Joubert, he does not stop halfway there.

The commission meanwhile arrived at Dirk Stoffberg's farm on 5 October. During their meeting that day, Grové reported that Nyabêla refused to come to Stoffberg and insisted that the commission should come to his stat. The commission then discussed the matter and decided that it was impossible for the commission to take further action, given the position of the commissioners and the reports received by them. Thereupon Hudson offered to go to Nyabêla himself the next day. However, the other two commissioners made it clear that he could not go there in his capacity as commissioner.

The next day, Grové and Field Cornet accompanied Trichard Hudson to Erholweni. To Trichard, the interpreter, Nyabêla asked: "Fanis, what are you doing here with your looted Englishman, why do you say to me this is one Captain, why did you not bring Piet?" Trichard laughed and Hudson asked him what Nyabêla had said. Nyabêla did not want Trichard to interpret his words to Hudson and then asked Trichard to tell Hudson that they should go to his office so that what Hudson When they arrived at Nyabela's counselors, when they arrived at Nyabela's office, Nyabela said that his counsel was complete and that Hudson could only speak. Nyabela was not present. He usually chaired such meetings. Nyabela replied that his absence had nothing to do with Trichard. Hudson then said that he was the Resident and the man appointed by Her Majesty's Government. is to ensure that everything goes well between the natives and the Transvaal. Then he had to tell the truth. Nyabêla then said to Trichard: "Ask him where Her Majesty is." When Hudson made this clear to Nyabela, Nyabela replied, "Tell Hudson that we have nothing to do with Her Majesty in this country. She is too far away; we are working out these matters ourselves." When Hudson asked Nyabêla if he knew that he was also under government authority, Nyabêla replied: "I do not know that I am under a government, but I know that I am the government's partner." Hudson then said he regretted trying to persuade Nyabêla to come to the Location Commission. The Commission was sent to survey a location for him. The Commission would do that and the beacons would be erected. Nyabêla then asked what was this beacon line that Hudson was talking about. Hudson then had to return to Bothasberg for unfinished business.

== March ==
Sekhukhune was the chief of the Bapedi, a tribe that lived between the Olifants and Steelpoort rivers. His half-brother, Mampuru's henchmen killed Sekhukhune on August 13, 1882. After that, Mampuru went into hiding in various places and launched attacks against chiefs who were sympathetic to the Boers or Sekhukhune. Piet Joubert, the Commandant-General of the Zuid-Afrikaansche Republiek (ZAR), called on all the ZAR's commandos in early October 1882 to capture Mampuru and bring him to Pretoria. His route took him past Middelburg in the direction of the Steelpoort Valley.

Joubert and the commandos reached the farm Hoedspruit on 29 October 1882. It was about 30 kilometers southeast of Erholweni. While the commando was at Hoedspruit, Nyabêla's fighting general, Swaas, and his interpreter, Kleinbooi, arrived at the army. There are several versions of events. The following is Joubert's version. Nyabêla sent him a message to find out if Joubert wanted to take action against him. If Joubert wanted to fight him, he had to say it openly and not stalk him. Joubert replied that he had been sent to fetch Mampuru and even if Nyabêla swallowed or hid him in his stomach, Joubert would have to take him out. He added that it was the duty of every citizen of the state to work together to uphold the law and punish murderers.

The following is Kleinbooi's version. Nyabêla sent him to the general at Hoedspruit to say that the commando should not pass near Nyabêla's stat. Nyabêla did not want to make war and the women and children would be frightened if the commando came near them. The general replied that he had not marched against Nyabêla, but that he was hunting Mampuru. Even if Mampuru was behind Nyabela's shoulder, he would come and pick him up. Then that general said to Swaziland, "Tell your brother, Nyabela, if Mamphore is in his belly, I will come and get him." The general also said wherever Mampuru may be, even in the air, then he would fetch Mampuru. Thereupon Swaas and Kleinbooi repeated that Nyabêla did not help Mampuru. "He is not our nation and we do not want war." The General then asked which road was the shortest road to Mampuru. Kleinbooi replied that the road past them was very bad, but that a detour past their stat was the better road.

By 3 November, Joubert's camp was at Blinkwater or Laersdrif, about 15 kilometers from Erholweni. There, Joubert decides to send an ultimatum to Nyabêla. In it, Joubert calls on Nyabêla in the name of the people and government of the Republic to meet some of Joubert's officers on horseback at or about an hour from the main camp with two or three of his chief councilors in order to find out what the cause is that the wishes of the government are not heeded. Joubert also warns Nyabêla what the consequences of his refusal could be for his tribe, namely that it would be seen as resistance and rebellion against the legal authority and that it would then be suppressed by force. Otto Riedl, the former commander of the artillery, delivered the ultimatum. He was kindly received by Nyabêla and was even offered beer and meat as refreshments. Riedl read the ultimatum to Nyabêla and explained its contents to him. Nyabela indicated that he did not want to visit the general because he was sick and scared, but that he would send his chief general, an interpreter, and some dignitaries the next day to negotiate. Some of Nyabêla's advisers advised him to go to the general himself, but he still refused. Riedl then issued a pass to them to visit the army the next morning and he left back to camp to report to the Commanding General. On Sunday 5 November, the interpreter (Kleinbooi) and three other subordinates of Nyabêla arrive at one of the Boers' outposts, about half an hour on horseback from the main camp. They were not allowed to approach, but were told that "if Nyabêla himself does not come, no other Kaffir will have to come." That envoy then returned to Nyabêla's stat.

The Mapoch War then began.

== Mapo War ==
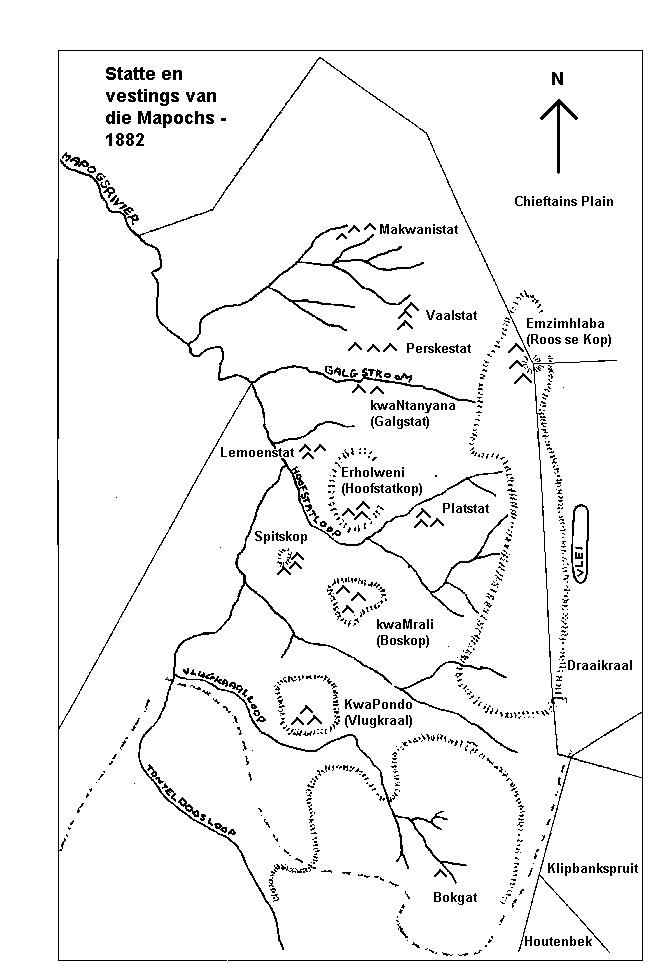
Battlefield in October 1882.

The first battle of the war took place on November 7 when the Mapoggers scraped 96 of the Boers' oxen. On November 8, Joubert sent a message to Nyabêla to get his wounded out of the field. Nyabêla replied that he was fighting and would take care of those who were with him, but those who died in the field could only watch the vultures.

On Sunday, November 19, Nyabêla sends three of his followers, Kleinbooi, Jonas, and Esau, to the Commandant-General to inform him that Nyabêla no longer wanted to fight and that he wanted peace. They bring a white ox. "The ox is his mouth to come and talk to the General," informs that messenger Joubert. Nyabêla requests the general to send Klaas and another white man to hear Nyabêla's opinion. Nyabêla herself is too scared to come to the general. Joubert told the messengers that he was not prepared to negotiate with subordinates. If Nyabêla wanted to negotiate, he and his general had to come out and talk to the general in person. The messengers would have told the general that Nyabêla was afraid that Joubert would lock him up, as with Sekhukhune and Cetswayo happened. Joubert's first purpose was to take Vlugkraal. Joubert himself led the attack on Vlugkraal. The target was first softened with three cannons and the civilians stormed. They advanced into the stat, but were then driven back by heavy gunfire. Thereafter, the commandos preferred to build five stone forts around the stat and throw dynamite into the caves. Far north of the Mapoggers' heartland, one of the commandos attacked Mampoerskop on 5 December, but Mampuru escaped and fled to Makwanistat.

In January 1883 the Boers launched two more attacks on Vlugkraal, but still could not succeed in capturing the stat. They began to destroy the Mapoggers' fields and plunder their livestock. They also erected more forts in the vicinity of the statte. In February, they attacked Makwani state, but failed to capture it. On 19 February the Boers found out that the Mapoggers had left Vlugkraal.

In March, Nyabêla tried to make peace again. First, he sends messengers to persuade Native Commissioner SP Grové to act as mediator. Grové refuses, however. A few days later Kleinbooi and a few others arrive in the main camp. Commandant Fourie spoke to them. Kleinbooi says that Nyabêla has asked for peace four times already, but has not obtained it. Nyabêla asks that a person be sent to him to hear Nyabêla's word. Nyabêla does not trust his own messengers to properly convey everything he has to say. Nyabêla was willing to pay all expenses of the war, but then his own freedom had to be guaranteed. Commandant Fourie informed the messengers that only unconditional surrender would be accepted.

The Boers continue to destroy fields, plunder livestock and build forts. On April 5, Makwanistat is attacked again but the Boers do not succeed in capturing it. On April 8, Nyabela's peacekeepers arrive in the main camp again. They are told by the general that Nyabêla had to come out and if that did not happen, they could not expect any further mercy from the government; if Nyabêla surrendered and made confession, his life would be spared and his people would be allowed to get a dwelling.

By the end of June 1883, the Mapoggers were finally completely surrounded, destroying their fields and driving away their livestock. On July 6, 1883, Kleinbooi arrived in the main camp with a white flag. He says Nyabêla wanted to know if he could get peace if Mampuru was extradited. Joubert's response was that negotiations could only begin after Mampuru was handed over. The next morning, a group of warriors approached the main camp under a white flag. With them was a prisoner with his hands tied behind his back. The prisoner was Mampuru. Within a week, Nyabela and his chiefs came out. The war lasted eight months. Mampuru, Nyabêla and some chiefs were taken to Pretoria for trial.

== Trial by the Zuid-Afrikaansche Republiek ==
Mampuru was tried on September 17, 1883 on charges of murder of Sekhukhune, public violence and rioting. He was sentenced to death. On September 21, 1883, Nyabêla appeared before Judge JG Kotze and a jury of eight white men on the grounds that he was a subject of the South African Republic, illegally, maliciously, with premeditated and malicious intent, violated public peace and tranquility by resisting and defying the legitimate authority of the Republic, and taking up arms, carrying and using at the head of his armed sub-captains and his people, with the aim of resisting the legitimate authority of the ZAR. Acting State Attorney Carl Ueckermann observed the prosecution, while Advocate Cooper acted for Nyabêla pro Deo.

After reading the indictment, Advocate Cooper told the court that Nyabêla's defense would not be aimed at the facts in the indictment, but would primarily be that the relationship of state and subject between the Government of the ZAR and Nyabela did not exist and that Nyabela was always an independent captain. A plea of not guilty was recorded by the court. Six witnesses were called by the state: State Secretary Eduard Bok, Native Commissioner SP Grové, Field Cornet SP Trichard, General Joubert, Commandant Weilbach and Kleinbooi. Joubert failed to report that his ultimatum was sent to Nyabêla before the commando's oxen were driven away. Kleinbooi was not asked about the ultimatum.

The only dispute in the trial was therefore whether or not Nyabêla was a citizen of the Republic. In the first place, the prosecution relied on an agreement on 28 March 1860 with Mabhoko. Under this agreement, Mabhoko would have acknowledged that he was a citizen of the Republic. Cooper's response to this testimony was that the agreement was not binding on Nyabela. Second, Ueckermann has a proclamation from Sir Hercules Robinson, in which he announced that the rights and obligations of all natives would remain the same after the signing of the Pretoria Convention. Cooper argues that Nyabêla was not present when Sir Hercules addressed the chiefs and therefore the proclamation did not apply to him. He also claims that Nyabêla never paid taxes and therefore he had to be considered an independent chief. Ueckermann's response to this was that the non-payment of taxes was not proof of independence. In any case, Kleinbooi testified that Nyabêla admitted to Shepstone that he was a "Government Supplier" and therefore had to pay return. However, the defense had no effective answer to the state's argument that Nyabêla started the war by taking down the Boers' oxen. Ueckermann's only answer was that Nyabêla should then be considered a prisoner of war and that he had already spent some time in prison. In summing up the evidence before the jury, the judge said that Nyabêla lived near Middelburg, within the borders of the Republic, and was therefore a subject of the Republic.

The jury unanimously ruled that Nyabêla was guilty of the crime charged with him. When Nyabêla was asked if he wanted to say anything before the death sentence was pronounced, he replied that he had asked for peace no less than ten times. At this the death sentence was pronounced on him.

On Monday, September 24, 1883, 22 of Nyabêla's vice-captains were tried. Their names on the indictment were Matsitsi, Umbela, Magabalela, Elambies, Maboy, Magaloel, Maningi, T'komans, Boesman, Massloslobonka, Donnkolo alias Jonkman, Salempa, Pankalala, Makondoulo, Sekiti, Umlangoul, Umtmessa; Mandienda, Umbavi, Samokaloto, Mamoka and Wildebeest. Like Nyabêla, they were also charged with public violence and rioting. They were all convicted and sentenced to seven years in prison with hard labor.

Paul Kruger meanwhile left for London for talks on amendments to the Pretoria Convention and Piet Joubert acted as state president. The presiding judge drafted his report to the Executive Council on October 1 and sent it to them on October 7. After the judge summarized the facts and the arguments, he wrote that the law obliged him to pronounce the death sentence. But General Joubert stated in his testimony that he had sent a message to Nyabêla that if he did not surrender, he would die of a bullet in the head or of starvation in a hole. Could it not be that Nyabela thought his life would be spared if he surrendered? Because shortly thereafter, he surrendered. He therefore proposes that the Executive Council mitigate the death sentence. The Executive Council then decided to change Nyabêla's death sentence to life imprisonment with forced labor. Mampuru was not pardoned and they decided that he would be hanged on November 22, 1883.

Mampuru was hanged in the presence of Nyabêla on November 22, 1883. On the first try, the rope broke and he fell to the ground with a hard blow. He was hanged again immediately afterwards. Nyabêla was released in 1898 and went to live near Derdepoort in Pretoria. He died in 1903.
