= Gerald Ndlovu =

Zimbabwean footballer (born 1984)

Personal information
- Date of birth: 10 December 1984 (age 41)
- Position: Defender

Team information
- Current team: Hwange

Senior career*
Years	Team	Apps	(Gls)
2013–	Hwange		

International career^{‡}
2013	Zimbabwe	1	(0)
- * Club domestic league appearances and goals as of 13 November 2020 ‡ National team caps and goals as of 13 November 2020

Gerald Ndlovu (born 10 December 1984) is a Zimbabwean football defender who currently plays for Hwange.
