= Lydia Mokgokoloshi =

South African actress and educator (born 1939)

- Born: 27 September 1939 (age 86); Botlokwa, Polokwane, South Africa
- Occupations: Actress, educator
- Years active: 1980s–present
- Known for: Bophelo ke Semphekgo & Skeem Saam
- Children: 1
- Awards: 2017 Lifetime achievement award at the South African Film and Television awards

Lydia Mokgokoloshi (born 27 September 1939) is a South African actress, best known for her role as Koko Mantsha and the mother of Charity Ramabu and grandmother of Katlego (Kat) and Joseph(Jojo) in the SABC 1 soap, Skeem Saam. Her most notable role was as Mma Nkwesheng in the 1980s drama, Bophelo ke Semphekgo.

== Early life and education ==
She was born at a small village outside Polokwane called BOTLOKWA. She was a teacher before she got acting roles.

== Career ==
She is well known for acting as Mma Nkwesheng, an evil, cruel mother-in-law on the popular Pedi TV drama, Bophelo ke semphekgo. She has also acted in a number of TV dramas like Ngwanaka Okae, Muvhango, and currently in Skeem Saam.

== Filmography ==
=== Television ===
Year	Film	Role	Notes
	Muvhango		starring
1984	Ngwanaka O kae	Mmago-Rateka	Starring
2011–2020	Skeem Saam	Koko Mantsha	starring
1982	Bophelo Ke Semphekgo	Hunadi (Mmago-Nkwesheng)	Starring

== Awards and recognition ==
- 2017: Lifetime achievement award at the South African Film and Television awards
