= Stephanie Ndlovu =

South African actress

Stephanie Sandows
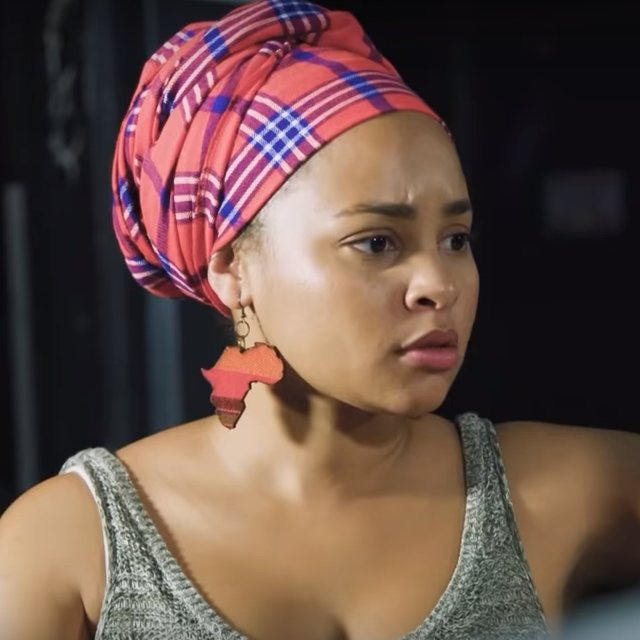
- Ndlovu appearing in an MTV Down South special in 2019
- Born: Stephanie Sandows; 29 October 1990 (age 35); Johannesburg, South Africa
- Education: University of Johannesburg
- Occupations: Actress; television presenter
- Known for: MTV Shuga
- Spouse: Hungani Ndlovu (m. 2019) (div... 2025)
- Children: 1

Stephanie Ndlovu (née Sandows; born 29 October 1990) is a South African television presenter and actress known for her appearances in the soap Scandal! and in the series MTV Shuga and YouTube channel "The Ndlovu's Uncut".

== Early life and career ==
Sandows was born in 1990 and she was educated at the University of Johannesburg. Whilst doing post graduate studies she was moonlighting by creating subtitles for the soap Scandal!. She asked the production team to be an extra and in time she was appearing frequently.

She was one of the hosts of e.tv's Craz-e kids' programmes with co-host Thulisile Phongolo.

Sandows was a presenter of the children's religious show, Bonisanani.

Sandows has played Ingrid, the daughter of Wesley Thompson (Zane Meas), in the South African soap opera Scandal!, since the end of 2015.

She was cast in the first series of the web series MTV Shuga as Tsholo. She was called back years later to appear in a special for them in 2019.

== Personal life ==
Sandows began a relationship with Hungani Ndlovu in 2016. Ndlovu, who portrays the character of Romeo on Scandal!, met her in 2015 as she became a new actor on the show. The two married privately in February 2019. In June 2025 the couple announced their divorce calling it an "end of marriage not friendship".
