= Richard Maponya =

South African businessman (1920–2020)

Richard Maponya GCOB
- Born: Richard John Pelwana Maponya; 24 December 1920; South Africa
- Died: 6 January 2020 (aged 99)
- Occupation: Businessman
- Years active: 1944 - 2020 (76 years)
- Organization: Maponya Developments
- Known for: Pioneer of black business in South Africa under apartheid
- Political party: ANC
- Awards: Order of the Baobab

Richard John Pelwana Maponya, GCOB, (24 December 1920 – 6 January 2020) was a South African entrepreneur and property developer best known for building a business empire despite the restrictions of apartheid and his determination to see the Soweto township develop economically.

== Early life ==
Maponya was born in Maponya Hill north of Limpopo, attended his primary school in Spitzkop and went to complete his Matric in Ga- Mamabolo.

== Career ==
At the age of 24, during World War II, he moved to Alexandra township in Johannesburg to take up a teaching post. When he got to Joburg, he bumped into his relative who told him there is a Department Store in Johannesburg CBD that is looking for a well educated Bantu South African.

He then took a job as a merchandiser in the department store. After three months into the job, he got promoted as a buyer for the store. He worked closely with his white manager in selecting clothes for black consumers.

The clothes was selling at a fast pace, subsequently his manager became top sales man in the department store. He was later promoted as a CEO of the company. Due to joint efforts of reaching such a high position, his white manager couldn't promote him as operational manager due to racial discrimination laws in South Africa. In gratitude, the manager sold Maponya soiled clothing and offcuts, which he resold in Soweto. With the capital acquired he attempted to open a clothing retailer in Soweto, but was blocked by the government's refusal to grant him a licence, despite intervention by the law firm created by Oliver Tambo and Nelson Mandela.

Instead, in the early 1950s, Maponya and his wife Marina (a cousin of Nelson Mandela) established the Dube Hygienic Dairy, which employed a fleet of boys on bicycles to deliver milk to customers in Soweto who had no access to electricity or refrigeration. By the 1970s the retail empire had grown to include several general stores, car dealerships and filling stations.

== Political activity ==
During the 1960s and 1970s Maponya was a member of the Urban Bantu Council. He resigned in 1977, shortly after youth affiliated with the African National Congress (ANC) requested that he do so, and shortly before the council offices were burnt to the ground.

In the 1960s he was a founding member and the first president of the National African Federated Chamber of Commerce (Nafcoc) and likewise the founder and chairman of the African Chamber of Commerce.

But some consider his boldest political move to have been his choice of horse-racing colors. As the first black person to be granted such colors in South Africa, Maponya chose green, gold and black, the colors of the ANC.

== Maponya Mall ==
On 27 September 2007 Richard Maponya opened the Maponya Mall in Soweto. It holds more than 200 stores and a cinema complex.

Maponya acquired the land where the mall is situated in 1979, at first as a 100-year lease. In 1994, after several attempts, he acquired it outright. Various attempts to finance construction failed until Maponya's holding company entered into a joint venture with Zenprop Property Holdings.

== Death ==
He died of old age on 6 January 2020 at the age of 99. He was laid to rest at the Westpark Cemetery on Tuesday 14 January 2020.

== Recognition ==
- Grand Counselor of the Baobab, April 2007
- Honorary Doctorate, Durban University of Technology, April 2015.
- Pioneer Award, South African Council of Shopping Centres, 2013.

== See also ==
- Soweto
