= Sipho Ndlovu =

Zimbabwean footballer (born 1994)

Personal information
- Full name: Sipho Owen Ndlovu
- Date of birth: 7 October 1994 (age 32)
- Place of birth: Zimbabwe
- Position: Midfielder

Team information
- Current team: Chicken Inn

Senior career*
Years	Team	Apps	(Gls)
2016–2018	Bulawayo City		
2018–2020	Chicken Inn		
2021–present	Bulawayo Chiefs		

International career^{‡}
2017–	Zimbabwe	1	(0)
- * Club domestic league appearances and goals ‡ National team caps and goals as of 14 December 2022

Sipho Owen Ndlovu (born 7 October 1994) is a Zimbabwean footballer who plays as a midfielder for Chicken Inn FC and the Zimbabwe national football team. He played for Bulawayo City F.C. between 2016 and 2018.

== Career ==
=== International ===
Ndlovu made his senior international debut on 26 March 2017 in a 0-0 friendly draw with Zambia.

== Career statistics ==
=== International ===
As of matches played 25 March 2021.

National team	Year	Apps	Goals
Zimbabwe	2017	1	0
Total		1	0
