= Harriet Manamela =

South African actress

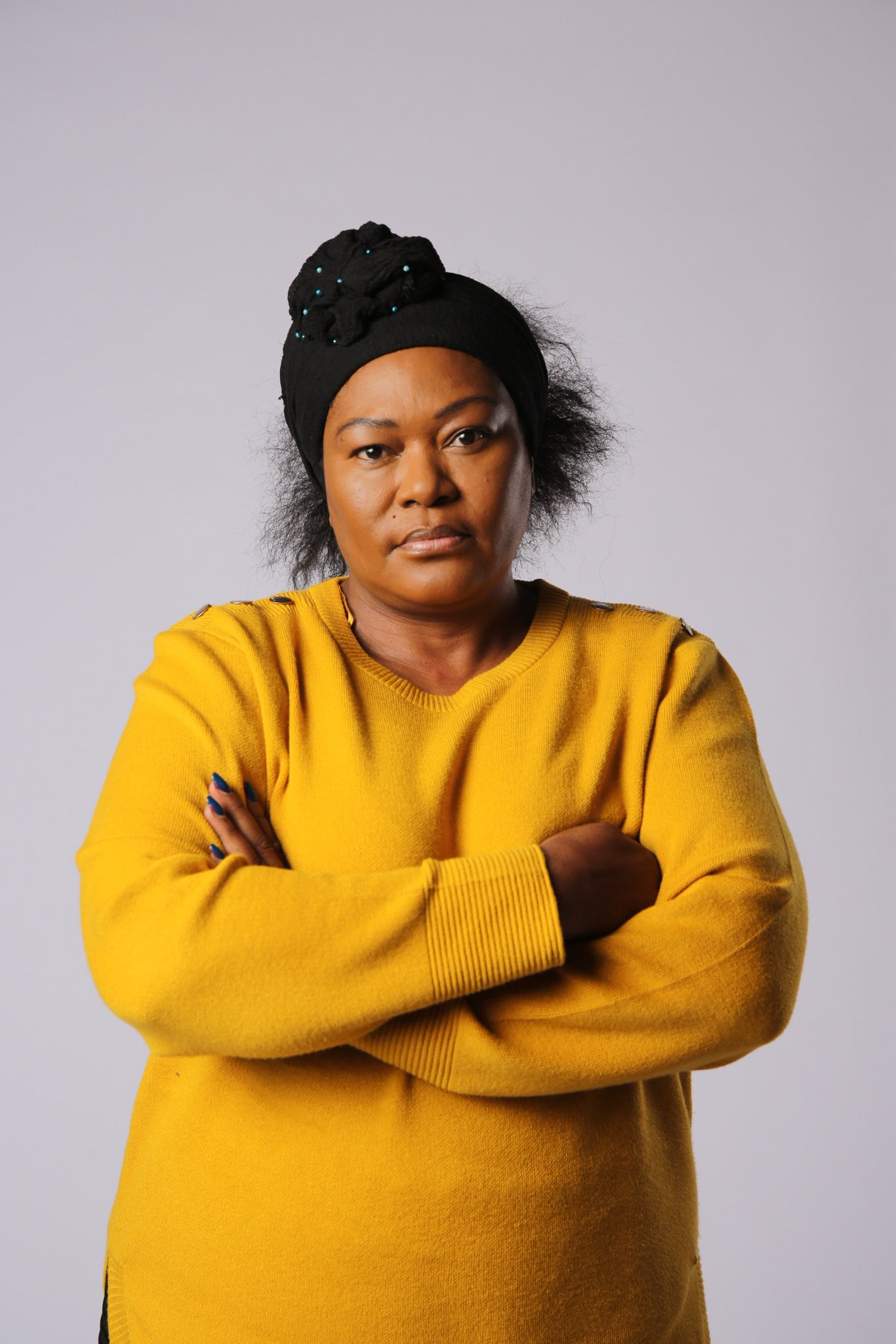
- South African Actress
- Born: Harriet Lenabe; 13 October 1971 (age 54); Diepkloof, Soweto, South Africa
- Education: St. Anthony's Centre, Boksburg
- Occupation: Actress
- Years active: 1998–present
- Known for: Skeem Saam

Harriet Manamela (born 13 October 1971), sometimes credited as Harriet Lenabe, is a South African actress best known for portraying Meikie Maputla in the SABC 1 soap opera Skeem Saam.

== Early life and education ==
Manamela was born in Diepkloof, Soweto. She later relocated to Johannesburg with her family during the early 1990s. She completed her schooling at St. Anthony's Centre in Boksburg.

== Career ==
Manamela began her acting career in community theatre after joining the Squints Artists Community Theatre Group in Alexandra. During this period, she appeared in stage productions including The Virus and Let's Talk About AIDS at The Market Theatre Laboratory. She also toured Sweden with productions such as Gomorrah!, Ways of Dying, and Koze Kuse Bash.

She made her television debut in 1998 with appearances in productions such as Soul City, Isidingo, Isibaya Yizo Yizo II, and Justice for All. She later became known for playing Nomzamo, the mother of Suffocate, in the e.tv soap opera Rhythm City.

In 2011, she joined the cast of the SABC 1 soap opera Skeem Saam as Meikie Maputla, a role that brought her national recognition.

In 2026, she joined the fourth season of e.tv's telenovela Isitha: The Enemy, portraying Dorcas.

== Filmography ==
=== Film ===
Year	Title	Role	Notes
2000	Hijack Stories	Baragwanath Nurse	Feature film
2001	Dr Lucille: The Lucille Teasdale Story		Television film
2004	Country of My Skull	Albertina Sobandla	Feature film
2004	Yesterday	Teacher	Feature film
2008	Gugu and Andile	Busu Dlamini	Feature film
2010	Life, Above All	Mrs Tafa	Feature film
2011	Otelo Burning	Mother Christmas	Feature film
2015	Avengers: Age of Ultron	Johannesburg Onlooker	Feature film
2016	Vaya	Grace	Feature film

=== Television ===
Year(s)	Title	Role	Notes
1998	Soul City		Television series
1998	Isidingo		Soap opera
2001	Yizo Yizo II	Nurse	Drama series
2001	Justice for All		Television series
2002	Soul Buddyz	Defence Attorney	Television series
2004	Zero Tolerance	Lebo Mahlangu	Television series
2006	When We Were Black	Aunty	Drama series
2007	Rhythm City	Nomzamo	Soap opera
2011–present	Skeem Saam	Meikie Maputla	Main role
2014	Thola	Dieketseng Mofokeng	Drama series
2026–present	Isitha: The Enemy	Dorcas	Telenovela

== Awards and nominations ==
=== South African Film and Television Awards ===
Year	Work	Award	Result	Ref.
2012	Life, Above All	Best Supporting Actress – Feature Film	Won	

=== Royalty Soapie Awards ===
Year	Work	Award	Result	Ref.
2024	Herself as Meikie Maputla	Outstanding Supporting Actress	Won	
