= Eric Macheru =

South African actor

- Born: 25 February 1983 (age 42); Polokwane, South Africa
- Education: Kuschke Agricultural High School
- Alma mater: AFDA, The School for the Creative Economy
- Occupations: Actor; footballer
- Years active: 2011–present
- Television: Skeem Saam (since 2011)

Eric Macheru (born 25 February 1983) is a South African actor and former footballer prominently known for portraying Leeto Maputla on the soap opera, Skeem Saam on SABC1.
