= Bokoni =

Pre-colonial, agro-pastoral society in South Africa

- Location within South Africa
- 25°24′43″S 30°20′23″E
- Type: Community and political entity
- Periods: Late Iron Age
- Location: Mpumalanga Province, South Africa

History
- Built: 16th or 17th century
- Built by: Koni people
- Abandoned: 19th century

Site notes
- Length: 150 km (93 mi)

Bokoni (meaning 'land of the people from the north') was a pre-colonial, agro-pastoral society found in northwestern and southern parts of present-day Mpumalanga province, South Africa. Iconic to this area are stone-walled sites, found in a variety of shapes and forms. Bokoni sites also exhibit specialized farming and long-distance trading with other groups in surrounding regions. Bokoni saw occupation in varying forms between approximately 1500 and 1820.

== Etymology ==
Bokone translates to "northern region", and with the class 2 prefix {Ba-} it takes the meaning "people from the north'. In spite of inaccuracies surrounding the term 'Koni' (having been used to describe an incorrect background as Nguni in a modern ethnolinguistic sense), it is still used in reference to the communities associated with Bokoni.

For comparison, in the same way that Bokoni relates to the Koni, "Bopedi" refers to the area or society of the Pedi people.

== Description ==
=== Settlement ===
It is thought in recent studies that the Koni are not a single ethnic entity, and should not be counted as such. Archaeological studies conducted on early Koni sites may actually study a selection of groups, bearing different origins and ethnicities, that arrived in the same region around the same time. At some point between then and the more recent stages of Bokoni's history, these groups merged and formed a collective identity. It has been theorized that Roka groups made up part of this merged identity. A number of scholars note that some of the groups making up the Koni came from the east of the area, while others came from the northwest. Other academic sources note that modern Koni groups reference Swaziland (modern-day Eswatini) to be the location of their ancestral origin.

=== Sites ===
Bokoni sites are found almost continuously between Orighstad and Carolina, usually along the various rivers branching out to the east and west along this 150 kilometer stretch. Bokoni communities generally consisted of centralized, large villages, found on valley hills; with smaller settlements bearing similarities surrounding them. The largest of the villages associated with Bokoni have been measured at over 5 kilometers across. There are a few notable outliers to these patterns: including clusters of sites in the nearby southern Komati Valley, and within the Crocodile Tributaries. A single cluster of sites can also be found to the west of the general Bokoni region, in the Steelpoort Valley; but these sites do not bear the same characteristics as other Bokoni sites, and have been somewhat ignored in various analyses. The Bokoni region has also been described more generally as being between the Leolu Mountains, the Spekboom River, and the Badfontein Valley.

Settlements across the Bokoni region are also seen to span a considerable range of altitudes. Population estimate studies have placed the Bokoni population at the society's height to be somewhere in the range of 19,000 and 57,000 individuals.

=== Occupational phases ===
Four main occupational phases have been identified in Bokoni history.

1. Pre-18th century: Centered within the Komati River Valley, small chiefdoms engaged in light construction of the first stone terraces.
2. Early-18th century – mid-18th century: At this point in time, structures start to take a more defensive form. This aligns with a shift of population center from Moxomatsi to Mohlo-Pela. It has been theorized that these correlate with violence from the nearby Mapono. This phase also sees the creation of many villages that remain into later periods.
3. Mid-18th century – mid-19th century: This period is marked by frequent conflict: most commonly with the Pedi, or Maroteng. Resulting from the scattering of the Koni people during this period in time, most data comes from oral histories as opposed to archaeological data.
4. Late-19th century: After a very brief revival at the start of this phase, Bokoni saw decline and eventual loss of autonomy in the face of larger local groups at this point in time. Sites are generally abandoned between this point and the present.

== Stone-walled features ==
Iconic to Bokoni sites and considered unique to this region of Africa is the presence of significant stone terracing and stonecrafting. Locally sourced stones both surround and compose a number of features: including homesteads, roads, and a variety of enclosures for animals; as well as other, less common features that have been seen to vary on a site-by-site and region-by-region basis. Stone terracing and walls vary greatly in form, and have been seen to range from 1.2 to well over 2 meters in height. Terracing at Bokoni sites is singularly well-preserved in comparison to other South African groups from the same time period. While similar designs in homesteads can be found in other regions, the roads and agricultural terraces found at Bokoni sites are considered completely unique.

Stone-walled features at Bokoni sites were by no means static: it is thought by academics that these features would change over time to fit the needs of site occupants. The archaeological record for some sites depicts multi-layered roads, and excavations at Rietvlei have revealed cattle grazing areas placed directly on top of former agricultural terraces. It is argued that the goal was maximum efficiency in land usage.

=== Roads ===
Roads found at Bokoni sites are recognized to be the longest and most complex in pre-Colonial South Africa, and have few comparable systems elsewhere in the world. Roads for this region are commonly defined by a stone wall on either side. These roads connect homesteads, and would have limited the movement of cattle throughout the area, while keeping terraced agricultural zones safe from grazing. Approaching the homesteads themselves, the roads tend to narrow to around a meter in width, limiting traveling livestock to a single-file line. In most cases, the homestead-leading paths terminate at the entrance to the central enclosure of a given homestead after appearing at entrances to larger, communal paths. These communal pathways link homesteads and terraces together over a larger area, and have been found to measure as long as or in excess of 4 kilometers each.

=== Agricultural terracing ===
Terracing in Bokoni's agricultural infrastructure takes varying forms of complexity, and is the only known field-based agricultural system to have persisted since prior to, and through, Africa's colonial period. The boundary of a field may be marked with one to a few rows of simply arranged stones, or sometimes lined with considerable stone walls, usually measuring well over a meter in height. Sizes and shapes of individually marked farming plots have been seen to vary wildly in both size and shape, but common among Bokoni agricultural endeavors is the tendency to place plots on slopes as opposed to within flatter plains. While it is possible, and assumed by academics, that agriculture occurred on the plains, there are no terraces, structures, or other archaeological evidence yet found to imply that this is the case. Stone materials for the construction of terraces and other hillside stone structures have been noted to be sourced from the same hills on which they have been purposed.

Terraces prove useful in the struggle against soil erosion on hillside sites. Terraces here succeed in not only organizing plots of farmland, but in making cultivation possible on the steeper slopes of the area, where soil erosion would otherwise prove problematic. In most studied cases, it seems that terrace walls were not built up all at once; after buildup of otherwise lost soils, certain sections of previously-stone rows were expanded upwards to further prevent soil loss. It is also thought that terracing was not implemented at the beginning of site occupations, but rather slowly over time to accommodate increasing populations.

=== Homesteads ===
Bokoni homesteads share a degree of uniformity in their layout: central livestock kraals, surrounded by domestic spaces, in turn surrounded by an encompassing outer wall. Most of the time, a homestead will be connected with a small, individual road to a larger, communal road leading to other homesteads and other parts of the settlement. Houses have been seen to be built in the domestic spaces of these homesteads. Superstructures are assumed to have been softer materials than stone: leading to a lack of visible remains besides the stone lining where walls would have been for most sites, and fire pits for some sites. The exception to this trend are some sites featuring nearly-entire stone huts also displaying the use of corbels: usually found in outlier cluster sites to the south of the main Bokoni regions.

Homesteads are notable for the role they played in the context of Koni spirituality: as the spirit world of the Koni belief system could only be reached by male heads of household through the power channeled through ties to deceased patrilineal ancestors. Clustering patterns of enclosures within homesteads have also been tied to family structure in some studies: as the homestead is developed further to accommodate an expanding familial group, the physical structure would depict ties and family size.

In archaeological studies, researchers identified and separated out three distinct varieties of homesteads:

1. A pair of concentric circles. The inner would house livestock in its central kraal; and the outer would serve as a domestic space, with houses placed within it. A wall would surround the domestic space, completing the second circle and tying the homestead together. This type of homestead is generally found in small, isolated settlements.
2. A pair of concentric circles. This variety is similar to the first, but is distinguished by a number of auxiliary circles on the outside of the outer wall, The distribution of these auxiliary circles tends to vary between sites, but generally seems to geometric or 'flowering' patterns. This type of homestead is generally found in larger settlements, and less frequently (although not completely absent) in smaller ones.
3. Lacking the concentric circles of the former two varieties, the third form of homestead is entirely consisted of smaller circles. This is the rarest of the three varieties, and is usually found at a distance from other homesteads and agricultural terracing; as opposed to being more closely incorporated.

In comparison to other homestead-type sites across the continent, it is generally recognized that Bokoni homestead sites are unique in their failure to follow traditional pattern conventions. This is true of not only general design, but also of such features as oppositional-oriented enclosures of the first and second homestead varieties, and directionally-oriented outer enclosures of the second and third varieties. It is thought that some of that some homestead sites display design elements of artistic patterns, such as depictions of flowers. Clusters of homesteads have been seen to vary greatly in size, with the largest known group to be at Rietvlei, composed of around 300 homesteads.

=== Rock engravings ===
Generally considered to be an integral component of Bokoni homesteads, the Koni frequently created rock engravings. These were once thought to have been recognizable as detailed 'floor plans' of homesteads, but are now considered to be more interpretive in nature. These petroglyphs are known to be of high detail, and present artistically stylized depictions of structures in a manner that many other forms of South African Iron Age community engravings do. There is also an aspect of 'masculinity' argued by some to be present in the engravings of the Boomplaats area and beyond, potentially created by young male artists during cattle tending activities. Due to their classification as rock art, the Bokoni homestead engravings are protected under South Africa's National Heritage Resources Act of 1999.

== Society and culture ==
=== Authority figures ===
Across Mpumalanga, the role of chiefs between societies show frequent similarities. This extends even to terms of reference: four different terms for a chief across the region, kgoši, kgosi, inkosi, and ihosi, show remarkable likeness to one another, as well as additional evidence towards the fact that chiefdoms extend back significantly into the past for almost all cultures here. In terms of duties, group chiefs were generally responsible for society-wide dealings such as security and migration when necessitated. It is theorized that across the region over time, aligning with pressures from outside groups, chiefs developed a more defense-oriented way of thinking. This led to the development of higher-elevation stone-walled structures and, eventually, more fortified defensive structures. Location for these more strategically sound settlements has also been attributed to desire for better vantage points for hunting, or as culturally significant elevations to display dominance or leadership over other groups.

The tasks of group chiefs were aided by councillors, as well as 'headmen', drawn from the diverse subgroups of each chiefdom. Both councillors and headmen were representative of their respective sub-groups ontologies and politics, and was selected based on age, rank, and skill. Group chiefs also experienced a high freedom of autonomy, as the greater Koni society saw very little centralization of power.

=== Agriculture ===
Geology for this region hints at high-quality soils, retained in place by a system of stone terracing. Among cultivars found at Bokoni sites are sorghum, pearl millet, and maize. It is recognized via archaeology and by oral history that at some point in the 18th century, maize was introduced - which would end up displacing sorghum. Maize would prove easier to produce, but less valuable. Agriculture provided the primary source of food supplies for the Koni, proving exceptionally vital in a society where cattle were not a constant. Farming was usually seen as women's work, and was a job delegated to the women of a homestead.

Chiefs were also responsible for the allocation of land for farming for their represented groups and individuals. Land would be split between residential, tillage, and grazing zones. The information regarding decisions of this nature was passed through chiefs to their subordinate; and from these councillors and headmen to the groups that they represented. The ability of the chief to create and distribute land in such a manner represented a method of communal land ownership.

At some point in the 19th century, possibly coinciding with a brief visit by David Livingstone, missionaries introduced plows and oxen as farming technologies to various groups of the Bokoni. It is unknown whether these methods proved effective in conjunction with stone terracing in agriculture. Before this development in technologies, hoes saw extensive use in the region as the farming implement of choice. These were usually modified with bored stones as weights.

=== Livestock ===
As mixed-farming communities, the Koni were heavily invested in cattle herding. Possessing vast herds of cattle was also a popular method for authority and chief figures to display their wealth. It has been noted in some instances that local warfare was more commonly associated with the goal of thieving cattle than with killing other people. Notable also was a distinct system for loaning of cattle: allowing for better distribution of wealth, and in some cases, for clients to rise economically in their groups. Cattle herding was usually a man's job. Known for their efficiency, a small group of Koni males could keep watch over and successfully herd a large number of cattle at once. In spite of the fact that cattle could be used as bride price for a wife, women were explicitly banned from interacting with cattle in some nearby areas. Their presence was deemed unsafe to cattle, and new wives in nearby southern Nguni groups could not drink milk of the herds.

=== Hardships ===
The Bokoni were subject to all manner of hardship: including drought, vermin and locusts, crop diseases, and human diseases such as malaria and trypanosomiasis. Also worthy of note were human-induced hardships: warfare, raiding, and chiefly confiscation of cattle.

Hardships were addressed by the Koni in a number of creative ways. Cattle-sourced fertilizer, hinted at by a lack of manure in stone enclosures, was utilized to supplement crops; and other crops were introduced for cattle grazing based on seasonal systems of rotation. Cattle were grazed at night to avoid the majority of insects, and vegetation associated with the harmful tsetse flies and mosquitoes were destroyed by means of fire and clearing.

=== Gender roles ===
The Koni were noted to have distinct, but not concrete, roles associated with genders: women were generally associated with tilling, and men were associated with stock-keeping. These roles were not absolute. Societies for the most part were patriarchal, but women found ways to exercise power as royalty and occasionally, healers. The Koni were also known for age-set initiation, organizing the roles of childhood and adulthood into distinct groups based on age and rites of passage. Age-based assignments would include such activities as hunting.

Women were also known for working as miners. By working at the Thaba Tšhweu ('White Mountain') in present-day Marble Hall, women could acquire limestone. This could be working into a fine powder, usable for make-up, face paint, and coloring for residential walls.

Genders could be limited in the accessibility to certain parts of homesteads. In some places, women were not allowed to enter the byres, found at the hearts of homesteads. The realm of women was granaries - found beyond the walls of the homestead. Also found penned outside the walls here were small stock such as goats. In other parts of the region, homestead domestic compartment households were run by women.

Cooking produces a unique separation of roles: most cooking, even of beef, and production of beer, was a task delegated to women, usually done inside. On certain occasions, however, beef would be roasted by men.

=== Trade and metalworking ===
Resulting from a number of well-placed connections and many desirable exports, the Koni experienced great economic success throughout the occupation of the Bokoni sites.

Whether or not the Koni were capable of metalworking is still a topic debated by archaeologists. Up until metalworking could be proven archaeologically, academics tended to assume that Bokoni did not engage in the activity. Common thought for a period was that while the Koni lacked access to iron, the later and nearby Pedi did. It is also thought, presently, that nearby Phalaborwa could have been a source for imported iron. Initial studies evaluating capabilities of the area were generally argued, even after the first discoveries of iron in the Koni archaeological record. In spite of initial thoughts, iron scarcity did not extend from the Later Iron Age into the Colonial era. Whether the iron was local or imported, it was clear that Bokoni peoples had access to it. Much of the Bokoni area, regions associated with later stages of occupation, are now known for their archaeological evidence of metalworking. At sites near Lydenburg, Badfontein, and Carolina, tools, facilities, coal; as well as finished products such as axes, picks, knives, spears, and hoes, were found. The Koni are still not associated with the production of copper or tin, but these materials are still found at Bokoni sites. The Koni are, for this reason, thought by many to be middlemen in a trade network, moving various metals and other items outwards and onwards towards the Delagoa Bay. Delagoa would have been one of many trade centers beginning to appear by the 1700s in the greater geographical region surrounding Bokoni - the Mpumalanga was starting to gear towards large scale economies.

More recent research has unearthed the true possibilities and potentials of trading cattle, something absolutely associated with Bokoni. This may have been amplified by, and catalysing to, conflicts with Pedi herders in areas to the northeast of Lydenburg. Salt was also a common export for the Koni. This was produced from local alkaline springs, access to which could be bought by means of tithe to the residing local chief.

It is thought that beads were one of the first imports to reach the region, as hinted at by archaeological evidence from the nearby 17th-19th century Ndzundza capital of KwaMaza. Beads were high sought after in Bokoni society, and were considered to be highly valuable for peoples across the Mpumalanga. Distinct values were associated with different kinds of beads, and some were, in a literal sense, worth their weight in gold. On that note, gold was another export for the region. The Koni saw no use for gold, and it is not among the items worked into different forms in the archaeological record. It was assumed for a time that much in the manner that copper and tin were not local products, ivory was not a direct export for Bokoni. Presently, it is accepted that there were considerable populations of elephants in the area, leading to considerable coastal trade in the 1600s. Ivory from elephants would have been traded for such materials as cloth and beads. Their role in various trade networks may have led to pressures from outside groups attempting to absorb Bokoni.

=== Pottery ===
Most of the archaeological work regarding the region's ceramics was undertaken relatively early. Many early studies attempted to tie local forms to nearby modern groups, such as the Zulu and the Pedi. Early analysis of pottery has received some criticism from modern academics. These 'poor' methods continued on into the 1970s, argued by some to coincide with a general lack of reference to oral histories. In 1982, Collet proposed the name "Marateng" for the style of pottery associated with Bokoni. This is the name for a local mountain in the Badfontein region, and has been used by archaeologists in order to refer to not just the ceramics but the entire material culture package associated with the region. The name has received mild criticism, in sounding similar to the Maroteng.

Pottery for this region is thought to have been developed for purposes of cooking, storage, and water.

== Oral histories of the Koni ==
Initially collected by Berlin Missionaries in the 1860s and later by local officials and academics starting around the year 1900, oral histories of the Koni and Bokoni are considered somewhat questionable, and are known for the poor collection strategies and practices associated with them. Due to lack of proper documentation, even of sources for histories, there is a great chance of historical bias in the following histories. Collection by dedicated chroniclers and anthropologists began in the 1930s, with the works of C.W. Prinsloo. His works focussed on those who, at the time of collection, resided in the areas associated with the Bokoni; those who were found to recognize the Nguni as their ancestors. Prinsloo is usually considered to have collected the most thorough oral histories of Bokoni, having learned the local language of Sekoni, and having grown up among those who identified in the early 20th century as Bakoni. Winter and Hunt also collected oral histories, in 1912 and 1931 respectively, but these were mostly from the perspectives of the Pedi. Their notes on Bokoni are not as helpful as Prinsloo's.

Relative to how long they have been available for, oral histories have not been recognized until recently. Even ignored in the research of the 1970s, although perhaps associated with a very Pedi-focussed mindset at the time in regards to the region. This is noted by some scholars to be the result of vastly more information available regarding the Pedi as opposed to other groups.

=== Early history ===
Moxômatsi, located just south of Machadodorp, is recognized by descendant groups to be the first site of the Koni within the greater Bokoni region. This site was occupied until frequent attacks from another local group, the Mapono, drove the Koni away and to the northeast. The next Koni occupation is associated with the site known as Mohlo-Pela, this time to the east of Machadodorp. This site is noted to be a more successful occupation, and new villages began to appear all around the greater Machadodorp region. The most famous of these new sites, and the most frequently referred to in later times, was Khutwaneg - expanded in the local language as Khutwaneg, Metsi a Thatha ('shattered water, water vapor'). Dating this period in time can be achieved through the oral histories of the nearby Pedi (at the time referred to as the Maroteng). General agreement between oral histories places the Maroteng people moving into the area from the southeast, interacting with the Koni as early as 1650 A.D. This points to potential Koni occupations of the area as early as the beginning of the 17th century.

Over the next two centuries, the Maroteng and the Koni were geographic neighbors, seemingly both policed by the nearby Mongatane. This was a Baroka chiefdom to the north of both. Around 1740, the Pedi, led by chief Moukangwe, clashed with the Bokoni subgroup known as the Kgomane - likely residing just northeast of Lydenburg. This is listed as the first recorded conflict on a societal scale, and if paired with the occupational phase classification marks the beginning of Bokoni's third phase. Motivations for this conflict vary between oral histories, but there is general agreement in that the Maroteng were interested in expanding, and sought to do so after the Koni-associated death of Mohube. This was the son of the Pedi chief Moukangwe, and at the time had been acting as chief in the increasing frailty and age of his father. The Kgomane sought the assistance of the Mongatane in ceasing the violence of the Maroteng. It is thought that this catalyzed the Maroteng creation of the Pedi Kingdom, in order to oppose the alliance between the Mongatane and the Koni.

Succeeding Mohube was Mampuru, who increased pressure on the Koni as the new acting leader of the Maroteng. The centerpiece of this conflict was a battle at the Koni stronghold of Kutoane, found near Badfontein. Due to the apparent existence of only one entrance into the fort, led by Koni chief Ntsuanyane, the Pedi were unable to breach the stronghold. The tide of the siege turned, however, when a traitor revealed a second entrance to Mampuru. After the refusal of his son, Nthobeng, to make an attempt at this second entrance, Moroamotshe (son of Mohube and heir to the throne) agreed to breach the entrance. This brought about the downfall of Kutoane.

=== Incorporation and conflict with the Pedi ===
The actions taken by Moroamotshe (sometimes spelled Morwamotše) at Kutoane led to his rise to power over the Pedi Kingdom. During his rein, it seems that some Koni groups were incorporated into the Kingdom - although retaining their clan names and identities, common practice for South African incorporations and annexes. The Koni groups under the umbrella of the Pedi are thought to have had potent military and economic capabilities during this period. Following the death of Moroamotshe around the year 1780, however, two of his sons fought for succession of the throne. These were Thulare and Dikotope, who the latter of which would seek refuge with the Koni of Orighstad. This Bokoni group was known as the Maepa, and with Dikotope formed a military alliance with the Mongatane to combat Thulare.

Shortly following Dikotope's arrival at Orighstad, Thulare learned of the to-be alliance, and struck quickly against approaching Mongatane forces. Taking the group by surprise, he claimed an easy victory. Preparing to next fight the combined forces of Dikotope and Bokoni groups, Thulare retreated to Dikotope's home, and waited. Resulting from the late arrival of Bokoni forces, Thulare was able to achieve further victories against both groups. This resulted in the demise of both Dikotope and Mo'labini (the Maepa chief).

Thulare's reign would reach its peak following the combined defeat of both Bokoni and Mongatane forces. Following his death around 1820, however, significant political strige ensued. Many of Thulare's sons were each prepared to take his throne. This led to a fast-paced rapid shuffling of Pedi kings, as one would outsmart or kill another only to be done in himself. Amongst the chaos, and perhaps resulting from the assignment of region to manage from his father, Makopole left the Pedi capital to live among Bakoni of Lydenburg. His actions grew increasingly independent of the Kingdom, and was at one point referred to as a Bokoni chief as he developed the stronghold he inhabited. While acting as chief for the Koni, Makopole eventually drew the attention of Phethedi: a particularly short-lived ruler of the Pedi. Phethedi made an attempt at Makopole's fortress, and was unsuccessful.

=== Defeat of Makopole ===
Makopole's fortress was later taken by Sobhuza, on the latter's second attempted attack. Sobhuza is thought to have potentially been working under Mzilikaza, and was only one of a number of raiding groups besieging the Mpumalanga between the 1810s and 1820s. Many other conflicting factions played into the chaos of the region at this point in time. These included the Ndwandwe, settling the nearby Steelpoort in the mid-1820s, and the Ndebele to the west (around 1826). Up until the Ndwandwe conquest of the Pedi between 1824 and 1825, the Pedi were another continuous threat. A less immediate, but present player was Mozambique to the south. The Bokoni, right in the middle of this, suffered immense losses. The Bokoni in southern regions were hit harder than those in the north, having no mountains to retreat into. Some of these Koni turned to raiding and cannibalism in the face of the crisis, but all were scattered. Bokoni groups resorting to cannibalism were rebranded by the rest of society as 'Makchema'.

=== Regrouping efforts and Marangrang ===
After the departure of the Ndwandwe from the area around 1825, historical accounts reveal two chiefly individuals, Patane and Moss, emerging as new Bokoni chiefs. Resulting from quarreling between these two, a particularly strong commoner soldier named Marangrang (or Morangrang) rallied the Bokoni forces, deposed the two, and became the new Bokoni leader. This account is notable in listing Marangrang as a king instead of as a chief, implying a new form of identification for the Koni as a Kingdom. Marangrang was successful in defeating both cannibal Makchema groups; but also Bapeli groups to the north. It is mostly agreed that following these successes, Marangrang and followers departed the Lydenburg area for Khutwaneg, the Machadodorp-area fortress. While initially gaining seemingly-universal support from his Bokoni groups, it is noted that Marangrang was a cruel ruler.

The Marangrang Khutwaneg occupation reflected the needs of its peoples in this time: located in a defensible gorge, Khutwaneg would now feature more densely packed clustered stone courtyards and other stone structures. The defensive nature of this occupation was highlighted by the pressure of all manner of external groups, most notably the nearby Zulu.

Marangrang was deposed and killed by followers of Sekwati, who had returned to the north around 1828 and who would ultimately reignite the Pedi Kingdom. Some Koni groups displaced by this event would ultimately rejoin the Pedi Kingdom. By the 1830s, little remained of the Koni. The region was still populated, but lacked significant chiefdoms. Notable is another, third population of Khutwaneg by the Koni. This marks the beginning of the fourth phase of Bokoni's occupation.

=== Koni before colonialism ===
When threatened by the Boer, many remaining Koni groups were subsumed quickly or abandoned the area to seek refuge among other powers. In short bursts from the 1850s through 1870s, Koni groups were known to express resistance in the face of larger regional groups' weakened authority. In 1873, Merensky noted the Bokoni village of Botschabelo: led by Phassoane, and that this village was known to interact with; and offer shelter to, Johannes Dinkwanyane - later a key figure in the outbreak of war between the Pedi and the South African Republic. Dinkwanyane, moving out to accept the offer, set up Mafolofolo, north of Lydenburg. Mafolofolo is noted by archaeologists to be significant in both its construction and cultural significance. A modern Koni site, found among the stone walls here are openings for the use of firearms. The groups here are seen to be a mixture of Koni, Pedi, and even mission workers. This site, highly fortified as a fortress, was one of the last associated with the Koni (established in the second half of the 19th century).

== Archaeology of Bokoni sites ==
Areas of archaeological focus from the 1930s to the present.

=== History of archaeology ===
While there was mild interest by academics during and around 1918 regarding the region's petroglyphs, early studies of Bokoni sites between Orighstad and Carolina were undertaken starting in the 1930s. The first of these was P.W. Laidler's 1932 study: which focussed on the region's ceramics as opposed to stone features. E. C. N. van Hoepen's 1939 study was the first to actually examine the stone-walled features of four Bokoni sites, engaging enclosures, terraces, and engravings. Hoepen noted these sites to be the homesteads of polygamous Pedi and Ndzundza ancestors. Ironically, P.W. Prinsloo had already identified the Bokoni sites to be the work of the Koni people, a few years earlier.

Following the work of Laidler and Hoepen, studies in this region generally froze until the 1960s, during which Revil J. Mason (frequently cited as R.J. Mason) analyzed stone-terraced settlements in the region from ground- and aerial-perspectives. Aerial photography used in Mason's 1968 study of the region yielded the discovery of nearly 1,800 settlements in the general vicinity of Orighstad. Mason's definition of a 'settlement' differed from that of other experts, as was seen in later decades of research. Mason's interest in continuing research in the area resulted the creation of the Iron Age Program at the University of Witwatersrand, which in turn increased interest in the area until Mason's departure from the university a few decades later.

The 1970s saw much greater interest in these sites. Inspired by the works of Revil J. Mason, Timothy Michael Evers (frequently cited as T.M. Evers) conducted another aerial survey of the region, discovering what he later identified as 166 stone-walled sites (these 166 would have translated to around 5,000 sites, using the logic found in Mason's works). Evers also sought to analyze the patterns of construction and clustering in these sites. Beginning in the very late 1970s and continuing on through the 1980s, Dave Collet (at the time a masters student at the University of Witwatersrand) focussed on the Badfontein region to the south of areas studied by both Evers and Mason. This region was deemed significant for placement of westward-facing sloped settlements (as compared to eastern-sloping settlements seen by Evers' clustering research) in valleys.

Following R.J. Mason's departure from the University of Witwatersrand, interest in the area once again froze. The most notable study of the decades following was Tim P Maggs's 1990s analysis of the previously-unconsidered settlement engravings from Hoepen's 60-year old accounts.

Recent studies in the area include chemical analyses of stone terrace soil samples, as well as spatial analysis from GIS perspectives.

=== Debate over site residents ===
It was once thought that the Pedi were responsible for making these sites, but radiocarbon dating has revealed that Lydenburg Bokoni sites (dated to the late 17th or early 18th centuries) seem to predate Pedi sites and the Pedi hegemony. Clusters of sites at the Komati River Valley were seen to be exceptions at the time, but are now recognized to be earlier, first-phase occupational sites of the Koni.

A common belief among archaeologists, even today, is that the Koni came into the Mpumalanga from northern regions. Associated with an iconic leader of great significance, Mabula, the Koni have been argued to have moved into the area from Zimbabwe (where Mabula was buried at some prior point in time).

Another common theory is that the ancestors of the Koni occupied the lowveld of the Mpumalanga - occupying sites like Phalanorwa and Bokgaga near Leysdorp - at some unspecified point in time. When this group fragmented into many smaller groups in the 15th and 16th centuries, the largest of these groups (the Bokoni) fell under the leadership of the Matlala lineage. Some groups remained here in the lowveld, while others moved west and south: gathering in settlements in the regions of present-day Ohrighstad, Lydenburg, and Middelburg. The dominant group at this point in time was referred to as the Matlala-a-Thaba ('Matlala of the Mountain'). This group, during the 17th century, saw leadership conflicts between old chief and sons Rakodi, Mathekga, Mojela. At this point in time, some splinter groups occupied defensive sites such as Makgabeng & Blouberg. Other identified hybrid defense/farming sites by the Koni are Ga-Chuene ('Chuene's Poort'), and Thaba-Tšhweu ('Marble Hall'), although these have been referred to in oral histories as more temporary residences, occupied during a long-term movement of offshoot Koni groups.

M.H. Schoeman was the first to make a compelling case against the decades-dominant Pedi theory. Analyzing Pedi oral traditions, she found reference to the Badfontein area as a 'stronghold of the Koni', attacked by Mampuru-led Pedi. This concurred with older but less prominent reports from D.R. Hunt, who recognized the stronghold site (albeit not the other stone-walled sites) with the 18th-century Koni.

=== Pseudoscientific theories ===
Bokoni sites have also been subjected to a number of pseudoscientific theories. These include Hromník's theory that Indians and Indo-San communities built the sites, and then were displaced by modern populations. Instead of drawing from material culture, geographic proximity to India and a few loose architectural references are cited. These ideas have been mostly rejected in the present, and as a whole have become referred to by local researchers as 'the exotic theory'.

Heine and Tellinger make claims of Bokoni sites to be, resulting from alignment with Great Zimbabwe and the Pyramids of Egypt, portals to other worlds.

There are also a number of theories that sites are ancient observatories, frequently linked to theories of non-African construction. Early theories regarding site construction, especially those by van Hoepen in the late 1930s, attributed Bokoni to native populations of sub-saharan Africa.

== Present-day Bokoni ==
=== Current state of the sites ===
As of the present, no sites have been recognized as official heritage sites and are thus facing serious threats in terms of preservation. Many are on private land, and some of these have been destroyed to provide materials for new projects. In spite of legislation, petroglyphs are frequently damaged by visitors: touching, scratching and graffitiing; but also by the natural movements of cattle and fires as well as illegal looting operations.

=== Current state of the Koni ===
While the sites of the Koni are generally considered abandoned in the modern era, the Bokoni landscape has been continuously occupied through all phases and into the present. In 1952, a Koni tribe was noted by the Pedi as being independent (resulting from political assistance) and was headed by a leader known as Maserumule. H.O. Mönnig, in 1967, noted the presence of around 50 groups that identified as Koni within the area. These groups carried totems that included the scaly-feathered finch, hyena, elephant, duiker, buffalo, crocodile, leopard, lion, pangolin and baboon.

Some groups of Koni are noted to have found refuge and new lifeways at local missions, as highlighted at Botshabelo in the 2015 documentary Forgotten World.
