= Blaauboschkraal stone ruins =

Archaeological site in South Africa

Blaauboshkraal /Bakoni Stone Ruins
- Location within Mpumalanga Location within South Africa
- 25°35′41″S 30°17′20″E
- Type: Stone Wall used for agricultural Terracing and as a kraal
- Periods: Late Iron Age
- Cultures: Bokoni
- Associated with: Bokoni
- Location: South Africa
- Region: Mpumalanga
- Part of: Bokoni

History
- Built: c. 16th Century

Site notes
- Height: c. 1–2 m (3 ft 3 in – 6 ft 7 in)
- Length: c. 50 m (160 ft)
- Width: c. 50 m (160 ft)
- Condition: Surface artefact visibility moderate due natural erosional exposure.
- Public access: Yes

The Blaauboschkraal / Bokoni stone ruins are a provincial heritage site in the Mpumalanga province of South Africa. Its neighbouring town, Emgwenya, is 10 kilometres away. The site was declared a national monument on 18 April 1975 and is a heritage site recognised by the South African Heritage Resources Agency.

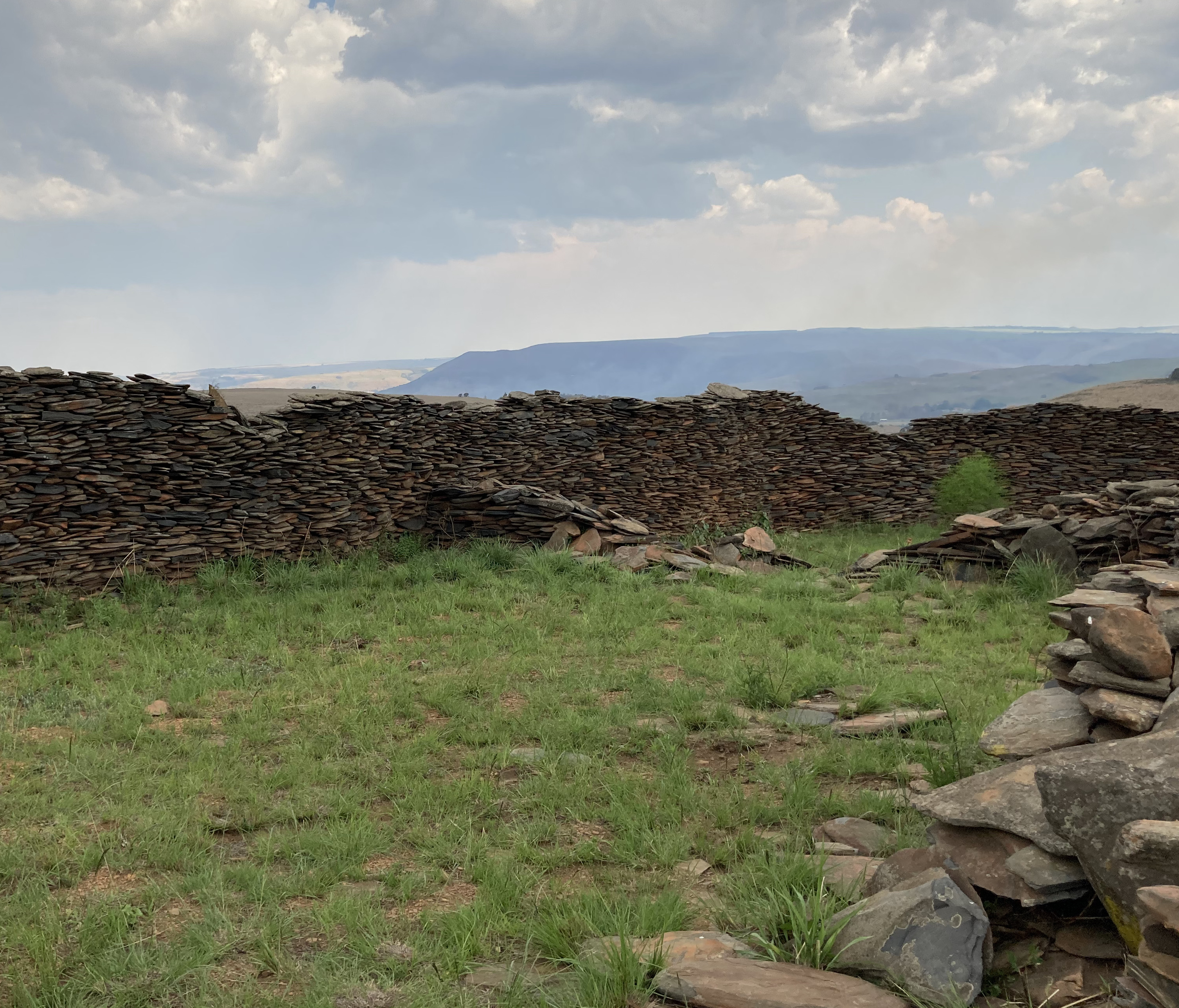
Bokoni Stone Ruins

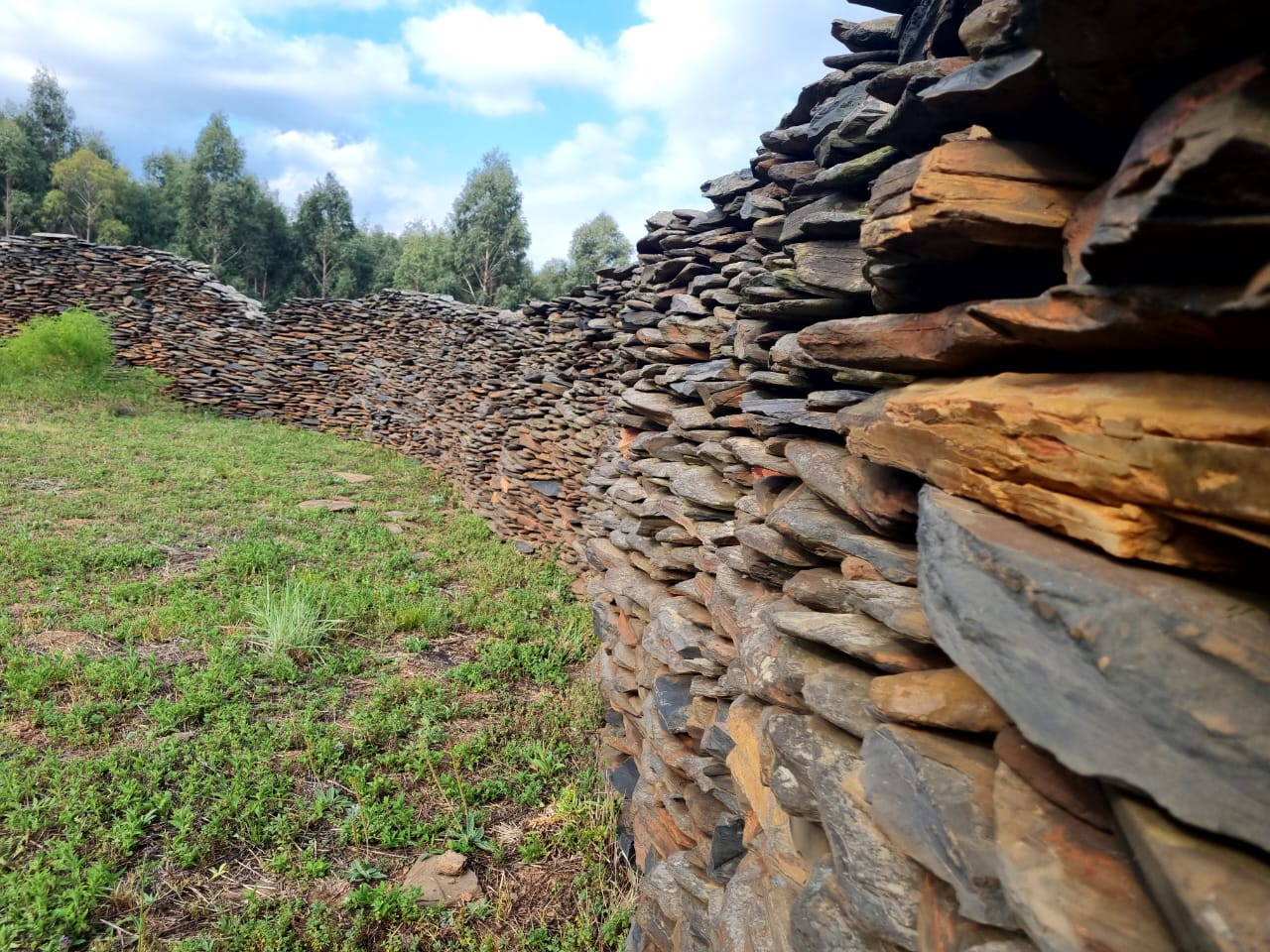
Bauwboschkraal Stone Ruins 30 April 2023

The Blaauboschkraal stone ruins make up what was part of a large, complex stone walling system built by the Bokoni people. While the exact age of the Blaauboschkraal stone sites is unknown the Bokoni people are estimated to have built stone walled settlements around the early 16th century. The site is assumed to have been used for cattle enclosures, agricultural terracing, and housing for the Bokoni people. This has been hypothesised due to the circular shaping of stone walling that characterises this site.

== Location ==
The Blaauboschkraal Stone Ruins are located in the Mpumalanga escarpment. In this region there is a clustering of stone walled settlements which span for 10,000 square kilometres, approximately 150 kilometres long north to south and around 50 km east to west. This area is estimated to have once been occupied by the Bokoni people who built these settlements. The Bokoni settlements are characterised by cattle paths linking roughly circular homesteads throughout spreads of agricultural terraces. The Bokoni people are estimated to have settled the region from a period between the 16th to the early 19th century. The Blaauboschkraal stone ruins make up part of the clusters in this region.

The Blaauboschkraal ruins are located on a steep sided valley where the Blouboskraalspruit river flows. The Blouboskraalspruit River is a tributary of the Crocodile River which flows to the Rio Incomati River. It is thought that this river system was one of the many used for Bokoni to trade with the rest of the world at the time. It is estimated they traded primarily agricultural products and formed part of the Zimbabwe-Portuguese trade route. It is thought then that the location of the Blaauboschkraal stone ruins was influenced by its location to water which facilitated trade.

== Historical context ==
The Blaauboschkraal stone ruins are widely understood to have been built and used by the Bokoni people and date somewhere within the last 500 years.

As characterised through the ‘phases’ of the Bokoni civilisation it is assumed the Blaauboschkraal stone ruins were built in the third phase. The third phase describes the time where there was increasing threat of domination from outside invaders on the Bokoni people. Because of invaders, propelled by the Mfecane, the Bokoni built ‘refugee’ settlements in kloofs (steep sided wooded valleys) instead of their traditional open-valley homesteads (Bokoni settlements primarily built-in stages one and two of Bokoni civilisation). Building settlements hidden away in valleys increased the Bokoni defense and created refuge for those living in them.

Considering the Blaauboschkraal stone ruins are located on a hillside of a valley, it is assumed this settlement was built in the 3rd stage of Bokoni civilisation.

The Blaauboschkraal Stone ruins are isolated away from other stone walled settlements found. It is more common for open-valley homesteads to have a complex connectedness between settlements which is seen in the region. This is thought to be a result not only of the 3rd phase of civilisation but also because of the weak political regime the Bokoni are thought to have had. The stone ruins found in the Mpumalanga region mirror a decentralised civilisation inferencing that they also had decentralised political and military systems. The Bokoni are thought to have been more influenced by trade than defense and military and this is what is assumed to explain the location of settlements discovered.

The trade route which was the Bokoni contributed to was that of the Late Iron Age. The landscape in which the Bokoni domesticated facilitated intensive agricultural production instead of copper and iron production which was popular in surrounding regions. This meant that they could generate food products in return for other necessities and luxuries such as metal and ivory. It is also estimated that their intensive food production may have provided the food security needed by those surrounding regions.

== Archaeology ==
=== Description ===
The stone walls in the Mpumalanga region and specifically the Blaauboschkraal ruins are built in a uniform structure and made from stone local to the region. The outer structure is built through larger stone and inside filled with smaller stones. Flat slabs of rock are placed on top of these structures to create stronger walls.

While the exact height of the Blaauboschkraal stone ruins is unknown, on average the stone walls in the Mpumalanga region are 1.2 meters tall and the least damaged parts reaching 2 metres tall.

=== Use ===
The inner circular structures of this site is thought to have been the homestead for the settlement and the more complex walling around the central homestead is assumed to have been used as a kraal (enclosures for cattle) by the Bokoni people. It is thought the Bokoni people used kraals to create pastures for livestock and prevent them from grazing on crops. The livestock they contained are thought to be cattle, sheep, goats and chickens.

The structure of this site features agricultural terracing. During the period of the Bokoni average rainfall in the region is estimated to have been around 660-1000mm per annum. This high rainfall makes it likely to assume terracing was effective in retaining and distributing moisture and maximising agricultural production. Terracing is also effective in protecting against erosion and to retain high-quality soils of the region. Therefore intensive agricultural production occurred on these sites, even ones located on steep valleys such as the Blaauboschkraal stone settlement.

By the 1830s the Bokoni homesteads and terraces were abandoned. This destruction of the Bokoni was propelled by the Mfecane. This is also the estimated time the Blaauboschkraal ruins were abandoned.

=== Research ===
Bokoni sites have been studied from the 1930s. Until recent, around 30 years ago, archaeologists studying sites specialised in understanding the key characteristics of these sites. Now, archaeologists have become interested in developing a deeper understanding of the cultural importance of these sites and the way the Bokoni influenced the evolution of Southern Africa and the Late Iron Age. However there is limited research that has been done on these sites and many questions remain.

The Blaauboschkraal ruins therefore still holds questions to its exact use, why it exists and exactly what it used to look like.

== Alternate theories ==
Pseudoarchaeological alternative explanations have been put forward for the Blaauboschkraal stone ruins, attributing alien and/or ancient origins. The most prominent proponent is Michael Tellinger, influenced by Zecharia Sitchin's ideas of ancient astronauts.

== Conservation ==
=== Heritage Management ===
The Blaauboschkraal ruins are listed as a provincial heritage site by the South African Heritage Resources Agency. Along with the provincial heritage resources authorities, the site is protected under the National Heritage Resources Act, Act 25 of 1999. This helps to maintain the quality of the site today.

=== Threats ===
The stone ruins of the Bokoni civilisation face threats to their conservation. Primarily weather has affected the quality of these stone ruins; this may include erosion from wind etc. These effects have been seen as the average size of Bokoni stone walls are 1.2 metres high, but some are 2 metres high indicating the effect of the weather.

The Blaauboschkraal stone ruins are a heritage listed site which aids in maintaining the quality of the ruins. Peter Delius, a historian and archaeologist, stresses however that the leadership in governance over the Mpumalanga province is not doing enough to maintain integrity of the sites. “As a matter of urgency, an audit of the sites needs to be done. It should be made clear that any person tampering with, removing objects, or vandalising the sites is committing a crime and will be prosecuted,” Delius said.

== See also ==
- Machadodorp baKoni Ruins
