= Non-monetary economy =

System for allocation of goods and services without payment of money

A moneyless economy or nonmonetary economy is a system for allocation of goods and services without payment of money. The simplest example is the family household. Other examples include barter economies, gift economies and primitive communism.

Even in a monetary economy, there are a significant number of nonmonetary transactions. Examples include household labor, care giving, civic activity, or friends working to help one another. These nonmonetized labors represent an important part of the economy, and may constitute half of the work done in the United States. These nonmonetary subeconomies are referred to as embedded nonmonetary economies.

The nonmonetary economy could make the labor market more inclusive by rewarding more forms of work.

== Embedded nonmonetary economies ==
An embedded nonmonetary economy refers to an economy that functions without money inside a larger monetary system. The nonmonetary economy undertakes tasks that benefit individuals that the monetary economy does not generally reward with payment.

=== Barter economies ===
Barter economies also constitute an important form of non-monetized interaction, although for the most part this kind of interaction is largely as a temporary fix as an economic system is in transition. It is also usually considered a side effect of a tight monetary policy such as in a liquidity crisis, like that of 1990s Russia where barter transactions accounted for 50 percent of sales for midsize enterprises and 75 percent for large ones. Economists used to view barter systems as the precursor to money-based systems, however there is no evidence for this view, or even for stable barter systems existing for long periods of time.

=== Time banks ===
A time bank is a community-based organization which brings people and local organizations together to help each other, utilizing previously untapped resources and skills, valuing work which is normally unrewarded, and valuing people who find themselves marginalized from the conventional economy. These are things that family or friends might normally do for each other, but in the absence of supportive reciprocal networks, the time bank recreates those connections. These interactions are based upon the exchange of hours spent on an activity, where time dollars are the unit of measure/ currency. They are traded for hours of labor, and are redeemable for services from other members.

=== Local exchange trading system ===
A local exchange trading system (also local employment and trading system or local energy transfer system; abbreviated LETS) is a locally initiated, democratically organized, not-for-profit community enterprise that provides a community information service and records transactions of members exchanging goods and services by using locally created currency. LETS allow people to negotiate the value of their own hours or services, and to keep wealth in the locality where it is created. LETS networks facilitate exchange between members by providing a directory of offers and needs and by allowing a line of interest-free credit to each.

=== Core (or social) economy ===
The social economy refers to the space between public and private sectors occupied by civil society, including community organizations, volunteering, social enterprises, and cooperatives. The social economy represents "a wide family of initiatives and organisational forms — i.e. a hybridisation of market, non-market (redistribution) and non- monetary (reciprocity) economies". Rather than being fringe activities at the margins of the formal economy, this amounts to a significant level of activity: The "civil society" sector of the United Kingdom employs the equivalent of 1.4 million full-time employees (5% of the economically active population) and benefits from the unpaid efforts of the equivalent of 1.7 million full-time volunteers (5.6% of the economically active population), and contributes 6.8% of GDP.

Edgar S. Cahn developed the concept of the core economy to describe the informal social networks that he considered the bedrock of society, which he felt were eroding as monetary economies de-legitimized them. The core economy as he defined it consists of social capital, and generates collective efficacy that's of critical importance to the core economy.

Collective efficacy refers to the effectiveness of informal mechanisms by which residents themselves achieve public order. More specifically, this is the shared vision or fusion of shared willingness of residents to intervene and create social trust (the sense of engagement and ownership of public spaces), intervening in the lives of other residents to counter crime, increase voting, or encourage residents to recycle. These informal mechanisms are what Cahn calls social capital, a public good provided by citizens who participate to build up their communities (from raising children and taking care of the elderly to volunteer work). Cahn believes this kind of work is essential to a democratic and stable society.

Unlike a market economy, the core economy relies on specialization reinforced by a "do-it-yourself" attitude that "Builds self-esteem and a voluntary interdependence that replaces involuntary dependence that comes w/ industrial and market specialization" and where self-sufficiency is based upon interdependent family or community units (instead of a market economy's atomized individual). This model reduces or eliminates the involuntary dependence that comes with the market economy's strict division of labor. It also focuses on alternative distribution mechanisms to pricing, using instead normative considerations like need, fairness, altruism, moral obligation, or contribution.

Collective efficacy and social capital are central to two very successful examples of civic-based, non-monetary economies: time banks and local exchange trading systems (LETS). These work systems provide alternative forms of currency, earned through time spent in directly serving the community, e.g. working in the community garden, recycling, repairing leaky faucets, babysitting. These units of time can be used to ask other members of work systems to do jobs they need, or may act as a forum in which special jobs or needs can be communicated and traded. These systems operate to a large degree outside of the monetary economy, though do not supersede the monetary economy or seek a return to systems of barter.

=== Community building ===
In 1998, Redefining Progress estimated that housework amounted to $1.911 trillion, roughly one-fourth of the U.S. GDP that year. As of 2010, the Bureau of Economic Analysis found that household work, if tracked, would increase the GDP by 26%. More than a decade later, household work continues to provide a key source of foundational support to the domestic economy. Such household work includes cleaning, cooking, care giving, and educating children.

There may be a closed household economy, where a specific (perhaps familial) group of individuals benefits from the work performed.

In extreme cases of survival, the open nature of the household economy is most evident. Food, clothing, toiletries, and basic necessities were often shared or exchanged amongst war-torn, impoverished families in East Europe post-communism. Cooking, cleaning, clothes-making, and forms of work may seem to be intuitively thought of as work. An Australian study (1992) determined that an estimated 380 million person-hours per week were spent on these types of unpaid activities, compared to 272 million hours per week at paid work.

A large portion of these hours can be attributed to nurturing. Nurturing can take two forms, in terms of raising children and nursing the sick, elderly, and infirm, both still usually expected from women and girls. Children represent not only a product of a household but an asset to the community as a whole. In the home, kids may provide help in the form of chores and so are an asset. In a greater sense, children are a public good: an investment in which time, energy, and money are spent so that they can become stable adults who share in reducing national debt and contributing to Social Security, thus a public good. As children mature and learn, they have the potential to benefit society in whatever profession or products they eventually produce.

The products and services produced within a home are open to the non-market economy at large. Society as a whole benefits from this unpaid work, whether in an immediate manner or a more abstract, macro scale.

The other form of home-based nurturing also serves benefits society as a whole. Care giving provides assistance for those who are elderly, disabled, suffering terminal illness or chronic illness, or are generally frail or in need of assistance. Someone who cares for someone in any of these positions is a caregiver. This is largely provided unpaid by friends or family of the patient.

Care giving often exceeds the nursing tasks that come with caring for someone who is ill or recovering from surgery. Often, caregivers also must maintain the dwelling, provide meals, and interact with medical providers and doctors, among other responsibilities. Nearly 80% of labor that keeps seniors out of nursing homes is unpaid labor by families.

In 1997, the value of work produced by caregivers was estimated at $196 billion. The figure was $375 billion for 2007. At the time, only $32 billion was spent on formal health care and $83 billion spent on nursing home care by the federal government. According to these statistics, only half as much money is spent on nursing and home health care as is necessary. These numbers do not take into account the financial burden as well as emotion work that is an inescapable part of this work.

The same research estimated that in 1997 caregivers would have received $8.18 as the hourly wage. As of May 2013, the hourly wage was estimated at $9.14 when averaging the minimum wage in Florida and the median wage for Home Health Aides. Caregiving requires a large dedication, as much as 22 to 70 hours a week. An estimated 25.8 million people as of 1997 performed these tasks.

Caregiving has a disproportionate effect on women and white households. The cost of caregiving is exorbitant, nearly five times what Medicaid would have spent on long-term care, meaning only wealthy families can afford to do this type of in-home care. The intersection of class and race in this phenomenon is an important place to explore as less advantaged families will have to rely on government care, potentially at the risk of having less quality care. These statistics also highlight a differential effect on women, showing that women disproportionately do caregiving work.

Valuing all work changes perceptions of what constitutes valuable work. Acknowledging a non-monetary economy may change the ways in which the unemployed, poor, women, and other stigmatized persons' work is valued. It can allow citizens to see their community as a more cohesive, intertwined system that deserves their time and energy. Exploring this economy also exposes numerous areas of help that do not have enough support from the public and private sectors. Education and caregiving in particular highlight where assistance is needed and often not provided.

=== Moneyless interaction of individuals with the monetary economy ===
This concerns individuals who agree with a participant of the monetary economy to exchange goods or services (reciprocation) or to receive them without any obligation (genuine gift). For instance, begging for anything but money, perhaps in exchange of religious services, as is the case for mendicants. Examples of individuals:

1. Raphael Fellmer
2. Heidemarie Schwermer
3. Carolien Hoogland
4. Mildred Lisette Norman

=== Free contributions to the intellectual common good ===
This is a case of mutualism (see macroeconomies below) embedded in the monetary economy and restricted to intellectual labor. Typical examples are posting questions and answers on an internet forum, the production of open-source software, and the development of articles on Wikipedia. In these cases, subsistence is usually guaranteed by the monetary economy. Categories of such contributions are Commons-based peer production, Open source, Creative Commons license, and so on.

== Non-monetary macroeconomies ==
The following is a list of moneyless systems which intend (or did) encompass an entire society.

=== Moneyless systems having a technological component ===
The following systems aim at moneyless societies, often aided by technology.

1. Technology-driven, often centralized ("resource based") societies: the Zeitgeist movement, its related projects named Venus, Auravana, or Kadagaya in Peru, and the Money Free Party.
2. The Technocracy movement, which proposes to replace money with energy certificates.
3. Large-scale algorithmic distribution (as envisaged by Stefan Heidenreich) for negotiating "matched transactions," each of which "has effects beyond all immediate participants." Yet, the procedure emulates money "when our profiles, our likes, and our consumer histories are used to calculate who will buy what and where." The transactions are recorded and, along with utility/urgency and reputation/personal history, the "matches" are determined.
4. Paradism, which heavily relies on automation.
5. The Unhampered Individual Rewards movement, which involves using numbers (or other symbols) not representing any fixed-amount physical property (cash, gold, etc.) to reward individual-person and individual-enterprise merit in terms of productivity, creativity, utility, or necessity of the work performed/product or service provided, not limited by monetary budget constraints or pricing instability. The numbers allotted to any individual account represent a cash-free income, and expenditure is accomplished with personally written check, purchase-card swipe or electronic transfer. The amount in each individual account is adjusted according to income or expenditure by simple math (addition or subtraction) which only represent changes in the economy of the individual involved, not in the collective economy. The collective economy is dependent only on the amount of natural and human resources available needed to produce a particular type of product or service, not the amount of cash in print and in circulation. The "cashless society" movement is considered to be a precursor stage for this movement.

=== Other moneyless systems ===
In the following, technology is less emphasised. The boundaries between the below systems are often blurred. The example of transplantation is international but could be classified as a micro-economy, too.

1. Mutualism in the sense of a (moneyless) economic theory. People contribute to a community without payment not only to help but also because they expect to be helped by a member of the community when in need (a selfish interpretation of solidarity.) So, the term 'mutualism' is understood as aid by the community and not necessarily reciprocation. (Compare to generalized exchange.) For example, if a transplantation center donates a kidney to another center, then its entitlement to receive a kidney from the community is increased by means of its export balance. Other examples are the anarchist communities during the Spanish Civil War, where quota and rations were used for distribution, and the Mink'a communal work.
2. Debt system, as used in manorialism or with the aid of the tally stick. To continue the previous example, if a transplantation country donates a liver to another country, then the recipient country is obliged to return one at the earliest occasion. To save transportation cost, such obligations are passed from one creditor country to the other in the obvious way. The transplantation clearing house could (if time would allow) further diminish transportation cost by deferring such alienation of the obligations. This would be similar to the fairs from which the banks and government-issued money evolved.
3. Collaborative Finance, which refers to a set of tools and techniques used to settle payments between two parties without the direct or indirect intervention of a third party.
4. The redistribution economy, which is a more authoritarian case of mutualism. For example, the Incas and possibly, also the empire of Majapahit.
5. A combination of mutualism and redistribution: Uruganda and similar economies like Umuganda/Isarongo and Ubuntu. These economies are based on culture rather than a fool-proof system. For Ubuntu, see also Contributionism as described by Michael Tellinger.
6. Labor vouchers, which are inalienable certificates of hours worked.
7. Non-monetary (state) communist currents, ranging from libertarian proposals to the harsh reality of Democratic Kampuchea. Many communists and socialists envisaged a moneyless society.
8. Gift economies: other than the word suggests, the gift in such economies usually comes with an obligation to do something in return.
9. Altruistic society: as proposed by Mark Boyle, a moneyless economy is a model "on the basis of materials and services being shared unconditionally" that is, without explicit or formal exchange.
10. The subsistence economy, which caters only for essentials, often without money.
11. Calculation in kind, which (in a restricted form) dispenses with any general unit of calculation when exchanging goods or services.
12. Natural economy, where resources are allocated through direct bartering, entitlement by law, or sharing out according to traditional custom.
13. Non-market ecosocialism as advocated by Anitra Nelson: as for the nonmonetary aspect, each household "guesstimates" its basic needs, which are met in return for "collective production as a community obligation." The production, distribution, and procurement of goods and services from "more distant communities" are collectively agreed on.

== Policy implications of embedded non-monetary economies ==
The UK in particular has been targeted by the government since the New Labor administration of the mid-1990s onwards—the social economy has been developed as a means of delivering effective public services, and mobilizing active citizenship. In 2002, for example, the Department for Trade and Industry (DTI) 2002 launched the Strategy for Social Enterprise to develop "the government's vision … of dynamic and sustainable social enterprise strengthening an inclusive and growing economy." The intent of the Strategy was to create an enabling policy environment for social enterprise, to make social enterprises better businesses, and to establish the value of social enterprise, in order that the sector may help to deliver on a range of policy agendas: productivity and competitiveness; contributing to socially inclusive wealth creation; neighborhood regeneration; public service reform; and developing an inclusive society and active citizenship.

However, by and large current policy does not reflect the implications of a system that does not validate actions that transmit community values, provide support, generates consensus, etc. These actions in the past were subsidized by cheap or free labor derived from subordinate groups, like women and ethnic or racial minorities, who as a result of entering the workforce to receive monetary validation negate these positive public goods.

The biggest issue that time bank coordinators face, as a result, is funding. Time banks do not rely on volunteers, but require financial support — to pay the time broker's salary, for a publicly accessible drop-in office, for marketing costs — to successfully attract socially excluded people in deprived neighborhoods. While many UK time banks have been supported by grant funding from the National Lottery, over time it becomes harder to secure ongoing funding, or to increase the funding available for time banks overall, and established projects close while new ones are begun elsewhere.

=== United States time banks and the IRS ===
Organizations that administer time banks, barter networks, or currencies may register for tax-exempt status under section 501(c)(3) as non-profit organizations working to benefit the community. The IRS has recognized some time banks as tax exempt; it is harder to obtain exemptions for a barter network or local currency, as they are harder to prove as operating purely on a basis of service to the community.

Being a time bank alone does not enable an organization to obtain tax exemption under 501(c)(3). If, instead of a time bank, an organization operates a local currency or barter network, such an organization may be deemed to be operating for the private benefit of individuals, even if those individuals are members of a charitable class. An exchange platform that is designed for use of the broader community, and not specifically for a charitable class, may not be considered a tax-exempt activity for a 501(c)(3) organization.

== See also ==
- Community currency
- Controlled market
- Distributism
- Economic freedom
- Envy-free item allocation
- Fair cake-cutting
- Free market
- Informal sector
- Market socialism
- Market structure
- Mixed economy
- Mutual aid (organization theory)
- Mutualism (economic theory)
- Neoclassical economics
- Otto Neurath
- Planned economy
- Post-capitalism
- Promise theory
- Regulated market
- Social market economy
- Socialist market economy
