= Closed-household economy =

A closed-household economy is a society's economic system in which goods are not traded. Instead, those goods are produced and consumed by the same households. In other words, a closed-household economy is an economy where households are closed to trading. This kind of economy is present, for example, in hunter-gatherer societies.

The production and consumption of goods is not separated as in a society with high division of labor.

The closed-household economy contrasts with other non-monetary economies such as a barter economy, in which goods are bartered (traded against each other), and a monetary economy, in which goods are traded for money.

== See also ==
- Autarky, the characteristic of self-sufficiency, usually applied to societies, communities, states, and their economic systems
- Back-to-the-land movement, agrarian movement of former urbanites advocating greater self-sufficiency
- Homesteading, a lifestyle of self-sufficiency
- Original affluent society, debate about the relative material comfort and security of hunter-gatherers
- Primitive communism, perspective on the gift economies of hunter-gatherers
- Prosumer, an individual who both consumes and produces
- Self-sustainability, a condition in which a person, being, or system needs little or no help from, or interaction with others.
- Subsistence economy, an economy directed to sustaining life rather than a market
