= Michael Tellinger =

South African musician and politician

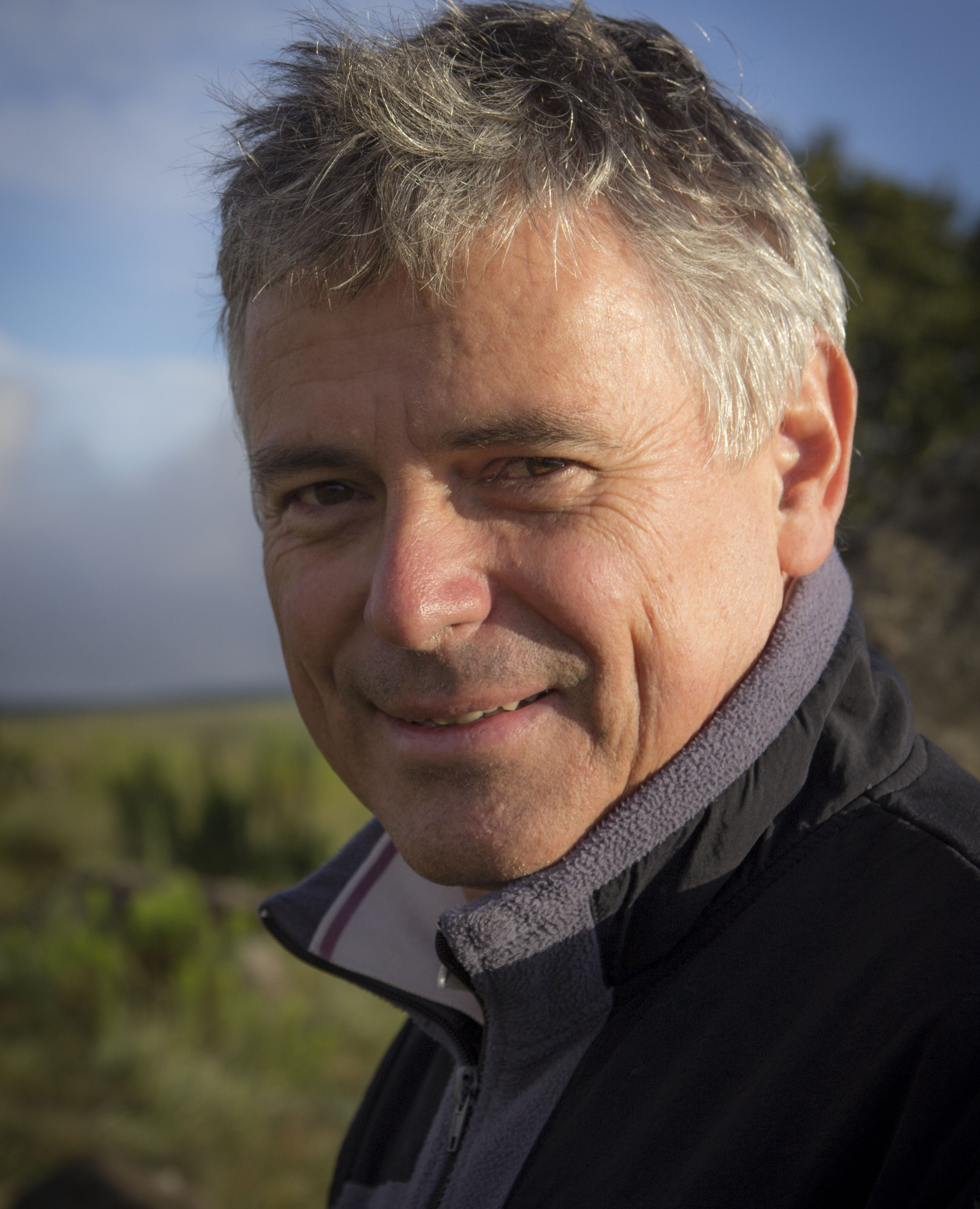
Michael Tellinger in 2014

Michael Tellinger (born 1960) is a South African author, lecturer, musician and political activist. He is known for his publications on ancient civilisations, his interpretations of the stone ruins of southern Africa, and his philosophy of Ubuntu Contributionism. He is the founder of the Ubuntu Movement, the Ubuntu Party and the One Small Town initiative.

== Early life and education ==
Tellinger was born in Czechoslovakia in 1960. His family emigrated to South Africa in 1969. He graduated from the University of the Witwatersrand in Johannesburg in 1983 with a Bachelor of Pharmacy degree. Following careers in pharmaceutical manufacturing, retail and distribution, he later worked in music, advertising, publishing and public speaking.

== Politics and community initiatives ==
Tellinger founded the Ubuntu Movement, which promotes his philosophy of Ubuntu Contributionism, advocating community participation, local economic development and shared ownership of resources. He later founded the Ubuntu Party, which contested elections in South Africa. After leaving party politics, he focused on the One Small Town initiative, a community-development programme intended to encourage local enterprise, cooperation and self-sufficiency.

== Stone Circle Lodge and Museum ==
In 2008, Tellinger established the Stone Circle Lodge and Museum near Waterval Boven, Mpumalanga. The museum displays artefacts, geological specimens and other objects collected during his exploration of the stone ruins of southern Africa. Tellinger has stated that these objects provide evidence for an advanced ancient civilisation, a view that is not accepted by the mainstream archaeological community.

== Music ==
Tellinger began his music career while studying pharmacy. He recorded his first single with EMI South Africa before forming the musical duo "Stirling & Tellinger" with Russell Stirling. The duo released several recordings and performed in South Africa during the early 1980s. In 1985, "Stirling & Tellinger" recorded an album in Nashville, Tennessee. Tellinger later worked in Los Angeles as a sound designer for Cannon Films before returning to South Africa, where he continued working in music and later entered the advertising industry as a copywriter. During the early 2000s, he also developed educational projects, including children's television content and literacy programmes.

== Campaign against banks ==
In 2012, Tellinger was sued in the Johannesburg High Court by Standard Bank for nonpayment of his R828 015 home loan granted in 2007. Tellinger's pseudolegal argument, in a nutshell, was that banks create money "out of the air" and therefore he could do the same. He sent Standard Bank a piece of paper which he said was a "negotiable instrument" for the final payment of the loan. Standard Bank took him to court and within minutes his case was dismissed by Judge Jackson Mabsele. Tellinger was ordered to pay the loan and legal fees of both parties. There was also the possibility that he could be sued for defamation and be declared a "troublesome litigant". He was quoted as saying after the court case that he would take the case to the Constitutional Court.

== Public speaking ==
Since 2007, Tellinger has presented lectures in numerous countries on subjects including ancient history, mythology, archaeology, economics and community development. He has appeared in documentaries and interviews on television and online media and has participated in conferences on alternative history and related topics.

== Works ==
Tellinger authored or co-authored the following books, three of them self-published through his Zulu Planet Publishers.:

- Heine, J.; Tellinger, M. (2008). Adam's Calendar: Discovering the Oldest Man-made Structure on Earth. Zulu Planet Publishers. ISBN 978-1-920153-07-6.
- Tellinger, M. (2012). Slave Species of the Gods: The Secret History of the Anunnaki and Their Mission on Earth. Inner Traditions/Bear. ISBN 978-1-59143-807-6.
- Tellinger, M.; Heine, J. (2009). Temples of the African Gods: Decoding the Ancient Ruins of Southern Africa. Zulu Planet Publishers. ISBN 978-1-920153-08-3.
- Tellinger, M. (2014). UBUNTU Contributionism: A Blueprint for Human Prosperity. Zulu Planet Publishers. ISBN 978-1-920153-12-0.
