= List of cities and towns in Limpopo =

This is a list of cities and towns in the Limpopo province of South Africa. Since 2003, a number of cities and towns have changed their names and may yet to be widely accepted and some of these place names remain the same as previously.

== A ==
Town Name	District	Municipality
Afguns	Waterberg	Lephalale
Alldays	Capricorn	Blouberg

== B ==
Town Name	District	Municipality	Remarks / New Name
Bandelierkop	Vhembe	Makhado	
Bela-Bela	Waterberg	Bela-Bela	Formerly Warmbaths
Baltimore, Limpopo	Capricorn	Blouberg	

== E ==
Town Name	District	Municipality
Ellisras	Waterberg	Lephalale

== G ==
Town Name	District	Municipality
Gravelotte	Mopani	Ba-Phalaborwa
Giyani	Mopani	Greater Giyani

== H ==
Town Name	District	Municipality
Haenertsburg	Mopani	Greater Tzaneen
Hoedspruit	Mopani	Maruleng

== K ==
Town Name	District	Municipality
Klaserie	Mopani	Maruleng

== L ==
Town Name	District	Municipality	Remarks / New Name
Lebowakgomo	Capricorn	Lepelle-Nkumpi	
Lephalale	Waterberg	Lephalale	Previously Ellisras
Letsitele	Mopani	Greater Tzaneen	
Leydsdorp	Mopani	Ba-Phalaborwa	
Louis Trichardt	Vhembe	Makhado	

== M ==
Town Name	District	Municipality	Remarks / New Name
Mankweng	Capricorn	Polokwane	Formerly Turfloop
Modimolle	Waterberg	Modimolle–Mookgophong	Formerly Nylstroom
Modjadjiskloof	Mopani	Greater Letaba	Formerly Duiwelskloof
Mogwadi	Capricorn	Molemole	Formerly Dendron
Mokopane	Waterberg	Mogalakwena	Formerly Potgietersrus
Mookgophong	Waterberg	Modimolle–Mookgophong	Formerly Naboomspruit
Moria	Capricorn	Polokwane	
Musina	Vhembe	Musina	Formerly Messina

== N ==
Town Name	District	Municipality
Nkowankowa	Mopani	Greater Tzaneen

== O ==
Town Name	District	Municipality
Ofcolaco	Mopani	Maruleng

== P ==
Town Name	District	Municipality	Remarks / New Name
Phalaborwa	Mopani	Ba-Phalaborwa Local Municipality	
Polokwane	Capricorn	Polokwane	Formerly Pietersburg

== R ==
Town Name	District	Municipality
Roedtan	Waterberg	Modimolle–Mookgophong

== S ==
Town Name	District	Municipality	Remarks / New Name
Saselemani	Vhembe	Collins Chabane	
Senwabarwana	Capricorn	Blouberg	Formerly Bochum
Sekgopo	Mopani	Greater Letaba	
Seshego	Capricorn	Polokwane	

== T ==
Town Name	District	Municipality
Thabazimbi	Waterberg	Thabazimbi
Thohoyandou	Vhembe	Thulamela
Tzaneen	Mopani	Greater Tzaneen

== V ==
Town Name	District	Municipality
Vaalwater	Waterberg	Modimolle–Mookgophong
Vivo	Capricorn	Blouberg

== Z ==
Town Name	District	Municipality
Zebediela	Capricorn	Lepelle-Nkumpi

== All ==
Mashashane

Jane furse
Afguns
Alldays
Bandelierkop
Ba-Phalaborwa
Bela-Bela
Bochum
Bosbokrand
Dendron
Duiwelskloof
Elim
Ellisras
Gravelotte
Haenertsburg
Hoedspruit
Klaserie
Lebowakgomo
Lephalale
Letsitele
Leydsdorp
Louis Trichardt
Modimolle
Modjadjiskloof
Mogwadi
Mokopane
Mookgophong
Moria
Messina
Musina
Naboomspruit
Nylstroom
Ofcolaco
Phalaborwa
Polokwane
Mokopane
Roedtan
Senwabarwana
Seshego
Sekgopo
Thabazimbi
Thohoyandou
Tzaneen
Vaalwater
Vivo
Zebedeila
