= R71 (South Africa) =

Road in South Africa

Provincial route R71

Route information
- Maintained by SANRAL and RAL
- Length: 201 km (125 mi)

Major junctions
- West end: R101 in Polokwane
- R81 in Polokwane N1 in Polokwane; R36 in Tzaneen R526 in Gravelotte; R40 at Phalaborwa
- East end: Phalaborwa Gate of the Kruger National Park

Location
- Country: South Africa
- Major cities: Polokwane, Tzaneen, Gravelotte, Phalaborwa

Highway system
- Numbered routes of South Africa
← R70	→ R72

The R71 is a provincial route in Limpopo, South Africa that connects Polokwane with the Kruger National Park via Tzaneen and Phalaborwa.

The R71 is used daily by people who work or reside in Dalmada, Mothiba, Nobody, Moria, Mankweng, Turfloop and Boyne. The road is well known to touring bikers who frequently visit the province from all parts of the country, because of the scenic route through Magoebaskloof.

== Route ==
Detailed Route

The R71 begins at a junction with the R101 route in Polokwane Central (capital of Limpopo), just east of the R101's intersection with the R37 route. As the R101 leaves the east–west road and becomes the road northwards, the R71 begins by taking over the two one-way-streets (Grobler Street eastwards from the R101 and Thabo Mbeki Street westwards to the R101).

Going eastwards, it meets the south-western terminus of the R81 route and just after, the two one-way streets become one road (Grobler Street) north of the suburb of Fauna Park. North of Polokwane Extension 28, the R71 meets the Polokwane Eastern Bypass (N1 national route) before continuing eastwards to exit the city.

From the N1 Interchange in Polokwane, the R71 heads eastwards for 51 kilometres, bypassing the University of Limpopo, through Moria, to the town of Haenertsburg, where it meets the western terminus of the R528 route west of the Ebenezer Dam. The R528 is an alternative route as they both go north-east towards Tzaneen.

At the R528 junction in Haenertsburg, the R71 becomes the Magoebaskloof Pass and continues north-east for 30 kilometres to reach a t-junction with the R36 route. The R71 joins the R36 and they are one road southwards for 4 kilometres into the town of Tzaneen, crossing the Groot Letaba River west of the Tzaneen Dam, up to the next off-ramp junction, where they meet the eastern terminus of the R528 route.

As the R71 leaves the R36 road and meets the R528 for the second time, it becomes the road eastwards (Wolkberg Drive). It passes through Tzaneen Central to cross the Groot Letaba River again. It goes eastwards for 24 kilometres to meet the R529 route from Giyani north of Letsitele. The R529 and the R71 become one road for 1.7 kilometres, crossing the Groot Letaba River one more time before the R529 becomes its own road southwards while the R71 remains heading eastwards.

From Letsitele, the R71 goes eastwards for 25 kilometres to meet the north-western terminus of the R526 route in Gravelotte. The R71 becomes the road north-east and proceeds eastwards for 51 kilometres, bypassing Murchison, following the Ga-Selati River and bypassing Namakgale, to meet the northern terminus of the R40 route and enter the town of Phalaborwa. After being the main road through Phalaborwa, the R71 reaches the Phalaborwa Gate of the Kruger National Park, marking its end.
