= R529 (South Africa) =

Regional route in South Africa

Regional route R529

Route information
- Length: 95.3 km (59.2 mi)

Major junctions
- North end: R81 in Giyani
- R71 near Letsitele
- South end: R36 near Lenyenye

Location
- Country: South Africa

Highway system
- Numbered routes of South Africa
← R528	→ R531

The R529 is a Regional Route in Limpopo, South Africa that connects Giyani with Lenyenye via Letsitele.

== Route ==
Its northern origin is a junction with the R81 in Giyani (south of the town centre). From Giyani, it runs roughly south-west for 77 kilometres to reach a junction with the R71. The R529 joins the R71 southwards for 2 kilometres, crossing the Groot Letaba River, before becoming its own road southwards. It heads southwards for 15 kilometres, through Letsitele, to end at a junction with the R36 just south-east of Lenyenye.
