= R36 (South Africa) =

Road in South Africa

Provincial route R36

Route information
- Maintained by SANRAL, RAL and MDPWRT
- Length: 450 km (280 mi)

Major junctions
- North end: N1 near Bandelierkop
- R81 near Modjadjiskloof; R71 in Tzaneen; R37 in Lydenburg; N4 at Patattanek; N4 in Machadodorp; R33 / R38 in Carolina
- South end: N17 near Ermelo

Location
- Country: South Africa
- Major cities: Modjadjiskloof, Tzaneen, Ohrigstad, Lydenburg, Machadodorp, Carolina, Breyten, Ermelo

Highway system
- Numbered routes of South Africa
← R35	→ R37

The R36 is a provincial route in South Africa that connects the N1 at Bandelierkop with Ermelo, via Tzaneen and Lydenburg. It is co-signed with the N4 for 8 kilometres between Machadodorp and Patattanek, with a tollgate on this section. It used to extend further south past Ermelo to Amersfoort, but that section is now designated as part of the N11.

== Route ==
Detailed Route

=== Limpopo ===
The R36 begins at a junction with the N1 national route in Bandelierkop (just north of the N1's Capricorn Toll Plaza), 70 kilometres north of Polokwane and 35 kilometres south of Louis Trichardt. It begins by going south-east for 46 kilometres, through Morebeng, to reach a junction with the R81 road. The R36 & R81 share one road eastwards for 1.5 kilometres before the R81 becomes its own road towards the north-east at Mooketsi. The R36 continues south-east for 30 kilometres, bypassing the Mooketsi Baobab, through Modjadjiskloof, to reach a junction with the R71 road and enter the city of Tzaneen.

The R71 joins the R36 and they share one road southwards into the city, crossing the Great Letaba River next to the Tzaneen Dam, up to the off-ramp junction with the R528 road, where the R71 becomes the road east-north-east while the R36 remains on the southerly road. Right after this interchange, the R36 bends eastwards, turning right by the Boundary Street junction, then right by the Danie Joubert Street junction, to continue south-east.

From Tzaneen, the R36 goes south-east for 85 kilometres, bypassing Nkowankowa, through Ofcolaco, to cross the Olifants River at The Oaks and reach a t-junction with the western terminus of the R527 road. The R36 becomes the road to the south-south-west from this junction and continues for 51 kilometres, partially as the Abel Erasmus Pass, to meet the north-eastern terminus of the R555 road, cross the Ohrigstad River and enter the town of Ohrigstad. From the Ohrigstad Town Centre, the R36 heads southwards for 18 kilometres to cross the Ohrigstad River one more time, before meeting the western terminus of the R533 road and leaving the Limpopo Province to enter the Mpumalanga Province.

=== Mpumalanga ===
From the R533 junction, the R36 goes south for 27 kilometres to enter the city of Lydenburg (Mashishing) and meet the R37 road. The R37 joins the R36 and they share one road into the town as De Clerq Street, then east as Voortrekker Street, up to the Viljoen Street junction, where the R36 becomes Viljoen Street southwards while the R37 remains facing east. The R36 goes southwards for 2 kilometres to meet the north-eastern terminius of the R540 road (which connects to Dullstroom and Belfast).

From the R540 junction in Lydenburg, the R36 goes south-south-west for 47 kilometres, crossing the Crocodile River next to the Kwena Dam, to meet the western terminus of the R539 road at a t-junction. The R36 becomes the road south-west from this junction and heads for 15 kilometres to reach an interchange with the N4 national route (Maputo Corridor).

The R36 joins the N4 national route and they share one road south-west for 8 kilometres, with a tollgate (Machado Toll Plaza) on this stretch, up to the town of Machadodorp (eNtokozweni). Just after crossing the Elands River in Machadodorp, the R36 leaves the N4 and becomes its own road eastwards as Molen Street, then southwards at the next junction, where it meets the north-western terminus of the R541. The R36 goes southwards for 49 kilometres, bypassing the Doornkop Fish and Wildlife Reserve, to enter the town of Carolina.

In Carolina Town Centre, the R36 meets the R33 road and the R38 route. The R38 stops co-signing with the R33 westwards and starts co-signing the R36 southwards. The R38 & R36 share one road for 4 kilometres before the R38 becomes its own road westwards while the R36 remains facing southwards. The R36 continues southwards for 26 kilometres to the town of Breyten.

From Breyten, the R36 heads southwards for 20 kilometres to reach its southern terminus, at a junction with the N17 national route about 8 kilometres north-east of the town centre of Ermelo.
