= R528 (South Africa) =

Regional route in South Africa

Regional route R528

Route information
- Length: 34.7 km (21.6 mi)

Major junctions
- West end: R71 at Haenertsburg
- East end: R71 / R36 at Tzaneen

Location
- Country: South Africa

Highway system
- Numbered routes of South Africa
← R527	→ R529

The R528 is a Regional Route in Limpopo, South Africa that connects Haenertsburg with Tzaneen.

== Route ==
It runs parallel to the R71 for its entire length. Its north-eastern terminus is an intersection with the R36 and the R71 in Tzaneen (west of the town centre) and it runs towards the south-west for 34 kilometres. It reaches its end in Haenertsburg, at another junction with the R71.
