= Chief Makgoba =

Bakgalaka chief

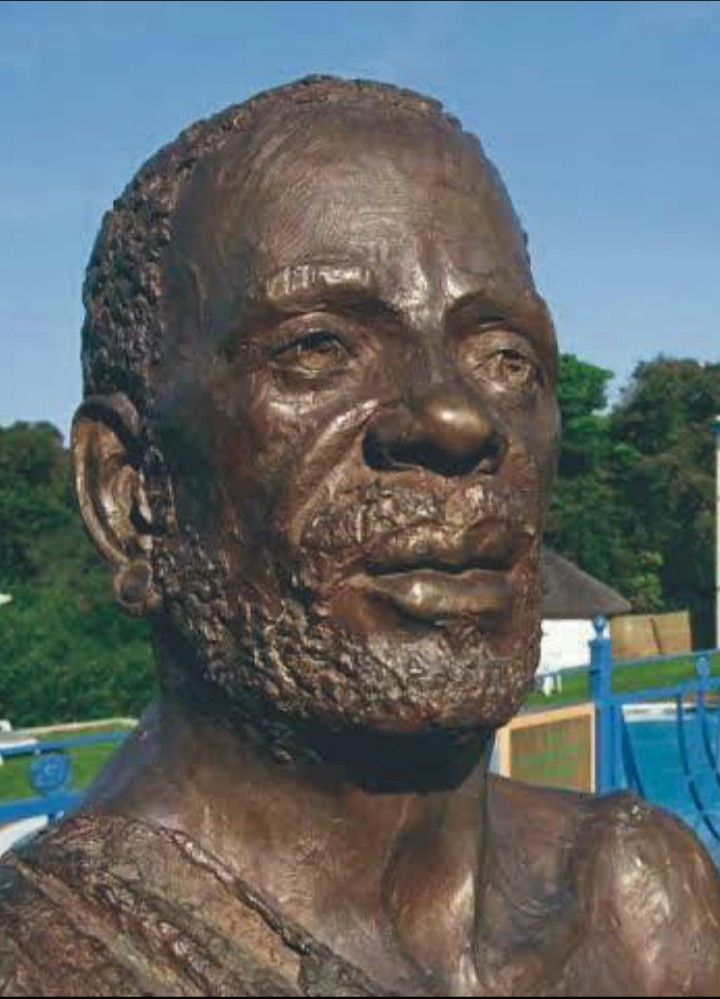
- Chief Makgoba statue
- Died: 1895, June 9
- Cause of death: Murdered and beheaded
- Occupation: Chief of Makgobaskloof
- Era: 1800-1895
- Relatives: Motjokotsa Makgoba, Mahlane Makgoba, Matsemana Makgoba, Mokopa Makgoba, Masilo Makgoba, Makhanyo Makgoba, Sekwaere Makgoba, Segogomela Makgoba

King (Kgoshikgolo) Mamphoku Makgoba was a Bakgalaka King who ruled Makgobaskloof (often misspelled Makgoebaskloof) in the Soutpansberg, former Northern Transvaal (Limpopo province), Mopani district, South Africa. His tribal totem is Tlou (Elephant). He was a King of Bakgalaka Ba Makgoba Kingdom. They are Northern Sotho. All Bakgalaka clans that came from Makgoba clan fell under Kingdom of Makgoba.

== Background ==
King Makgoba was the son of King Mogatishi and Mafunyane Makgoba. Mafunyane was the daughter of King Makhado of VhaVenda Nation.His grandfather Kalauba Makgoba was a prominent King of Makgoba Clan .Makgoba people are Bakgalaka (Kalanga) . They are Bakgalaka Ba Makgoba. The clan's totem is Elephant. In the traditions of the Makgoba clan, a first born child born to the eldest son inherits the name of the grandfather. Thus, there should be no confusion to read the historical figure mentioned in this article also goes by the royal title King Mamphoku Makgoba. It is interesting the different use of the titles "Chief" when discussing events about Chief Makgoba in the literature, and "King" when referring to him. Several authors admit that Chief Makgoba presided over a small population when the clan made contact with White Trekboers for the first time. As such, some say he could not have been King within a broader Northern Sotho population that once recognized the Pedi Royal Family as paramount King of all Northern Sotho tribes. Chief Makgoba was subordinate to other Lobedu bigger clans such as the Modjadji, Molepo, Mmamathola and the Mamabolos. The structure of the traditional system of governance and leadership as we know it in contemporary South Africa might have been differently articulated and understood by tribes in pre-colonial Africa.

Additionally, we know that the tribe of Makgobaskloof has strong links with some of the Kalanga-Sotho-Tswana tribes that established ancient Kingdoms such as Butua, Maphungubwe and Great Zimbabwe. The history of these great kingdoms is often shrouded in mystery since very little information exists in literature, but also in museum displays and archaeological narratives.

== Chieftainship ==
Chief Makgoba, as we know him, came from a royal family that led a tribe in Makgobaskloof prior to the arrival of White Trekboers in the Lowveld, Soutpansberg in the 1860. His governance and leadership of a small but assertive, and fearless tribe can be traced back to the early 1700s to the late 1800s.

== Extended family ==
Knowledge about the extent of Chief Makgoba's immediate and extended family members is tacitly organized and stored in the minds of the elders, and is part of the oral culture that is passed from generation to generation through tribal totems, child naming, surnames etcetera. What we know is that Chief Makgoba once mentioned in a public address that he has close relations with the Molepo's. Mathabatha's, Magoele's, Malahlela Royal Family and Ramohlola Royal Family's. Chief Makgoba had two Daughters Mmatema and Mmamalesela. The eldest daughter Mmatema became the leader of the clan as Queen (Kgoshigadi). She never married. She died in Ga-Molepo in 1970.

== The struggle against land annexation, colonization and apartheid ==
Chief Makgoba had several clashes with invading white Afrikaner farmers (Trekboers) who occupied land belonging to indigenous people in and around Makgobaskloof. As the ZAR administration began annexing land and imposing taxes on the indigenous populations, Chief Makgoba instructed his people to rebel against the annexation of land and the imposition of taxes.

== The Battle of Makgobaskloof ==
After the former ZAR (Zuid Afrikaanse Repuliek) administration introduced laws that redefined wards in the Soutpansberg, land belonging to the indigenous local population was given away to White trekkers to farm. This resulted in increasing numbers of White trekkers also in search of gold mining in the area. There is no clear indication when the first group of White trekkers came to the Lowveld of the former Northern Transvaal, but it is known that in the mid-1880s there already were signs of hunters and prospectors active in the area. As more gold was found, the towns of Haenertsburg and Leysdorp were established in 1887 and 1889 respectively.

As the ZAR administration intensified the giving away of free land to White trekkers, the chiefs in the area started complaining about the annexation of indigenous land. Many of the chiefs did not recognize the ZAR administration as legitimate because if fell outside the traditional institutions of governance and leadership framework(as amended). As a result, the chiefs and queens resisted because African people were not seen as equal partners to the land and the many natural resources deposits in the area. One of the complainants was Chief Makgoba.

In 1888, officials from the ZAR administration began erecting beacons to mark off land belonging to indigenous local populations. They also started imposing fines for those who resisted. Land under the traditional jurisdiction of Chief Makgoba was also annexed and given to White Trekboers. Chief Makgoba and his people destroyed the beacons in retaliation. After the Soutpansberg administration became aware of the action by Chief Makgoba and his people, they then sent Native Commissioner Oscar Dahl several times to Makgobaskloof to talk Chief Makgoba around to no avail. A warrant of arrest was issued, and Chief Makgoba was arrested and sent to prison at Fort Klipdam near Pietersburg.

== Resistance spreads to nearby Chiefs and Queens ==
While Chief Makgoba was in prison for the first time, other traditional leaders not far from Makgobaskloof joined the struggle against land annexation and exclusion by the ZAR administration. Queen Khesetoane Modjadji III of the Balobedu people was one of them. The "Rain Queen" also started a campaign of civil disobedience, and refused to allow tax collection in her area. When she was threatened with punishment she also threatened to kill all Christians in her area. As Queen Modjadji and her people continued with resistance, the administration Pietersburg and Pretoria decided to form commandos to suppress the revolt. However, the commandos were being continuously harassed by Chief Makgoba's regiments and Queen Modjadji was becoming more hostile. These were the first signs of deteriorating situation that would lead to a guerilla warfare by mid-1892. Another commissioner was sent to the area, this time to tell the chiefs in the Soutpansberg to stay clear of White owned farms and stay in their designated reserves. When this plan was rejected, local chiefs started attacking white farms in retaliation. As the attacks intensified, many white farmers started leaving the area to avoid conflict. On March 1, 1894, the ZAR administration send final warnings to Chief Makgoba and neighboring chiefs and queens, but they also refused to be subjugated. It was then decided by the ZAR administration that a war with Chief Makgoba and other chiefs/queens would crush the resistance.

== 1895 War between Chief Makgoba and the ZAR administration ==
On June 3, 1895, the ZAR administration launched a full-scale war against Chief Makgoba and other local chiefs after many years of resistance. Chief Makgoba had already earned the titled of "The Lion of the Soutpansberg" for his guerilla warfare strategies and tactics against an invading population of White Trekboers. Other chiefs such as Chief Malebogo had already surrendered. The war came to end after the ZAR administration connived with Swazi sellouts who managed to arrest one of Chief Makgoba's family members. At the time Chief Makgoba was at large in an undisclosed location while launching attacks on white farms and the commandos. The arrested family member gave in to torture by Swazi sellouts and revealed Chief Makgoba's location. He was later captured and beheaded by Swazi assassins' on behalf of the ZAR commandos. His followers say he committed suicide to avoid capture. However, it is alleged that the assassins took the head, and gave it to the ZAR government in the Transvaal as proof. Subsequently, the chief's head is alleged to have been concealed from the Makgoba family for many years. It is not clear where the chief was buried.

After the death of King Makgoba, some of his family members changed their surname from Makgoba to Magoele due to fears that his capturers will come after them. Magoele was a well known fountain in the area now called Ga-Mailula around Mamabolo. They adopted Magoele as their family name because the fountain Magoele was a source of water which was the community's source of life.

In 2011, Chief Makgoba's great-grandson Kgoshi Mokopa Makgoba led a campaign to locate the remains of the head of Chief Makgoba.
