= Politsi =

- Location within Limpopo Location within South Africa
- Coordinates: 23.764°S 30.104°E
- Country: South Africa
- Province: Limpopo
- District: Mopani
- Municipality: Greater Tzaneen
- Time zone: UTC+2 (SAST)
- Area code: 015

Politsi is a village in the municipality of Greater Tzaneen, Mopani District, Limpopo, South Africa.
