= Lenyenye =

- Location within Limpopo Location within South Africa
- Coordinates: 23.972°S 30.269°E
- Country: South Africa
- Province: Limpopo
- District: Mopani
- Municipality: Greater Tzaneen

Area
  - Total: 8.81 km^{2} (3.40 sq mi)

Population (2011)
  - Total: 12,099
  - Density: 1,370/km^{2} (3,560/sq mi)

Racial makeup (2011)
  - Black African: 99.2%
  - Coloured: 0.2%
  - Indian/Asian: 0.3%
  - White: 0.1%
  - Other: 0.1%

First languages (2011)
  - Northern Sotho: 95.6%
  - Tsonga: 2.7%
  - Tshivenda: 0,70%
  - Other: 1%
- Time zone: UTC+2 (SAST)
- Postal code (street): 0857
- PO box: 0857
- Area code: 015

Lenyenye is a township in the Greater Tzaneen Local Municipality of the Mopani District Municipality in the Limpopo province of South Africa. Lenyenye named after small river run on west of the township, the original name of Lenyenye township is Ramalema. It is located about 20 km southeast of the town of Tzaneen. The neighbouring township of Nkowankowa lies directly north of Lenyenye. It is the home of Bakgaga. The prominent dialectal language that is spoken there is Sekgaga sa ga Maake.

The township is best known as the place where the academic/politician Mamphela Ramphele was banished to under the apartheid regime and lived during the period from 1977 to 1984.
