= R527 (South Africa) =

Regional route in South Africa

Regional route R527

Route information
- Length: 32.1 km (19.9 mi)

Major junctions
- West end: R36 near The Oaks
- R531 near Hoedspruit
- East end: R40 in Hoedspruit

Location
- Country: South Africa

Highway system
- Numbered routes of South Africa
← R526	→ R528

The R527 is a Regional Route in Limpopo, South Africa that connects The Oaks with Hoedspruit.

== Route ==
The R527 begins at a junction with the R36 just south of The Oaks and north of the Abel Erasmus Pass, heading eastwards. It heads for 32 kilometres, crossing the Blyde River and meeting the northern terminus of the R531, to enter Hoedspruit, where it passes through the town centre to reach its end at a junction with the R40.
