= R526 (South Africa) =

Regional route in South Africa

Regional route R526

Route information
- Length: 64 km (40 mi)

Major junctions
- North end: R71 at Gravelotte
- R40 at Mica
- South0 end: R36 near The Oaks

Location
- Country: South Africa

Highway system
- Numbered routes of South Africa
← R525	→ R527

The R526 is a Regional Route in South Africa that connects Gravelotte with The Oaks via Mica.

== Route ==
Its northern terminus is an intersection with the R71 at Gravelotte. From there it heads south-east for 33 kilometres to reach a junction with the R40. The R526 joins the R40 and they are one road southwards for 5 kilometres, through Mica, before the R526 becomes its own road south-west. It heads for 25 kilometers to reach its end at a junction with the R36 just north of The Oaks.

The 25-kilometre section from Mica to The Oaks is also labelled as the R530.
