= Magoebaskloof =

Mountain pass in Limpopo, South Africa

Magoebaskloof Pass
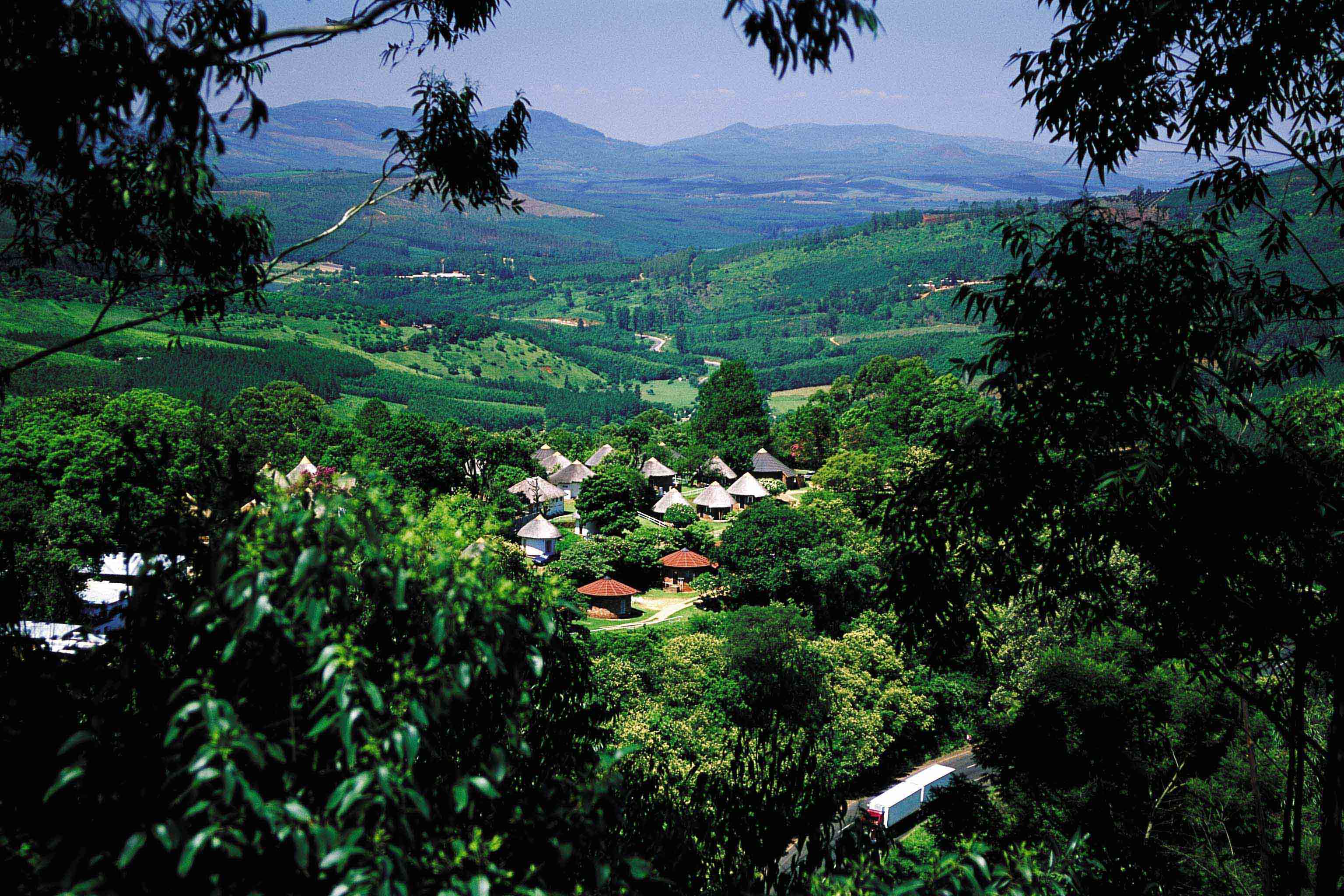
- Aerial view over Magoebaskloof
- Traversed by: R71

Third Approach
- Coordinates: 23°51′S 30°02′E
- Magoebaskloof (South Africa)

Magoebaskloof is a mountain pass in Limpopo Province, South Africa, between Tzaneen and Haenertsburg on the R71. It takes its name from Chief Makgoba and literally means "Makgoba's ravine".

It is a lush green mountainous area, covered by natural evergreen subtropical forest. This is an area where the small kingdom of Makgoba lived before they were conquered by Afrikaners who occupied Tzaneen area prior to 1905.

Today Magoebaskloof is a tourist attraction area which shows off its natural wonders such as the Debengeni (Dibekeni) waterfalls, Magoebaskloofdam and many forest hiking trails.
