= R531 (South Africa) =

Regional route in South Africa

Regional route R531

Route information
- Length: 73.5 km (45.7 mi)

Major junctions
- West end: R527 near Hoedspruit
- R40 in Klaserie
- East end: Orpen Gate of the Kruger National Park

Location
- Country: South Africa

Highway system
- Numbered routes of South Africa
← R529	→ R532

The R531 is a Regional Route in South Africa that connects The Oaks with the Orpen Gate of the Kruger National Park via Klaserie.

== Route ==
Its north-western terminus is a junction with the R527 at the Hoedspruit Reptile Centre (17 kilometres east of The Oaks and 12 kilometres west of Hoedspruit), just east of the R527's Blyde River crossing. From there, it heads south-east for 30 kilometres to reach a staggered junction with the R40 at the village of Klaserie (south of Kapama Game Reserve; north of Acornhoek) (co-signed for 2 kilometres). It then continues eastwards for 42 kilometres, following the boundary between Limpopo and Mpumalanga (bypassing Thornybush Game Reserve) before passing in-between the Timbavati Game Reserve to the north and the Manyeleti Game Reserve to the south. It ends at the Orpen Gate of the Kruger National Park.
