= Vukozi Bamuza =

South African cricketer (born 1991)

Personal information
- Full name: Vukosi Nhluvuko Bamuza
- Born: 23 June 1991 (age 35); Tzaneen, South Africa
- Batting: Right-handed
- Bowling: Right-arm fast-medium

Career statistics
Competition	FC	LA	T20
Matches	2	3	2
Runs scored	42	22	20
Batting average	14.00	7.33	10.00
100s/50s	0/0	0/0	0/0
Top score	39	9	10
Catches/stumpings	1/0	1/0	0/0
- Source: ESPNcricinfo, 4 September 2016

Vukozi Bamuza (born 23 June 1991) is a South African first-class cricketer. He is right-handed batsman and a right-arm fast medium bowler. He made his First Class debut for Free State against Western Province.
