= Dwarsfontein =

- Location within Limpopo Location within South Africa
- Coordinates: 23.766°S 30.105°E
- Country: South Africa
- Province: Limpopo
- District: Mopani
- Municipality: Greater Tzaneen

Area
  - Total: 0.45 km^{2} (0.17 sq mi)

Population (2001)
  - Total: 983
  - Density: 2,200/km^{2} (5,700/sq mi)

Racial makeup (2001)
  - Black African: 73.7%
  - Coloured: 4.9%
  - Indian/Asian: 0.9%
  - White: 20.5%

First languages (2001)
  - Northern Sotho: 45.2%
  - Afrikaans: 23.3%
  - Tsonga: 22.4%
  - English: 4.3%
  - Other: 4.8%
- Time zone: UTC+2 (SAST)

Dwarsfontein is a small settlement in Mopani District Municipality in the Limpopo province of South Africa.
