= Abel Erasmus Pass =

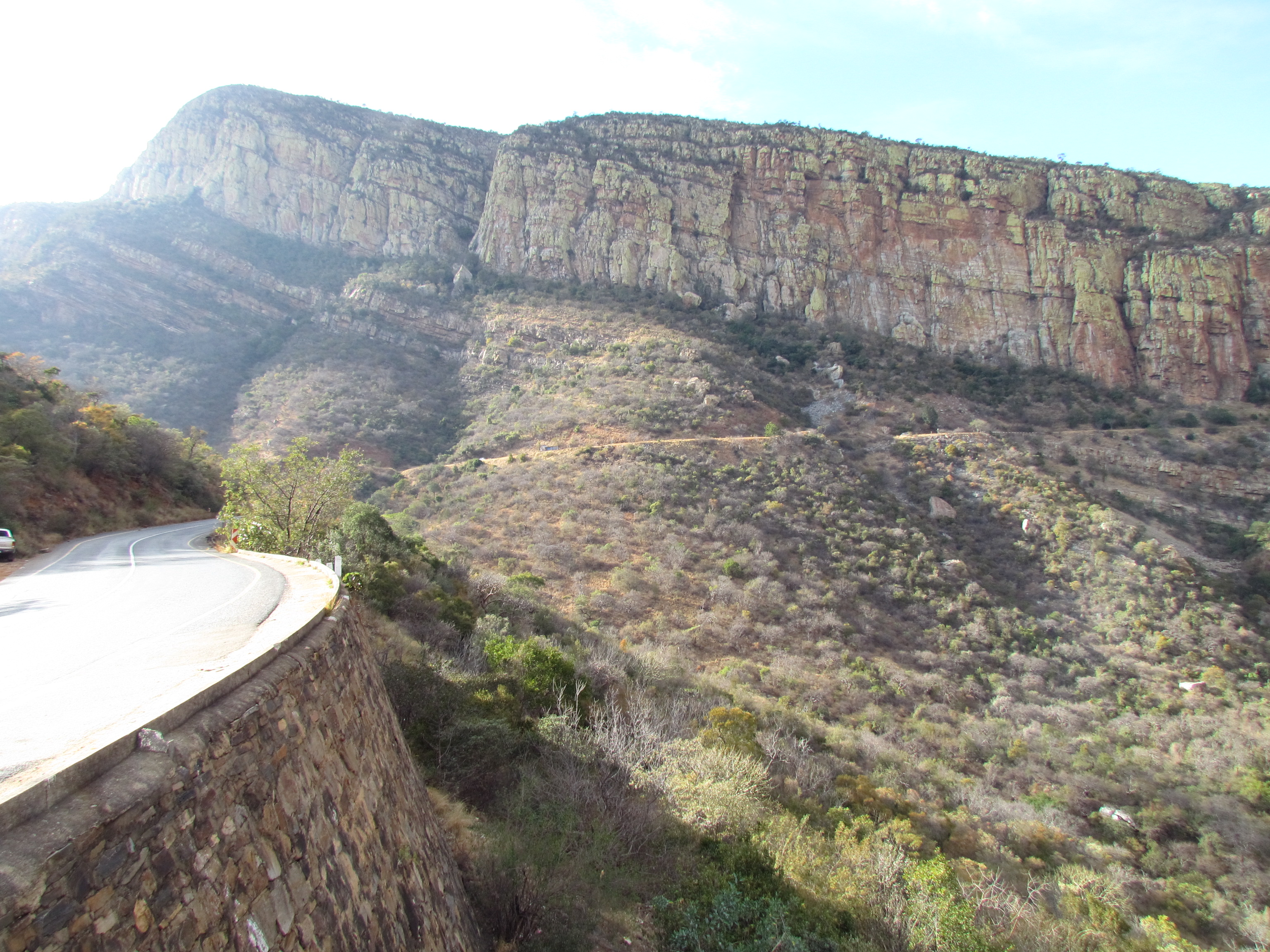
- View on the pass, standing at the J.G. Strijdom Tunnel

- Location within Limpopo Location within South Africa

Third Approach
- Location: Limpopo, South Africa
- Range: Limpopo Drakensberg
- Coordinates: 24°27′06″S 30°36′27″E

Abel Erasmus Pass is situated in the Limpopo Province, on the R36 road between Ohrigstad and Tzaneen, South Africa. It navigates the Manoutsa section of the Limpopo Drakensberg. Since 1959 the road passes through the 133 m long JG Strijdom Tunnel, named after late Prime Minister JG Strijdom. The pass is 11 km long and generally follows a coach route of the late 19th century.
