= Murchison, Limpopo =

Murchison
- Location within Limpopo Location within South Africa
- Coordinates: 23.892°S 30.694°E
- Country: South Africa
- Province: Limpopo
- District: Mopani
- Municipality: Ba-Phalaborwa

Area
  - Total: 5.85 km^{2} (2.26 sq mi)

Population (2011)
  - Total: 1,288
  - Density: 220/km^{2} (570/sq mi)

Racial makeup (2011)
  - Black African: 83.2%
  - Coloured: 0.5%
  - White: 16.2%

First languages (2011)
  - Tsonga: 37.2%
  - Afrikaans: 31.0%
  - Northern Sotho: 8.8%
  - English: 7.5%
  - Other: 15.5%
- Time zone: UTC+2 (SAST)
- PO box: 4250

Murchison is a town in Mopani District Municipality in the Limpopo province of South Africa.

Mining village 20 km north-east of Leydsdorp and 44 km west of Phalaborwa. Named after Sir Roderick Murchison, a geologist and former President of the Royal Geographical Society (RGS), who prospected in the area.
