= Mankweng =

- Location within Limpopo Location within South Africa
- Coordinates: 23.886°S 29.718°E
- Country: South Africa
- Province: Limpopo
- District: Capricorn
- Municipality: Polokwane

Area
  - Total: 11.97 km^{2} (4.62 sq mi)

Population (2011)
  - Total: 33,738
  - Density: 2,819/km^{2} (7,300/sq mi)

Racial makeup (2011)
  - Black African: 98.0%
  - Coloured: 0.8%
  - Indian/Asian: 0.3%
  - White: 0.6%
  - Other: 0.3%

First languages (2011)
  - Northern Sotho: 87.5%
  - Tsonga: 2.9%
  - English: 2.0%
  - Venda: 1.9%
  - Other: 5.7%
- Time zone: UTC+2 (SAST)
- Postal code (street): 0727
- PO box: 0727

Mankweng, also called Turfloop, is a township in Capricorn District Municipality in the Limpopo province of South Africa, and home to the University of Limpopo. It is a university township. Mankweng or Turfloop is also the de facto name for the neighbourhoods surrounding the township and the university, though relatively small to the likes of Grahamstown. It is located about 27 km east of Polokwane on the R71 road to Moria and Tzaneen.

== History ==
Mankweng developed in the 1960s when the University-College of the North was established by the apartheid regime in pursuit of its policy of racially segregated education. It was the hometown of the late ANC Youth League president, Peter Mokaba.

== University of Limpopo and Mankweng Hospital ==
Mankweng as a community is very dynamic, and draws skilled professionals into the area because the area houses a leading regional hospital, Mankweng Campus Hospital, a university (in the form of University of Limpopo), a regional Magistrate court, and a public library. In recent times, the area has been growing rapidly with local residents next to the University converting their homes into rental space in order to house the growing population of students from many parts of the country, with some coming from as far as East and North Africa.

== Transport ==
Transport to Mankweng from Polokwane ranges from buses to minibus taxis and private taxi services.

The R71 which is the main road to Mankweng and Tzaneen has thousands of vehicles driving on it daily, and congestion usually is seen in the morning and afternoons.

Mankweng is a hub for villages around it, so transport is readily available for those travelling to and from Mankweng. Moria, the ZCC church grounds, is only a few kilometers away from Mankweng and so during Easter and during any other church event, people from all over South Africa make a stop at Paledi Mall to freshen up before continuing with the journey to ZCC.

The main public bus services which operate around Mankweng are Great North Transport, Madodi and Bahwaduba Bus Service which is a bus service belonging to the ZCC.
