= Witklip Pass =

Mountain pass in South Africa

Witklip Pass is a mountain pass situated in the Mpumalanga province, on the R36 road between Machadodorp and Lydenburg (South Africa).
