= Ofcolaco =

- Location within Limpopo Location within South Africa
- Coordinates: 24.0802°S 30.395°E
- Country: South Africa
- Province: Limpopo
- District: Mopani
- Municipality: Maruleng
- Time zone: UTC+2 (SAST)
- Postal code (street): 0854
- PO box: 0854

Ofcolaco is a tiny village situated in the Limpopo province of South Africa that was named after the Officers Colonial Land Company and formed by demobilised British army officers after the First World War.

Settlement 43 km south-east of Tzaneen. Named after the Officers’ Colonial Land Company which purchased ground for settlement along the Selati River in 1920. These retired officers managed to make a reasonable living by cultivating citrus and subtropical fruit.

The shared facilities of the original Ofcolaco are long gone. Descendants of the original officers still live in the district and are proud of their heritage. The current Ofcolaco is basically a roadside service centre with a fueling station, farm equipment suppliers, liquor store, groceries store and a local market.
