= Ernst Roets =

South African political activist, writer, and filmmaker

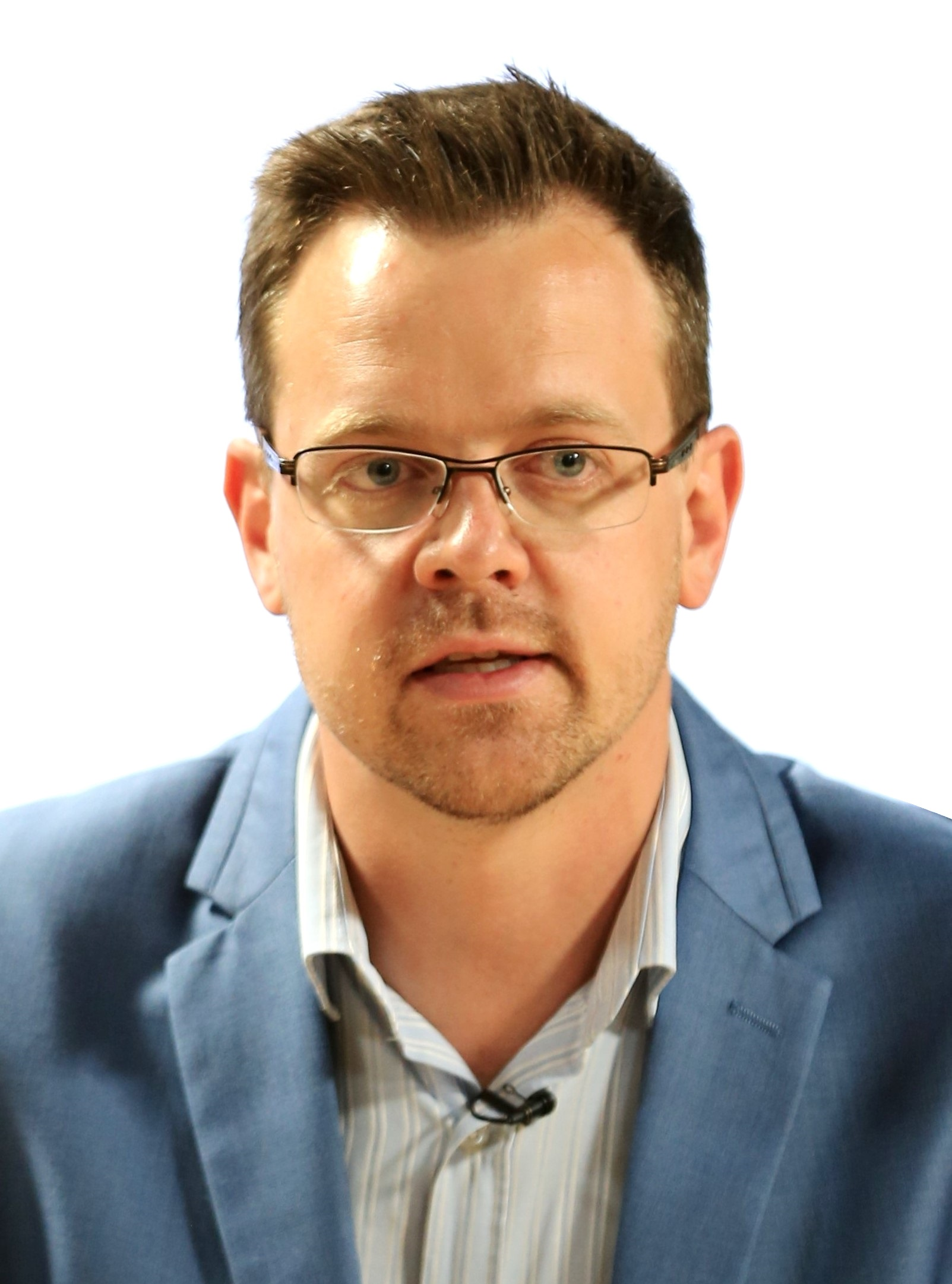
- Roets in 2016
- Born: Ernst Alex Roets; September 5, 1985 (age 41); Tzaneen, South Africa
- Education: University of Pretoria (LLB)
- Occupations: Writer, filmmaker
- Employer(s): AfriForum, Forum Films
- Spouse: Lelanie De Kock (m. 2009)
- Children: 4

Ernst Alex Roets (born 5 September 1985) is a South African writer and filmmaker. He is the Executive Director of Lex Libertas.

== Early life and education ==
Roets grew up in the agricultural town of Tzaneen where he matriculated in 2003 from the Merensky High School. He obtained his LLB degree in 2009 from the University of Pretoria. During his student years he served in various leadership structures, including the Student Representative Council (SRC) and the Senate, at this university.

During his student years Roets served as founding member and the first National Chairperson of Solidarity Youth. In 2008 Solidarity Youth changed its name and the organisation was converted to AfriForum Youth. In 2016, Roets obtained his LLM degree in Public Law with distinction from the UP. The title of his dissertation was ’n Peiling van die middele kragtens die Suid-Afrikaanse Grondwet, ter afdwinging van die basiese regte van minderheidsgemeenskappe.

== Career ==
Roets was arrested in 2010 after he attempted to install a billboard with the words “Welcome to Pretoria” next to the N1 highway. This action was in protest against the Tshwane Metropolitan Municipality’s use of the word “Tshwane” to refer to the capital during the 2010 Fifa Football World Cup.

In 2011 Roets was appointed as Deputy CEO of AfriForum. He testified on behalf of AfriForum in 2011 in the case of AfriForum vs. Malema. On behalf of AfriForum he submitted a charge of hate speech against Julius Malema after Malema sang the song “Dubul' ibhunu” (Shoot the Boer) at various political gatherings. The court found Malema guilty of hate speech. The South African Human Rights Commission (HRC) is currently appealing the decision to the Gauteng High Court, arguing in favor of Malema's right to chant "Kill the Boer".

In May 2018, following criticism of Afriforum by a North-West University professor, Elmien du Plessis, Roets posted a YouTube video where he used an analogy to describe his anger at the denial of the extent of farm murders, by academics like du Plessis, by quoting Victor Klemperer, a Jew who survived the Holocaust, who after the Holocaust wrote that "If one day the situation were reversed and the fate of the vanquished lay in my hands, then I would let all the ordinary folk go and even some of the leaders, who might perhaps after all have had honourable intentions and not known what they were doing. But I would have all the intellectuals strung up, and the professors three feet higher than the rest; they would be left hanging from the lampposts for as long as was compatible with hygiene", referring to his anger at academics and others who in Klemperer's words "had given intellectual support to Nazism". Following the video posting, du Plessis and her family received threats of violence. A petition condemning the threats against academics was subsequently circulated.

In February 2025, Roets resigned from the Solidarity Movement, stating that he wished to “live out his calling.”

== Personal life ==
He is the son of Sarel Arnoldus and Irma Mariette (née Ernst) of Orania. Roets married Lelanie (née De Kock) on 5 December 2009 and has four children. He is also part of a heavy metal band called "Soms Wen Die Wolf".

== Filmography ==
=== Tainted Heroes ===
Tainted Heroes is a South African documentary film that was produced by Forum Films and directed by Elrich Yssel, with Roets and Beatrice Pretorius as producers. The film is about the violent battle of the African National Congress (ANC) against apartheid in South Africa between 1976 and 1994. The documentary is based on the book People’s War: New Light on the Struggle for South Africa by Anthea Jeffery.

=== Crossed Out: Confronting Persecution in South Africa ===
In September 2026, Ernst Roets co-directed and co-produced the documentary Crossed Out: Confronting Persecution in South Africa alongside Pierre Malan and Marie-Louise de Nysschen. Released under the Lex Libertas think tank as part of the "White Cross Project," the film examines farm attacks, race-based legislation, and minority property rights, and received screenings in Washington, D.C., including a private event at the White House. You can read more details at Lex Libertas.

== Bibliography ==
=== Kill The Boer ===
Kill the Boer: Government Complicity in South Africa's Brutal Farm Murders is a South African book that was published by Ernst Roets in 2018. The book, which later became a bestseller on Amazon, is about the issue of farm attacks in South Africa. The book describes in detail what farm attacks are, provides data on the number of attacks and murders and also deals with why these attacks are unique and potentially politically or racially motivated. The book also deals with Apartheid and land dispossession and how these, together with the singing of “Dubul' ibhunu” (Shoot the Boer), have factored into the current crisis of farm murders. Lastly, the book provides statistical evidence that the mainstream news media in South Africa have been disproportionately over-reporting on incidents where farmers are or allegedly are perpetrators of violence, compared to incidents where farmers and their families are victims, often murder.
