= Tzaneen Dam =

Tzaneen (old Fanie Botha) Dam
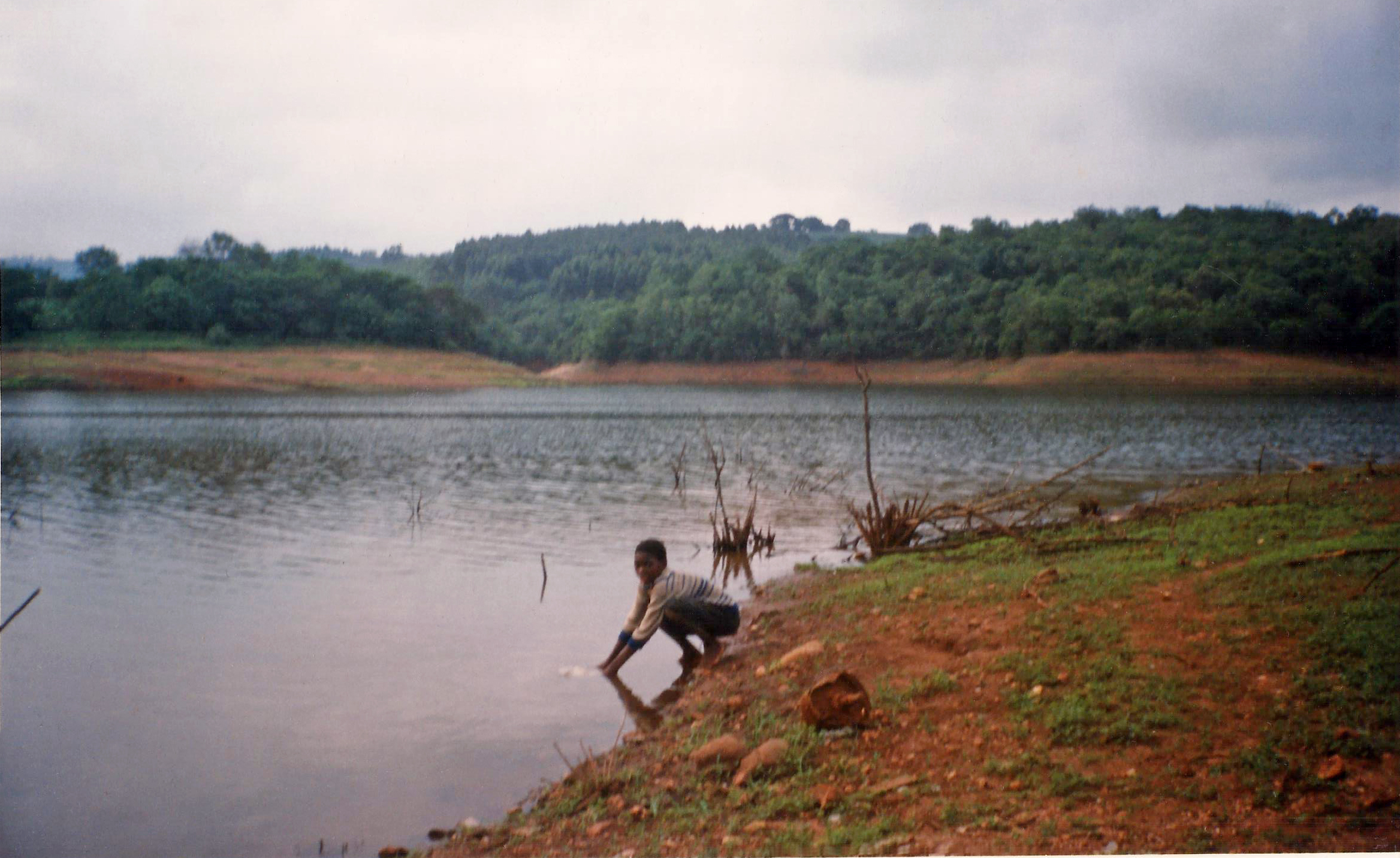
- Interactive map of Tzaneen (old Fanie Botha) Dam
- Official name: Tzaneen Dam
- Location: Limpopo, South Africa
- Coordinates: 23°47′37″S 30°9′48″E
- Purpose: Irrigation and domestic
- Opening date: 1976
- Operator: Department of Water Affairs

Dam and spillways
- Type of dam: Earth fill dam
- Impounds: Groot Letaba River
- Height: 50 metres (160 ft)
- Length: 1,140 metres (3,740 ft)

Reservoir
- Creates: Tzaneen Dam Reservoir
- Total capacity: 157,291,000 cubic metres (5.5547×10^{9} cu ft)
- Surface area: 1,163.6 hectares (2,875 acres)

Tzaneen Dam is an earth-fill type dam located on the Groot Letaba River, near Tzaneen, Limpopo, South Africa. After Cyclone Eloise that emanated from the Mozambique side, the dam was certified 110% full by the Department of Water and Sanitation. The dam supplies domestic water to Polokwane and Tzaneen, and irrigation water to the Letaba valley. The hazard potential of the dam has been ranked high (3).

== See also ==
- List of reservoirs and dams in South Africa
- List of rivers of South Africa
