= Nkowankowa =

- Location within Limpopo Location within South Africa
- Coordinates: 23.886°S 30.293°E
- Country: South Africa
- Provi: Limpopo
- District: Mopani
- Municipality: Greater Tzaneen

Government
  - Councillor: Homegirl Zandamela (ANC)

Area
  - Total: 16.23 km^{2} (6.27 sq mi)

Population (2011)
  - Total: 22,484
  - Density: 1,385/km^{2} (3,588/sq mi)

Racial makeup (2011)
  - Black African: 99.2%
  - Coloured: 0.4%
  - Indian/Asian: 0.2%
  - White: 0.1%
  - Other: 0.1%

First languages (2011)
  - Tsonga: 83.2%
  - Northern Sotho: 7.8%
  - Sotho: 2.9%
  - English: 1.9%
  - Other: 4.2%
- Time zone: UTC+2 (SAST)
- Postal code (street): 0870
- PO box: 0870
- Area code: 015

Nkowankowa is a township in the Greater Tzaneen Local Municipality of the Mopani District Municipality in the Limpopo province of South Africa. It is home to soccer development team called Nkowankowa Barcelona FC and Ritavi cross warriors athletics club.

== Industry ==
The township hosts one of the biggest industrial parks located in a Township around the country as an effect of government intervention between 1982 and 1993.

== Education ==
Nkowankowa has various primary and secondary schools:

Primary Schools:

- Nkowankowa Lower Primary
- Bombeleni Primary
- Bright Morning Star Primary
- Dududu Junior Primary
- Masungulo-2 Primary
- Ritavi Senior Primary

Intermediate School:

- Progress Junior

Secondary Schools:

- Hudson Ntsanwisi Senior Secondary
- Dzj Mthebule High School
- Bankuna High School

Combined Schools:

- Meridian College
- St George College

== Notable residents ==
Former Limpopo premier and now deputy minister of police, Cassel Mathale, former public protector, Lawrence Mushwana, 2019 Limpopo Sports Awards nominee Gladwin Khosa (Blue Bulls Rugby Union/Limpopo), Ebony Khama, long distance runner Samuel Ntsan'wisi and also upcoming sprinter Tiyani Mitshabe come from Nkowankowa.

== Shops ==
Notable shops in Nkowankowa include: Highpoint Supermarket and Restaurant, Muyi Enterprise, Miami Chicken Grill, Chisa Grill, Chicken Kwasa and Limitless Cakes, Confectionery and Empire dot creative
