= Modimolle–Mookgophong Local Municipality elections =

The Modimolle–Mookgophong Local Municipality municipal council consists of twenty-eight members elected by mixed-member proportional representation. Fourteen councillors are elected by first-past-the-post voting in nine wards, while the remaining fourteen are chosen from party lists so that the total number of party representatives is proportional to the number of votes received.

== Results ==
The following table shows the composition of the council after past elections.

| Event | ANC | DA | EFF | FF+ | Total |
|---|---|---|---|---|---|
| 2016 election | 13 | 7 | 6 | 2 | 28 |
| 2021 election | 14 | 7 | 4 | 3 | 28 |

== August 2016 municipal election ==
In the election of 3 August 2016 the African National Congress (ANC) won a plurality of thirteen seats on the council but failed to win an overall majority. On 23 August 2016, the council subsequently elected Marlene van Staden, the mayoral candidate of the Democratic Alliance (DA), as the new mayor.

The following table shows the results of the 2016 election.

| Party | Ward | | | List | | | Total seats |
| Party | Votes | % | Seats | Votes | % | Seats | Total seats |
|---|---|---|---|---|---|---|---|
| African National Congress | 13,764 | 47.75 | 11 | 13,650 | 47.41 | 2 | 13 |
| Democratic Alliance | 6,763 | 23.46 | 3 | 7,130 | 24.76 | 4 | 7 |
| Economic Freedom Fighters | 5,625 | 19.51 | 0 | 5,578 | 19.37 | 6 | 6 |
| Freedom Front Plus | 1,684 | 5.84 | 0 | 1,705 | 5.92 | 2 | 2 |
| Mookgophong Party | 393 | 1.36 | 0 | 360 | 1.25 | 0 | 0 |
| Congress of the People | 142 | 0.49 | 0 | 339 | 1.18 | 0 | 0 |
| Independent candidates | 395 | 1.37 | 0 | | | | 0 |
| Pan Africanist Congress of Azania | 60 | 0.21 | 0 | 30 | 0.10 | 0 | 0 |
| Total | 28,826 | 100.00 | 14 | 28,792 | 100.00 | 14 | 28 |
| Valid votes | 28,826 | 98.83 | | 28,792 | 98.54 | | |
| Invalid/blank votes | 341 | 1.17 | | 428 | 1.46 | | |
| Total votes | 29,167 | 100.00 | | 29,220 | 100.00 | | |
| Registered voters/turnout | 50,680 | 57.55 | | 50,680 | 57.66 | | |

== November 2021 municipal election ==
The following table shows the results of the 2021 election.

| Party | Ward | | | List | | | Total seats |
| Party | Votes | % | Seats | Votes | % | Seats | Total seats |
|---|---|---|---|---|---|---|---|
| African National Congress | 12,386 | 49.94 | 12 | 12,363 | 49.72 | 2 | 14 |
| Democratic Alliance | 5,708 | 23.01 | 1 | 5,798 | 23.32 | 6 | 7 |
| Economic Freedom Fighters | 3,635 | 14.66 | 0 | 3,648 | 14.67 | 4 | 4 |
| Freedom Front Plus | 2,578 | 10.39 | 1 | 2,530 | 10.18 | 2 | 3 |
| African Christian Democratic Party | 173 | 0.70 | 0 | 163 | 0.66 | 0 | 0 |
| African Transformation Movement | 100 | 0.40 | 0 | 92 | 0.37 | 0 | 0 |
| African People's Convention | 87 | 0.35 | 0 | 61 | 0.25 | 0 | 0 |
| Africa Restoration Alliance | 79 | 0.32 | 0 | 61 | 0.25 | 0 | 0 |
| Kingdom Covenant Democratic Party | 11 | 0.04 | 0 | 83 | 0.33 | 0 | 0 |
| Azanian People's Organisation | 6 | 0.02 | 0 | 31 | 0.12 | 0 | 0 |
| Patriotic Alliance | 16 | 0.06 | 0 | 11 | 0.04 | 0 | 0 |
| Economic Emancipation Forum | 12 | 0.05 | 0 | 14 | 0.06 | 0 | 0 |
| African People's Movement | 11 | 0.04 | 0 | 9 | 0.04 | 0 | 0 |
| Total | 24,802 | 100.00 | 14 | 24,864 | 100.00 | 14 | 28 |
| Valid votes | 24,802 | 98.80 | | 24,864 | 98.44 | | |
| Invalid/blank votes | 300 | 1.20 | | 394 | 1.56 | | |
| Total votes | 25,102 | 100.00 | | 25,258 | 100.00 | | |
| Registered voters/turnout | 50,580 | 49.63 | | 50,580 | 49.94 | | |

=== By-elections from November 2021 ===
The following by-elections were held to fill vacant ward seats in the period from the election in November 2021.

| Date | Ward | Party of the previous councillor | Party of the newly elected councillor |
|---|---|---|---|
| 3 August 2022 | 93608012 | Democratic Alliance | Democratic Alliance |
