= Leydsdorp =

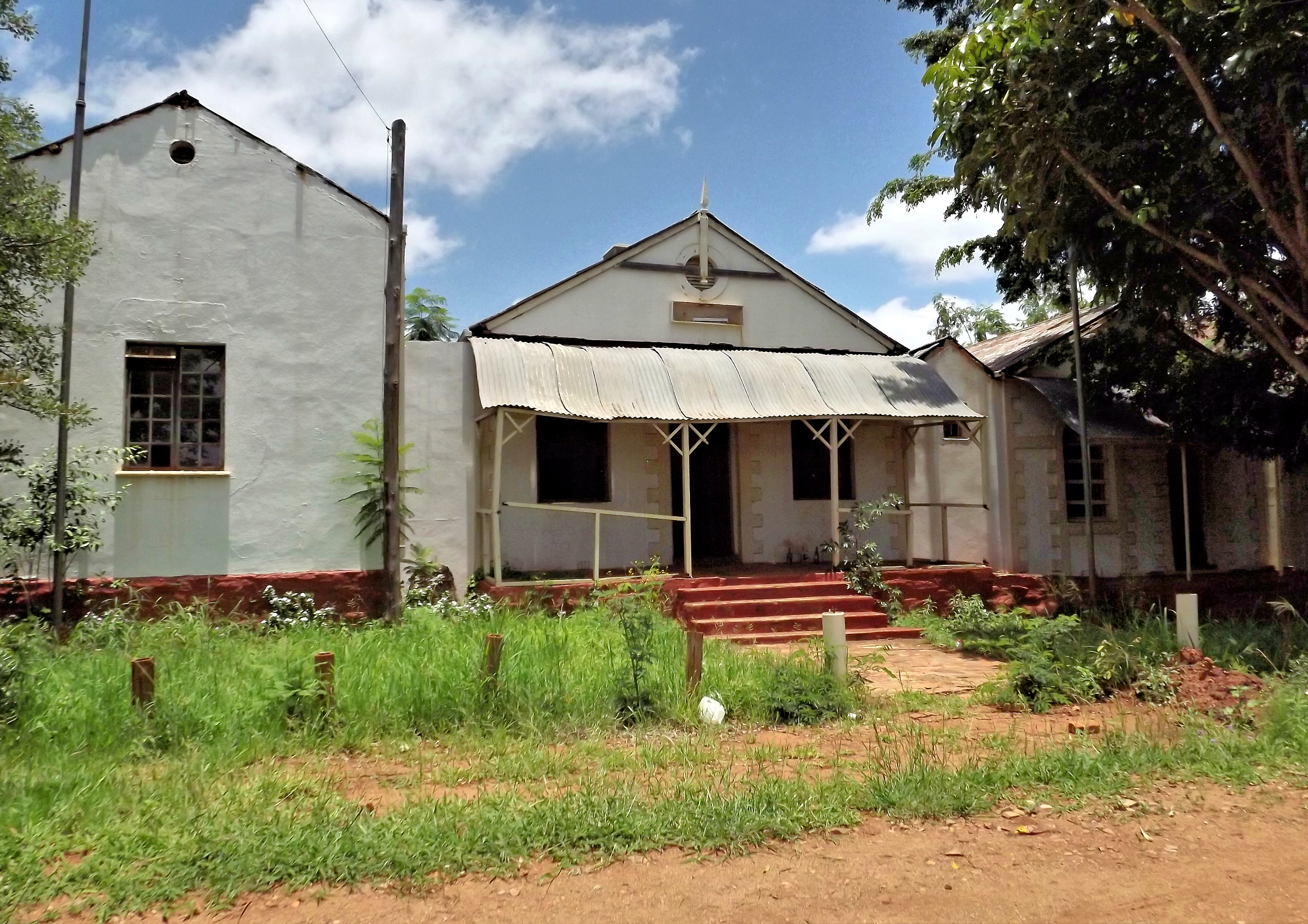
- Abandoned hotel in Leydsdorp

- Location within Limpopo Location within South Africa
- Coordinates: 23.995°S 30.521°E
- Country: South Africa
- Province: Limpopo
- District: Mopani
- Municipality: Ba-Phalaborwa
- Established: 1890

Area
  - Total: 0.79 km^{2} (0.31 sq mi)

Population (2011)
  - Total: 6
  - Density: 7.6/km^{2} (20/sq mi)

Racial makeup (2011)
  - Black African: 100.0%

First languages (2011)
  - Tsonga: 100.0%
- Time zone: UTC+2 (SAST)

Leydsdorp is a former gold rush town situated in the Limpopo province of South Africa.

This ghost town is 11 kilometres (6.8 mi) south-west of Gravelotte and 53 kilometres (33 mi) south-east of Tzaneen. It developed from a gold-mining camp and was proclaimed in 1890, but was virtually abandoned when gold was discovered on the Witwatersrand. Named after Willem Johannes Leyds (1859–1940), state secretary of the South African Republic from 1888 to 1897. The Leydsdorp Hotel (now open) is a great place for travelers to stop for a lunch and drinks.

== See also ==
- SanWild Wildlife Sanctuary, a nearby wildlife rehabilitation center and reserve
