= Gravelotte, South Africa =

Gravelotte
- Location within Limpopo Location within South Africa
- Coordinates: 23°57′S 30°37′E
- Country: South Africa
- Province: Limpopo
- District: Mopani
- Municipality: Ba-Phalaborwa

Area
  - Total: 1.98 km^{2} (0.76 sq mi)

Population (2011)
  - Total: 1,098
  - Density: 555/km^{2} (1,440/sq mi)

Racial makeup (2011)
  - Black African: 94.6%
  - Coloured: 0.2%
  - White: 5.2%

First languages (2011)
  - Tsonga: 55.2%
  - Northern Sotho: 23.5%
  - Sotho: 12.0%
  - Afrikaans: 5.2%
  - Other: 4.1%
- Time zone: UTC+2 (SAST)
- Postal code (street): 0895
- PO box: 0895
- Area code: 015

Gravelotte is a small town situated in the east of the Limpopo province of South Africa.

Mining centre 10 km north-east of Leydsdorp and 52 km north-west of Hoedspruit. It was established in 1916 and named after the farm owned by a Prussian missionary who had fought in the European Battle of Gravelotte (1870–71).

== Transport ==
Gravelotte is located on the R71 route, and Gravelotte railway station connects the town to Mica, Hoedspruit, Acornhoek and Kaapmuiden to the south, and connects to Tzaneen, Duiwelskloof and Soekmekaar to the north.
