= Moria, South Africa =

Moria
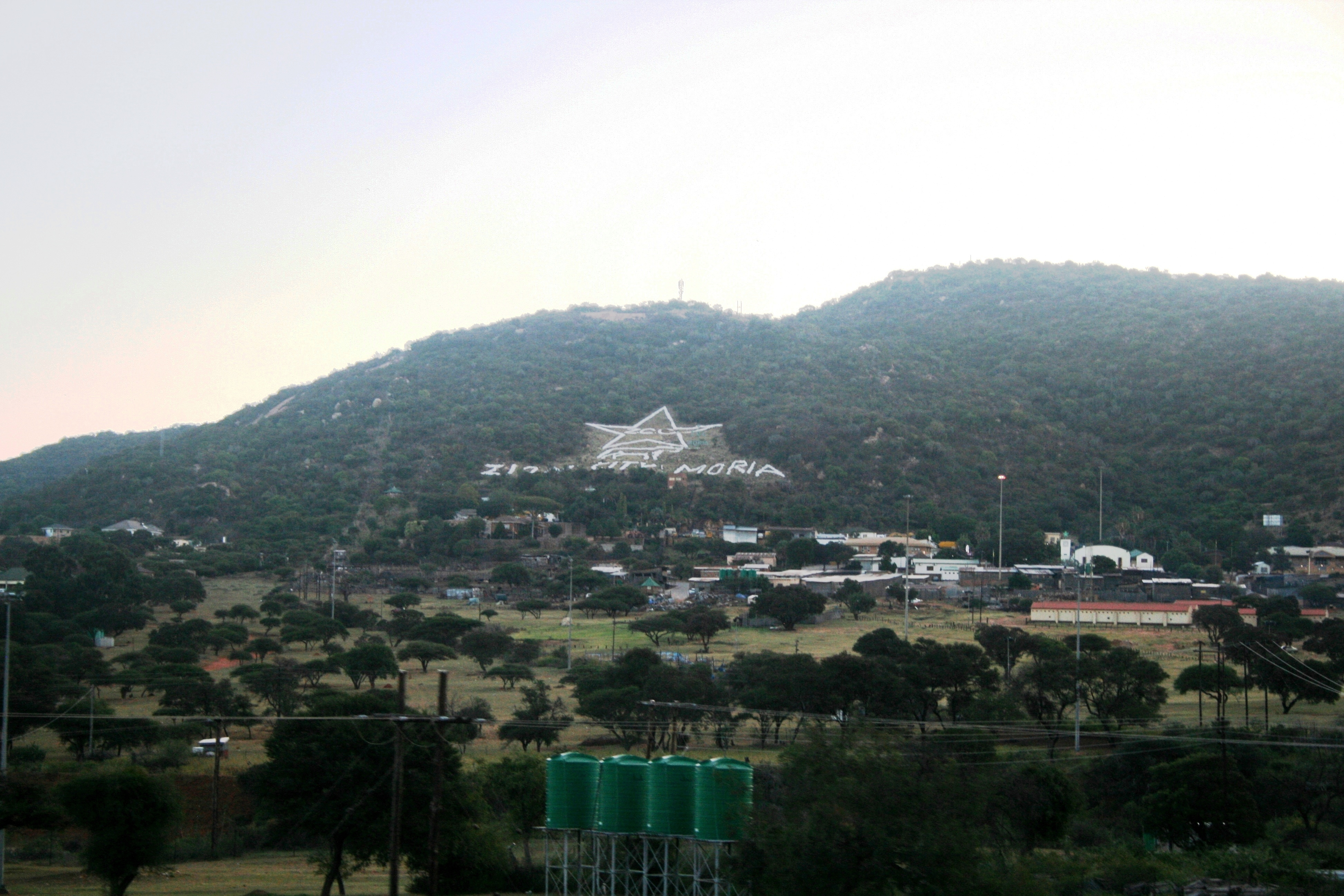
- Zion City Moria beside the R71 route, Limpopo

- Location within Limpopo Location within South Africa
- Coordinates: 23.938°S 29.791°E
- Country: South Africa
- Province: Limpopo
- District: Capricorn
- Municipality: Polokwane
- Main Place: GaMokwane

Area
  - Total: 5.06 km^{2} (1.95 sq mi)

Population (2011)
  - Total: 2,887
  - Density: 571/km^{2} (1,480/sq mi)

Racial makeup (2011)
  - Black African: 99.7%
  - Coloured: 0.2%
  - Indian/Asian: 0.0%
  - White: 0.1%

First languages (2011)
  - Northern Sotho: 75.3%
  - Tswana: 6.4%
  - Tsonga: 3.4%
  - Zulu: 3.3%
  - Other: 11.6%
- Time zone: UTC+2 (SAST)

Moria is a town in Capricorn District Municipality in the Limpopo province of South Africa.
