= Bandelierkop =

- Location within Limpopo Location within South Africa
- Coordinates: 23.323°S 29.802°E
- Country: South Africa
- Province: Limpopo
- District: Vhembe
- Municipality: Makhado
- Time zone: UTC+2 (SAST)
- PO box: 0800

Bandelierkop is a village some 35 km south-west of Louis Trichardt and 70 km north-east of Polokwane on the N1 national route. Afrikaans for 'bandolier hill"; said to have been named after an incident in which a burgher, Jan du Preez, was sent back to fetch the bandolier he had left behind when the commando struck camp.
