= Haenertsburg =

Haenertsburg (Bjatladi)
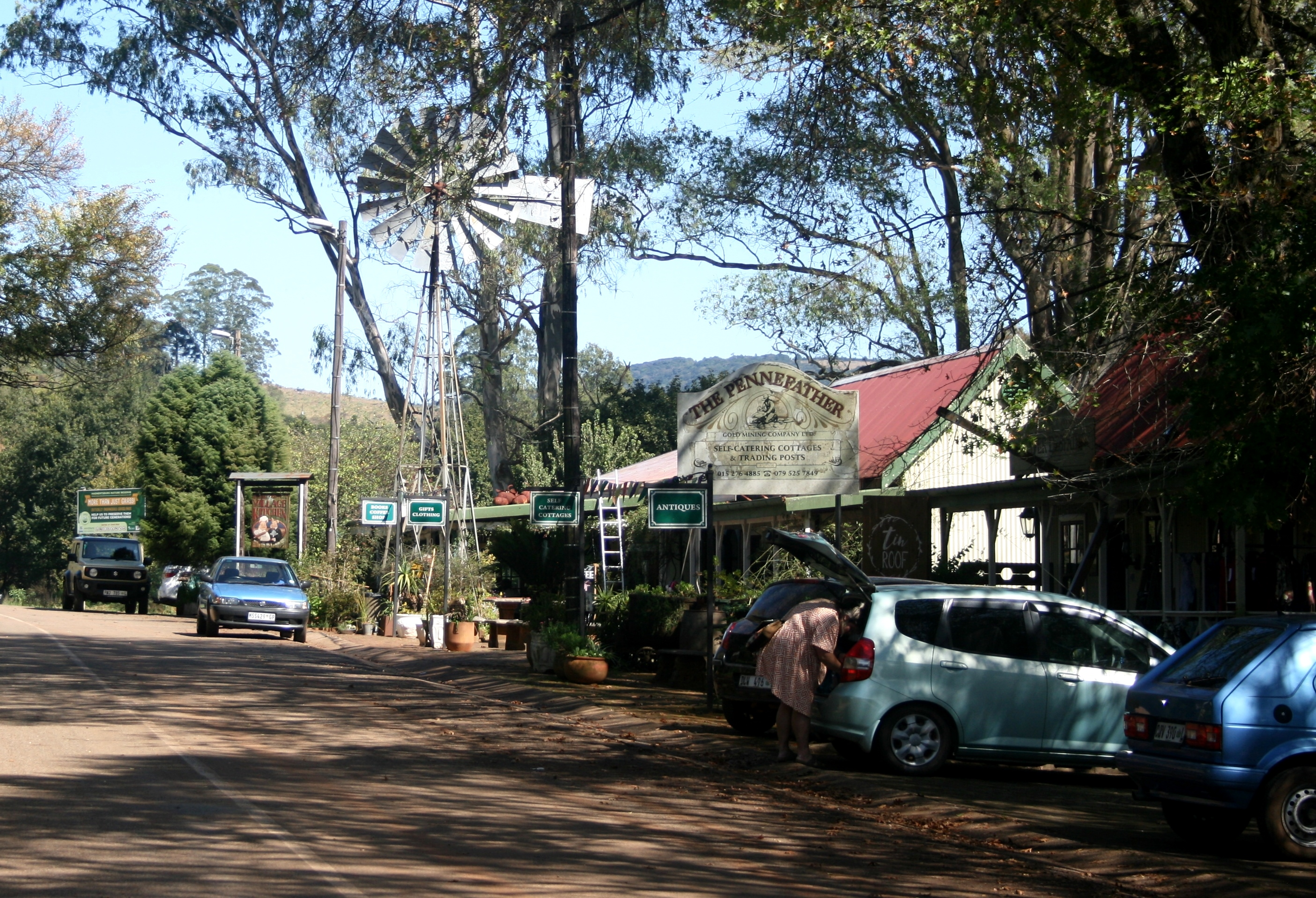
- Commercial premises in Rissik Street

- Location within Limpopo Location within South Africa
- Coordinates: 23°56′30″S 29°56′20″E
- Country: South Africa
- Province: Limpopo
- District: Mopani
- Municipality: Greater Tzaneen

Area
  - Total: 1.23 km^{2} (0.47 sq mi)

Population (2011)
  - Total: 282
  - Density: 229/km^{2} (594/sq mi)

Racial makeup (2011)
  - Black African: 25.9%
  - Coloured: 0.7%
  - White: 73.4%

First languages (2011)
  - English: 52.3%
  - Afrikaans: 23.1%
  - Northern Sotho: 16.7%
  - Tsonga: 2.8%
  - Other: 5.0%
- Time zone: UTC+2 (SAST)
- PO box: 0730
- Area code: 015

Haenertsburg is a village situated on the edge of the Great Escarpment in the Limpopo Province of South Africa, on the R71 road between Polokwane (formerly: Pietersburg) and Tzaneen en route to the Kruger National Park.

Farming and tourism are the main economic activities on "The Mountain" as it is locally known; Haenertsburg is in hilly terrain. The Iron Crown mountain is the highest point in Limpopo and is a well-known landmark.

Frequent mists and relatively high rainfall have created a lush vegetation with afromontane forest patches occupying the kloofs (gullies) which dot the grasslands and surrounding mountains. However, large areas of rare, and botanically diverse, grassland (Woodbush Granite Grassland) have been planted to timber (primarily timber for pulping). These monoculture plantations extract a great deal of water and the resulting water shortages downstream (in the Kruger National Park and Mozambique) are cause for concern. A local volunteer group, FROHG (Friends of the Haenertsburg Grasslands) helps to conserve the indigenous flora and fauna. Funds are raised to create educational materials, maintain a hiking trail, remove alien invasive plants and alert the authorities to illegal developments like bulldozing for pipelines, fencing and even squatting.

The scenery of the Haenertsburg area attracts many tourists. It is a common spot for cycling, biking and fishing. Sailing and other watersport take place on nearby Ebenezer Dam. The 20th steepest mountain pass in South Africa, the Magoebaskloof pass, leads one down from the Highveld of the Haenertsburg area to the Lowveld adjoining the Kruger National Park, gaining/losing 446m altitude in 5.15 km.

Haenertsburg is also known for the annual Spring Fair where various crafts and flower displays are exhibited. July sees the advent of the Holistic Fair which displays the creative talents of the Mountain folk. Every Friday and Saturday morning the Morning Market is run by the Duchess of Atholl.

The town was established in 1886 with the discovery of gold by Carl Ferdinand Haenert.

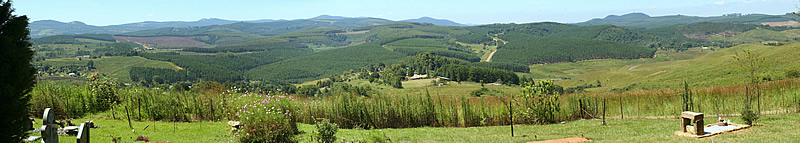
View over Haenertsburg from the cemetery above the town
