= Letsitele =

- Location within Limpopo Location within South Africa
- Coordinates: 23°53′S 30°24′E
- Country: South Africa
- Province: Limpopo
- District: Mopani
- Municipality: Greater Tzaneen

Area
  - Total: 1.36 km^{2} (0.53 sq mi)

Population (2011)
  - Total: 406
  - Density: 299/km^{2} (773/sq mi)

Racial makeup (2011)
  - Black African: 17.7%
  - White: 80.8%
  - Other: 1.5%

First languages (2011)
  - Afrikaans: 81.3%
  - Tsonga: 7.9%
  - English: 4.2%
  - Northern Sotho: 2.2%
  - Other: 4.4%
- Time zone: UTC+2 (SAST)
- Postal code (street): 0885
- PO box: 0885
- Area code: 015

Letsitele is a small town situated in the Limpopo province of South Africa. It is a farming district, primarily citrus, tobacco, beef cattle and other fruits.
