= Greater Tzaneen Local Municipality =

Coordinates: 23°50′S 30°15′E

Greater Tzaneen
- Local municipality
- Seal

- Location in Limpopo
- Country: South Africa
- Province: Limpopo
- District: Mopani
- Seat: Tzaneen
- Wards: 34

Government
  - Type: Municipal council
  - Mayor: Gerson Molapisane (ANC)

Area
  - Total: 3,243 km^{2} (1,252 sq mi)

Population (2011)
  - Total: 390,095
  - Density: 120.3/km^{2} (311.5/sq mi)

Racial makeup (2011)
  - Black African: 96.4%
  - Coloured: 0.2%
  - Indian/Asian: 0.4%
  - White: 3.0%

First languages (2011)
  - Sepedi: 46.2%
  - Tsonga: 40.9%
  - Sotho: 4.3%
  - Afrikaans: 2.6%
  - Other: 6%
- Time zone: UTC+2 (SAST)
- Municipal code: LIM333

Greater Tzaneen Municipality (Northern Sotho: Mmasepala wa Greater Tzaneen; Tsonga: Masipala wa Greater Tzaneen) is a local municipality within the Mopani District Municipality, in the Limpopo province of South Africa. The seat of the municipality is Tzaneen.

== Main places ==
The 2001 census divided the municipality into the following main places:

Place	Code	Area (km^{2})	Population	Most spoken language
Bakgaga Ba Maake	90301	14.37	12,651	Northern Sotho
Bakgage	90302	14.54	14,923	Northern Sotho
Vankuna	90303	448.79	151,014	Tsonga
Batlhabine Ba Magoboya	90304	65.26	17,883	Northern Sotho
Dwarsfontein	90305	0.45	983	Northern Sotho
Haenertsburg	90307	1.04	481	English
Letsitele	90308	1.16	310	Afrikaans
Modjadji	90309	315.69	84,386	Northern Sotho
N'wamitwa	90310	165.78	36,344	Tsonga
Nyavana	90311	44.36	8,783	Tsonga
Tzaneen	90312	18.80	6,959	Afrikaans
Remainder of the municipality	90306	2,149.54	40,856	Northern Sotho

== Politics ==
The municipal council consists of sixty-nine members elected by mixed-member proportional representation. Thirty-five councillors are elected by first-past-the-post voting in thirty-five wards, while the remaining thirty-four are chosen from party lists so that the total number of party representatives is proportional to the number of votes received. In the election of 3 August 2016 the African National Congress (ANC) won a majority of fifty-two seats on the council. The following table shows the results of the election.

Party	Votes				Seats		
Party	Ward	List	Total	%	Ward	List	Total
ANC	70,135	71,135	141,270	75.2	33	19	52
EFF	10,717	11,222	21,939	11.7	0	8	8
DA	8,520	8,672	17,192	9.2	2	5	7
APC	1,017	1,078	2,095	1.1	0	1	1
Independent	1,616	–	1,616	0.9	0	–	0
COPE	731	707	1,438	0.8	0	1	1
VF+	443	403	846	0.4	0	0	0
ACDP	165	418	583	0.3	0	0	0
Tzaneen Freedom Party	147	206	353	0.2	0	0	0
PAC	105	192	297	0.2	0	0	0
UDM	48	88	136	0.1	0	0	0
IFP	18	66	84	0.0	0	0	0
Total	93,662	94,187	187,849	100.0	35	34	69
Spoilt votes	1,162	1,288	2,450				
