= Tzaneen =

Tzaneen Tsaneng
- Town
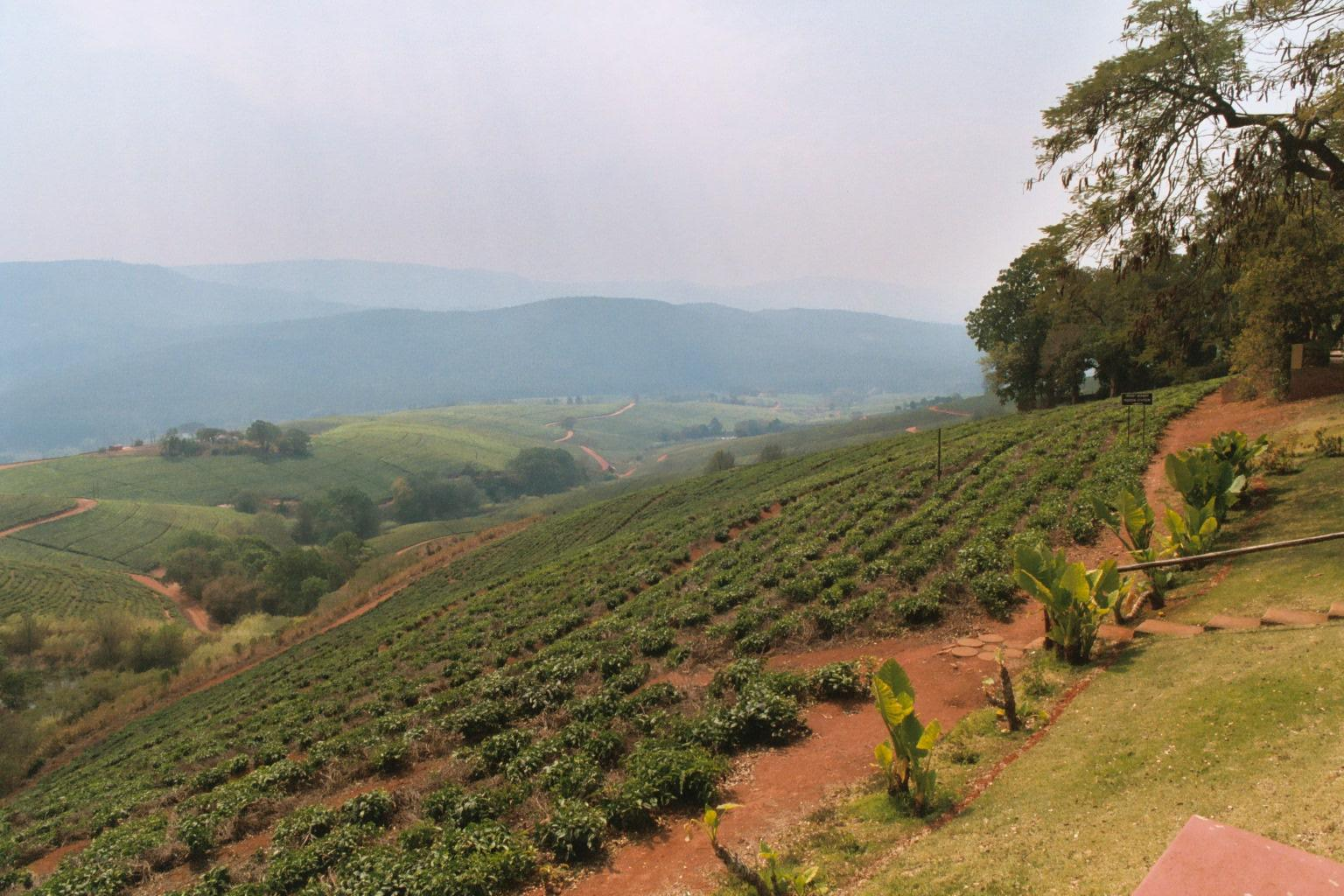
- Tea and more plantation in Tzaneen

- Location within Limpopo Location within South Africa Location within Africa
- Coordinates: 23°50′S 30°10′E
- Country: South Africa
- Province: Limpopo
- District: Mopani
- Municipality: Greater Tzaneen
  - Councillor: (ANC)

Area
  - Total: 22.16 km^{2} (8.56 sq mi)
- Elevation: 719 m (2,359 ft)

Population (2011)
  - Total: 14,571
  - Density: 657.5/km^{2} (1,703/sq mi)

Racial makeup (2011)
  - White: 46.1%
  - Black African: 45.0%
  - Indian/Asian: 7.0%
  - Coloured: 1.0%
  - Other: 0.9%

First languages (2011)
  - Afrikaans: 41.5%
  - Northern Sotho: 18.1%
  - Tsonga: 13.5%
  - English: 13.4%
  - Other: 6.4%
- Time zone: UTC+2 (SAST)
- Postal code (street): 0850
- PO box: 0850
- Area code: 015

Tzaneen (/zəˈniːn/) is a town in the Mopani district of Limpopo Province in South Africa. Situated in a high rainfall very fertile area with tropical and subtropical agriculture with an area of 20,000 square kilometres (7,700 sq mi). It is Limpopo's second largest town after Polokwane.

About 475,000 people reside within a 30 km (19 mi) radius, and a population of 14,571 according to the 2011 census.

== Geology and geography ==
The Wolkberg area is one of only two areas in the world where the critically endangered butterfly, Lepidochrysops lotana, is found.

== Weather ==
The summer months, September – March, have an average temperature of 28 °C (82 °F) and winter months around 15 °C (59 °F). Rainfall averages 800 mm (31 in) per year in town to over 1,500 mm (59 in) per year in the mountains.

== Notable people ==
- Hudson William Edison Ntsanwisi (11 July 1920 - 23 March 1993), first chief minister of Gazankulu bantustan
- Tito Mboweni (1959–2024), businessman, economist and former central banker
- Cassel Mathale (born 1961), former Limpopo Premier, Current DP
- Marchant de Lange (born 1990), international cricketer
- Master KG (born 1996), singer, record producer
- King Monada (born 1992), singer
- Mahlatse "Chiliboy" Ralepelle (born 1986), rugby player
- Trevor Nyakane (born 1989), South African rugby union player
- Judas Moseamedi (born 1994), PSL player
- Andrew Rabutla (born 1971), former Jomo Cosmos F.C. player
- Ernst Roets (born 1985), Deputy CEO of Lex Libertas
- Peta Teanet (1966–1996), Music Producer and Singer
- Benny Mayengani (born 1979), Singer
- Ndavi Nokeri (born 1999), Miss South Africa 2022
