= Limpopo =

Northernmost province of South Africa

- Province
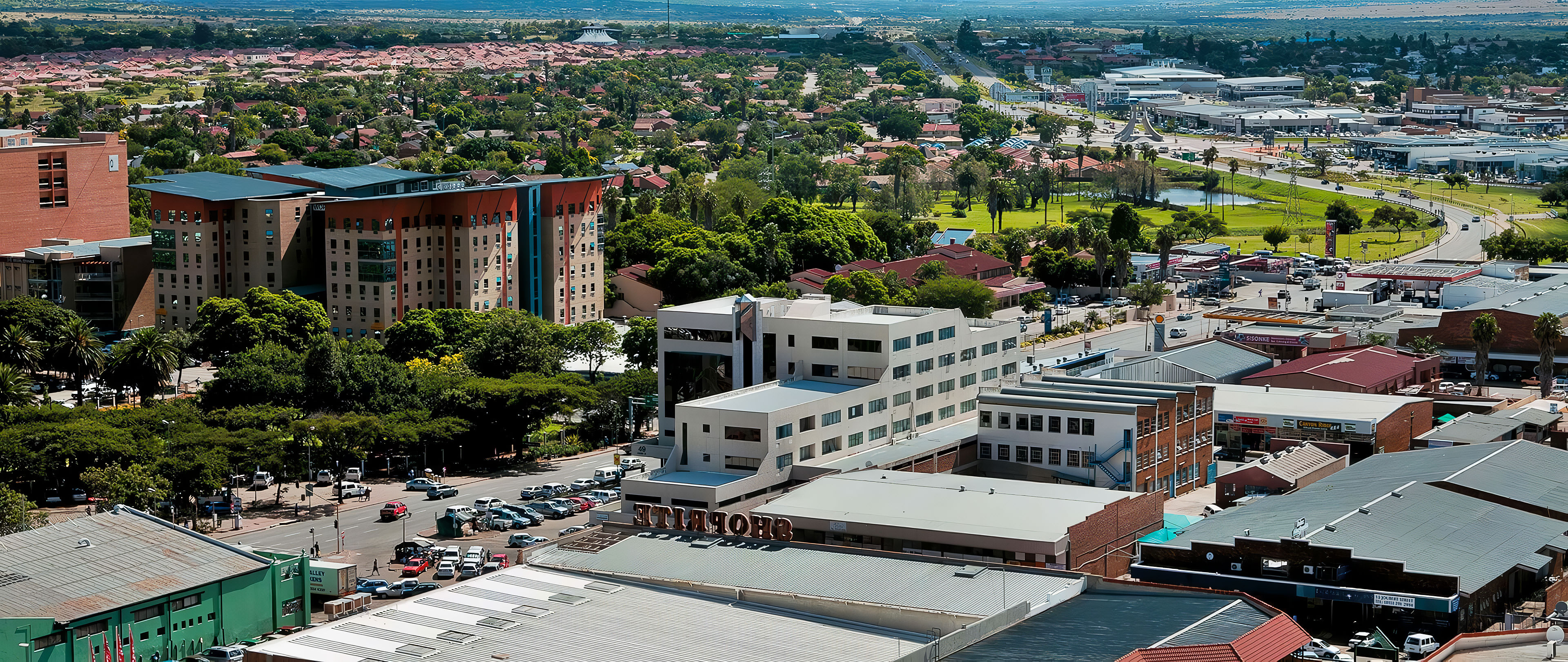
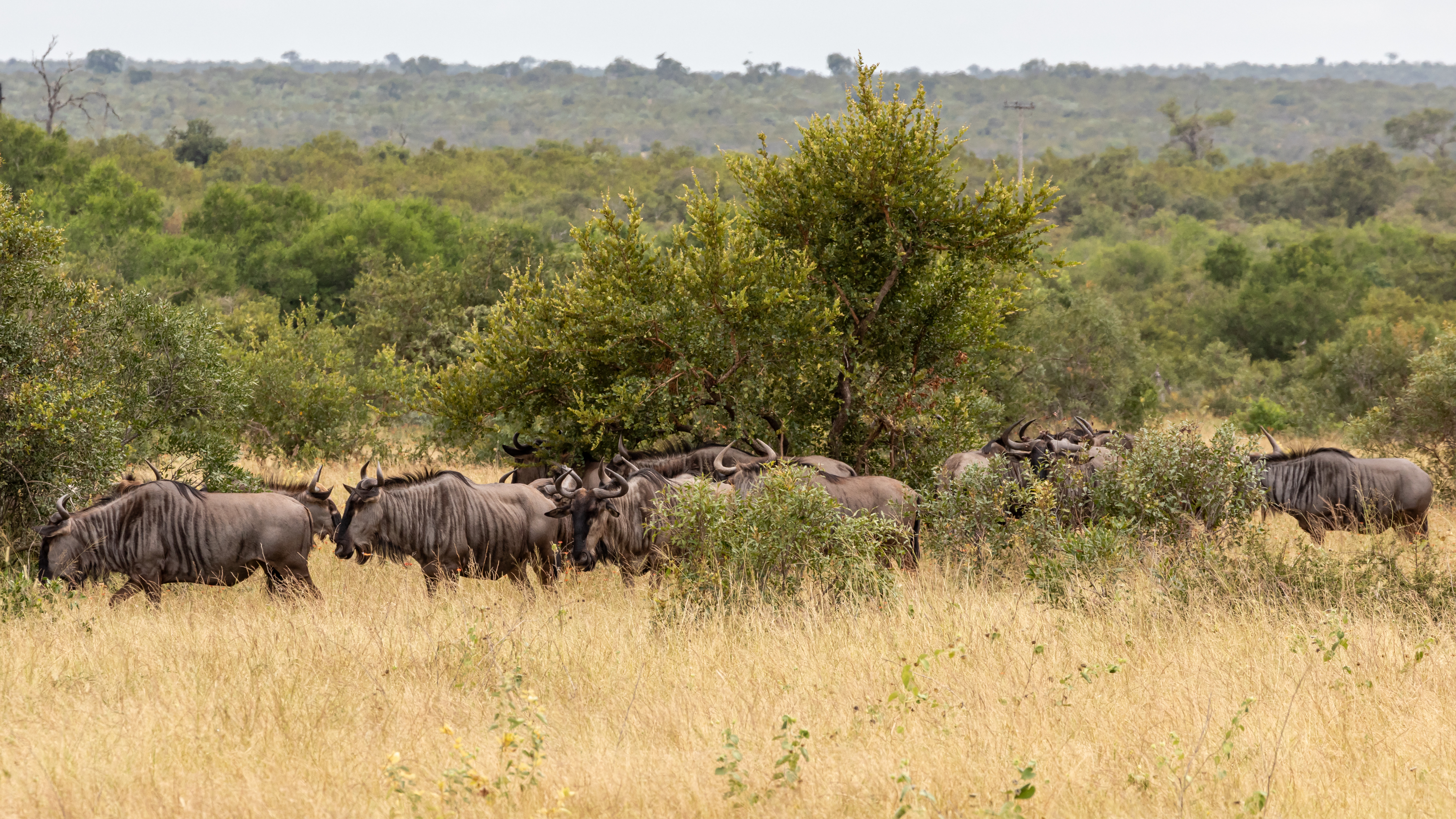
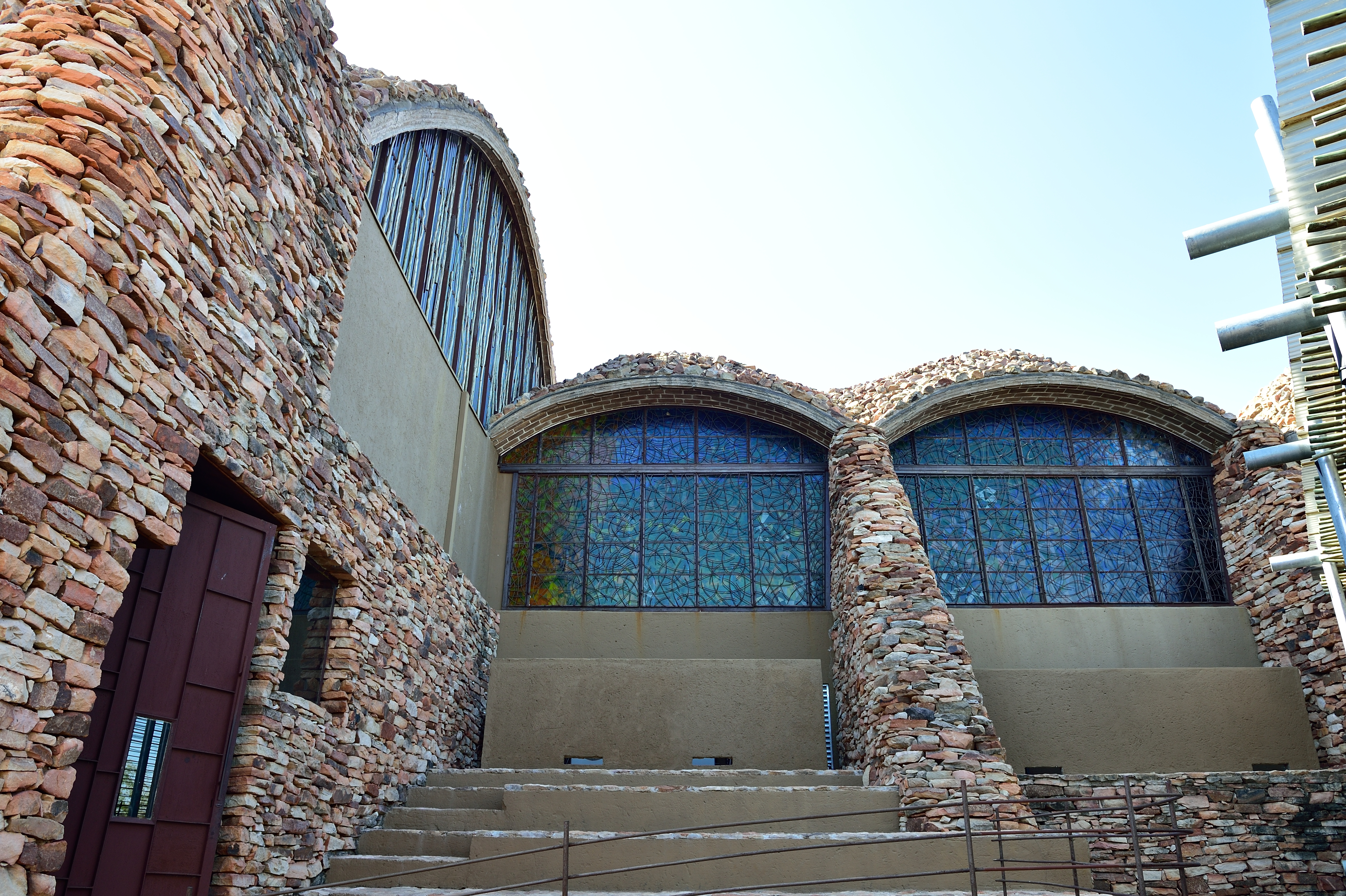
- Polokwane, capital of Limpopo Kruger National Park Mapungubwe Interpretation Centre

- Coat of arms
- Motto(s): Peace, Unity and Prosperity
- Location of Limpopo in South Africa
- Coordinates: 24°S 29°E
- Country: South Africa
- Established: 27 April 1994
- Capital: Polokwane
- Districts: List: Mopani; Vhembe; Capricorn; Waterberg; Sekhukhune

Government
  - Type: Parliamentary system
  - Premier: Phophi Ramathuba (ANC)
  - Legislature: Limpopo Provincial Legislature

Area
  - Total: 125,754 km^{2} (48,554 sq mi)
  - Rank: 5th in South Africa
- Highest elevation: 2,126 m (6,975 ft)

Population (2022)
  - Total: 5,404,868
  - Rank: 5th in South Africa
  - Density: 42.9797/km^{2} (111.317/sq mi)
  - Rank: 5th in South Africa

Population groups (2022)
  - Black: 96%
  - White: 3.1%
  - Indian or Asian: 0.5%
  - Coloured: 0.3%
  - Other: 0.1%

Languages (2022)
  - Pedi: 55.5%
  - Venda: 17.4%
  - Tsonga: 17.3%
  - Afrikaans: 2.3%
  - Shona: 1.6%
  - Tswana: 1.4%
  - Southern Ndebele: 1.1%
  - English: 1.0%
- Time zone: UTC+2 (SAST)
- ISO 3166 code: ZA-LP
- HDI (2019): 0.710 high · 3rd of 9
- GDP: US$31.3 billion
- Website: www.limpopo.gov.za

Limpopo
- Zulu: eLimpompo
- Xhosa: eLimpompo
- Afrikaans: Limpopo
- Sepedi: Limpopo
- Swazi: eLimbombo
- Sesotho: Limpopo
- Setswana: Limpopo
- Xitsonga: Limpopo
- Venda: Limpopo
- Southern Ndebele: iLimphopho
- Khoekhoe: Gõgõ!hub

Limpopo (/lɪmˈpoʊpoʊ/) is the northernmost province of South Africa. It is named after the Limpopo River, which forms the province's western and northern borders. The capital and largest city in the province is Polokwane, while the provincial legislature is situated in Lebowakgomo.

The province is made up of three former Bantustans - Lebowa, Gazankulu and Venda - and part of the former Transvaal province. The Limpopo province was established as one of nine provinces after the 1994 South African general election. The province's name was first Northern Transvaal, and was changed to Northern Province on 28 June 1995, with two other provinces. The name was changed again in 2002 to Limpopo Province. Limpopo is made up of three main ethnic groups: the Pedi, the Tsonga and the Venda.

Traditional leaders and chiefs still form a strong backbone of the province's political landscape. Established in terms of the Limpopo House of Traditional Leaders Act, Act 5 of 2005, the Limpopo House of Traditional Leaders' main function is to advise the government and the legislature on matters related to custom, tradition, and culture, including developmental initiatives that affect rural communities. On 18 August 2017, Kgosi Malesela Dikgale was re-elected as the Chairperson of the Limpopo House of Traditional Leaders.

== Name ==
The term "Limpopo" is derived from Rivombo (Livombo/Lebombo), a group of Tsonga settlers led by Hosi Rivombo who settled in the mountainous vicinity and named the area after their leader. The Lebombo mountains are also named after them. The river has been called the Vhembe by local Venda communities of the area.

Until 1994 it was the northern part of the former Transvaal Province. For a short period since 1994 it was called the province of Northern Transvaal and thereafter, through the Constitution of the public of South Africa Amendment Act No. 20 of 1995 from July 1995 initially Northern Province. The province was named after the Limpopo River by decision of the provincial assembly in 2002, and at the same time most of the cities on its territory were renamed. However, the renaming of the province required an amendment to the South African constitution, which was passed with an amending law was made in 2003.

== History ==
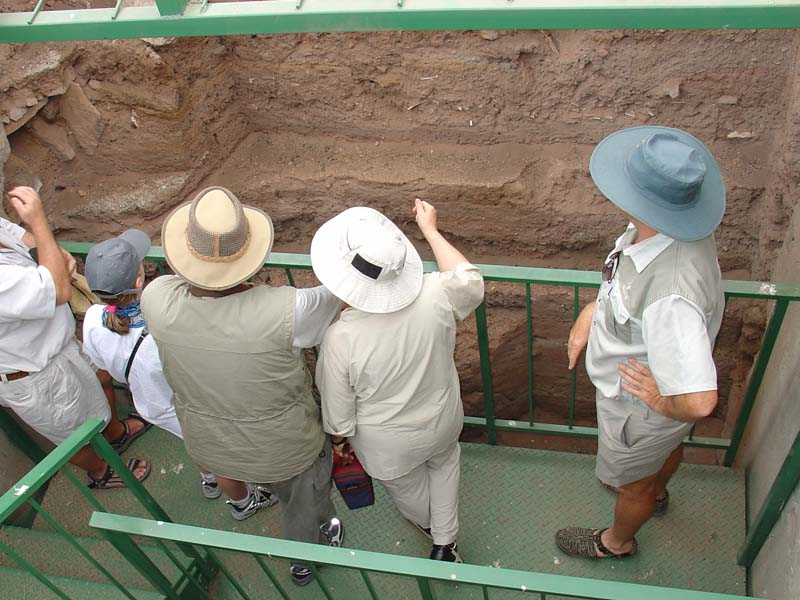
Archaeological excavations in Mapungubwe

The world heritage site of Mapungubwe National Park boasts archaeological finds from the period of a powerful local kingdom that ruled here between 800 CE and 1290 existed. The remains of a settlement from the period between the 15th and 17th century can be seen in Thulamela in the northern part of the Kruger National Park.

Until 1994 it was the northern part of the former Transvaal Province. For a short period since 1994 it was called the Province of Northern Transvaal and thereafter, through the Constitution of the public of South Africa Amendment Act No. 20 of 1995 from July 1995 initially Northern Province. The province was named after the Limpopo River by decision of the provincial assembly in 2002, and at the same time most of the cities on its territory were renamed. However, the renaming of the province required an amendment to the South African constitution, which was passed with an amending law was made in 2003.

In 2013, Stan Mathabatha replaced his predecessor Cassel Mathale (both ANC) as Prime Minister.

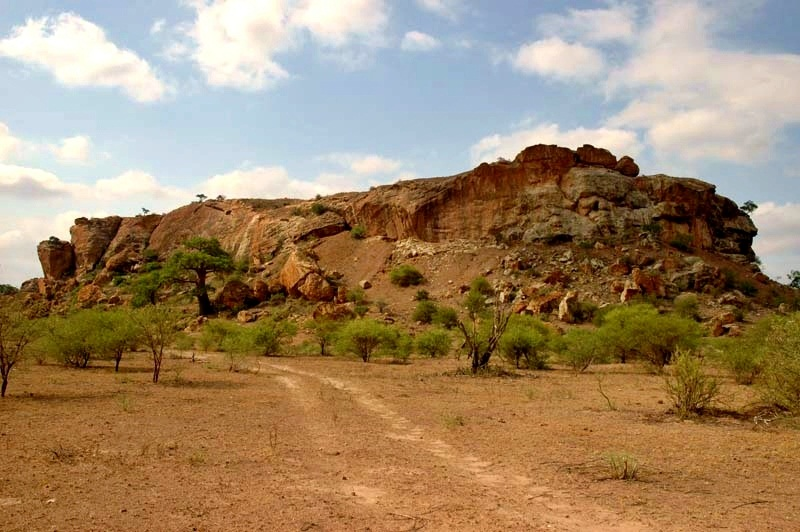
Mapungubwe Hill

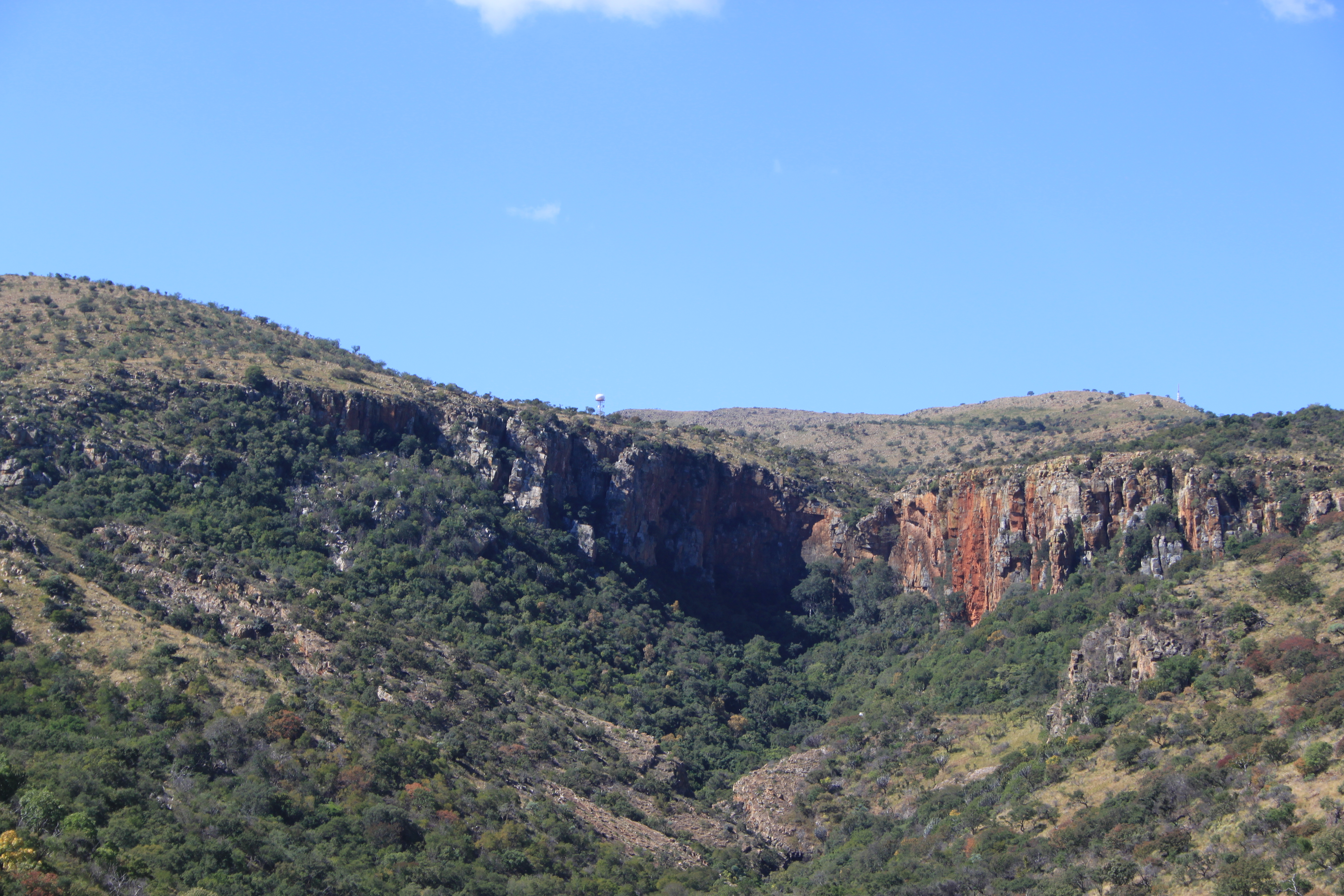
Makapan valley

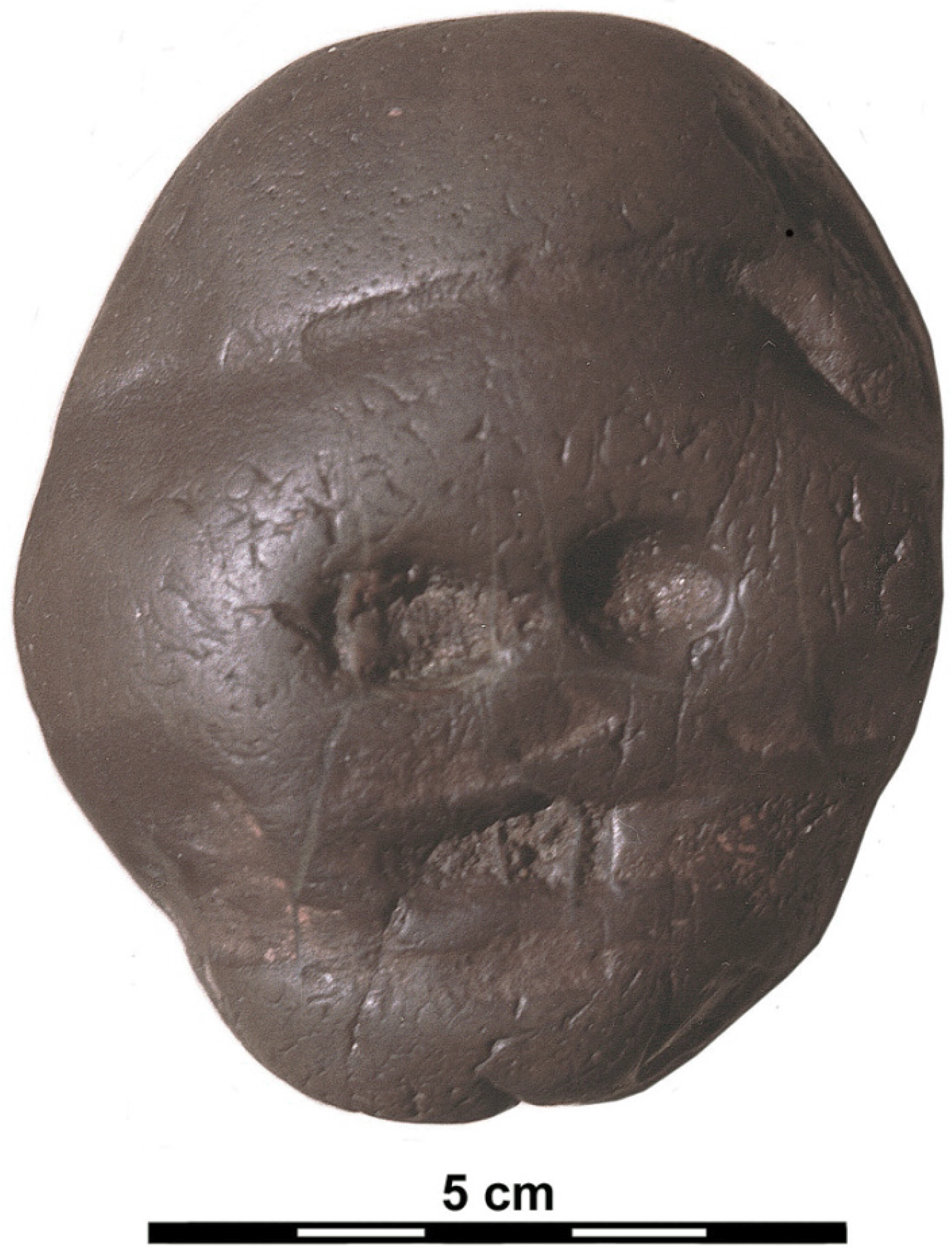
Makapansgat pebble

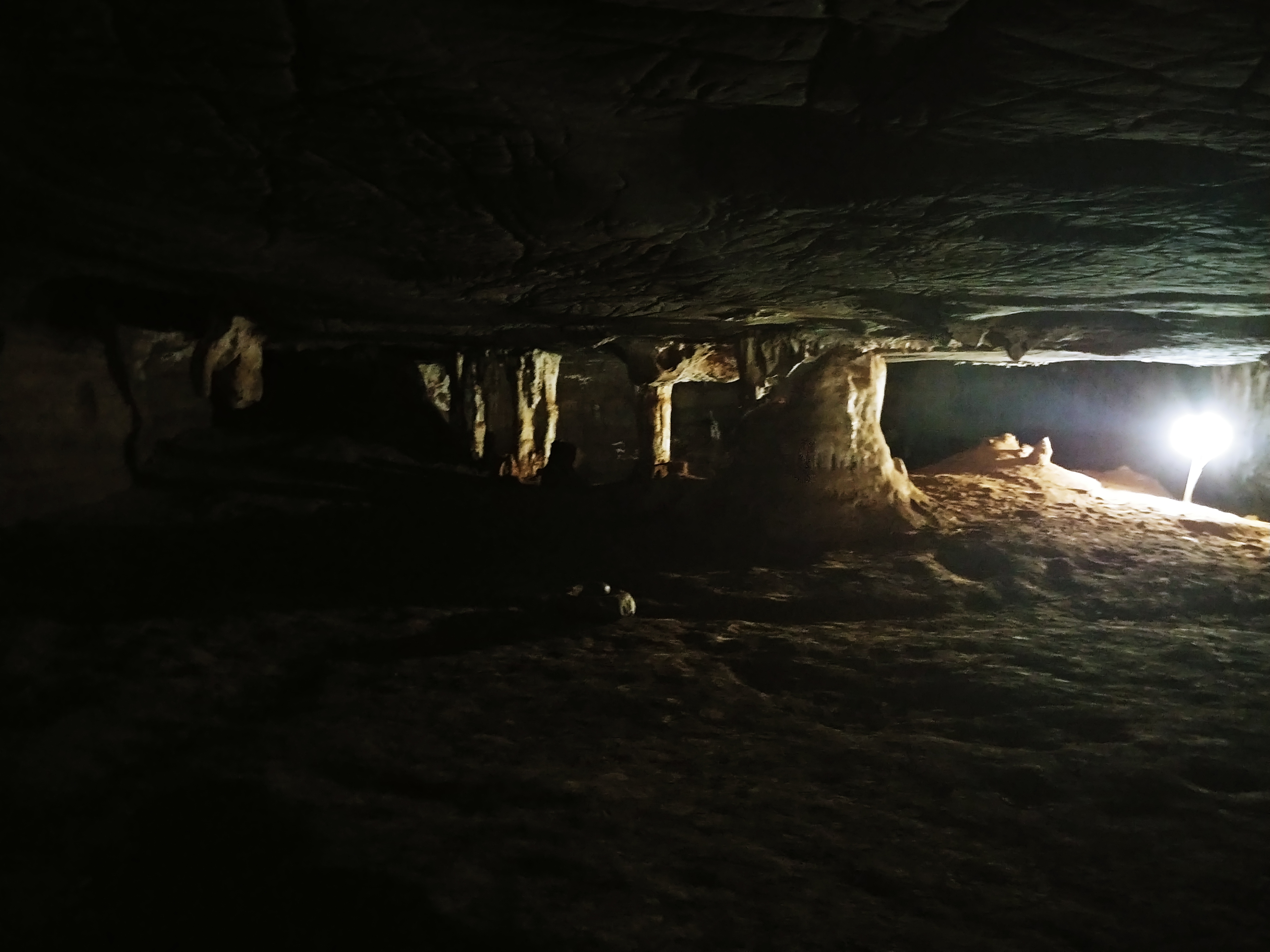
Samson Chamber at the Echo caves

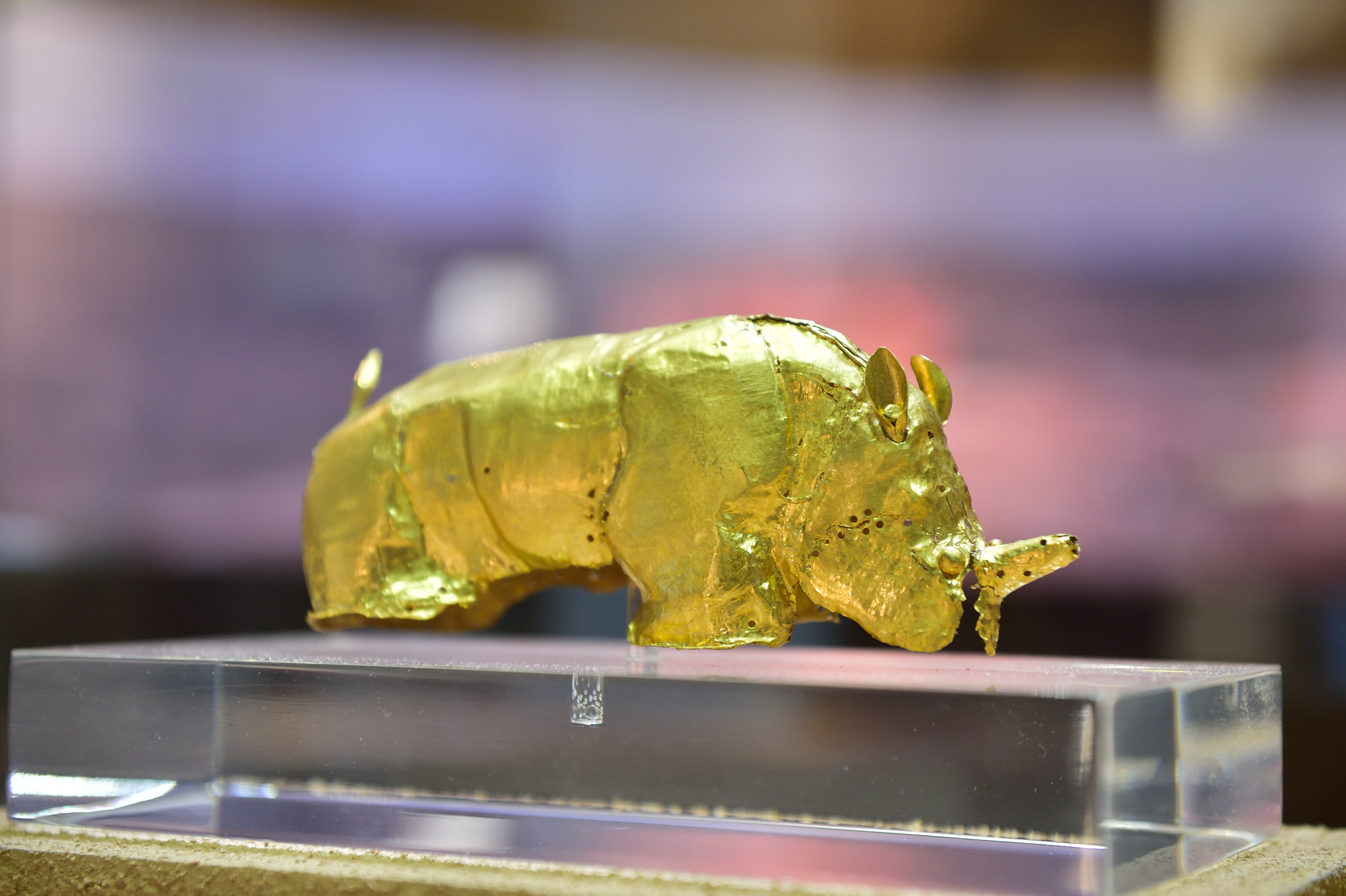
The Golden Rhinoceros

== Geography ==
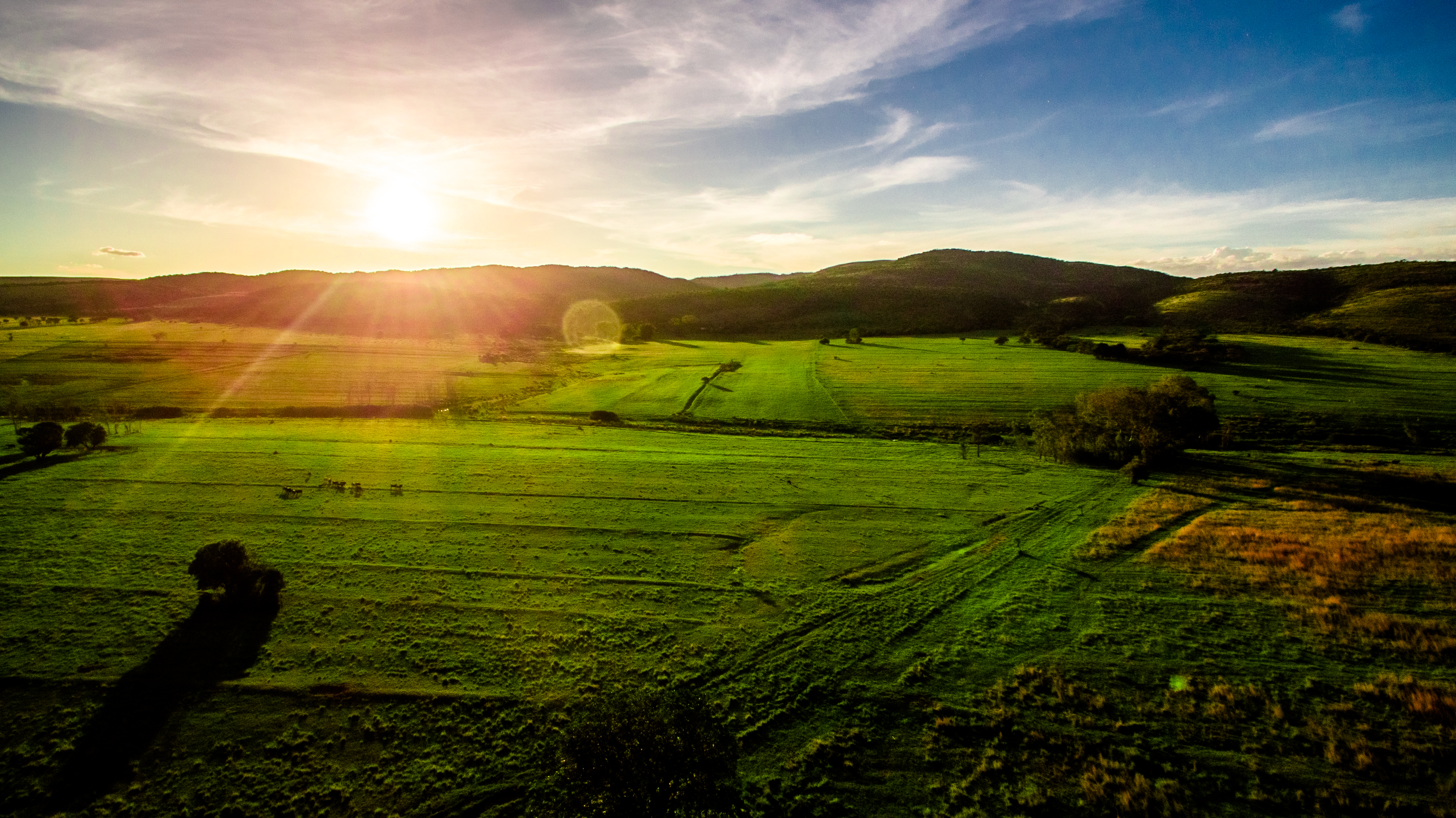
Sundown over one of the mountain ranges found in Limpopo.

Limpopo Province shares international borders with districts and provinces of three countries: Botswana's Central and Kgatleng districts to the west and northwest respectively, Zimbabwe's Matabeleland South and Masvingo provinces to the north and northeast respectively, and Mozambique's Gaza Province to the east. On its southern edge, from east to west, it shares borders with the South African provinces of Mpumalanga, Gauteng, and North West. Its border with Gauteng includes that province's Johannesburg-Pretoria axis, the most industrialised metropolis on the continent.

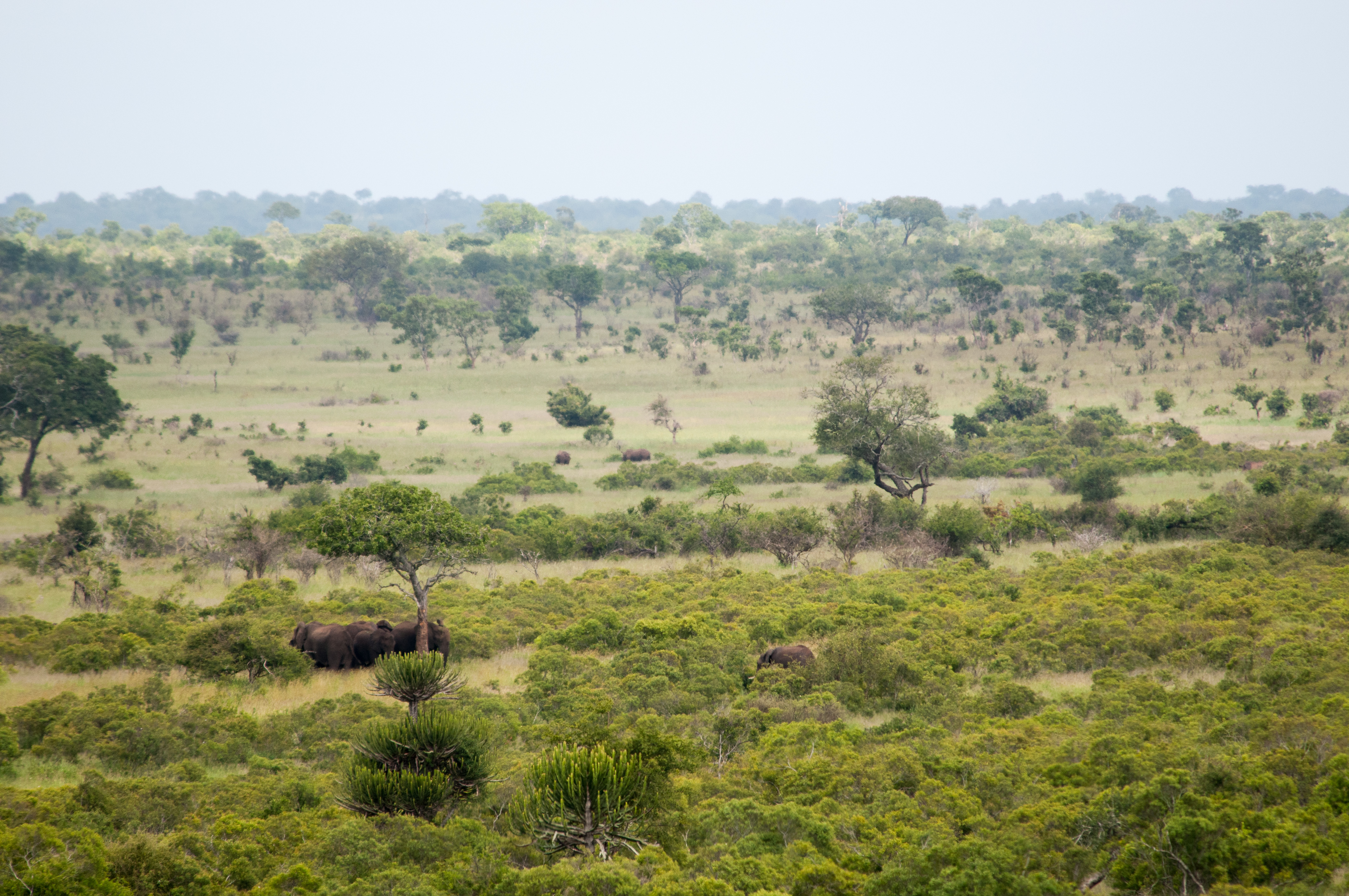
Lowveld landscape

Limpopo contains much of the Waterberg Biosphere, a massif of approximately 15,000 km^{2} (5,800 sq mi) which is the first region in the northern part of South Africa to be named a UNESCO Biosphere Reserve.

The northern portion of the most well-known game reserve in South Africa, the Kruger National Park, is located in the province. This includes famous gates like Pafuri and Punda Maria. This area is renowned for its distinctive landscapes which include a greater density of Baobab trees and fever tree forests alongside the Levubu River. It is an important component of the greater Great Limpopo Transfrontier Park, a vast conservation area that connects Zimbabwean and Mozambican national parks with Kruger.

The far northern region is home to the Soutpansberg mountain range. A sizeable natural salt pan at its western end is the source of its name which translates to "Salt Pan Mountain" in Afrikaans. The range, which stretches roughly 107 kilometres (66 mi) from east to west, is a prominent feature of the area. In addition to being home to many plant and animal species that are unique to Earth, it is a recognised hotspot for biodiversity (Vhembe Biosphere Reserve) and has great cultural significance.

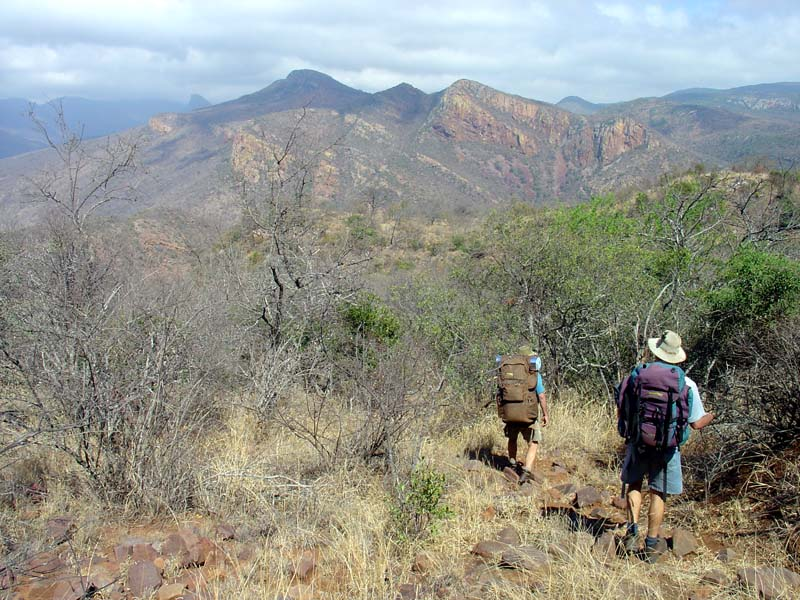
Soutpansberg

The Magoebaskloof is a mountain pass that is accessible by the R71 road between Tzaneen and Haenertsburg. It literally translates to "Makgoba's ravine" and is named after Chief Makgoba.

It is a naturally evergreen subtropical forest that covers a verdant mountainous region. Before being conquered by Afrikaners, the small Kingdom of Makgoba existed in this region. The Debengeni (Dibekeni) waterfalls, Magoebaskloofdam, and numerous forest hiking trails are just a few of the natural occurrences that make Magoebaskloof a popular tourist destination today.

== Law and government ==
The current Premier of Limpopo Province is Phophi Ramathuba, representing the African National Congress.

== Municipalities ==
Limpopo districts and local municipalities

Limpopo Province is divided into five district municipalities. The district municipalities are in turn divided into 25 local municipalities:

=== District municipalities ===
- Capricorn District
  - Blouberg
  - Lepele-Nkumpi
  - Molemole
  - Polokwane
- Mopani District
  - Ba-Phalaborwa
  - Greater Giyani
  - Greater Letaba
  - Greater Tzaneen
  - Maruleng
- Sekhukhune District
  - Elias Motsoaledi
  - Ephraim Mogale
  - Fetakgomo Tubatse
  - Makhuduthamaga
- Vhembe District
  - Makhado
  - Musina
  - Collins Chabane
  - Thulamela
- Waterberg District
  - Bela-Bela
  - Lephalale
  - Modimolle–Mookgophong
  - Mogalakwena
  - Thabazimbi

== Economy ==
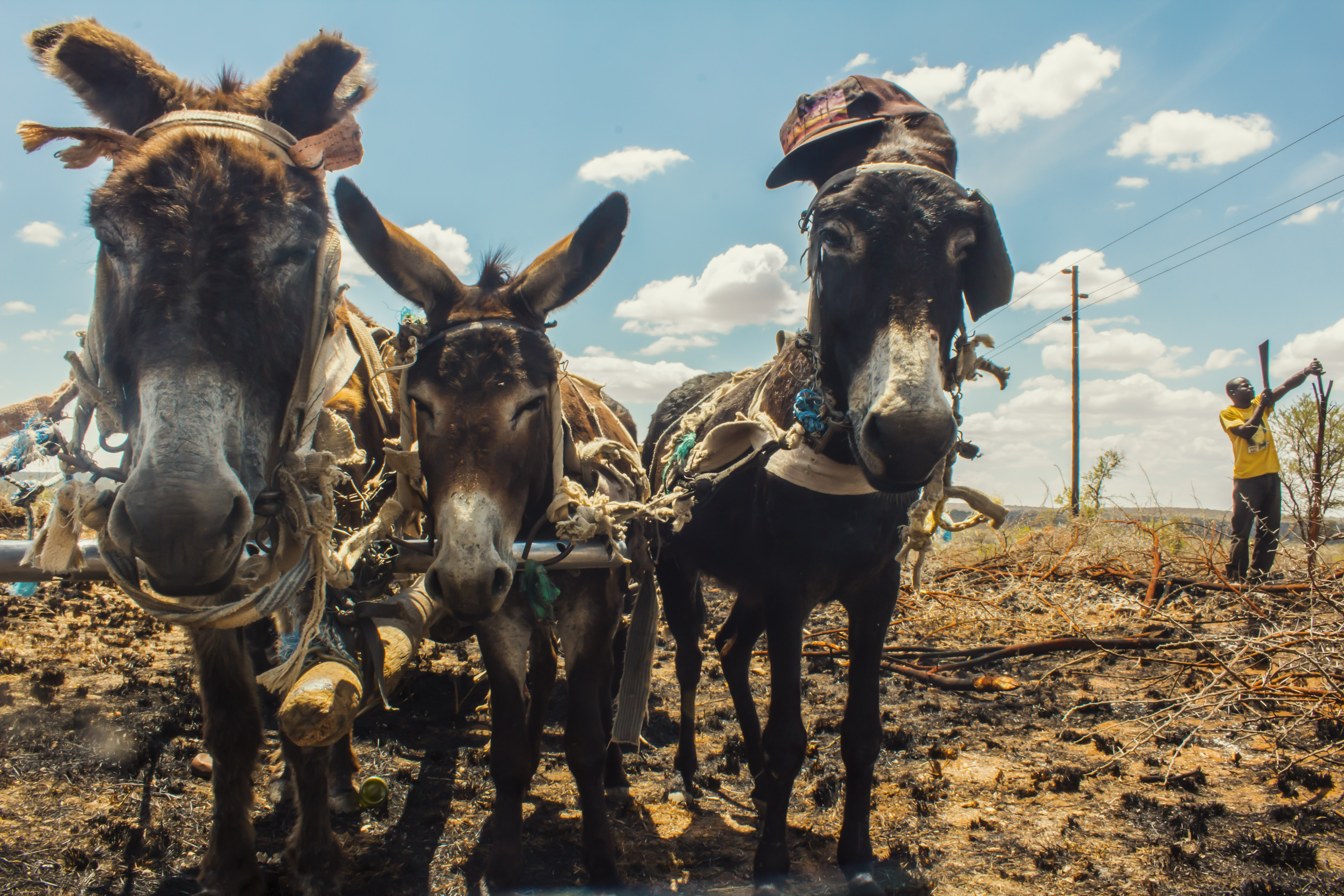
Man and his donkeys collecting wood in a rural area

Limpopo has a total population of 6.015 million with 1.641 million households. The province has a relatively high Human Development Index (HDI) of 0.710, which is the third highest in South Africa.

=== Agriculture ===
The bushveld is beef cattle country, where extensive ranching operations are often supplemented by controlled hunting. About 80% of South Africa's game hunting industry is in Limpopo.

Sunflowers, cotton, maize and peanuts are cultivated in the Bela-Bela and Modimolle areas. Modimolle is also known for its table grapes. An embryotic wine industry is growing in Limpopo. Tropical fruit, such as bananas, litchis, pineapples, mangoes and pawpaws, as well as a variety of nuts, are grown in the Tzaneen and Louis Trichardt areas. Tzaneen is also at the centre of extensive citrus, tea, and coffee plantations and a major forestry industry. Most of the farmers and households lack a water supply which makes them drill boreholes on their premises.

=== Housing ===
Most Limpopo residents live in rural areas; this has led to a new phenomenon of rural development, where the residents have invested in building lavish homes on their tribal land. Limpopo rural houses have been profiled by TV channels, lifestyle vloggers, social media influencers, and Africa's biggest facts brand, Africa Facts Zone. According to 96.2% of Limpopo live in formal housing, above the national average of 84.0%. This makes Limpopo the province with the highest percentage of people living in formal housing in South Africa.

=== Mining ===
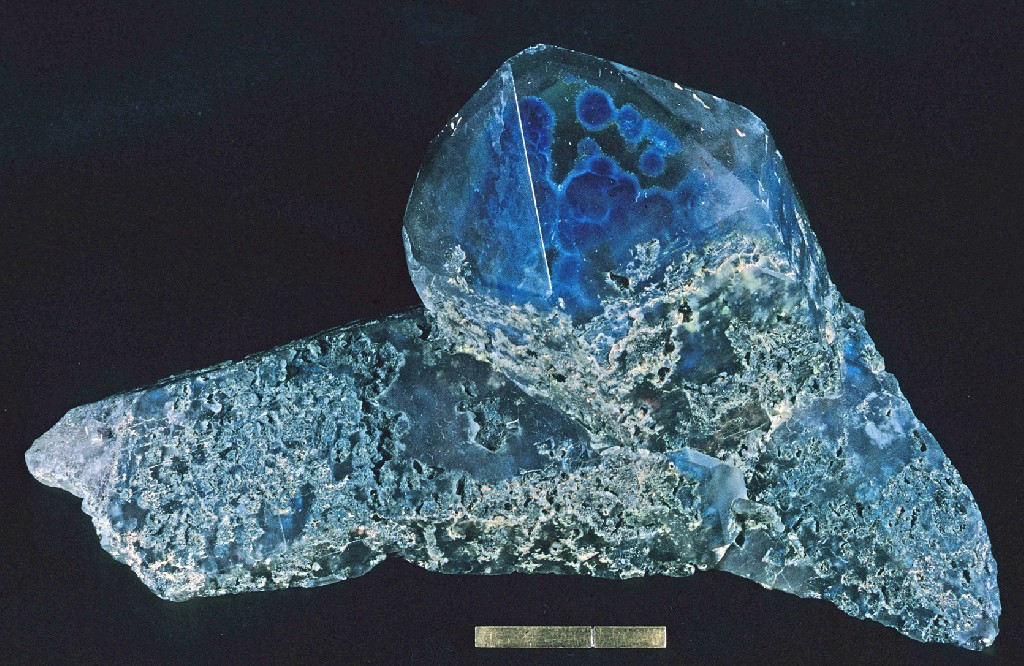
Ajoite in quartz, from the Messina mine, Limpopo Province, South Africa. Scale at bottom is one inch, with a rule at one cm.

Limpopo's rich mineral deposits include the platinum group metals, iron ore, chromium, high- and middle-grade coking coal, diamonds, antimony, phosphate, and copper, as well as mineral reserves like gold, emeralds, scheelite, magnetite, vermiculite, silicon, and mica. Commodities such as black granite, corundum, and feldspar are also found. Mining contributes to over a fifth of the provincial economy.

Limpopo has the largest platinum deposit in South Africa. The Waterberg Coalfield, the eastern extension of Botswana's Mmamabula coalfields, is estimated to contain 40% of South Africa's coal reserves.

=== Tourism ===
The Limpopo Department of Economic Development, Environment and Tourism has targeted the province as a preferred eco-tourism destination. Its Environment and Tourism Programme encompasses tourism, protected areas, and community environment development to achieve sustainable economic growth.

While Limpopo is one of South Africa's poorest provinces, it is rich in wildlife, which gives it an advantage in attracting tourists. Both the private and public sectors are investing in tourism development.

Near Modjadjiskloof, at Sunland Baobab farms, there is a large Baobab tree which has been fashioned into a relatively spacious pub.

== Transportation and communications ==
The province has excellent road, rail, and air links. The N1 route from Johannesburg, which extends the length of the province, is the busiest overland route in Africa in terms of cross-border trade in raw materials and beneficiated goods. The port of Durban, South Africa's busiest, is served directly by the province, as are the ports of Richards Bay and Maputo. Polokwane International Airport is situated just north of Polokwane. Limpopo province contains approximately 56 airports and airstrips.

== Education ==
The Department of Education is responsible for effecting quality education and training for all. The department has to coordinate all professional development and support. Policies, systems, and procedures had to be developed.

=== Educational institutions ===
As of December 2020, 12.9% of the Limpopo population had attained some post-school qualifications. The following higher education institutions are found in Limpopo:

- University of Limpopo (Polokwane, Mankweng)
- University of Venda (Thohoyandou)
- Tshwane University of Technology (Polokwane Campus)
- Capricorn College for TVET (Polokwane)
- Lephalale TVET College (Lephalale)
- Letaba TVET College (Tzaneen)
- Mopani South East TVET College (Phalaborwa)
- Sekhukhune TVET College (Motetema)
- Vhembe TVET College (Venda)
- Waterberg TVET College (Mokopane)

== Sports ==
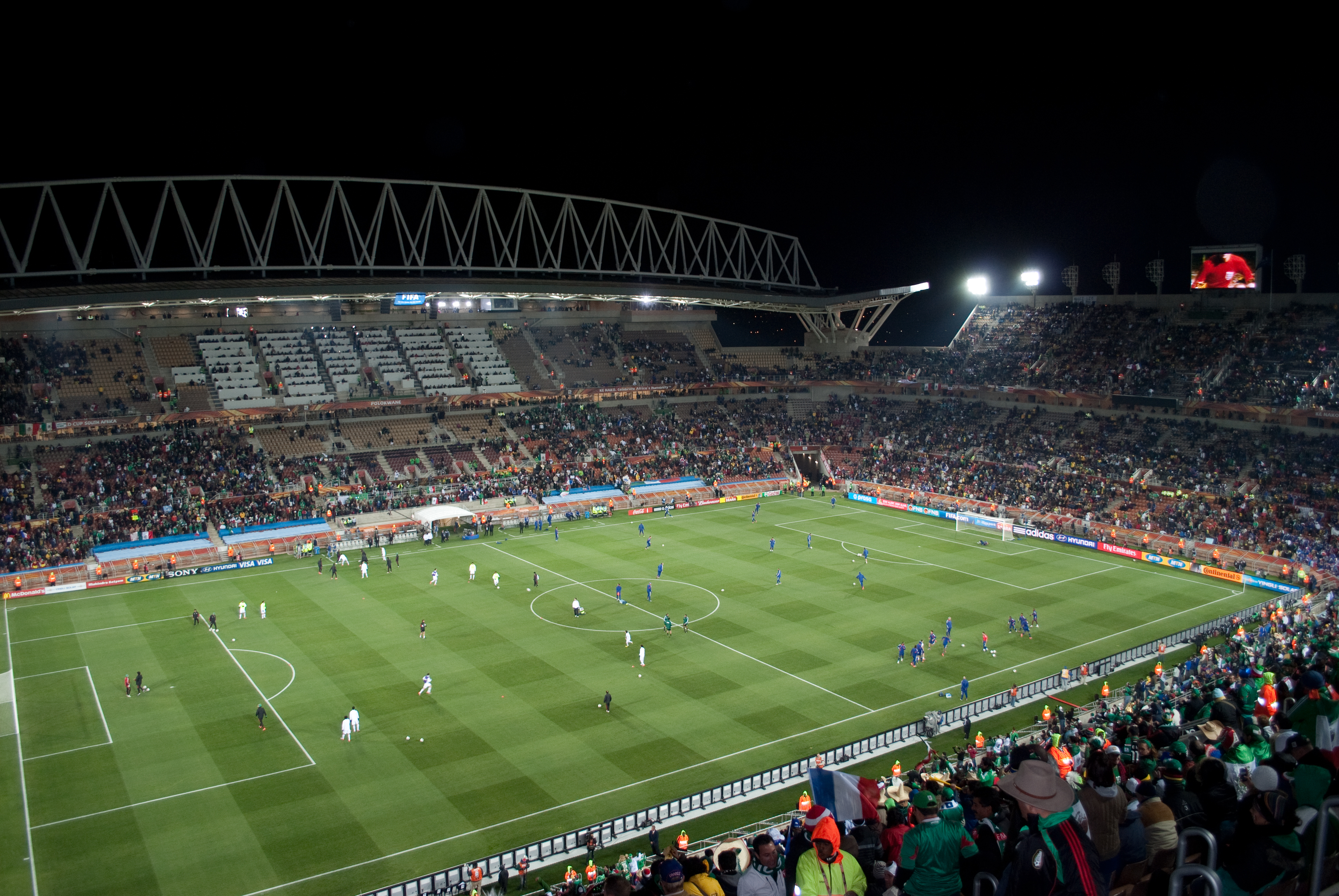
Peter Mokaba Stadium in Polokwane

- Association football: Polokwane was one of South Africa's host cities for the 2010 FIFA World Cup, with matches being played at the Peter Mokaba Stadium. Football clubs in the province include Real Rovers, Silver Stars, Black Leopards, Polokwane City, Magesi, Baroka, Ria Stars and Dynamos.
- Rugby union: Limpopo has no provincial rugby team of its own; it is represented in the domestic Currie Cup by the Pretoria-based Blue Bulls. The Blue Bulls also operate a Super Rugby franchise, the Bulls. Limpopo nonetheless produces its share of top players. Most notably, the second most-capped forward in the history of the country's national team, Victor Matfield, is a native of Polokwane.
- Basketball: The province is home to Limpopo Pride, a professional team that plays in South Africa's top basketball division, the Basketball National League.

== Demographics ==
Population density in Limpopo: < 1 /km²; 1–3 /km²; 3–10 /km²; 10–30 /km²; 30–100 /km²; 100–300 /km²; 300–1000 /km²; 1000–3000 /km²; > 3000 /km²

Dominant home languages in Limpopo: Afrikaans; English; Pedi; Swati; Tsonga; Tswana; Venda; No language dominant

The population of Limpopo consists of several ethnic groups distinguished by culture, language, and race. 97.3% of the population is Black, 2.4% is White, 0.2% is Coloured, and 0.1% is Indian/Asian. The province has the smallest percentage and second smallest total number of White South Africans in the country. However, there are several localities with a White majority, notably Hoedspruit and Modimolle. It also has the highest Black percentage out of all the provinces.

The Pedi comprise the largest percentage of the population, 52% of the province. The Tsonga people comprise about 24.0% of the province; the Tsonga also comprise about 11.5% of Mpumalanga province since the southern part of their homeland, Gazankulu, was cut off from Limpopo and allocated to Mpumalanga. The Venda make up about 16.7%. Afrikaners make up the majority of Limpopo's White population, about 95,000 people; English-speaking Whites number just over 20,000. Vhembe district has the smallest share of White people in Limpopo, about 5,000 total. In contrast, the Waterberg district has the largest share of Whites, with more than 60,000 Whites residing there. Coloureds and Asians/Indians make up a tiny percentage of the province's total population.

=== HIV/AIDS ===
At 18.5% (2007), Limpopo has a relatively high incidence of HIV compared to other South African provinces. Cases rose from 14.5% to 21.5% between 2001 and 2005, with a slight fall between 2005 and 2007. However, as at 2019, the Limpopo province HIV stats sat at (13.2%) which is one of the lowest in comparison with other provinces in South Africa.

== See also ==
- List of cities and towns in Limpopo
- Limpopo River
- Xibelani dance
- Zoutpansberg division
