= Nkakareng Rakgoale =

South African politician (born 1976)

Nkakareng Rakgoale MPL

Member of the Limpopo Executive Council for Public Works, Roads and Infrastructure
- In office 29 June 2022 – 14 June 2024
- Premier: Stanley Mathabatha
- Preceded by: Dickson Masemola
- Succeeded by: Sebataolo Rachoene

Member of the Limpopo Executive Council for Social Development
- In office 22 May 2019 – 29 June 2022
- Premier: Stanley Mathabatha
- Preceded by: Mapula Mokaba-Phukwana
- Succeeded by: Dickson Masemola

Member of the Limpopo Provincial Legislature
- Incumbent
- Assumed office 22 May 2019

Personal details
- Born: Chritian Nkakareng Rakgoale; 13 October 1976 (age 49) Balloon, Limpopo
- Party: African National Congress
- Education: University of Venda (BA)

Chritian Nkakareng Rakgoale (born 13 October 1976) is a South African politician. From June 2022 until June 2024, she served as the Member of the Executive Council (MEC) for Public Works, Roads and Infrastructure in the Limpopo provincial government. She previously served as the MEC for Social Development from May 2019 to June 2022. Rakgoale was elected to the Limpopo Provincial Legislature in May 2019. Before that, she served as the Executive Mayor of the Mopani District Municipality. Rakgoale is a member of the African National Congress.

== Early life and education ==
Rakgoale was born in the village of Balloon in the apartheid-era Lebowa bantustan, now situated in the Limpopo province of South Africa. She attended Balloon Mantjana School and matriculated from Maalobane High School. Rakgoale went on to study at the University of Venda and graduated with a Bachelor of Arts before going on to study through the University of South Africa, obtaining a certificate in human resources. Thereafter, she earned a certificate in Monitoring and Evaluation from Stellenbosch University.

While a student at the University of Venda, Rakgoale got involved in politics. She was a member of the South African Student Congress, and served as the chairperson of the SASCO branch at the university. Rakgoale gradually ascended through the leadership ranks of the student movement, leading to her election as the deputy provincial chairperson of SASCO in Limpopo in 2001.

== Early government career ==
After university, Rakgoale found work at the then provincial Department of Local Government and Housing as a community development worker. She later worked as a Local Economic Development Officer at the Maruleng Local Municipality before she joined the provincial government as a manager of the Community Development Workers Programme in the office of the Premier.

== ANC leadership positions ==
Rakgoale was branch secretary of the Bahloca ANC Branch, branch secretary of the Mokaba ANC Branch, and the erstwhile chairperson of the Sydney Seleka ANC Branch. She served on both the ANC and ANC Youth League Regional Executive Committees in the Mopani region, serving as treasurer of both structures simultaneously. As of 2018, Rakgoale serves on the Provincial Executive Committee and the Provincial Working Committee of the ANC in Limpopo.

== Mayor of the Mopani District ==
On 30 June 2014, the ANC named Rakgoale as the successor to the ousted Executive Mayor of the Mopani District Municipality, Joshua Matlou, who was recalled over allegations of factionalism. Rakgoale was elected mayor during a council meeting on 29 July 2014 after which she was sworn in. She was re-elected as district mayor in the aftermath of the 2016 municipal elections.

In January 2019, Rakgoale came under scrutiny after a voice recording was released in which she promised ANC branch members in the Mopani region jobs in exchange for their votes and told them not to sell their votes at the provincial list conference held at Bolivia Lodge in Polokwane the previous month. Rakgoale later had to explain her comments to the ANC Provincial Executive Committee while the provincial South African National Civics Organisation called for her to be removed as district mayor.

== Limpopo provincial government ==
In the 2019 general election, Rakgoale was elected to the Limpopo Provincial Legislature as an ANC representative, having been ranked 6th on the party's list. She resigned as mayor of Mopani to take up her seat in the provincial legislature. Following her swearing-in as a member of the provincial legislature, she was appointed a Member of the Executive Council (MEC) in the newly constituted executive council of re-elected Limpopo premier Stanley Mathabatha; her portfolio was Social Development.

Following the ANC's 10th provincial elective conference held in June 2022, re-elected party provincial chairman Mathabatha reshuffled his executive council on 29 June which saw re-elected provincial executive committee additional member Rakgoale swap positions with Mathabatha's unsuccessful challenger for provincial chairperson and the MEC for Public Works, Roads and Infrastructure, Dr Dickson Masemola. In August 2022, Rakgoale oversaw the launch of provincial leg of national pothole patching programme named "Operation Thiba Mekoti Ditseleng".

Following the 2024 general election, she was replaced with Sebataolo Rachoene as MEC for Public Works, Roads and Infrastructure.
