= Namakgale =

- Location within Limpopo Location within South Africa
- Coordinates: 23.938°S 31.028°E
- Country: South Africa
- Province: Limpopo
- District: Mopani
- Municipality: Ba-Phalaborwa
- Established: 1959
  - Councillor: (African National Congress)

Area
  - Total: 12.97 km^{2} (5.01 sq mi)

Population (2011)
  - Total: 36,365
  - Density: 2,804/km^{2} (7,262/sq mi)

Racial makeup (2011)
  - Black African: 99.6%
  - Coloured: 0.1%
  - Indian/Asian: 0.1%
  - White: 0.1%

First languages (2011)
  - Northern Sotho: 65.5%
  - Tsonga: 23.3%
  - Sotho: 3.8%
  - Zulu Venda) = 7%: 2.0%
  - Other: 5.3%
- Time zone: UTC+2 (SAST)
- Postal code (street): 1391
- PO box: 1391
- Area code: 015

Namakgale is a large township lying 12 km outside Phalaborwa in Mopani District in the Limpopo province of South Africa. Its nearest neighbouring townships are Lulekani, Makhushane, Maseke and Mashishimale on the R71 road to Gravelotte (GaMaenetje). It is next to the Kruger National Park on the north eastern part of the Limpopo province previously Northern Transvaal.

The township enjoys the annual marula festival during February and March, when the ripe marula fruit harvest is at its peak, and the marula traditional beer is brewed. This is where the Amarula liqueur is made, and the pulp is shipped to Cape Town for further processing. The citizens of Namakgale enjoy the Mopani worms first harvest during March and April, and the second harvest in December. The Mopani tree and the Morula tree are important to the residents of the Namakgale as they bring important community subsistence farming.

== Schools ==
=== Colleges ===
- Acohill Nursery & College/School (Capital 5: Private, Portraits & Day Care Training)
- Mopani TVET College (TVET: Technical and Vocational Education and Training)

=== High schools ===
- Relebogile High School
- Vuxeni High School
- Sebalamakgolo High School
- Maphokwane High School
- Lebeko High School
- Lepato M.High School
- Makikele High School
- Matome Malatji

=== Primary schools ===
- Gaza Primary School
- Kgopsane Primary School
- Mhala Mhala Primary School
- Namakgale Primary School
- Phalaborwa Primary School
- Refentse Primary School
- Refilwe Primary School
- Rethabile Primary School
- Rethusitswe Primary School
- Stanbury Higher Primary School
- Madjadji Primary School
- Mashishimale Primary School
- Mabine Primary School
- Mathibela Primary School

== Demographics ==
Namakgale is largely inhabited by migrant labourers and their descendants. Most of this migrant labourers originate from the Bolobedu area, Tzaneen, Ga-Sekororo and Bushbuckridge. Most of the people in Namakgale are employed in mining, namely Palabora Mining Company, Sasol Agri and FOSKOR.

The majority of the residence of Namakgale speak Northern Sotho language, with the Sepulana, KhePhalaborwa and KheLobedu dialects being the most predominantly spoken forms, is the first language of about 70% of the people. The N'walungu variety of Xitsonga is the second most spoken language after Northern Sotho; XiTsonga is the first language of about 30% of the people.

The residents of the neighbouring villages of Ga-Makhushane, Ga-Mashishimale, Ga-Maseke and Ga-Selwane are called Ba-Phalaborwa ba ga Malatji, a North Sotho tribe of Kalanga extraction. The Malatji royal family venerates the totem of the Noko, a porcupine. The clan is generally called Dinoko as a symbol of respect.

== Sports facilities ==
- Namakgale Stadium
- Phosphate Club Stadium

== Notable people ==
- Pule Mabe, ANC national spokesperson
- Sipho Mashele, cricketer
- Seaparo Charles Sekoati, member of the National Assembly of South Africa
