= Lobedu queendom =

Matriarchal state in South Africa

- Status: State from c. 18th century–1894 Currently a non-sovereign monarchy within South Africa
- Capital: Khetlhakone (current)
- Common languages: Northern Sotho (Lobedu dialect)
- Government: Monarchy
- Modjadji
Preceded by
Rozvi Empire; Venda Kingdom

The Lobedu queendom was a precolonial state belonging to the Lobedu people in northeastern modern-day South Africa, controlling the territory between the Great and Little Letaba rivers. The state was headed by the Rain Queen, who was renowned for her rainmaking powers; in the present day the position constitutes a non-sovereign monarchy within South Africa.

== History ==
=== Origins ===
Historians consider the Lobedu to have originated in the Rozvi Empire in modern-day Zimbabwe (whose founder was an official in Mutapa), and to have migrated south around the late-17th century with the Singo (Venda) and Lemba due to "political dissension". They are thought to have settled near Dzata in the Soutpansberg for some time (supported by Venda traditions), before splitting from the Venda in the 18th century.

Lobedu traditions periodise history into two cycles: the first where they are ruled by kings, purportedly beginning pre-1600 and ending c. 1800, after which they are ruled by queens. Traditions hold that the nuclear Lobedu ('Lobedu proper' or royal Lobedu) descend from the rulers of the Mutapa and Rozvi empires. Versions recorded by Annekie Joubert between 1995 and 2001, and those by Eileen and Jacob Krige in Realm of a Rain Queen (1943), narrate a succession dispute between the sons of a Mutapa ruler, resulting in the empire being divided up between them, with one son building his capital at a mountain called "Maulwi" where his subjects prostrated themselves and called him "murozvi". They further say that a Karanga (Shona) ruler's daughter called "Dzugudini" (from incest) migrated southwards across the Limpopo with her son "Makaphimo" and a small group, carrying rainmaking medicines and sacral glass beads, to settle below the Drakensberg in the "Daja forest" near the Molototsi River. Another version recorded in 1938 by Albert Mathegka said that the Lobedu left modern-day Zimbabwe amid a succession dispute between the sons of Mambo; led by "Makaphele" and accompanied by his mother and rain calabash, they crossed the Limpopo and Mooketsi–Mosukudutswe confluence to settle at "Kgumelong" on a mountain. Ferdinand Kruger recorded a version in 1936 that said that a Lobedu king in modern-day Zimbabwe had two sons, the younger of which, "Magaphele", was given rainmaking abilities; accordingly the older son attacked him out of jealousy and Magaphele fled across the Limpopo to settle at "Khumelo".

Joubert's and the Kriges' versions say that after Makaphimo's death, "Muhale" came to rule at "Khumeloni" and is regarded as the founder of the Lobedu. Accordingly, Muhale subjugated a local tau (lion totem) group called "Khioga" (also "Kheoka" or "Seoka"; Kruger's version said this was done by Magaphele). David Beach wrote that archaeological research is lacking on whether there were Ngano groups (a term for pre-Singo groups in Soutpansberg) in Lobedu territory. Joubert's and the Kriges' versions portray the Khioga as primitive, and say that the Lobedu taught them how to cook food with fire and use hoes. Joubert's, the Kriges', and Mathegka's versions say that the Lobedu sought to take over the territory, and that they set fire to the forest to drive away the Khioga, killing most of them in the process. The Kriges' version said that Muhale was buried in the Daja forest, after which the Lobedu ceased fearing the ancestral spirits of the Khioga.

=== Era of kings ===
Joubert's and the Kriges' versions say that Muhale was succeeded by his son "Malaji", who reportedly had a peaceful and prosperous reign. Accordingly, his death caused a succession conflict between two sons. The Kriges' and Kruger's versions said that the older son, "Madaji"/"Madaze", drove away the younger son, "Makhoba"/"Phedole" (some versions say the latter name was earned later), who fled to a settlement at "Khebela"/"Khevela"/"Khivela" mountain (located near the Olifants–Selati confluence and c. 1740 according to Jacob Krige). Kruger's and the Kriges' versions say that Madaji/Madaze struggled to make rain, causing drought and famine, while Makhoba at Khevela received plenty of rain. Accordingly he was invited back to rule, and both versions say he returned to rule the Lobedu, some saying that he took on his father's/ancestor's name "Phedole"/"Phedola" (from which Krige wrote that a mountain near his old settlement derived its name). Phedole reportedly bore a praise name which translated as "Transformer of the Clouds".

According to tradition, at some point the people moved from the Daja forest to "Lebyene" (with Zimbabwe-esque stonewalling) at a mountain summit. The Kriges' version said that "Khiale" succeeded Phedole, and that it was during his reign that Sotho groups invaded the lowveld, however Joubert's versions make no mention of Khiale. The Kriges' versions say that Khiale had taught his youngest son, "Mogodu", how to use rain charms, ensuring Mogodu's succession, though Joubert's versions say this was done by Phedole. Mogodu was reportedly paranoid and believed himself "supernaturally guided", making spurious accusations against councillors and ordering the execution of his detractors. After an elder brother revolted, Mogodu reportedly drove him and his followers away. Mogodu also failed to intervene in conflict between two of his headmen, only doing so in objection to "rusty arrows fit for a rubbish heap", after which he entered into a dance (hu pebela) and made the following prophecy:

I am going away to creep into the horn of a cow [i.e. die]. I do not like to sleep in the open, vainly counting the stars. I go to unloose the black ants in the east [referring to the Mfecane]. They will bite you and kill you, but in the end you will overcome them. Thereafter I shall unleash the red ants in the west [i.e. Europeans]; you will fight them, but you will fight them in vain. Further, I say this country will be ruled by a frontal skirt [i.e. a woman].

=== Onset of the era of queens, the Mfecane, and Boer annexation ===
According to the Kriges' version, following Mogodu's reign there ensues vicious civil war between his sons, accompanied by severe famine. "Malegudu" ("Mmalekutu" in Mathegka's version) reportedly seizes control for some time but is driven away by his sister, Modjadji I, who comes to rule c. 1800. Kruger's version differs and has Mogodu expelling two quarrelling sons and giving the kingship to his daughter, Modjadji. Modjadji I, the daughter of an incestuous relationship between Mogodu and his own daughter, reportedly lived in ritual seclusion and earned her reputation as a skilled rainmaker. According to tradition she reigned from c. 1800 to c. 1845 or 1850, during which many foreigners visited her with gifts to ask for her help, including representatives of Soshangane, Zwide, Moshoeshoe, and Sekwati during the Mfecane. The queen did not rely on a military to maintain the state, instead leveraging her widely-renowned ritual power (such that groups avoided attacking her due to fear of drought and famine) and marriage ties to other groups, with her location in the mountains also serving a defensive purpose.

According to tradition, Modjadji II succeeded her mother and reigned from c. 1845 or 1850 to 1894, during which the Lobedu experienced European encroachment for the first time. In 1855 the Transvaal Republic (ZAR) expanded to nominally include Lobedu territory, and an annual hut tax of one goat, one sheep, and five pigs was imposed on the Lobedu, with João Albasini tasked with collection. Modjadji refused to pay this tax/tribute, causing Albasini to report her to the central ZAR government, which gave him license to act as he wished, leading him to attack the Lobedu capital and seize cattle and 400 children. In the following decades, a per capita tax of 10 shillings was introduced alongside a hut tax also of 10 shillings, set to be collected by local chiefs who were divided into individual "locations". In 1881 Modjadji permitted a Christian mission station to be founded at Medingen after missionaries won favour by providing small services; the denigration of traditional customs (especially rainmaking) by the missionaries and a converted chief greatly angered the people, and a drought between 1881 and 1882 was believed to be punishment from the ancestors. In 1886 the ZAR legislated that they could forcibly settle White farmers on 'native' land, provoking the Lobedu to burn down White-owned farmhouses and raid their cattle. In 1889, a new Bantu Commissioner was appointed who demanded annual tax of £1000 (compared to the £40 or £50 hut tax Albasini had collected annually), greatly angering Modjadji. She planned to attack the mission station in Medingen and Shangaan allies of the ZAR, but in October 1890 the Commissioner responded by destroying the Lobedu capital, burning down huts and raiding cattle.

Between 1890 and 1894, a severe drought hit the region which was blamed on White missionaries, raising tensions between them and the Lobedu, and in 1892, at the request of local settlers, the ZAR delineated Modjadji's 'location' at 17,500 morgen (44 km² or 17 sq mi), reduced from the 600 sq mi (1,600 km^{2}) she was accustomed to ruling over. Modjadji's strong opposition saw her make many alliances with other rulers in the Soutpansberg. In 1894 the ZAR declared war on the 'rebellious' Hananwa, a group in Blouberg aggrieved by land dispossession, and the Lobedu. After conquering the Hananwa, the ZAR invaded Modjadji's 'location'; unable to mount an effective defence, she and 80 of her headmen surrendered. Hundreds of huts were burnt down and around 10,000 cattle were seized. Modjadji was ordered to receive and cooperate with Whites visiting her, and to not resist the spread of Christianity among the Lobedu. With her capital destroyed, land dispossessed, and authority curtailed, on returning to her royal kraal in September 1894 Modjadji II committed ritual suicide.

=== Colonial and postcolonial periods ===
A scourge of rinderpest hit the region in 1896, quickly followed by a drought which provoked outmigration. The famine in 1897 is estimated to have caused the deaths of around a third of the Lobedu population. The leading missionary, Fritz Reuter, solicited support from the ZAR and Germany in an attempt to alleviate some of the suffering, and in 1896 he brought 65 Lobedus to Berlin for a human exhibition. The return of the 65 Lobedus (dubbed 'Berliners') saw a rise in the spread of Christianity, and the flourishing of the mission station at Medingen. Modjadji III ordered children in her kraal to go to school, and she allowed Christians into the meeting place and for a church to be built near her kraal. According to Patricia Davison, in the aftermath of the Second Boer War many Africans resettled land that had been seized. Lobedu territory remained largely free from White settlement due to its relative isolation and malaria, and the economy remained localised and based in subsistence agriculture, but this changed in the 1950s with the eradication of malaria and the construction of new infrastructure. The growing opportunities and subsequent influx of migrants reduced agricultural land, and the economy gradually monetised. Traditional roles of authority were greatly weakened by the Bantu Authorities Act of 1951, and in 1959 Modjadji III died and was succeeded by Modjadji IV, who was installed by the Minister of Bantu Administration and Development. In 1972 Lobedu territory became part of the Northern Sotho bantustan of Lebowa. These developments transformed Lobedu society, and by the late 1970s over 65% of men had left to seek work elsewhere. Modjadji IV's marriage to a commoner damaged the monarchy's ritual authority, and meant that her children were not of 'pure royal blood'. She died in 1980 and was succeeded by her daughter, Modjadji V.

Modjadji VI succeeded her mother in 2003. Contrary to tradition, she lived a public life, wore Western clothing and had a Western education, and chose to marry a commoner; after her death in 2005 at the age of 26, a succession dispute ensued, as the male-dominated royal council viewed her daughter, Masalanabo Modjadji, as poorly-suited due to her upbringing and her father being a commoner. In 2021, the regent opposed her ascension, and instead appointed Prince Lekukela Modjadji as king-elect, who argued that the rainmaking position was not limited to women because of the 'era of kings'. The decision received strong criticism, and in 2023 the royal council endorsed Masalanabo as queen, and she received legal recognition from the South African government in 2024.

== Government ==
The Lobedu political system consisted of several checks and balances to the monarchy, situated within a complex system of kinship and marriage. Succession to the queenship was hereditary, and went to the queen's eldest daughter. Rulers traditionally committed ritual suicide at the end of their reign. The state controlled the territory between the Great and Little Letaba rivers, and in the late-19th century covered 600 sq mi (1,600 km^{2}).

The queen built ties between the nuclear/royal Lobedu and the wider population by requiring every headman to send a daughter to be one of her wives. The wives were then to have a child with a close relative of the queen, and the children were considered her own and to belong to the royal lineage (because Lobedu society was patrilineal and the queen played the role of the husband in these cases). Some headmen's daughters were given in marriage to other important subjects of the queen, building ties that benefited both the queen and the headmen.

== Culture and society ==
Despite the state being ruled by women, its society was and is organised patriarchally, such that people 'belong' to and inherit from their patrilineal line, and marriage is patrilocal. Women that were unable to have children were treated as men, and were able to inherit cattle, receive bridewealth, and exert significant influence.

== List of rulers ==
=== Era of kings ===
The following regnal lists are based on five sources that recorded versions of Lobedu tradition (Annekie Joubert summarised traditions narrated to her between 1995 and 2001):

Joubert (2004)	Krige (1975 and 1985)	The Kriges (1943)	Kruger (1936)	Mathegka (1938)
Makaphimo (son of Dzuguduni)	Makaphimo (son of Dzuguduni)	Makaphimo (son of Dzuguduni)	Magaphele	Makaphele/Phetole (son of Tsukutleng)
Muhale	Mohale	Muhale	Mohale	Mohale
Malaji	Maladji	Malaji	Kheale kha Mmamohale Ledaza	Mokoto (last)
Pheduli (defeated his brother Madaji)	Phedule/Makhoba	Madaji	Phedola-Khefhedola-Maru-a-daza	Mmalekutu
Mogodu	Khiale	Pheduli (brother of Madaji)	Madaze	
	Mogodo	Khiali	Makhoba (brother of Madaze)	
		Mogodo	Mogodo	
		Malegudu		

=== Era of queens ===
The following regnal list (including the dates) is based on the traditions recorded by Joubert:

Ruler	Reign	Notes
Modjadji I	c. 1800 – c. 1845	The Kriges' version had her reign ending c. 1850
Modjadji II	c. 1845–1894	
Modjadji III	1896–1959	
Modjadji IV	1960–1980	
Modjadji V	1982–2001	
Modjadji VI	2003–2005	
Interregnum		
Modjadji VII	2023–present (as of 2026)	
