= Lulekani =

- Location within Limpopo Location within South Africa
- Coordinates: 23.835°S 30.978°E
- Country: South Africa
- Province: Limpopo
- District: Mopani
- Municipality: Ba-Phalaborwa
- Established: 1979

Area
  - Total: 6.61 km^{2} (2.55 sq mi)

Population (2011)
  - Total: 14,464
  - Density: 2,190/km^{2} (5,670/sq mi)

Racial makeup (2011)
  - Black African: 99.4%
  - Coloured: 0.1%
  - Indian/Asian: 0.2%
  - White: 0.2%
  - Other: 0.1%

First languages (2011)
  - Tsonga: 89.0%
  - Northern Sotho: 2.8%
  - Sotho: 2.5%
  - Swazi: 1.4%
  - Other: 4.3%
- Time zone: UTC+2 (SAST)
- Postal code (street): 1392
- PO box: 1392
- Area code: 015

Lulekani (nicknamed Lukcity) is a township 13 km outside Phalaborwa in Ba-Phalaborwa Municipality in the Limpopo province of South Africa. Lulekani is close to Kruger National Park Border and has two main shopping centers and is also home to a restaurant. There is a Lulekani stadium just few hundred meters from Lulekani Shoprite.

The neighboring townships of Lulekani is Namakgale, Majeje (Benfarm), Makhushwane and Mashishimale on the R71 road to Gravelotte. During the Census of 2011, the population of Lulekani and its neighbouring township Humulani counted 40 225.
