= The Oaks, South Africa =

The Oaks
- Location within Limpopo Location within South Africa
- Coordinates: 24.363°S 30.673°E
- Country: South Africa
- Province: Limpopo
- District: Mopani
- Municipality: Maruleng

Government
  - Type: Ward 03
  - Councillor: Mametja Victor (ANC)

Area
  - Total: 4.06 km^{2} (1.57 sq mi)

Population (2011)
  - Total: 4,068
  - Density: 1,000/km^{2} (2,600/sq mi)

Racial makeup (2011)
  - Black African: 99.6%
  - Coloured: 0.3%

First languages (2011)
  - Northern Sotho: 96.7%
  - Other: 3.3%
- Time zone: UTC+2 (SAST)
- Postal code (street): 1384
- PO box: 1384
- Area code: 015

The Oaks is a small settlement on the northern banks of the Olifants River in the Limpopo province of South Africa. It resorts under the Maruleng Local Municipality in Mopani District Municipality.
