= Metz, South Africa =

Metz
- Location within Limpopo Location within South Africa
- Coordinates: 24.245°S 30.474°E
- Country: South Africa
- Province: Limpopo
- District: Mopani
- Municipality: Maruleng

Area
  - Total: 7.94 km^{2} (3.07 sq mi)

Population (2011)
  - Total: 6,350
  - Density: 800/km^{2} (2,070/sq mi)

Racial makeup (2011)
  - Black African: 99.8%
  - Coloured: 0.1%

First languages (2011)
  - Northern Sotho: 95.7%
  - Tsonga: 1.2%
  - Other: 3.2%
- Time zone: UTC+2 (SAST)

Metz is a town in Mopani District Municipality in the Limpopo province of South Africa.
