= Kanana, Limpopo =

Kanana
- Location within Limpopo Location within South Africa
- Coordinates: 24.208°S 30.422°E
- Country: South Africa
- Province: Limpopo
- District: Mopani
- Municipality: Maruleng

Area
  - Total: 0.63 km^{2} (0.24 sq mi)

Population (2011)
  - Total: 1,201
  - Density: 1,900/km^{2} (4,900/sq mi)

Racial makeup (2011)
  - Black African: 99.4%
  - Coloured: 0.1%
  - Indian/Asian: 0.3%
  - Other: 0.2%

First languages (2011)
  - Northern Sotho: 93.7%
  - Sign language: 2.2%
  - English: 1.4%
  - Other: 2.8%
- Time zone: UTC+2 (SAST)
- Postal code (street): 9944
- PO box: 9944

Kanana is a small settlement in Maruleng Local Municipality under Mopani District Municipality in the Limpopo province of South Africa.
