= Finale, Limpopo =

Finale
- Location within Limpopo Location within South Africa
- Coordinates: 24.327°S 30.707°E
- Country: South Africa
- Province: Limpopo
- District: Mopani
- Municipality: Maruleng

Area
  - Total: 2.33 km^{2} (0.90 sq mi)

Population (2011)
  - Total: 2,793
  - Density: 1,200/km^{2} (3,100/sq mi)

Racial makeup (2011)
  - Black African: 99.9%
  - Coloured: 0.1%

First languages (2011)
  - Northern Sotho: 94.6%
  - Zulu: 1.8%
  - S. Ndebele: 1.4%
  - Other: 2.2%
- Time zone: UTC+2 (SAST)

Finale is a town in Mopani District Municipality in the Limpopo province of South Africa.
