= The Willows, Limpopo =

The Willows village Dingapong
- Location within Limpopo Location within South Africa
- Coordinates: 24.341°S 30.579°E
- Country: South Africa
- Province: Limpopo
- District: Mopani
- Municipality: Maruleng

Area
  - Total: 10.94 km^{2} (4.22 sq mi)

Population (2011)
  - Total: 3,853
  - Density: 352.2/km^{2} (912.2/sq mi)

Racial makeup (2011)
  - Black African: 99.7%
  - Indian/Asian: 0.1%
  - Other: 0.2%

First languages (2011)
  - Northern Sotho: 93.5%
  - Tsonga: 2.9%
  - Other: 3.6%
- Time zone: UTC+2 (SAST)
- Postal code (morupu mmola D21 road Dingapong): 1384/1380
- PO box: 1384/1380

The Willows is a town in Mopani District Municipality in the Limpopo province of South Africa.
