= Skhiming =

- Location within Limpopo Location within South Africa
- Coordinates: 23.433°S 30.562°E
- Country: South Africa
- Province: Limpopo
- District: Mopani
- Municipality: Greater Giyani

Area
  - Total: 1.50 km^{2} (0.58 sq mi)

Population (2011)
  - Total: 1,763
  - Density: 1,180/km^{2} (3,040/sq mi)

Racial makeup (2011)
  - Black African: 99.8%
  - Indian/Asian: 0.1%
  - White: 0.1%

First languages (2011)
  - Northern Sotho: 95.2%
  - Tsonga: 3.4%
  - Other: 1.4%
- Time zone: UTC+2 (SAST)

Skhiming is a village in South Africa, Limpopo Province, Mopani District Municipality, Greater Giyani, Bolobedu. It was founded in 1971 in the Bantustan created by the former Prime Minister of South Africa, Hendrik Verwoerd.

== Geography ==
It is a flat land that is circumvented by the biggest river in Bolobedu called the Molototsi. The original inhabitants of this land belonged to the Ramafalo clan who resided on the flat land during the 18th century. This is one of the vital clans of the Lobedu (or Balobedu) tribe and is regarded as the clan of rain (Bakoto ba go fala ka naka la pula). They are believed to be able to make rain through tribal rituals dating back to the 14th century during their migration from North-West of Africa, now called Zambia and Botswana.

== History ==
In the early 19th century, Skhiming village was just a bush veld populated by wild animals which are now contained in the Northern Kruger National Park. The founders of this land, the Ramafalo clan were bordered by the Lekabe River on the west/north, Khesepe River on the east and Molototsi on the south/west and south/east. Skhiming village was then in 1971 put under the curatorship of Mmatsweu Mmamaila as the head man after the approval of the Ramafalo clan since the Modjadji Kraal decided to resolve the Mmamaila kingship conflict in the Bolobedu North. The Ramafalo clan agreed with the Modjadji kraal to let the Mmamailas be the head of the village.

== Local Government ==
Since the death of the village head the late 1980s, Josias Ramafalo from the Ramafalo clan claimed his fatherland back. This was subsequently approved by all the villagers. Josias was working closely with the head-man Mmatsweu. Josias led the village for approximately five years until the only son of Mmatsweu (Pencil Mmamaila) abruptly assumed leadership. There is a misunderstanding among residents as to why he did so. They wanted the Ramafalo clan to have leadership of their land.

== Education and Hospitals ==
In the late 1970s, Skhiming moved the Seilawa Primary School from the Khesepe region to the village. The name was then changed to the Maloba Primary School. The water borehole was discovered in 1984 and now serves the community with water. In the late 1990s Skhiming village started to develop and was seen as the center in the lower Bolobedu (Boroka). The high school, Makgopela High and the Skhiming Clinic were built. A small shopping complex was planned but failed due to the poor economic conditions.
