= Maruleng Local Municipality elections =

The Maruleng Local Municipality is a Local Municipality in Limpopo, South Africa. The council consists of twenty-seven members elected by mixed-member proportional representation. Fourteen councillors are elected by fourteen first-past-the-post voting in fourteen wards, while the remaining thirteen are chosen from party lists so that the total number of party representatives is proportional to the number of votes received. In the election of 1 November 2021 the African National Congress (ANC) won a majority of fifteen seats.

== Results ==
The following table shows the composition of the council after past elections.

== December 2000 election ==
The following table shows the results of the 2000 election.

Party	Ward			List			Total seats
Party	Votes	%	Seats	Votes	%	Seats	Total seats
African National Congress	13,172	78.57	9	13,052	78.06	6	15
United Democratic Movement	1,613	9.62	0	1,514	9.06	2	2
Democratic Alliance	1,471	8.77	1	1,451	8.68	1	2
Pan Africanist Congress of Azania	508	3.03	0	703	4.20	1	1
Total	16,764	100.00	10	16,720	100.00	10	20
Valid votes	16,764	98.02		16,720	97.86		
Invalid/blank votes	339	1.98		366	2.14		
Total votes	17,103	100.00		17,086	100.00		
Registered voters/turnout	32,844	52.07		32,844	52.02		

== March 2006 election ==
The following table shows the results of the 2006 election.

Party	Ward			List			Total seats
Party	Votes	%	Seats	Votes	%	Seats	Total seats
African National Congress	16,279	76.19	12	16,453	76.98	6	18
Pan Africanist Congress of Azania	2,621	12.27	0	2,440	11.42	3	3
Democratic Alliance	1,802	8.43	0	1,712	8.01	2	2
African Christian Democratic Party	518	2.42	0	456	2.13	1	1
Freedom Front Plus	115	0.54	0	104	0.49	0	0
United Democratic Movement	30	0.14	0	150	0.70	0	0
Alliance for Democracy and Prosperity				59	0.28	0	0
Total	21,365	100.00	12	21,374	100.00	12	24
Valid votes	21,365	98.67		21,374	98.74		
Invalid/blank votes	287	1.33		273	1.26		
Total votes	21,652	100.00		21,647	100.00		
Registered voters/turnout	42,302	51.18		42,302	51.17		

== May 2011 election ==
The following table shows the results of the 2011 election.

Party	Ward			List			Total seats
Party	Votes	%	Seats	Votes	%	Seats	Total seats
African National Congress	19,024	69.21	12	19,561	71.28	7	19
Pan Africanist Congress of Azania	2,498	9.09	1	2,482	9.04	2	3
Congress of the People	2,117	7.70	0	2,379	8.67	2	2
Democratic Alliance	2,041	7.42	1	2,068	7.54	1	2
African People's Convention	602	2.19	0	598	2.18	1	1
Independent candidates	868	3.16	0				0
African Christian Democratic Party	307	1.12	0	321	1.17	0	0
United Democratic Movement	32	0.12	0	35	0.13	0	0
Total	27,489	100.00	14	27,444	100.00	13	27
Valid votes	27,489	98.41		27,444	98.25		
Invalid/blank votes	443	1.59		489	1.75		
Total votes	27,932	100.00		27,933	100.00		
Registered voters/turnout	47,717	58.54		47,717	58.54		

== August 2016 election ==
The following table shows the results of the 2016 election.

Party	Ward			List			Total seats
Party	Votes	%	Seats	Votes	%	Seats	Total seats
African National Congress	15,537	53.21	11	16,362	56.28	4	15
Economic Freedom Fighters	4,970	17.02	0	5,073	17.45	5	5
Democratic Alliance	3,695	12.65	1	3,664	12.60	2	3
Civic Warriors of Maruleng	2,819	9.65	1	2,810	9.66	2	3
Independent candidates	1,153	3.95	1				1
Congress of the People	320	1.10	0	288	0.99	0	0
African People's Convention	216	0.74	0	278	0.96	0	0
Socialist Radical Change	126	0.43	0	153	0.53	0	0
African Christian Democratic Party	97	0.33	0	152	0.52	0	0
Maruleng Community Forum	114	0.39	0	120	0.41	0	0
Pan Africanist Congress of Azania	119	0.41	0	104	0.36	0	0
International Revelation Congress	31	0.11	0	48	0.17	0	0
Agang South Africa	1	0.00	0	22	0.08	0	0
Total	29,198	100.00	14	29,074	100.00	13	27
Valid votes	29,198	98.83		29,074	98.57		
Invalid/blank votes	345	1.17		421	1.43		
Total votes	29,543	100.00		29,495	100.00		
Registered voters/turnout	52,535	56.23		52,535	56.14		

== November 2021 election ==
The following table shows the results of the 2021 election.

Party	Ward			List			Total seats
Party	Votes	%	Seats	Votes	%	Seats	Total seats
African National Congress	15,777	49.94	11	17,922	59.18	4	15
Economic Freedom Fighters	2,973	9.41	0	4,765	15.73	4	4
Independent candidates	6,833	21.63	2				2
Civic Warriors	2,802	8.87	0	3,197	10.56	3	3
Democratic Alliance	2,066	6.54	1	2,728	9.01	1	2
Freedom Front Plus	489	1.55	0	521	1.72	1	1
African People's Convention	334	1.06	0	409	1.35	0	0
Patriotic Alliance	148	0.47	0	230	0.76	0	0
African Christian Democratic Party	78	0.25	0	151	0.50	0	0
Power of Africans Unity	52	0.16	0	133	0.44	0	0
Forum for Service Delivery	16	0.05	0	126	0.42	0	0
Able Leadership	27	0.09	0	103	0.34	0	0
Total	31,595	100.00	14	30,285	100.00	13	27
Valid votes	31,595	98.58		30,285	96.94		
Invalid/blank votes	454	1.42		957	3.06		
Total votes	32,049	100.00		31,242	100.00		
Registered voters/turnout	54,886	58.39		54,886	56.92		
