= Klipkraal =

- Location within Limpopo Location within South Africa
- Coordinates: 23.452°S 30.042°E
- Country: South Africa
- Province: Limpopo
- District: Mopani
- Municipality: Greater Letaba

Area
  - Total: 2.27 km^{2} (0.88 sq mi)

Population (2001)
  - Total: 941
  - Density: 415/km^{2} (1,070/sq mi)
- Time zone: UTC+2 (SAST)

Klipkraal is a town in Greater Letaba Local Municipality in the Limpopo province of South Africa.
