= Madeira, South Africa =

Madeira
- Location within Limpopo Location within South Africa
- Coordinates: 24.262°S 30.432°E
- Country: South Africa
- Province: Limpopo
- District: Mopani
- Municipality: Maruleng

Area
  - Total: 7.5 km^{2} (2.9 sq mi)

Population (2011)
  - Total: 3,844
  - Density: 510/km^{2} (1,300/sq mi)

Racial makeup (2011)
  - Black African: 99.5%
  - Coloured: 0.03%
  - Indian/Asian: 0.1%
  - White: 0.01%
  - Other: 0.01%

First languages (2011)
  - Northern Sotho: 95.5%
  - Other: 4.5%
- Time zone: UTC+2 (SAST)
- Postal code (street): 0890

Madeira is a village (in Tzaneen town) in Mopani District Municipality in the Limpopo province of South Africa.
