= Rotterdam, Limpopo =

Rotterdam Vuyani
- Location within Limpopo Location within South Africa Location within Africa
- Coordinates: 23.400°S 30.278°E
- Country: South Africa
- Province: Limpopo
- District: Mopani
- Municipality: Greater Letaba
  - Councillor: (ANC)

Area
  - Total: 4.41 km^{2} (1.70 sq mi)

Population (2011)
  - Total: 4,649
  - Density: 1,050/km^{2} (2,730/sq mi)

Racial makeup (2011)
  - Black African: 99.8%
  - Indian/Asian: 0.2%

First languages (2011)
  - Tsonga: 98.6%
  - Other: 1.4%
- Time zone: UTC+2 (SAST)
- Postal code (street): 0931
- Area code: 015

Rotterdam is a village in Greater Letaba Local Municipality in the Limpopo province of South Africa. It is named after Rotterdam in the Netherlands. Rotterdam is majority Tsonga speaking village under the Chieftaincy of Hosi Duvula and Hosi Mahuntsi and it is also divided in to sections namely Tshamiseka A, Tshamiseka B, Phongololo, Chaki, Deep 11, Makaringe, Newstand, Mikhilighombo, Mahuntsi and Manyunyu. There are Seven schools;Mahochomba Primary School, Tshamiseka primary school, Rotterdam secondary school, Dumani lower primary school, Berea primary school, Duvula-Mahunts high school, and Mahuntsi primary school.
