= Dinaka =

Dinaka is a traditional musical and dance practice associated with communities in Limpopo, South Africa, including the Balobedu. It involves group music, dancing and traditional instruments.

== Performance ==
Dinaka is commonly performed by groups of men. In Balobedu communities, performances can take place during cultural and community occasions. The musicians perform together while dancers and other members of the community participate.

In Ga-Maphalle, a village in the Balobedu area, Dinaka is described as a musical composition performed by elderly men using wooden flutes and drums. Dinaka performances may take place at the same occasions as Khekhapa, a traditional singing and dancing practice performed by Balobedu women.

== Instruments ==
Traditional Dinaka performances may include wooden flutes, pipes and drums. The instruments provide the rhythm and musical sounds that accompany the performance.

== Cultural significance ==
Dinaka forms part of the musical heritage of communities in Limpopo. Through performances, traditional songs, musical skills and dancing can be shared between generations.

The practice also provides an opportunity for communities to gather during cultural occasions and celebrations.

=== Relationship with Khekhapa ===
In some Balobedu communities, Dinaka and Khekhapa are performed during the same occasions. Khekhapa is associated with women's singing and dancing, while Dinaka is associated with men's musical performances.

== See also ==
- Balobedu
- Kiba (dance)
- Bapedi
- Music of South Africa
