= Letaba River =

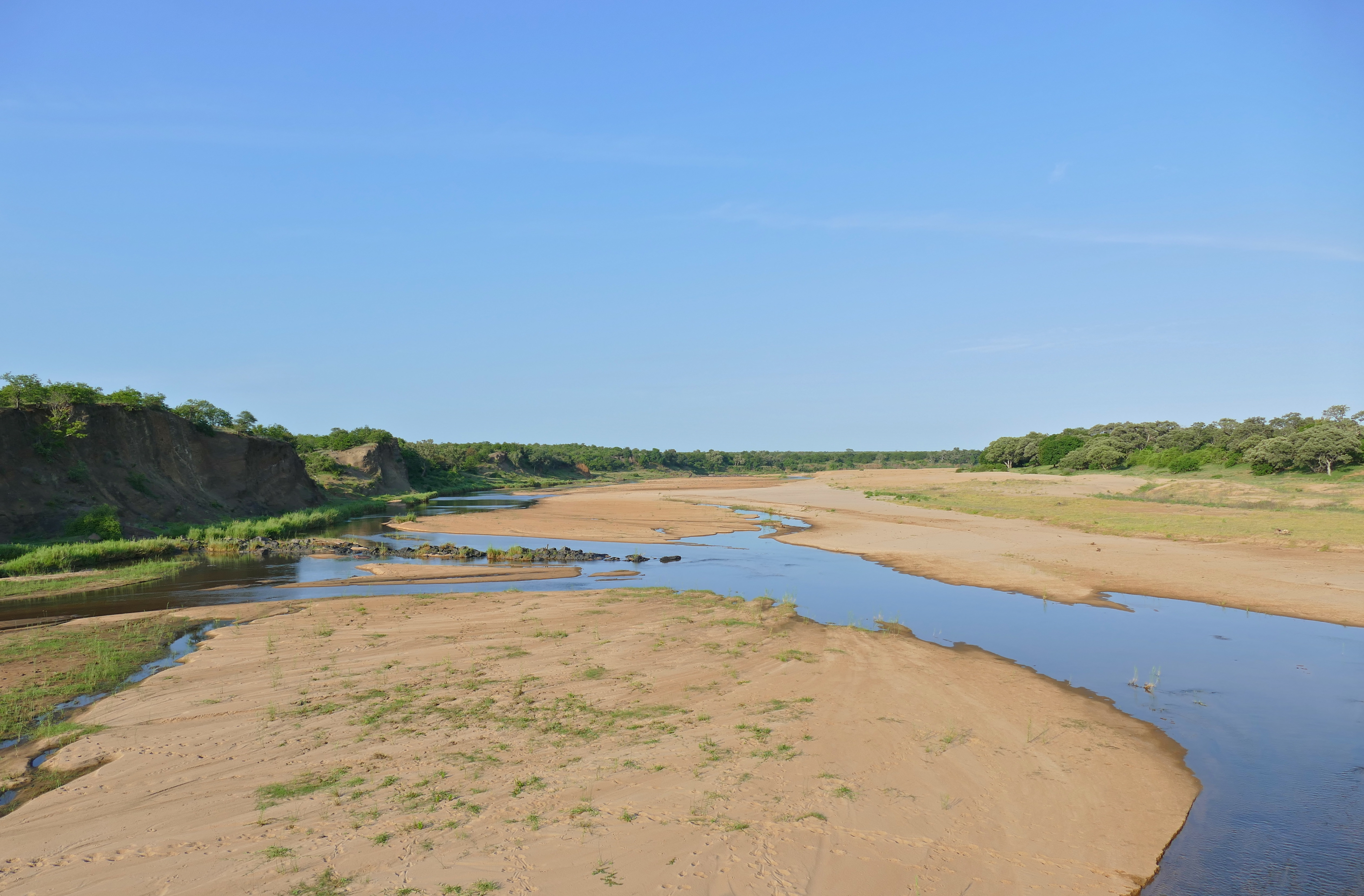
- View of the Letaba River

- Location of the Letaba River's mouth
- Etymology: Meaning "sandy river" in Northern Sotho language
- Native name: Ritavi (Tsonga)

Location
- Country: South Africa
- Region: Limpopo Province

Physical characteristics
- Source
  - location: Gauteng Province
- 2nd source
  - location: Soutpansberg
- Mouth: Olifants River
  - location: Limpopo Province
  - coordinates: 23°59′22″S 31°49′36″E
- Basin size: 67,000 km^{2} (26,000 sq mi)

Basin features
- Tributaries
  - left: Nharhweni River, Ngwenyeni River, Klein Letaba River, Molototsi River, Nsama River
  - right: Groot Letaba River, Nwanedzi River, Makhadzi River

The Letaba River (Afrikaans: Letabarivier), also known as Leţaba, Lehlaba or Ritavi, is a river located in eastern Limpopo Province, South Africa. It is one of the most important tributaries of the Olifants River.

== Course ==
It starts at the confluence of the Groot Letaba River and Klein Letaba River, whence they continue their journey eastwards through the Lowveld as the Letaba River. It joins the Olifants River in the foothills of the Lebombo Mountains, near South Africa's border with Mozambique. In Mozambique, the latter river is called the Rio Elefantes.

Tributaries include the Middle Letaba River, Nharhweni River, Ngwenyeni River, Nwanedzi River, Molototsi River, Nsama River, and Makhadzi River.

== Dams in the basin ==
- Ebenezer Dam
- Tzaneen Dam
- Modjaji Dam, in the Molototsi River
- Hudson Ntsanwisi Dam, in the Nsama River
- Middle Letaba Dam, in the Middle Letaba River
- Engelhard Dam

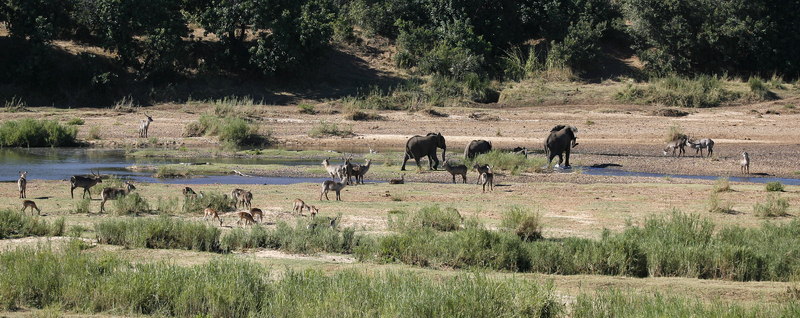
Game animals along its banks, near Letaba camp, central Kruger Park

== See also ==
- Luvubu and Letaba Water Management Area
