= Makobo Modjadji =

Makobo Modjadji VI
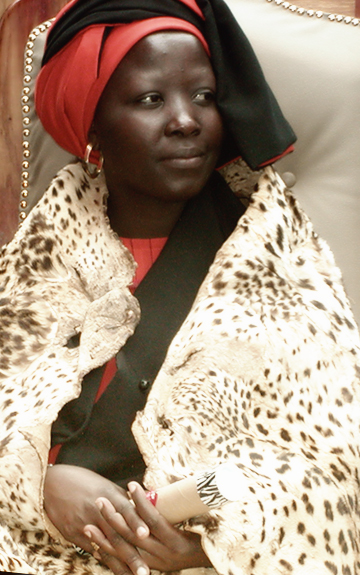
- Queen Makobo in 2003

Rain Queen of Balobedu
- Reign: 16 April 2003 – 12 June 2005
- Coronation: 16 April 2003
- Predecessor: Mokope Modjadji V
- Successor: Masalanabo Modjadji VII
- Born: 22 July 1978; Limpopo, South Africa
- Died: 12 June 2005 (aged 26); Polokwane, Limpopo, South Africa
- Partner: David Mogale (2001-2005)
- Issue: Prince Lekukela; Masalanabo II Modjadji
Names
- Makobo Caroline Modjadji
- House: Modjadji
- Mother: Princess Leakhale Maria Modjadji

Makobo Modjadji VI (Makobo Caroline Modjadji; 22 July 1978 – 12 June 2005) was the sixth in a line of the Lobedu queendom's Rain Queens. It is believed by her people that Makobo Modjadji had the ability to control the clouds and rivers. Makobo became queen on 16 April 2003 at the age of 25, after the death of her predecessor and grandmother, Queen Mokope Modjadji, and she reigned until her own death just two years later. This made her the youngest Queen in the history of the Balobedu nation.

== Life ==
Makobo was the daughter of Princess Leakhale Maria Modjadji and was the first of the Rain Queens to be formally educated. She was crowned Rain Queen in 2003, two years after the death of her grandmother Rain Queen Mokope Modjadji V. Her mother, the designated successor, had died in June 2001, so she never ascended to the throne. It took two years to eventually crown her but nonetheless, Makobo was selected as the next Rain Queen. On the day of the coronation, a slight drizzle fell, which was interpreted as a good omen. The coronation was an elaborate ceremony, but it is believed that Makobo accepted the crown reluctantly.

Although respected for her abilities and lineage, Makobo was seen as too modern to be the next Rain Queen, which may have been why there was such a long delay before she was crowned. Custom dictated that rain queens live reclusive lives, hidden in the royal kraal with Bahlanone "royal women". Makobo, however, drove a car, liked to wear jeans and T-shirts, visit nearby discos, watch soap operas and chat on her cell phone.

Modjadji VI also had a boyfriend, David Mogale, who is said to have fathered her second child, daughter Masalanabo. He is the former municipal manager of Greater Letaba Local Municipality. He is also rumoured to have moved into the Royal Compound to live with her. This caused great controversy with the Royal Council, as the Rain Queen is only ever supposed to have sexual relations with nobles who the Royal Council themselves chose.

== Death and alleged conspiracy ==
On 10 June 2005, Makobo was admitted to the Polokwane Medi-Clinic with a then-undisclosed illness; she died two days later at the age of 26. She was buried at the royal cemetery in Ga-Modjadji, Limpopo on 20 June 2005. Only family members attended the funeral service and thousands of mourners gathered outside the cemetery.

There is a lot of controversy surrounding the last Rain Queen's death. Some villagers believe that she died from a broken heart because her lover David Mogale was banished from the queendom by the Royal Council. Mogale himself claims that the Royal Council poisoned Makobo, as they saw her unfit to hold the much-revered position of Rain Queen, and this was the easiest way to have her removed from the throne. Others claim that her royal ancestors had something to do with it because Makobo, her mother and grandmother all died in June. Hospital staff believed she died of HIV/AIDS, while others were concerned with the disappearance of Makobo's brother, Mpapatla, last seen on the day of Makobo's death. He returned eventually and was appointed regent for his infant niece, Masalanabo.

A fire broke out in the local chief's house, where Makobo's coffin was being kept, before her funeral. The fire was extinguished before Makobo's coffin suffered any damage, but the event seemed to arouse more suspicions of foul play surrounding Makobo's death.

Officially, Makobo died of chronic meningitis.

Regnal titles
Preceded by Mokope Modjadji V	Rain Queen of Balobedu; 2003–2005	Succeeded by Masalanabo Modjadji VII
