= Molototsi River =

- Location of the Molototsi's mouth

Location
- Country: South Africa
- Region: Limpopo

Physical characteristics
- Source: Modjadjiskloof
- Mouth: Groot-Letaba River
  - coordinates: 23.67581°S 30.92138°E
- Length: 120 km (75 mi)
- Basin size: 1,170 km^{2} (452 sq mi)

Map position of the Molototsi River in South Africa.

The Molototsi River is a non-perennial river that runs amongst villages in Bolobedu, South Africa. It ascends from a village called Bodupe and flows to the Modjadji Dam in Ga-Matswi. It then flows down to join the Great Letaba River near the Kruger National Park. Molototsi is one of the sandy rivers in Limpopo Province.

== Activities ==
There are many farms surrounding the river's valley these farming activities are mostly growing vegetables like tomatoes, pumpkins, peppers, and potatoes. Some notable farms include Mabodyane Cooperative, operated in the Ga-Mothele Village by Tsakani David Mukansi and others.

In the Ka-Dzumeri area, prior to the Late Regent Chief Thompson Masirheni Mabunda abolishing the activity, youth from all the 24 villages under Dzumeri used to converge every weekend around the ''old deep tank'' (dibini ra khale) part of the river. They would party and indulge in booze. The Regent Chief barred this practice after a young girl from Ndhambi Village died mysteriously while socialising with others. During the dry months, youth around Bolobedu organise beach football near Skhiming Village where the river is open and extremely sandy

Over the years, commercial sand mining has seen a huge increase with companies such as the Henley Farms, Risava Construction Co and the local Dzumeri Bricks and Sand mine sand from the river.
