= Khikhapa =

Khekhapa is a traditional singing and dancing practice performed by Balobedu women in Limpopo, South Africa. The dance forms part of Balobedu cultural celebrations and community gatherings.

== Performance ==
Khekhapa is traditionally performed by women who wear KheLobedu traditional clothing. The dancers form a circle around drummers while singing and dancing. Performances can take place during particular village and community occasions.

The dance is performed together with traditional drumming and singing. The rhythm of the drums helps guide the movements of the dancers.

== Cultural significance ==
Khekhapa is a form of cultural expression among the Balobedu. It allows members of the community to participate in traditional music, dance and clothing while passing cultural practices from one generation to another.

The practice also provides an opportunity for members of the community to gather and celebrate important occasions.

== Relationship with other Balobedu traditions ==
Khekhapa is associated with other traditional musical practices among the Balobedu. One example is Dinaka, a musical and dance tradition associated with men and involving instruments such as wooden flutes and drums.
