= Balloon, Limpopo =

Balloon
- Location within Limpopo Location within South Africa
- Coordinates: 24.197°S 30.381°E
- Country: South Africa
- Province: Limpopo
- District: Mopani
- Municipality: Maruleng

Area
  - Total: 5.32 km^{2} (2.05 sq mi)

Population (2011)
  - Total: 3,093
  - Density: 581/km^{2} (1,510/sq mi)

Racial makeup (2011)
  - Black African: 100.0%

First languages (2011)
  - Northern Sotho: 96.2%
  - Other: 3.8%
- Time zone: UTC+2 (SAST)

Balloon is a town in Mopani District Municipality in the Limpopo province of South Africa.
