= Modjadjiskloof =

Modjadjiskloof Duiwelskloof
- Location within Limpopo Location within South Africa
- Coordinates: 23°42′S 30°08′E
- Country: South Africa
- Province: Limpopo
- District: Mopani
- Municipality: Greater Letaba

Area
  - Total: 2.99 km^{2} (1.15 sq mi)
- Elevation: 875 m (2,871 ft)

Population (2023)
  - Total: 261,000
  - Density: 87,300/km^{2} (226,000/sq mi)

Racial makeup (2011)
  - Black African: 47.4%
  - Coloured: 0.5%
  - Indian/Asian: 2.8%
  - White: 47.9%
  - Other: 1.5%

First languages (2023)
  - Afrikaans: 43.7%
  - Northern Sotho: 23.3%
  - English: 12.3%
  - Tsonga: 9.7%
  - Other: 11.0%
- Time zone: UTC+2 (SAST)
- Postal code (street): 0835
- PO box: 0835
- Area code: 015

Modjadjiskloof (formerly Duiwelskloof) is a large town situated at the foot of the escarpment in the Limpopo province of South Africa.

The town is 18 km north of Tzaneen. Surveyed in 1919 and proclaimed in 1920, it was administered by an urban management board. The Sunland Baobab tree, that was located nearby, lost a large chunk of its main stem early in 2017 and the rest of the tree fell into pieces in April 2017. Panorama and Home 2000 are suburbs of Modjadjiskloof.Kgapane is a township of Modjadjiskloof.

The town was named in honour of Rain Queen Modjadji, hereditary ruler of the Lobedu people, the indigenous people of the area and at some stage the only ruling queen in South Africa. It is near to her royal compound in Khetlhakone village.

== Name change ==
The former name Duiwelskloof, Afrikaans for "Devil's ravine", was possibly given by virtue of the rugged, awe inspiring aspect, or because of the difficulty with which laden wagons trekked through it in the rainy season. Duiwelskloof was renamed Modjadjiskloof on 14 June 2004. Unlike most name changes, Duiwelskloof kept the Afrikaans suffix "-kloof" (meaning valley) in its new name.
