= Muyexe =

- Location within Limpopo Location within South Africa
- Coordinates: 23.195110°S 30.915969°E
- Country: South Africa
- Province: Limpopo
- District: Mopani
- Municipality: Greater Giyani

Area
  - Total: 3.42 km^{2} (1.32 sq mi)

Population (2011)
  - Total: 3,228
  - Density: 944/km^{2} (2,440/sq mi)

Racial makeup (2011)
  - Black African: 99.9%
  - White: 0.1%

First languages (2011)
  - Tsonga: 97.1%
  - English: 1.8%
  - Other: 1.1%
- Time zone: UTC+2 (SAST)

Muyexe is a village and rural township in the Mopani District, Limpopo Province, South Africa. It is located in the eastern side of Giyani township, about 35km away and closer to the Kruger National in Shingwedzi Camp. It is under the chief Ndabezitha Muyexe of Maluleke clan.

In 2009 the national Comprehensive Rural Development Programme (CRDP) identified Muyexe as one of the poorest villages in South Africa, noting that it lacked basic services such as water, electricity, proper roads, or adequate housing. The CRDP promised to help the local farmers farm more productively by providing tractors and other agricultural equipment. The Minister for Rural Development and Land Reform, Gugile Nkwinti, his Deputy, Dr Joe Phaahla, and the Limpopo Premier, Cassel Mathale, promised to visit the village from time to time to supervise the work and make sure that community members were getting better services.

In 2011, the CRDP declared the project at Muyexe to be a success, with the majority of the needs of the 900 households in the village having been met. However, as of 2011 adequate water remained a serious problem as there was no permanent water supply, no tractor yet had been supplied, and jobs remained scarce. By 2013, despite equipping boreholes with pumps and installing a water purification plant, residents still did not have access to piped water, and poverty and unemployment remained major problems. In 2013, President Jacob Zuma promised that a pipeline from the Nsami dam on the Groot Letaba River would bring water to the village.
