= Mokope Modjadji =

Mokope Modjadji V

Rain Queen of Balobedu
- Reign: 1981–2001
- Predecessor: Makoma Modjadji IV
- Successor: Makobo Modjadji VI
- Born: 27 April 1937; Limpopo, South Africa
- Died: 28 June 2001 (age 64); Limpopo, South Africa
- Issue: Princess Makheala Stellah Modjadji; Prince Masopha Edwin Modjadji (among others)
- House: Modjadji
- Father: Andreas Maake
- Mother: Makoma Modjadji

Mokope Modjadji V (27 April 1937 – 28 June 2001) was the fifth Rain Queen of the Lobedu queendom, the Balobedu nation in the Limpopo Province of South Africa from 1981 until her death in 2001.

== Life ==
Mokope Modjadji was very traditional in her role as Rain Queen. She lived in seclusion in the Royal Compound in Khetlhakone Village and followed all the customs the Rain Queens were expected to follow.

Mokope Modjadji met and became good friends with the then President of South Africa Nelson Mandela in 1994. Mandela could speak to Mokope only through the traditional intermediary.

Later they became better friends and Mandela bought the Rain Queen a Japanese car to help her travel up the steep roads to her Royal Compound. He was then able to meet her in person and when asked about the Rain Queen Mandela said that, just like Queen Elizabeth II, Queen Modjadji did not answer questions.

On other political fronts, Queen Mokope did not support the idea of an ANC government as she believed that its anti-traditional ideas would dilute her authority. However once the ANC came to power, they treated the Rain Queen with respect. She was even offered an annual salary.

Mokope Modjadji had three children, including her designated successor, Princess Leakheli Stella Modjadji had died first.He second daughter Princess Makheala died in 2001, two days before the death of her mother. Queen Mokope died at the age of 65. Leakheli’s daughter, Makobo, became the next Rain Queen. Mokope's son, Prince Masopha Edwin Modjadji, died in August 2005.

Preceded by Makoma Modjadji IV	Rain Queen of Balobedu; 1981–2001	Succeeded by Makobo Modjadji VI
