= Khetoane Modjadji =

Khesethwane Modjadji III
- Rain Queen

Rain Queen of Balobedu
- Reign: 1895–1959
- Predecessor: Masalanabo Modjadji II
- Successor: Makoma Modjadji IV
- Born: 1869; South African Republic Mojidini Lobedu queendom, South Africa
- Died: 1959 (aged 89–90); Lobedu queendom Transvaal Province in an area now Limpopo, South Africa
- Issue: Makoma Modjadji
Names
- Khesetoane Modjadji
- House: Modjadji
- Father: Bakhoma Kgatla
- Mother: Princess Leakhali Modjadji

Khesethwane Modjadji III (1869 – 1959) became the third Rain Queen from the Lobedu queendom, the South African Balobedu nation of the South African Limpopo Province. Khesethwane reigned from 1895 to 1959. She was preceded by Rain Queen Masalanabo Modjadji II and succeeded by Rain Queen Makoma Modjadji IV.

== Life ==
Khesetoane was born in the 1869 and died in 1959 age 89 or 90. In 1894 her predecessor, Masalanabo Modjadji, committed ritual suicide by ingesting a poison, Maselekwane had done the same to pass her spirit and power to the next rain queen. Khesethwane was the daughter of Masalanabo's great wife and sister, Princess Leakhali. Khesethwane who was a commoner through her father, and became the heir to the throne. Queen Masalanabo's royal council had already designated her as the next Queen before Masalanabo's death because Masalababo was childless or without any daughters. She was the longest reigning Rain Queen for being on the throne for 64 years. She chose her daughter Makoma to become her successor. Khesethwane is believed to have cursed the rest of the Rain Queen lineage because of her refusal to commit ritual suicide when the time came upon nearing her death.

| Preceded by Masalanabo Modjadji | Rain Queen of Balobedu; 1895–1959 | Succeeded by Makoma Modjadji |
