= Masalanabo Modjadji =

Masalanabo Modjadji II

Rain Queen of Balobedu
- Reign: 1854–1894
- Coronation: 1854
- Predecessor: Maselekwane Modjadji
- Successor: Khetoane Modjadji
- Born: 1814; Lobedu queendom
- Died: 1894 (aged 79–80); Limpopo, South Africa
- Great Wife: Princess Leakhali Modjadji
- House: Modjadji
- Mother: Maselekwane Modjadji

Masalanabo Modjadji II (died 1894) was the second Rain Queen of the Lobedu queendom (in present-day South Africa). Masalanabo committed ritual suicide in 1894.

== Reign ==
Masalanabo reigned from 1854 to 1894. She was preceded by Maselekwane Modjadji I.

During the native "location policies" of the early 1890s, Commandant-General Piet Joubert (1834–1900) surrounded the Rain Queen's home until she was forced to give herself up. Historian Louis Changuion wrote, "It would be the first time that white people would see the Rain Queen." However, what happened was not what they had expected. "After four days," Changuion continues, an elderly black woman was carried out on a litter, accompanied by her chief indunas, to negotiate with the white people. It was a great disappointment to the men watching the proceedings – of 'She-who-must-be-obeyed' there was no trace. She was not the white woman of the legends. It is told that Joubert presented her with a "kappie" (bonnet) and a blanket."

According to the book Realm of a rain-queen, Joubert was shown not the real Rain Queen, but an impersonator.

A mysterious figure who only rarely appeared in public, Masalanabo had no children. She died childless

She: A History of Adventure

At some point the royal council designated the daughter of "great wife" and sister Princess Leakhali as heir to the throne. Khesethoane inherited the throne. Princess Leakhali was a commoner through his father and she was born out of wedlock . Also the father of Queen Khesetoane was a commoner. Masalanabo committed ritual suicide in 1894, after having named Leakhali as her successor.

She was succeeded by Khetoane Modjadji III.

== Legacy ==
Among other female authorities in Africa, Masalanabo Modjadji is said to be the inspiration for H. Rider Haggard's novel She: A History of Adventure. However, the praise for the influence of female authority on the book is not without criticism. Critics argue that the representation of womanhood in the book and similar works in the field of literary tourism did not only mirror and further imperialist initiatives but "She is also a thinly disguised allegorical admonition to recognize and dispel the threat that the New Woman posed to late-Victorian society".

Preceded by Maselekwane Modjadji	Rain Queen of Balobedu; 1854–1894	Succeeded by Khesetoane
