= Nharhweni River =

- Location of the Nharhweni River's mouth in Limpopo, South Africa.
- Etymology: Meaning "stony river" in Tsonga language

Location
- Country: South Africa
- Region: Limpopo Province

Physical characteristics
- Mouth: Letaba River
  - location: Limpopo Province
  - coordinates: 23.70357°S 31.21816°E
  - elevation: 287 m

The Nharhweni River (meaning "stony river") is located in eastern Limpopo, South Africa.

Tributaries include the Ngwenyeni River, Nwanedzi River and Makhadzi River.
