= R527 road =

R527 road may refer to:

- R527 road (Ireland)
- R527 (South Africa)
