= Sipho Mashele =

South African cricketer

Sipho Mashele (born 22 January 1987) was a South African cricketer. He was a right-handed batsman and a right-arm medium-fast bowler who played for Limpopo. He was born in Namakgale.

Mashele made his first-class debut for Limpopo against Namibia in October 2006, having played a single match in the 2005-06 competition. On his debut, he took the wicket of Bjorn Kotze, and scored just eight runs in his first innings, partnering Jacques Pretorius in the tailend.

Where Pretorius was comparatively successful with the bat, however, Mashele struggled, scoring a first-class best of just 10 runs against Mpumalanga.

Mashele made his final appearance for the team against Gauteng in February 2007, as Limpopo finished second-bottom of the One-Day table, and second-bottom, and winless, in the three-day table.
