= Modjadji Head Kraal =

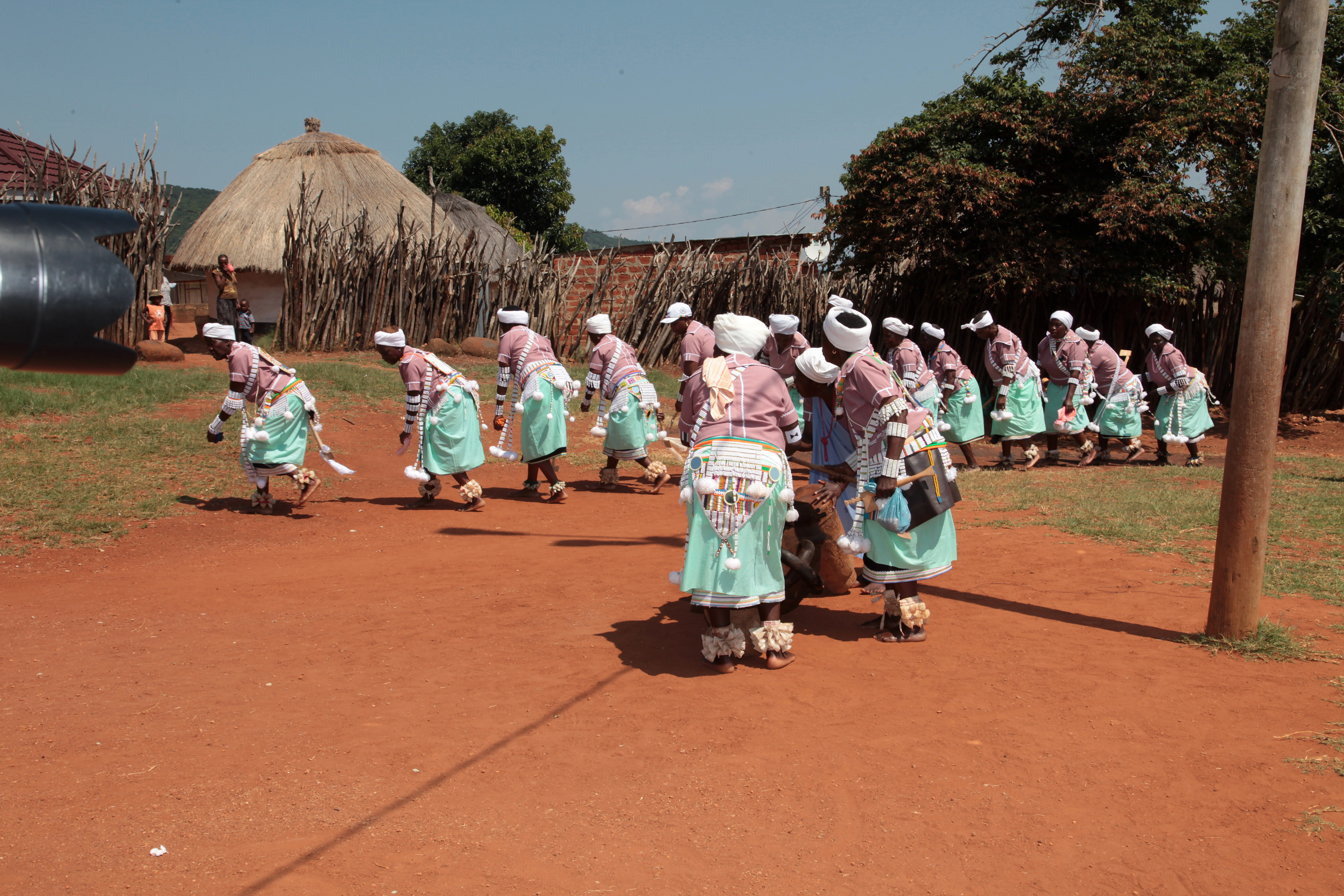

- Location within Limpopo Location within South Africa
- Coordinates: 23°37′36″S 30°20′51″E
- Country: South Africa
- Province: Limpopo
- District: Mopani
- Municipality: Greater Letaba

Area
  - Total: 3.25 km^{2} (1.25 sq mi)

Population (2011)
  - Total: 1,745
  - Density: 537/km^{2} (1,390/sq mi)

Racial makeup (2011)
  - Black African: 99.9%
  - Coloured: 0.1%
  - Other: 0.1%

First languages (2011)
  - Northern Sotho: 64.8%
  - Sotho: 30.7%
  - Afrikaans: 2.4%
  - Other: 2.2%
- Time zone: UTC+2 (SAST)
- Area code: 015

Modjadji Head Kraal is the royal compound of the Lobedu Rain Queen, and is located within the village of Khetlhakone in the Limpopo province of South Africa. It is nearby Modjadjiskloof.
