= Maselekwane Modjadji =

Maselekwane Modjadji I

Rain Queen of Balobedu
- Reign: 1800–1854
- Coronation: 1800
- Predecessor: Position established
- Successor: Masalanabo Modjadji
- Born: 1782; Mojidini, Lobedu queendom
- Died: 1854 (aged 71–72); Mojidini, Lobedu queendom
- Issue: Masalanabo Modjadji; Princess Leakhali Modjadji
- House: Modjadji
- Father: Mokoto, King of Balozwi
- Mother: Princess Dzungundini

Maselekwane Modjadji I was born in 1782 and was the first Rain Queen of the South African Lobedu queendom. Maselekwane reigned from 1800 to 1854. She was succeeded by Rain Queen Masalanabo Modjadji II.

The woman who became the first Modjadji was known as Maselekwane Modjadji I. She lived in complete seclusion, deep in the forest where she practiced secretive rituals to make rain. Maselekwane committed ritual suicide by ingesting poison in 1854. She was seen as an intercessor or intermediary between her people, the royal ancestors and the rain goddess.

== Origin ==
Maselekwane was a direct descendant of the royal house of Monomotapa which reigned over the Kalanga people of the current day Zimbabwe in the 1400-1500s. The kingdom of Monomotapa was prosperous and their people oversaw the construction of the Zimbabwe Ruins. In the latter part of the 1500s, the royal family experienced a crisis when the king's son and daughter had an incestuous affair and conceived an illegitimate child. The king was forced to banish his daughter from the kingdom, and she fled south to what is now Limpopo, South Africa.

Over the next two centuries, a kingdom was eventually established in the area now known as Bolobedu. During the latter part of the 1700s, the then Kgoshikgolo Mambo Mokoto was warned by ancestral spirits in a dream or apparition that all his sons are plotting to assassinate and/or overthrow him and the solution to his imminent fate was to have all his sons killed and then marry and impregnate his daughter, Princess Dzungundini. By doing so they ensured him that the new heir to his throne will be a queen with power over rainfall and thus a dynasty of women, a queenship was founded.

After marrying her father, the queen, Dzungundini gave birth to a son Tladi whom was strangled as an infant by his father. The second child was a daughter whom they named Maselekwane. She was also called Modjadji (Motjatji) because she was born when the sun was very hot and the title is used by all subsequent Rain Queens. She was born in 1782 and in 1800 when she was 18 years old she took the throne to be Queen.

== History ==
Queen Modjadji rules over a relatively small kingdom. However, she has been revered by people far beyond her tiny kingdom. According to legend it is said that King Shaka spared her in exchange for rain. It is also said that he used to send black cattle to Modjadji I to pay tribute but historically King Shaka never moved past Northern Zululand. King Moshoeshoe I of Lesotho, the Swati kings and many others in southern Africa paid tributes to her to bring them rain.

During her reign, she had at least two children. Masalanabo Modjadji II and Princess Leakhali.

In 1854, she committed ritual suicide. This was done to pass her spirit over to reside within the next Rain Queen and to increase her rainmaking power. This was also believed to immortalise her.

Preceded by None	Rain Queen of Balobedu; 1800–1854	Succeeded by Masalanabo Modjadji
