= Tony Rachoene =

South African politician

Tony Rachoene MPL

Member of the Limpopo Executive Council for Public Works, Roads and Infrastructure
- Incumbent
- Assumed office 20 June 2024
- Premier: Phophi Ramathuba
- Preceded by: Nkakareng Rakgoale

Member of the Limpopo Provincial Legislature
- Incumbent
- Assumed office 14 June 2024

Personal details
- Born: Ernest Sebataolo Rachoene; 2 March 1988 (age 38)
- Party: African National Congress
- Profession: Politician

Ernest Sebataolo "Tony" Rachoene (born 2 March 1988) is a South African politician from Limpopo. A member of the African National Congress (ANC), he has been Limpopo's Member of the Executive Council (MEC) for Public Works, Roads and Infrastructure since June 2024.

== Early life and education ==
Rachoene was born on 2 March 1988. While serving in government, he completed an honours degree in public administration at MANCOSA.

== Political career ==
Rachoene rose to political prominence as the provincial chairperson of the ANC Youth League's Limpopo branch. In the May 2024 general election, while still heading the Youth League branch, he was elected to represent the ANC in the Limpopo Provincial Legislature, ranked fifth on the provincial party list. He was also appointed to the provincial government: announcing her new Executive Council on 18 June 2024, newly elected Premier Phophi Ramathuba named Rachoene as Member of the Executive Council (MEC) for Public Works, Roads and Infrastructure.

Within months of his appointment to the Executive Council, Rachoene launched a protracted battle over the governance of Road Agency Limpopo, one of the public entities in his portfolio; he dissolved the agency's board and suspended its CEO, leading to a lawsuit in which the Polokwane High Court ruled his actions unlawful.

In March 2026, following his graduation from the Youth League, Rachoene was elected as an ordinary member of the mainstream ANC's Provincial Executive Committee. The committee also selected Rachoene as the party's provincial spokesperson.
