= Makoma Modjadji =

Makoma Modjadji IV
- Queen Makoma Modjadji IV on her coronation day

Rain Queen of Balobedu
- Reign: 1959–1980
- Predecessor: Khesethwane Modjadji
- Successor: Mokope Modjadji
- Born: 1905; Khehlakoni Lobedu queendom, Transvaal Colony South Africa
- Died: 1980 (aged 74–75); Lobedu queendom, South Africa
- Spouse: Andreas Maake
- Issue: Mokope Modjadji (among others)
Names
- Makoma Modjadji
- House: Modjadji
- Father: Bakhoma Mokoto II
- Mother: Khesethwane Modjadji

Makoma Modjadji IV (1905 – 1980) was the fourth Rain Queen of the Lobedu queendom, the Balobedu nation of the Limpopo Province of South Africa, succeeding her mother, Queen Khesetoane Modjadji III, in 1959 and reigning until her death. She married Andreas Maake, with whom she had several children. In 1960 Balobedu Royal Council appointed a Male Regent, Wallace Mokoto, who died in 1962. After the regent died, they brought Makoma as the Queen. Mokoto royal family opposed the installation of Makoma as the Monarch by claiming she is a commoner and don't have royal blood of King Mokoto.

In 1972, the apartheid regime reduced Makoma Modjadji's title to that of chieftainess, and incorporated the villages and indunas under her jurisdiction into the Lebowa and Gazankulu homelands.

She was succeeded by her eldest daughter, Mokope Modjadji.

Preceded by Khesetoane Modjadji III	Rain Queen of Balobedu; 1959–1980	Succeeded by Mokope Modjadji V
