= Masalanabo Modjadji VII =

Masalanabo II Modjadji VII

Rain Queen of Balobedu
- Reign: 20 January 2023 – present
- Predecessor: Makobo Modjadji
- Contender: Prince Lekukela Hex Modjadji (brother)
- Born: 20 January 2005 (age 21); Limpopo, South Africa
- House: Modjadji
- Father: David Mogale
- Mother: Rain Queen Makobo Modjadji VI

Masalanabo Modjadji VII (born 20 January 2005) is the seventh and reigning Rain Queen of the Lobedu queendom. Her title was formally recognised by the South African government in 2024, following a lengthy period of royal dispute and legal challenges. As Rain Queen, she is traditionally believed to have special power over rainfall.

== Early life and education ==
Masalanabo was born to Queen Makobo Modjadji, who died when Masalanabo was nearly three months old. Her succession to the throne was delayed due to her age and the complex royal disputes that followed her mother's death. Despite being widely expected to ascend as the next Rain Queen, the Modjadji Royal Council, led by her regent and older half-brother Prince Lekukela, contested her recognition, claiming that the proper traditional processes had not been followed. The royal council of Prince Regent Mpapatla also raised objections to her upbringing in Johannesburg under the guidance of former legal advisor Mathole Motshekga and politician Angie Motshekga, accusing them of manipulating the situation for personal gain. The couple denied the accusations and said that the regent and his council want to claim the crown under false pretenses for Prince Lekukela for their own reasons. The Balobedu Royal Council endorsed her accession on 20 January 2023, when she turned 18.

Masalanabo is the second Rain Queen to receive a formal education, after her mother Makobo. She began her schooling at the age of nine and plays sports. She was the first reigning Rain Queen to pass her matric, and reportedly intends to study social development or law at the university level.

== Reign ==
In December 2024, Masalanabo's right to the throne was legally recognised by President Cyril Ramaphosa under the Traditional Khoi-San Leadership Act, making her the only legally recognised female monarch in South Africa, ranking among powerful kings such as Zulu King Misuzulu Sinqobile kaZwelithini. At the age of 19, she was also the youngest Rain Queen. Her ascension to the throne marks the continuation of the Modjadji queenship legacy. This dynasty has followed a matrilineal primogeniture custom for over 200 years, with leadership passed down through a female-only line, a tradition that continues with Masalanabo's ascension.

Originally planned for August 2023, her coronation has been postponed several times. Her official coronation was scheduled for 12 March 2025, but was postponed to August to commemorate women's month in South Africa. However, the coronation has been officially canceled because of ongoing legal disputes over the rightful heir to the throne.

Regnal titles
Preceded by Makobo Modjadji	Rain Queen of Balobedu; 2023–present	Incumbent
