= Engelhard Dam =

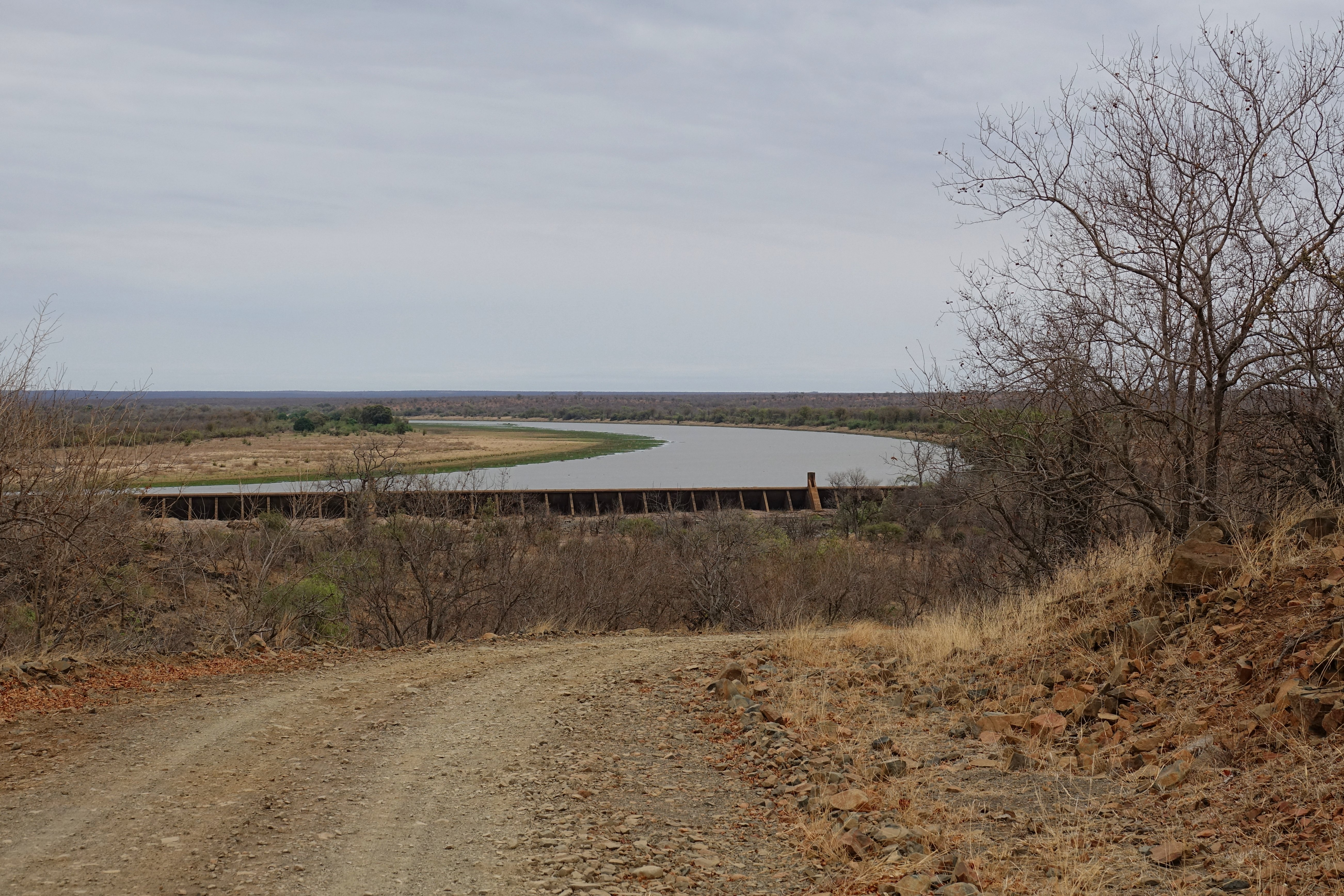
- The Engelhard Dam seen from the east
- Interactive map of Engelhard Dam
- Official name: Engelhard Dam
- Country: South Africa
- Location: Kruger National Park
- Coordinates: 23°50′13″S 31°38′16″E
- Purpose: Regulating water flow
- Owner: SANParks

Dam and spillways
- Type of dam: Gravity dam
- Impounds: Letaba River

Reservoir
- Creates: Engelhard Dam Reservoir

Engelhard Dam is a dam on the Letaba River, between the Letaba and Olifants Rest camps in Kruger National Park, Limpopo, South Africa. Its main function is to regulate water flow down the Letaba in the direction of Mozambique.

The construction of the dam in the 1970s was funded by the American industrialist Charles W. Engelhard, Jr.

== See also ==
- List of reservoirs and dams in South Africa
- List of rivers of South Africa
