= Ebenezer Dam =

- Interactive map of Ebenezer Dam
- Official name: Ebenezer Dam
- Country: South Africa
- Location: Tzaneen, Limpopo
- Coordinates: 23°56′20″S 29°59′11″E
- Purpose: Domestic, agricultural, livestock and recreational purposes
- Opening date: 1959
- Owner: Department of Water Affairs
- Operator: Department of Water Affairs

Dam and spillways
- Type of dam: Earth fill dam
- Impounds: Groot Letaba River
- Height: 61 m (200 ft)
- Length: 312 m (1,024 ft)

Reservoir
- Creates: Ebenezer Dam Reservoir
- Total capacity: 70,118,000 m^{3} (2.4762×10^{9} cu ft)
- Catchment area: 169 km^{2} (65 sq mi)
- Surface area: 386.2 ha (954 acres)

Ebenezer Dam is an earth-fill type dam on the Groot Letaba River, near Tzaneen, Limpopo, South Africa. The Broederstroom also flows into the dam. It was established in 1959 and its primary purpose is for municipal and industrial usage. The dam's hazard potential has been ranked to be high.

== See also ==
- List of reservoirs and dams in South Africa
- List of rivers of South Africa
