= Vuyani =

Vuyani is a given name. Notable people with the name include:

- Vuyani Bungu (born 1967), South African professional boxer
- Vuyani Pambo (born 1989), South African politician
