= Rain Queen =

Hereditary queen of Balobedu

Modjadji
- Royal house
- Country: South Africa
- Current region: Limpopo
- Founded: 1800
- Founder: Maselekwane Modjadji I
- Current head: Masalanabo Modjadji VII
- Seat: Khetlhakone, Bolobedu
- Titles: The Rain Queen; She who must be obeyed

Queen Modjadji, or the Rain Queen, is the hereditary queen of Balobedu, a people of the Limpopo Province of South Africa. The Rain Queen is believed to have special powers, including the ability to control the clouds and rainfall. She is known as a mystical and historic figure who brought rain to her allies and drought to her enemies. In precolonial times she ruled a state, but in the present day she constitutes a non-sovereign monarchy.

The current queen is Masalanabo Modjadji VII, who ascended to the position in 2023 following a lengthy succession dispute with a male claimant.

== History ==
There are several different stories relating to the creation and history of the Rain Queens of Balobedu. One story states that an old chief in 16th century Monomotapa (South eastern Zimbabwe), was told by his ancestors that by impregnating his daughter, Dzugundini, she would gain rain-making skills. Another story involves a scandal in the same chief's house, in which the chief's son impregnated Dzugundini. Dzugundini was held responsible and was forced to flee the village. Dzugundini ended up in Molototsi Valley, which is in the present day Balobedu Kingdom.

The village she established with her loyal followers was ruled by a Mokoto, a male leader, but the peace and harmony of the village were disrupted by rivalries between different families; therefore, to pacify the land, Mokoto impregnated his own daughter in order to restore the tribe's matrilineal tradition. In another version, Mokoto had a vision that he had to marry his daughter in order to create a matrilineal dynasty. She gave birth to the first Rain Queen, known as Modjadji, which means: "ruler of the day".

During the 1930s, social anthropologists Eileen Krige and Jack Krige carried out fieldwork on the society of the Rain Queens. Their work was published in 1943 as The Realm of a Rain-Queen. A Study of the Pattern of Lovedu Society, and remains one of the standard anthropological works.

== Customs ==
According to custom, the Rain Queen must shun public functions, and can only communicate with her people through her male or female councillors.

Every November she presides over the annual rainmaking ceremony at her royal compound in Khetlhakone Village.

She is not supposed to marry, but has many "wives", as they are referred to in the Balobedu language. These are not spouses in the usual sense of the word; as a queen regnant, she has the equivalent of royal court servants, or ladies-in-waiting, sent from many villages all over the Balobedu Kingdom. These wives were selected by The Queen's Royal Council and in general are from the households of the subject chiefs. This ritual of "bride giving" is strictly a form of diplomacy to ensure loyalty to the Queen.

The Rain Queen's mystical rain-making powers are believed to be reflected in the lush garden which surrounds her royal compound. Surrounded by parched land, her garden contains the world's largest cycad trees which are in abundance under a spectacular rain belt. One species of cycad, the Modjadji cycad, is named after the Rain Queen. The rain-making powers are also believed to be transmitted through matriarchal mitochondrial DNA. Therefore, the Queenship is inherited through matrilineal lineage by the daughters of the Rain queen.

The Rain Queen is a prominent figure in South Africa, many communities respecting her position and, historically, attempting to avoid conflict in deference thereto. The fifth Rain Queen, Mokope Modjadji, maintained cordial relations with Nelson Mandela. Even presidents of South Africa during apartheid visited the Rain Queens.

The Rain Queen has become a figure of interest; she and the royal institution have become a significant tourist attraction contributing to the South African economy. The Rain Queen was offered an annual government civil list as a result. The stipend was also expected to help defray the costs of preserving the cycad trees found in the Rain Queen's gardens.

=== Rain song ===
The following is a rendition of Nalee nalee valoi! ("Nalee nalee witchdoctors!"), a Lobedu rain song. It is primarily performed when someone is approaching the queen to ask for rain, but is also sung when someone is travelling (accompanied by a procession) to give gifts or praise to the queen. The song is only sung by women, with a soloist singing the first two lines, and a choir the next one, after which they alternate in 'call and response' fashion, such that the choir sings the refrain. Nalee nalee calls for attention, and valoi can refer to witchdoctors or historical Tsonga invaders (Malegudu was likely head of the Lobedu army). The procession wears 'dancing clothes' (ge abara ngwe), which have a leopard skin print (a symbol of royalty). According to Annekie Joubert, the song means to warn witchdoctors not to interfere with the queen's rainmaking, but can also serve as praise of the queen's power and a threat to her enemies (eg. the Tsonga invaders).

Lobedu (Northern Sotho)

Nalee nalee valoi!
O nalee nalee nalee!
Re ya mosaɖa ga khomo
O-wo-wo-ye
Re ya mosaɖa ga khomo
Mmalo Valovedu ha re khaʈhiana
Re ya mosaɖa ga khomo
Ee re dadzisidžwe ge merula
Re ya mosaɖa ga khomo
Mmalo merula va khe ra Vaʈhoga
Re ya mosaɖa ga khomo
Ee-we-we-ye, we-we-we
Re ya mosaɖa ga khomo
O gae Malegudu la Mašwene?
Re ya mosaɖa ga khomo
A-he-he-eh-he-ahee
Re ya mosaɖa ga khomo
Thivolla masiisii
Re ya mosaɖa ga khomo
Malegudu melede ya diphephene
Re ya mosaɖa ga khomo
Ee-we-wee-ahee
Re ya mosaɖa ga khomo
Ahee-he-ehee-ahee, ahee-he-ehee-ahee, ahee-ahe-ahee-ahee
Re ya mosaɖa ga khomo
We-le-wee-ya-hee
Re ya mosaɖa ga khomo
Mmalo ge ile ge abara ngwe
Re ya mosaɖa ga khomo
Le ile le thanola mavala re vone
Re ya mosaɖa ga khomo
Ee-we-we-valoi
Re ya mosaɖa ga khomo
Ee-we-wee-he
Re ya mosaɖa ga khomo
Ahee-he-ehee-ahee, ahee-he-ehee-ahee, ahee-he-ehee-ahee
Re ya mosaɖa ga khomo
Ee-we-wee-we, ewe-ewee-we
Re ya mosaɖa ga khomo
Ndžu la ga ha le a file ga ho yeba
Re ya mosaɖa ga khomo
Mmalo ge ile ge abara ngwe Valovedu thanola mavala re vone
Re ya mosaɖa ga khomo
Ee-we-wee-e, ee-we-wee-e
Re ya mosaɖa ga khomo

Translation:
English

Nalee nalee witchdoctors!
O nalee nalee nalee!
We are going to the capital with a beast
O-wo-wo-ye
We are going to the capital with a beast
Goodness Valovedu we are not many
We are going to the capital with a beast
Ee we were inundated with marula trees
We are going to the capital with a beast
Goodness with marula trees we refer to the Tsonga people
We are going to the capital with a beast
Ee-we-we-ye, we-we-we
We are going to the capital with a beast
Where is Malegudu of Mašwene?
We are going to the capital with a beast
A-he-he-eh-he-ahee
We are going to the capital with a beast
Unleash the scorpions
We are going to the capital with a beast
Malegudu the holes of the scorpions
We are going to the capital with a beast
Ee-we-wee-ahee
We are going to the capital with a beast
Ahee-he-ehee-ahee, ahee-he-ehee-ahee, ahee-ahe-ahee-ahee
We are going to the capital with a beast
We-le-wee-ya-hee
We are going to the capital with a beast
Goodness I once wore a leopard skin
We are going to the capital with a beast
Turn inside out your colours let us see
We are going to the capital with a beast
Ee-we-we witchdoctors
We are going to the capital with a beast
Ee-we-wee-he
We are going to the capital with a beast
Ahee-he-ehee-ahee, ahee-he-ehee-ahee, ahee-he-ehee-ahee
We are going to the capital with a beast
Ee-we-wee-we, ewe-ewee-we
We are going to the capital with a beast
My voice is not tired of singing
We are going to the capital with a beast
Goodness I once put on a leopard skin Balobedu turn inside out your colours let us see
We are going to the capital with a beast
Ee-we-wee-e, ee-we-wee-e
We are going to the capital with a beast

== Makobo Modjadji ==
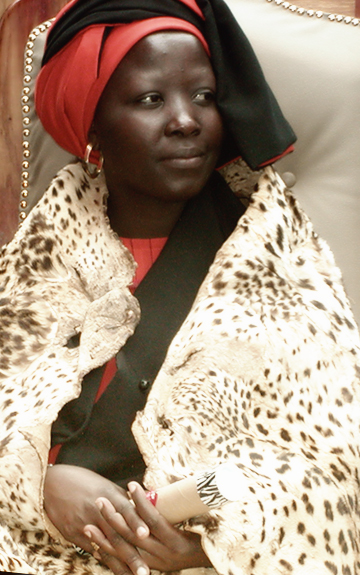
Makobo Caroline Modjadji VI

Rain Queen Makobo Caroline Modjadji VI (22 July 1978 – 12 June 2005) was the sixth in a line of the Balobedu people's Rain Queens. Makobo was crowned on 16 April 2003, at the age of 25, after the death of her predecessor and grandmother, Rain Queen Mokope Modjadji V. This made her the youngest queen in the history of the Balobedu.

Makobo was admitted into the Limpopo Medi-Clinic for an undisclosed illness on 10 June 2005 and died two days later, at the age of 27. The official cause of death was listed as chronic meningitis. She is survived by a son, Prince Lekukela Hex Modjadji (b. 1997), and a daughter, Masalanabo Modjadji VII (b. 20 January 2005), the latter of whom became qualified to succeed her in 2023 when she turned 18. Prince Lekukela Modjadji has voiced strong opposition to the recognition of his sister as the queen, which has caused deep discontent between the Modjadji royal family and the Motshekga family that helped raise Masalanabo. Despite this royal drama, President Cyril Ramaphosa legally recognised her as queen of the Balobedu.

== Succession ==
The Rain Queen's official mates are chosen by the Royal Council, so that all of her children will be of dynastic status, from which future Rain Queens may descend. However, the Rain Queens are not expected to remain in exclusive relations with these partners. In the past, the Rain Queen was allowed to have children only by her close relatives.

Perhaps uniquely, the Balobedu crown descends according to matrilineal primogeniture: her eldest daughter is always her successor, so the title of Rain Queen is normally passed from mother to daughter. It is said that she ingests poison when she is near death so that her daughter will assume the crown more quickly. Lately, however, many traditions have been abandoned, influenced by Christian missionaries.

The government of South Africa recognized Princess Masalanabo as the future Rain Queen in a 2016 memorandum and she was expected to officially receive her certificate in 2021, when she turned 18, as minors are not allowed to be traditional leaders. Makobo's brother Prince Mpapatla was designated regent for Princess Masalanabo. However, Mpapatla himself has a daughter by his cousin, a woman from the royal Modjadji line. Mpapatla, however, has insisted that his late sister's daughter, Princess Masalanabo, will be enthroned as the queen when she turns 18.

However, in May 2021, a faction of the Modjadji Royal Council appointed Masalanabo's older half-brother, Prince Lekukela, as king of the Balobedu nation with the support of Prince Regent Mpapatla, citing Masalanabo's lack of preparation on divine processes traditionally assumed by Rain Queens, as she lived in Gauteng with the family of Mathole Motshekga, a former advisor to the Balobedu Royal Council. Mpapatla claimed there was a 2006 Royal Council resolution appointing Lekukela as heir to the Balobedu throne, which was allegedly kept secret due to security concerns. The Royal Council planned for Princess Masalanabo to instead assume the position of khadi-kholo (great aunt, or princess royal) of the Balobedu kingdom. Lekukela was installed as king-elect by the Modjadji royal council in October 2022, although his coronation was still pending judicial approval after a court application was submitted by Princess Masalanabo's legal team in order to challenge the Royal Council's decision, which they claimed to be illegal under the Traditional Leadership and Governance Framework Act and to ignore the prior recognition of Masalanabo as Rain Queen by President Cyril Ramaphosa. An online petition against Lekukela's appointment was launched in May 2021, even though the Royal Council stated the decision was irreversible.

A male branch of the extended royal clan has also petitioned the South African president to restore the male line of the Balobedu royal house, which reigned before 1800. This request is considered unlikely to be granted, since the Rain Queen heritage is recognised as a national cultural legacy and interest in it has stimulated significant tourist trade. This male branch is reportedly considered by some to be a faction that promotes division within the royal clan of the Balobedu people.

== List of Rulers of Balobedu ==
1. Rain Queen I Maselekwane Modjadji (1800–1854)
2. Rain Queen II Masalanabo I Modjadji (1854–1894)
3. Rain Queen III Khesetoane Modjadji (1895–1959)
4. Rain Queen IV Makoma Modjadji (1959–1980)
5. Rain Queen V Mokope Modjadji (1981–2001)
6. Rain Queen VI Makobo Modjadji (2003–2005)
7. Prince Regent Mpapatla (2005–2023) – his regency was terminated on 20 January 2023
8. King Lekukela (2022–) – his installation as king in pretense took place in October 2022
9. Rain Queen VII Masalanabo II Modjadji (2023–) – legally recognized in December 2024; her coronation, scheduled for August 2025, was canceled

== In popular culture ==
She: A History of Adventure.

The second Rain Queen, Masalanabo Modjadji, is said to have been the inspiration for H. Rider Haggard's novel She: A History of Adventure. Her office would also serve as the source of the title She-who-must-be-obeyed, which was borne by the book's antagonist Queen Ayesha of Kor and which the subsequent Rain Queens came to receive as an informal subsidiary title as a result.

The Marvel Comics character Storm is a fictional descendant of the dynasty that produces the Rain Queens through the line of the Sorceress Supreme Ayesha from the Hyborian Age. Mujaji is also the name of the goddess of sustenance in The Orisha, the pantheon of Wakanda. In Wakanda, Storm is called Hadari-Yao ("Walker of Clouds" in ancient Alkamite), a goddess who preserves the balance of natural things.

In the 2018 animated television series DuckTales, the character Scrooge McDuck states that he convinced the Rain Queen of Balobedu to make the Sahara Desert less dry in the episode "The Ballad of Duke Baloney".

== See also ==
- Balobedu
- Matrilineality
- Matrilineal succession
- Rainmaking (ritual)
- She (novel)
- The Mysterious Flame of Queen Loana
