= Palabora =

South African public mining company

Palabora Mining Company Limited
- Founded: 1956; 70 years ago
- Headquarters: Phalaborwa, Limpopo, South Africa
- Key people: Guangmin Wei (CEO)
- Website: palabora.com

Palabora, officially Palabora Mining Company Limited, is a South African publicly-traded mining company headquartered in Phalaborwa, Limpopo. The company operates a single cluster of open-pit and underground mines producing mainly copper, as well as byproducts such as precious metals from anode slimes, nickel sulfate, sulfuric acid, magnetite, and vermiculite.

Palabora also has processing facilities on site for the production of purified copper from mined copper ore, and a vermiculite recovery plant. Its final copper product has two forms namely, copper cathode and copper rod.

In addition to its mining activities, Palabora maintains subsidiaries located in the United States, United Kingdom and Singapore for the marketing of vermiculite.

== History ==
Until 2013, Rio Tinto owned 57.7 per cent of Palabora and Anglo American owned 16.8 per cent. In September 2011, both companies announced that they planned to sell their stakes because its copper operation was "no longer of a sufficient scale."

In December 2012, the companies reached a pre-sale agreement to sell their collective 74.5 per cent interest at R110 per share in a deal that valued Palabora at R5.31 billion.

The purchasing consortium was led by a Chinese state-owned entity, the Hebei Iron and Steel Group (35 per cent of the consortium); it also comprised the state-owned South African Industrial Development Corporation (20 per cent), General Nice Development (25 per cent), and Tewoo Group (20 per cent).

== Palabora mine ==
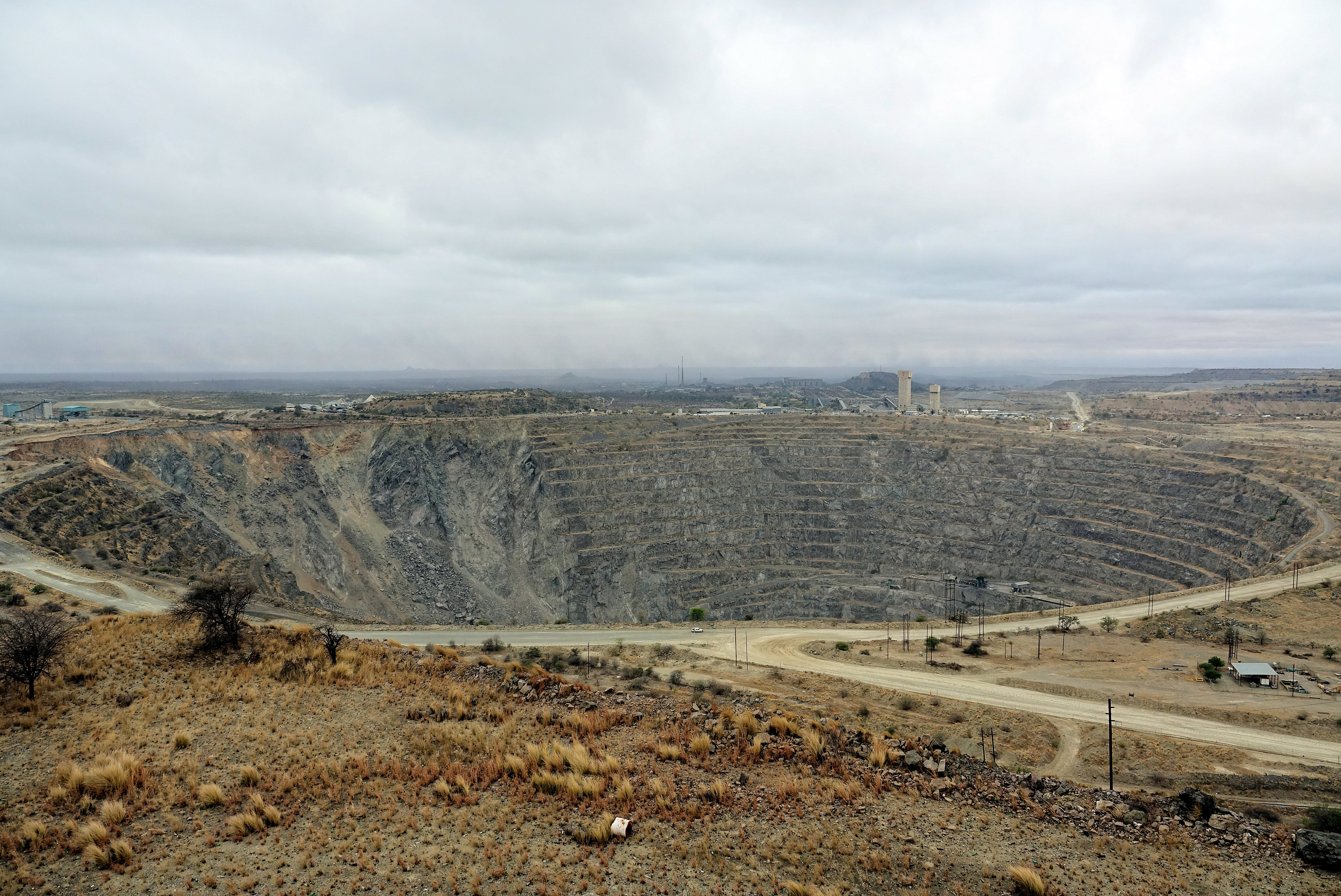
Palabora's now-defunct open pit mine outside Phalaborwa, Limpopo

The Palabora mine was an open-pit operation until 2002, when the pit reached its final economic depth. Mining subsequently began in an underground mine which was constructed between 2001 and 2004. It is the only producing copper mine operating in South Africa, as well as the largest employer in Ba-Phalaborwa.
