= Phalaborwa =

Town in Limpopo, South Africa

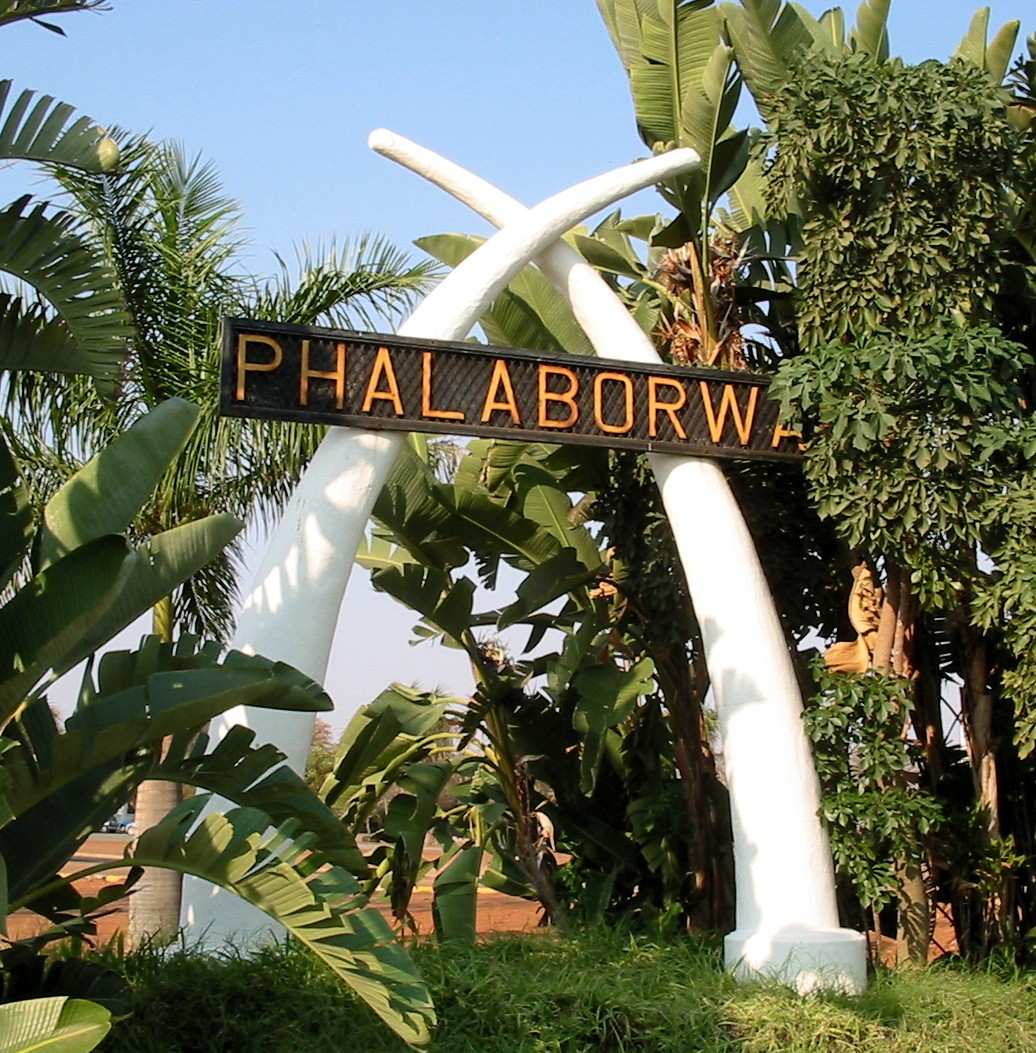
- The entrance sign to Phalaborwa

- Location within Limpopo Location within South Africa
- Coordinates: 23°56′S 31°7′E
- Country: South Africa
- Province: Limpopo
- District: Mopani
- Municipality: Ba-Phalaborwa

Area
  - Total: 193.33 km^{2} (74.65 sq mi)
- Elevation: 437 m (1,434 ft)

Population (2011)
  - Total: 13,108
  - Density: 67.801/km^{2} (175.60/sq mi)

Racial makeup (2011)
  - White: 56.4%
  - Black African: 39.8%
  - Coloured: 1.9%
  - Indian/Asian: 1.5%
  - Other: 0.4%

First languages (2011)
  - Afrikaans: 51%
  - English: 15.1%
  - Tsonga: 11.1%
  - Northern Sotho: 10.8%
  - Other: 12%
- Time zone: UTC+2 (SAST)
- Postal code (street): 1389
- PO box: 1390
- Area code: 015
- Website: Phalaborwa trade and tourism

Phalaborwa (translated to English as better than the south; phala means better than and borwa means south) is a town in the Mopani District Municipality, Limpopo province, South Africa.

== Name ==
The place was called "Phalaborwa" by the Sotho tribes who migrated from the south to the area. The name means "better than the south".

== History ==
Phalaborwa Ga-Malatji the Barwa Sotho tribe mined and smelted copper and iron ore there by 400 AD.

== Geography ==
It is located near the confluence of the Ga-Selati River and the Olifants, halfway up along the western border of the Kruger National Park in the Lowveld.

It is the only town in South Africa that borders Kruger National Park. The border with Mozambique is two hours away. Various private game reserves nearly surround Phalaborwa. Hans Merensky Golf Estate is situated on the outskirts.

Nearby natural attractions are Blyde River Canyon, the Three Rondavels, God's Window and Bourke's Luck Potholes; the Tzaneen fruit farms and Hoedspruit game farms can all be visited within a day.

Masorini near Phalaborwa gate, is a reconstructed Ba-Phalaborwa hill village, with huts, grain storage areas, and an iron smelting site.

== Economy ==
=== Mining ===
Phalaborwa is home to Palabora Mining. The massive open pit mine, nearly 2,000 meters across, is Africa's widest manmade hole. Founded in 1951, Foskor's Mining Division in Phalaborwa mines phosphate rock (foskorite and pyroxenite), from which Foskor's Acid Division in Richards Bay produces phosphoric acid and phosphate-based granular fertilisers for local and international markets. The opencast mine in Phalaborwa, in South Africa's Limpopo Province, has the capacity to yield 2.6 million tons per annum of phosphate rock concentrate from processing 35 million tons of ore per annum. Once crushed, milled, concentrated and dried, most of the phosphate rock concentrate is railed to Foskor's processing plant in Richards Bay, 800 km away on the country's east coast.

=== Tourism ===
Tourism and wildlife play a dominant role in the economy.

== Transport ==
Phalaborwa Airport is a commercial airport serving the town.

== Notable people ==
- Dale Steyn: South African cricketer
- Ryan Coetzee: Swimmer who won a bronze medal at the 2018 Commonwealth Games
- Pule Mabe: Politician
- Pule Shayi: Politician
- Mandla Mashimbyi: Proteas Women National Cricket Coach
- Ethy Mbhalati: South African Cricketer

== Climate ==
This area is also known as the Valley of the Olifants. Rainfall is low. It has the highest winter temperature in South Africa, with an average winter temperature range from 9 °C to 26 °C.During summer the average temperatures vary from 20 °C to 45 °C with occasional heavy rainfall. The highest recorded temperature was 50 °C in December 2018.

Climate data for Phalaborwa
| Month | Jan | Feb | Mar | Apr | May | Jun | Jul | Aug | Sep | Oct | Nov | Dec | Year |
|---|---|---|---|---|---|---|---|---|---|---|---|---|---|
| Mean daily maximum °C (°F) | 34 (93) | 33 (91) | 32 (90) | 30 (86) | 29 (84) | 27 (81) | 26 (79) | 28 (82) | 31 (88) | 32 (90) | 32 (90) | 33 (91) | 33 (91) |
| Daily mean °C (°F) | 26.5 (79.7) | 26 (79) | 25 (77) | 23 (73) | 20 (68) | 18 (64) | 17.5 (63.5) | 19 (66) | 22 (72) | 23 (73) | 24 (75) | 26 (79) | 22 (72) |
| Mean daily minimum °C (°F) | 21 (70) | 21 (70) | 20 (68) | 17 (63) | 12 (54) | 10 (50) | 9 (48) | 11 (52) | 14 (57) | 17 (63) | 19 (66) | 21 (70) | 16 (61) |
| Average precipitation mm (inches) | 97 (3.8) | 81 (3.2) | 65 (2.6) | 25 (1.0) | 12 (0.5) | 4 (0.2) | 7.5 (0.30) | 7 (0.3) | 21 (0.8) | 46 (1.8) | 69 (2.7) | 96 (3.8) | 529 (20.8) |
