= Ba-Phalaborwa Local Municipality =

Coordinates: 23°55′S 30°50′E

Ba-Phalaborwa
- Local municipality
- Seal

- Location in Limpopo
- Country: South Africa
- Province: Limpopo
- District: Mopani
- Seat: Phalaborwa
- Wards: 18

Government
  - Type: Municipal council
  - Mayor: Merriam Malatji (ANC)

Area
  - Total: 7,462 km^{2} (2,881 sq mi)

Population (2011)
  - Total: 150,637
  - Density: 20.19/km^{2} (52.28/sq mi)

Racial makeup (2011)
  - Black African: 93.10%
  - Coloured: 0.3%
  - Indian/Asian: 0.2%
  - White: 6.4%

First languages (2011)
  - Tsonga: 47.7%
  - Sotho: 38.1%
  - Afrikaans: 5.1%
  - Sotho: 2.8%
  - Other: 6.3%
- Time zone: UTC+2 (SAST)
- Municipal code: LIM334

Ba-Phalaborwa Municipality (Northern Sotho: Mmasepala wa Ba-Phalaborwa; Tsonga: Masipala wa Ba-Phalaborwa) is a local municipality within the Mopani District Municipality, in the Limpopo province of South Africa. The seat is Phalaborwa.

== Main places ==
The 2011 census divided the municipality into the following main places:

Place	Code	Area (km^{2})	Population	Most spoken language	Ga-Makhushane	963012	9.92	13,499	Northern Sotho
Ga-Mashishimale	963014	13,920	13.35	Northern Sotho					
Ga-Selwana	963014	4.65	5,263	Northern Sotho					
Ga-Maseke	963015	4.86	2,752	Northern Sotho					
Namakgale	963011	12.97	36,365	Northern Sotho					
Boelang	963016	0.43	291	Northern Sotho					

== Politics ==
The municipal council consists of thirty-seven members elected by mixed-member proportional representation. Nineteen councillors are elected by first-past-the-post voting in nineteen wards, while the remaining eighteen are chosen from party lists so that the total number of party representatives is proportional to the number of votes received. In the election of 1 November 2021 the African National Congress (ANC) won a majority of twenty-four seats on the council. The following table shows the results of the election.

Party	Ward			List			Total seats
Party	Votes	%	Seats	Votes	%	Seats	Total seats
African National Congress	18,906	59.45	17	19,777	62.86	7	24
Economic Freedom Fighters	3,893	12.24	0	4,353	13.84	5	5
Democratic Alliance	3,069	9.65	2	3,157	10.03	2	4
National Independent Party	1,491	4.69	0	1,513	4.81	2	2
Mopani Independent Movement	978	3.08	0	1,036	3.29	1	1
Independent candidates	2,003	6.30	0				0
Freedom Front Plus	308	0.97	0	359	1.14	1	1
Able Leadership	226	0.71	0	224	0.71	0	0
African Christian Democratic Party	190	0.60	0	222	0.71	0	0
Congress of the People	163	0.51	0	144	0.46	0	0
Forum for Service Delivery	139	0.44	0	105	0.33	0	0
African People's Convention	121	0.38	0	112	0.36	0	0
Civic Warriors	98	0.31	0	74	0.24	0	0
United Democratic Movement	69	0.22	0	100	0.32	0	0
Abantu Batho Congress	85	0.27	0	80	0.25	0	0
Ximoko Party	36	0.11	0	57	0.18	0	0
Inkatha Freedom Party	4	0.01	0	55	0.17	0	0
African Transformation Movement	11	0.03	0	38	0.12	0	0
Azanian People's Organisation	1	0.00	0	33	0.10	0	0
Patriotic Alliance	10	0.03	0	22	0.07	0	0
Total	31,801	100.00	19	31,461	100.00	18	37
Valid votes	31,801	97.85		31,461	97.60		
Invalid/blank votes	699	2.15		772	2.40		
Total votes	32,500	100.00		32,233	100.00		
Registered voters/turnout	75,415	43.09		75,415	42.74		
