= Civic Warriors of Maruleng =

Political party in South Africa

- Leader: Poopo Mohlabe
- Founder: Mapampule Hendrick Shai
- Ideology: Agrarianism
- National Assembly seats: 0 / 400
- Provincial Legislatures: 0 / 430

Website
- www.facebook.com/Civic-Warriors-of-Maruleng-992867840872042/

The Civic Warriors of Maruleng (CWM) is a political party based in Limpopo, South Africa.

The party won three seats in Maruleng Local Municipality in the 2016 municipal local elections, running on a platform of rural development and combating crime and corruption.

The party has highlighted numerous acts of corruption in Maruleng. In January 2018, the Civic Warriors of Maruleng highlighted a case where the municipality was renting a single waste removal truck for R500 000 a month.

It is contesting the 2019 general election in Limpopo province only.

== Murder of Mapampole Hendrick Shai ==
Party president Mapampole Hendrick Shai was murdered outside Naphuno Magistrate’s Court in February 2017. He was to appear in court charged with taxi violence at the time, and it is believed the attack was an act of vengeance. Shai's cousin, Jeffrey Morema, stated that Shai was a committed community activist, and believed the murder was carried out by those "petrified of his new political party".

== Election results ==
=== Provincial elections ===
Election	Eastern Cape		Free State		Gauteng		Kwazulu-Natal		Limpopo		Mpumalanga		North-West		Northern Cape		Western Cape	
Election	%	Seats	%	Seats	%	Seats	%	Seats	%	Seats	%	Seats	%	Seats	%	Seats	%	Seats
2019	-	-	-	-	-	-	-	-	0.14%	0/49	-	-	-	-	-	-	-	-

=== Municipal elections ===
Election	Votes	%
2016	8,536	0.02%
