= Lobedu people =

Southern African ethnic group

BaLobedu people
Balobedu

Regions with significant populations
- Limpopo, Tzaneen

Languages
- First language Khelobedu; Second language English, Sepedi, and other South African Bantu Languages like The Barolong Language.

Religion
- Christianity, African traditional religion

Related ethnic groups
- Sotho-Tswana peoples • Lozi people • Sotho people • Pedi people • Venda people • Tswana people

Lobedu
- Person: Molobedu
- People: Balobedu
- Language: Khelobedu
- Country: Bolobedu

The Lobedu or Balobedu (also known as the BaLozwi or Bathobolo) are a southern African ethnic group that speak a Northern Sotho dialect called Khelobedu. Their area is called Bolobedu. The name "balobedu" means "the mineral miners", lobela or go loba – to mine. Their ancestors were part of the great Mapungubwe early civilization. They have their own kingdom, the Balobedu Kingdom, within the Limpopo Province of South Africa with a female ruler, the Rain Queen Modjadji.

It is estimated that there are around 1 million BaLobedu in South Africa. Their population is found in Greater Letaba Local Municipality (171,011 or 80.4% based on the 2011 census), Greater Tzaneen Local Municipality (200,000 or 46% based on the 2011 census), Ba-Phalaborwa Local Municipality (70,000 or 47% based on the 2011 census), Greater Giyani Local Municipality (20,000 or 6.4% based on the 2011 census), and smaller villages in Limpopo. Some are found in Gauteng province as labour migrants, especially in Tembisa and Alexandra townships.

== Language ==
Their language is known as Lobedu (used here but Khelobedu, KhiLovedu, or Lovedu are equally valid) and is a dialect of Northern Sotho. Mutual intelligibility between certain Venda dialects and the Lobedu language is so high that speakers of these Venda dialects can effectively communicate with Lobedu speakers without difficulty. A Tshiguvhu (a Venda dialect) speaker can understand a Lobedu speaker easily, and vice versa. Lobedu could easily have been classified as a Venda dialect or an independent language. For example, Northern Sotho has higher mutual intelligibility with Southern Sotho and Tswana than it does with Lobedu.

Most Lobedu speakers only learn to speak Pedi at school; as such, Pedi is only a second or third language and is foreign to them, like English and Afrikaans. Lobedu is a written language and its dictionary, Thalusamandzwi Ya Khilovedu, was published in 2018 by Kgothatso Seshayi. The first Lobedu novel, Lekhekhesha, was published in 2018 by Eliya Monyela. The first Lobedu poetry book, Zwireto zwa KheLobedu, was published and launched in 2020 by Lobedu poet Makgwekgwe Waa-Mampeule. As of October 2021, a translation of the Christian Bible is being undertaken by VALODAGOMA NPC (the BaLobedu think tank) and PANSALB (the Pan South African Languages Board).

== Subgroups ==
There are sub-groups of the Lobedu:

- BaLobedu ba Ga-Modjadji, which is the main group of BaLobedu and is led by the Royal House of Modjadji, which is the main royal house for the other groups. The royal house use Warthog as totem. Balobedu ba Ga Modjadji are Kolobe Clan. Mokoto royal family members are part of Modjadji family.
- Balobedu ba ga Rakwadu, they are located in Greater Letaba Municipality. They are Kolobe clan and related to Balobedu ba ga Modjadji. They are ruled by Chief David Nchaupa Mohale. He is Rakwadu V. The founder of the Clan was Chief Rakwadu in 1818. They were forcefully removed from their ancestral land in 1964. Their land was returned in 2024. The land claims was initiated by the current Chief in 1998. He is serving as Chairman of Rakwadu Communal Property Association. Rakwadu CPA is in partnership with Westfalia Fruit.
- Bakgwaname ba ga Tsolobolo- They are ruled by Babirwa Letsoalo Chieftaincy in Kgwaname Modjadjiskloof. Letsoalo Royal Family are Banareng . They use Buffalo as their totem. Bakgwaname are Babirwa and Balobedu people. The clan adopted Letsoalo Royal Family Totem. The clan is under Balobedu Royal Nation. Queen Modjadji she is their Sovereign Ruler under Letsoalo Chieftaincy. People of the clan have different surnames such as Mogale, Maponya, Seshoka, Molope, Mogoboya and Monyela. All these families have their own totems. Mogale are Dikolobe(Warthog) and Maponya are Ditlou(Elephant). The founding Chief of the clan it's Kgoshi Moatle Letsoalo. Kgoshi Moatle killed his Brother Serurubele Letswalo to become Chief of Banareng ba Letswalo. Crown Prince and heir to the throne Podile Letswalo fled to Ga Molepo to his maternal uncle who was a Chief of Molepo Clan. Kgoshi Molepo prepared his army to fight Kgoshi Moatle on behalf of his Nephew. Crown Prince Podile and his Uncle Chief Molepo defeated Kgoshi Moatle Letsoalo who fled to Kgwaname with his family and followers. Kgoshi Podile Letswalo became the ruler of Banareng ba Letswalo Clan. Kgoshi Moatle founded his Clan BaKgwaname in 1825. After Kgoshi Moatle died, his eldest child and daughter Mankaleme Letsoalo became Regent for her young brother. Crown Prince and heir to the throne it was Kgoshi Tsolobolo Letsoalo. When Tsolobolo became the Chief he married his first wife Maite Letsoalo. The second wife and Timamollo was Mmatjawela Mogale. She became Mmasechaba (Mother of the nation) for Tsolobolo Clan. The Royal marriage produced Kgoshi Lesetja Letsoalo (Tsolobolo II). The future Chief became one of the longest reigning Chief in South Africa. He ruled for 80 years. He ruled during the time when Hans Merensky was seizing majority of his land. They are still fighting for their dispossessed land. Regent/Chief Makeke Letsoalo lodged land claim in 1997. Acting Chief is Moatle Letsoalo.
- BaLobedu ba Ga-Sekgopo (BalobGeneral edu Ba Ha Sewhopo), which are located at Ga-Sekgopo Village. They separated from Balobedu ba Modjadji in 1810, when the first female ruler of Balobedu was crowned. The founder of the clan was Sekgopo also known as Koma Mohale. He was son of Mohale and grandson of King Phetole. They are ruled by Queen Kgoshigadi raining Mokgadi Josephine Sekgopo. She is serving as the Regent for her son. She is from Mailula family who are Ndunas for the Royal family. Along with the Maake are the cousins to Sekgopo Royal family.
- BaLobedu ba ga-Mmamaila, which was founded by Prince Mmamaila, the elder brother of Modjadji I, who objected to being ruled by women. He was the 11th son and last born son of the last male rulers of BaLobedu, King Mokoto. This tribe is located around GA-Mamaila seklobolo was amongst the smallest clan with 500 family housed
- Like the Mamabolo Bjatladi took the totem Kolobe by staying amongst dikolobe. The Mamobolo Clan are the descendants of Selwane & Mogashoa who are the Babina Tau ba ga Masemola by origin became dikolobe by staying with dikolobe and adopted the totem Kolobe. See Reference below.

== Origins ==
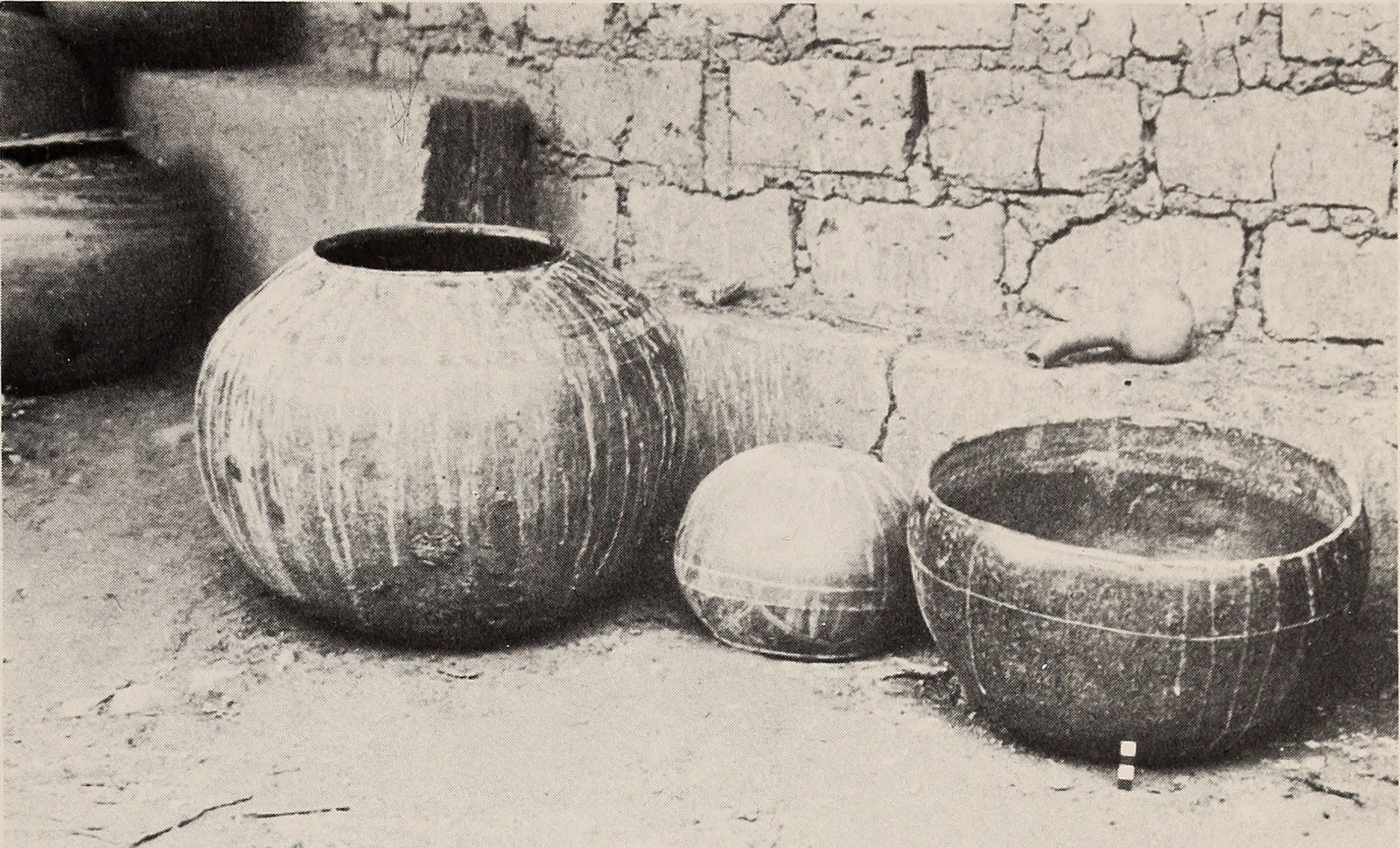
Clay vessels in a Lobedu village, 1975, by which time they were only used for ritual purposes

The Balobedu originally migrated south from present day Zimbabwe to their present location in South Africa. The central Queendom village is Khetlhakone, in the district of Balobedu. These Kalanga migrants consisted of the Mokwebo, who are the ancestors of all wild pig clans (ba ana golove/ba bina kolobe) like Mamabolo Ramafalo and Modjadji, the Nengwekhulu, who are the ancestors of all elephant clans (Ditlou); and the Ramabulana, ancestors of the other elephant clans (Ditlou), who are also uncles of the Nengwekhulus. All BaLobedu are descended from these three groups: BaKwevho, Nengwekhulu, and Ramabulana. The rest of the people are descendants of East Sotho or BaLaudi refugees and indigenous South Venda groups like BaNgona. As a result, the most common animal totems among BaLobedu are the wild pig (Goloe/Kolobe) and the elephant (Dou/Tlou).

The wild pig clans (Dikolobe) are the Modjadji, Mohale, Ramalepe, Modika, Mahasha, Mabulana, Mafa, Mokwebo, Mampeule, Molokwane, Maunatlala, Malepe, Sebela, Thobela, and Ramafalo, all of whom are descendants of the ancient Mokwebo (wild pig) royal house. All Chiefs in Bolobedu are of the wild pig clans, with the exception of the chiefs of Taulome, Malatji, and Rakgoale (Mogoboya), who are Dinoko (porcupines) after running to Bolobedu after difagane wars their traditional dance they brought is Dinaka. The elephant clan is Rabothata, Makgoba, Selowa (Khelowa/Tshilowa/Shilowa), Shai, Matlou (Ma₫ou), Mabulana, and Maenetja; these are the descendants of the ancient royal house of Nengwekhulu. Letsoalo they are Buffalo clan.

== Traditions ==
Balobedu do traditional dances called khekhapa for women and dinaka for men.Sekgapa and Dinaka are traditional dances of Bapedi-speaking people covering such areas as GaSekhukhune, GaDikgale, GaMaake, GaSekororo, and Bolobedu.

Balobedu have a male initiation ceremony called Moroto. The female initiation ceremony is called Dikhopa.

Balobedu have their own way of praising and talking to their God through Dithugula. They sit next to a traditionally designed circle in their homes and start calling the names of their ancestors.

== Traditional rulers ==
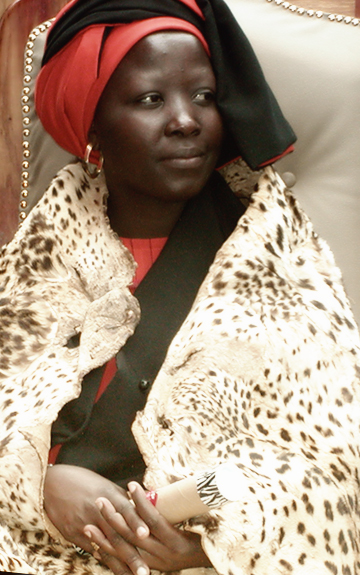
Queen Makobo Modjadji VI

The Lobedu have female rulers known as "Rain Queens". The queen is believed to have the power to make rain. The Balobedu Kingdom consists of a number of small groups tied together by their queen. On 12 June 2005, Queen Makobo Modjadji died, leaving no clear successor acceptable to all members of the Queen's Council. The late queen's brother has served as regent since then.

The area of Balobedu consists of around 150 villages, and every village has a male or female ruler who represents Modjadji, the Rain Queen.

The Rain Queen was historically known as an extremely powerful magician who was able to bring rain to her friends and drought to her enemies. Visitors to the area always brought her gifts and tribute, including cattle and their daughters as wives (though their role is more akin to what those in the Western world would call ladies-in-waiting), to appease her so that she would bring rain to their regions. The name Lobedu is thought to derive from this practice, referring to the daughters or sisters who were lost to their families. The Rain Queen extends her influence through her wives, because they link her politically to other families or villages.

The Rain Queen was referenced in literature as the basis for H. Rider Haggard's novel She.

=== List of rulers of Balobedu ===
Before Balobedu was ruled by Queens. They had 6 male Kings. The last being King Mokoto. The King was ordered by Ancestors to conceive a Queen with his daughter Dzugundini

1. Queen Maselekwane Modjadji I (1800–1854)
2. Queen Masalanabo I Modjadji II (1854–1894)
3. Queen Khesethoane Modjadji III (1895–1959)
4. Queen Makoma Modjadji IV (1959–1988)
5. Queen Mokope Modjadji V (1981–2001)
6. Queen Makobo Modjadji VI (2003–2005)
7. Prince Regent Mpapatla (2005–2023)
8. Contested King Lekukela (2022–)
9. Queen Masalanabo II Modjadji VII (2023–)

== Notable people ==
- Stanley Kgatla, former Platinum Stars defender; born in Ga-Ramotshinyadi village
- Candy Tsa Mandebele, musician
- Lebogang Manyama, Cape Town City FC midfielder
- Andrew Rabutla, former Bafana Bafana and Jomo Cosmos defender; born in Ga-Ramotshinyadi village
- Tebogo Monyai, former Mpumalanga Black Aces F.C., Moroka Swallows and University of Pretoria FC defender; born in Ga-Abel village
- Peta Teanet, born Teanet Peta XiTsonga, a disco musician born and raised in Thapane Village, Bolobedu
- Mathole Motshekga, South African politician and former premier of Gauteng province
- Solly Mapaila, South African politician and leader of the Communist Party, an ally of the ruling party
- Master KG, the Jerusalema song artist
- King Monada, Ska Bora Moreki Hitmaker
- Thabang 'Lij' Mabale , a township business advocate and founder of Tzaneen Fashion Week
- Chief Makgoba
- Thabo Cecil Makgoba, Archbishop of Cape Town
- Evidence Makgopa, soccer player, bronze medalist at 2023 Africa Cup of Nations; born in born in Ga-Mampa village
- Raymond Mdaka, soccer coach, winner of 2025 U-20 Africa Cup of Nations; born in Ga-Mokgwathi village
- Makoma Mohale, actress, played the lead role of Rain Queen in Mzansi Magic cultural drama Queen Modjadji.
