= Greater Letaba Local Municipality =

Local municipality in Limpopo, South Africa

Coordinates: 23°30′S 30°15′E

Greater Letaba
- Local municipality
- Seal

- Location in Limpopo
- Country: South Africa
- Province: Limpopo
- District: Mopani
- Seat: Modjadjiskloof
- Wards: 30

Government
  - Type: Municipal council
  - Mayor: Dagma Mamanyoha

Area
  - Total: 1,891 km^{2} (730 sq mi)

Population (2011)
  - Total: 212,701
  - Density: 112.5/km^{2} (291.3/sq mi)

Racial makeup (2011)
  - Black African: 98.8%
  - Coloured: 0.1%
  - Indian/Asian: 0.1%
  - White: 0.8%

First languages (2011)
  - Northern Sotho: 80.4%
  - Tsonga: 12.6%
  - Sotho: 1.7%
  - Other: 5.3%
- Time zone: UTC+2 (SAST)
- Municipal code: LIM332

Greater Letaba Municipality (Northern Sotho: Mmasepala wa Greater Letaba; Tsonga: Masipala wa Greater Letaba) is a local municipality within the Mopani District Municipality, in the Limpopo province of South Africa. The seat is Modjadjiskloof.

== Main places ==
The 2001 census divided the municipality into the following main places:

Place	Code	Area (km^{2})	Population	Most spoken language
Modjadjiskloof	90201	3.53	1,347	Afrikaans
Mamaila	90203	247.85	39,507	Northern Sotho
Modjadji	90204	723.88	126,504	Northern Sotho
Pheeha	90205	26.04	5,999	Northern Sotho
Sekgopo	90206	31.75	18,517	Northern Sotho
Vuyani	90207	77.95	9,595	Tsonga
Remainder of the municipality	90202	782.40	18,657	Tsonga

== Politics ==
The municipal council consists of sixty members elected by mixed-member proportional representation. Thirty councillors are elected by first-past-the-post voting in thirty wards, while the remaining thirty are chosen from party lists so that the total number of party representatives is proportional to the number of votes received. In the election of 3 August 2016 the African National Congress (ANC) won a majority of forty-six seats on the council. The following table shows the results of the election.

Party	Votes				Seats		
Party	Ward	List	Total	%	Ward	List	Total
ANC	42,671	43,064	85,735	75.6	30	16	46
EFF	8,680	8,860	17,540	15.5	0	9	9
COPE	1,545	1,710	3,255	2.9	0	2	2
DA	1,561	1,590	3,151	2.8	0	2	2
Limpopo Residents Association	634	606	1,240	1.1	0	1	1
Independent	913	–	913	0.8	0	–	0
ACDP	212	236	448	0.4	0	0	0
UDM	158	187	345	0.3	0	0	0
Ximoko Party	142	157	299	0.3	0	0	0
VF+	139	153	292	0.3	0	0	0
PAC	86	114	200	0.2	0	0	0
Total	56,741	56,677	113,418	100.0	30	30	60
Spoilt votes	662	791	1,453				
