= Maruleng Local Municipality =

Coordinates: 24°21′15″S 30°56′50″E

Maruleng
- Local municipality
- Seal

- Location in Limpopo
- Country: South Africa
- Province: Limpopo
- District: Mopani
- Seat: Hoedspruit
- Wards: 14

Government
  - Type: Municipal council
  - Mayor: Thobejane M.H

Area
  - Total: 3,244 km^{2} (1,253 sq mi)

Population (2011)
  - Total: 94,857
  - Density: 29.24/km^{2} (75.73/sq mi)

Racial makeup (2011)
  - Black African: 95.5%
  - Coloured: 0.3%
  - Indian/Asian: 0.2%
  - White: 3.8%

First languages (2011)
  - Northern Sotho: 89.7%
  - Tsonga: 3.9%
  - Afrikaans: 2.7%
  - English: 1.6%
  - Other: 3.6%
- Time zone: UTC+2 (SAST)
- Municipal code: LIM335

Maruleng Municipality (Northern Sotho: Mmasepala wa Maruleng) is a local municipality within the Mopani District Municipality, in the Limpopo province of South Africa. The seat of the municipality is Hoedspruit.

== Main places ==
The 2001 census divided the municipality into the following main places:

Place	Code	Area (km^{2})	Population	Most spoken language
Banereng Ba Letsoalo	92201	122.29	6,752	Northern Sotho
Banereng Ba Sekororo	92202	210.51	35,268	Northern Sotho
Hoedspruit	92203	7.17	2,052	Afrikaans
Letaba	92204	21.58	2,483	Northern Sotho
Mametja	92205	316.08	26,702	Northern Sotho
Naphuno	92207	10.36	8,188	Northern Sotho
Remainder of the municipality	92206	2,543.64	12,929	Tsonga

== Politics ==
The municipal council consists of twenty-seven members elected by mixed-member proportional representation. Fourteen councillors are elected by first-past-the-post voting in fourteen wards, while the remaining thirteen are chosen from party lists so that the total number of party representatives is proportional to the number of votes received. In the election of 1 November 2021 the African National Congress (ANC) won a majority of fifteen seats on the council. The following table shows the results of the election.

Party	Ward			List			Total seats
Party	Votes	%	Seats	Votes	%	Seats	Total seats
African National Congress	15,777	49.94	11	17,922	59.18	4	15
Economic Freedom Fighters	2,973	9.41	0	4,765	15.73	4	4
Independent candidates	6,833	21.63	2				2
Civic Warriors	2,802	8.87	0	3,197	10.56	3	3
Democratic Alliance	2,066	6.54	1	2,728	9.01	1	2
Freedom Front Plus	489	1.55	0	521	1.72	1	1
6 other parties	655	2.07	0	1,152	3.80	0	0
Total	31,595	100.00	14	30,285	100.00	13	27
Valid votes	31,595	98.58		30,285	96.94		
Invalid/blank votes	454	1.42		957	3.06		
Total votes	32,049	100.00		31,242	100.00		
Registered voters/turnout	54,886	58.39		54,886	56.92		

== Corruption ==
In 2018, the Municipal Manager of Maruleng, Sutane Johannes Lethole, was accused of outsourcing the rental of a single truck for waste removal waste removal at R500 000 per month, with a 15% annual escalation. Lethole was also alleged to have increased his own salary to R1.1 million a month, with a cellphone allowance of R2063, without council approval. Lethole resigned after the Democratic Alliance and Civic Warriors of Maruleng brought the corruption to light.

== Geography ==
The Maruleng municipality includes the northern stretches of the Darkensburg mountain range.

Mountains above Mametja in Maruleng Municipality
