= Mopani District Municipality =

Mopani
- District municipality
- Seal

- Location in South Africa
- Coordinates: 23°19′S 30°43′E
- Country: South Africa
- Province: Limpopo
- Seat: Giyani
- Local municipalities: List: Greater Giyani; Greater Letaba; Greater Tzaneen; Ba-Phalaborwa; Maruleng

Government
  - Type: Municipal council
  - Mayor: Pule Shayi

Area
  - Total: 20,011 km^{2} (7,726 sq mi)

Population (2011)
  - Total: 1,092,507
  - Density: 54.595/km^{2} (141.40/sq mi)

Racial makeup (2016)
  - Black African: 97.5%
  - Coloured: 0.2%
  - Indian/Asian: 0.3%
  - White: 2%

First languages (2011)
  - Sepedi: 45.9%
  - Tsonga: 44.3%
  - Sotho: 2.9%
  - Afrikaans: 2.1%
  - Other: 4.8%
- Time zone: UTC+2 (SAST)
- Municipal code: DC33

The Mopani District Municipality (Northern Sotho: Mmasepala wa Selete wa Mopani; Tsonga: Masipala wa Xifundza xa Mopani) is one of the 5 districts of the Limpopo province of South Africa. The seat of the district is Giyani. According to the 2016 Community Survey, it had a population of 1,159,185. The district code is DC33. After the 12th amendment to the Constitution of South Africa, parts of the Bohlabela District Municipality were incorporated into Mopani.

== Geography ==
=== Neighbours ===
Mopani is surrounded by:

- the republic of Mozambique to the east
- Ehlanzeni (DC32) to the south
- Sekhukhune (DC35) to the south-west
- Capricorn (DC35) to the west
- Vhembe (DC34) to the north

=== Local municipalities ===
The district contains the following local municipalities:

Name	Code	Seat	Area (km^{2})	Population (2016)	Dominant language
Ba-Phalaborwa	LIM334	Phalaborwa	7,489	168,937	Tsonga
Greater Giyani	LIM331	Giyani	4,172	256,127	Tsonga
Greater Letaba	LIM332	Modjadjiskloof	1,891	218,030	Pedi
Greater Tzaneen	LIM333	Tzaneen	2,897	416,146	Pedi, Tsonga
Maruleng	LIM335	Hoedspruit	3,563	99,946	Pedi

== Demographics ==
The following statistics are from the Community Survey 2016.

Language	Population	%
Northern Sotho	537,240	46.35%
Tsonga	518,462	44.73%
Sotho	30,646	2.64%
Afrikaans	19,370	1.67%
English	8,349	0.72%
Venda	4,397	0.38%
Zulu	2,029	0.18%
Swati	1,759	0.15%
Xhosa	1,588	0.14%
Tswana	881	0.08%
Khoi, Nama and San	729	0.06%
Ndebele	247	0.02%
Sign	160	0.01%
Other	7,984	0.69%
Not applicable	25,236	2.18%
Not specified	108	0.01%

=== Gender ===
Gender	Population	%
Female	619,612	53.45%
Male	539,574	46.55%

=== Ethnic group ===
Ethnic group	Population	%
Black African	1,130,512	97.53%
White	23,628	2.04%
Indian/Asian	2,918	0.25%
Coloured	2.128	0.18%

=== Age ===
Age	Population	%
0–4	136,331	11.76%
5–9	123,453	10.65%
10–14	105,887	9.13%
15–19	136,808	11.80%
20–24	120,118	10.36%
25–29	108,807	9.39%
30–34	88,778	7.66%
35–39	68,927	5.95%
40–44	59,369	5.12%
45–49	51,785	4.47%
50–54	42,471	3.66%
55–59	34,768	3.00%
60–64	28,875	2.49%
65–69	18,832	1.62%
70–74	14,444	1.25%
75–79	9,147	0.79%
80–84	4,676	0.40%
85–	5,711	0.49%

== Politics ==
=== Election results ===
The following results are for the direct proportional representation election of members of the Mopani District Council on 3 August 2016.

Party	Votes	%
ANC	212,085	74.74%
EFF	35,590	12.54%
DA	19,965	7.04%
APC	4,036	1.42%
COPE	3,212	1.13%
Civic Warriors of Maruleng	2,907	1.02%
ACDP	1,339	0.47%
Ximoko Party	1,289	0.45%
National Independent Party	1,256	0.44%
VF+	868	0.31%
UDM	721	0.25%
PAC	509	0.18%
Total	283,777	
Valid votes	283,777	98.52%
Spoilt votes	4,254	1.48%
Total votes cast	288,031	

== See also ==
- Municipal Demarcation Board
