= Ga-Sebotse =

Ga-Sebotse Pinkie
- Location within Limpopo Location within South Africa
- Coordinates: 23.524°S 28.992°E
- Country: South Africa
- Province: Limpopo
- District: Capricorn
- Municipality: Blouberg

Area
  - Total: 2.32 km^{2} (0.90 sq mi)
- Elevation: 1,086 m (3,563 ft)

Population (2011)
  - Total: 1,702
  - Density: 734/km^{2} (1,900/sq mi)

Racial makeup (2011)
  - Black African: 100.0%

First languages (2011)
  - Northern Sotho: 96.8%
  - Other: 3.2%
- Time zone: UTC+2 (SAST)
- Postal code (street): 0748
- Area code: +27 (0)15

Ga-Sebotse, also known as Pinkie and sometimes Pinkie-Sebotse, is a large village in Ga-Matlala in the Blouberg Local Municipality of the Capricorn District Municipality of the Limpopo province of South Africa. It is located 73 km northwest of Polokwane and 37 km southwest of Senwabarwana.

== History ==
The land the village is built upon was formerly the property of two separate white-owned farms, namely Pinkie and Lucy's Own. Both farms were bought by the Matlala chiefdom after they had been released for ownership by natives. Lucy's Own laid the foundation of Ga-Sebotse - a name which now extends to nearly half of Pinkie - while the remainder of the latter is still exclusively known as Pinkie. The division continues to this day with most of the households on the eastern portion of the road to Mamehlabe recognizing Ntona Manamela as their traditional leader while those on the western portion and Lucy's Own recognize Ntona Chokwe.

== Demographics ==
An overwhelming majority of the villagers' ethnicity is black African, with a small minority of South Asian, Ethiopian and Somalian shop-owners and mixed-race offspring, mostly young children. The main language spoken is Northern Sotho (the Sepedi dialect). Xitsonga, Amharic, Somali and Urdu are the main prominent minority languages. The dominant religion is Christianity, although it is currently facing a minor challenge from the newly introduced religion of Islam. Traditional beliefs are also prevalent. Zimbabweans and Mozambicans form the largest immigrant community in the settlement.

== Employment ==
There is a high rate of unemployment in Ga-Sebotse mainly due to the lack of infrastructure and the main urban centres of the province are located far away from the settlement. Another factor is that the Blouberg municipality is a rural municipality. However, residents of the village have also benefitted from the development of the Tibani Shopping Centre through employment opportunities, shopping and banking services. The new shopping centre is located in Tibane, about 16 km southeast.

== Education ==
- Noko Secondary School It is now defunct and its properties house the Rethusheng Special School.
- Nare-Mohlalerwa Primary School
- Pinkie-Sebotse Crèche, previously known as Lesibana Pre-School
- Kwena Pulana Crèche

There is no institution of higher learning in Ga-Sebotse. The majority of successful matriculants opt for the University of Limpopo's Turfloop Campus to further their studies, while others opt for universities based in Gauteng.

== Infrastructure ==
Although there has been a great deal of development since 1994, there is still much to be done in terms of service delivery. Electricity was first introduced in 2006 and piped running water became available in 2011. The road from Mamehlabe to Ga-Lamola (Rosenkrantz) was to be tarred in a project set for 2013 but failed to yield the much anticipated results. The constructed tarred road that was runs for a few kilometers and is of poor quality. A recreation facility, Pinkie-Sebotse Sports Centre, has been unveiled but it is largely unused and poorly maintained. Other infrastructure still needed in the village includes a post office, telecommunication towers, sports and recreation facilities.

== Sports ==
Football (Soccer) is the most popular sport in Ga-Sebotse. There are three football clubs, which are:

- Pinkie Roman F.C.
- Majane F.C.
- Wanderers F.C. - now defunct and its field has been divided into private homes.

Netball is most popular among teenage girls and young women. However, currently, the netball teams in the village are defunct. It is not clear as to what exactly led to this occurrence.
