= Ga-Ngwetsana =

Ga-Ngwetšana Ceres
- Location within Limpopo Location within South Africa
- Coordinates: 23.685°S 29.146°E
- Country: South Africa
- Province: Limpopo
- District: Capricorn
- Municipality: Polokwane

Area
  - Total: 2.77 km^{2} (1.07 sq mi)
- Elevation: 1,089 m (3,573 ft)

Population (2011)
  - Total: 2,003
  - Density: 723/km^{2} (1,870/sq mi)

Racial makeup (2011)
  - Black African: 99.8%
  - White: 0.1%

First languages (2011)
  - Northern Sotho: 95.5%
  - S. Ndebele: 1.2%
  - English: 1.0%
  - Other: 2.2%
- Time zone: UTC+2 (SAST)
- Postal code (street): 0748
- Area code: +27 (0)15

Ga-Ngwetšana, also known as Ceres, is a large village in Moletši in the Polokwane Local Municipality of the Capricorn District Municipality in the Limpopo province of the Republic of South Africa. It is located about 45 km northwest of the City of Polokwane on the R567 road.

== Demographics ==
Northern Sotho (locally referred to as Sepedi) is the dominant language of the village, with IsiNdebele and English being the most significant minority languages. Sub-Saharan Africans are the main ethnicity of the settlement. Religions of the village include Christianity, African Traditional Religion, Islam and a few East Asian belief systems.

== Infrastructure ==
The residential area of village is situated south of the R567 road which connects Sešego in the east to Tibane and the N11 road in the west. The village is also linked to WF Knobel Hospital which lies a mere 3 km north by Knobel Road. The municipal headquarters of the Aganang Local Municipality (now dissolved) were located in the settlement. The local CBD has a wide range of businesses and services.

== Education ==
- Ceres Primary School
- Mmaditšhika Primary School
- Seokeng Secondary School
