= Juno, Limpopo =

Juno
- Location within Limpopo Location within South Africa
- Coordinates: 23.623°S 29.025°E
- Country: South Africa
- Province: Limpopo
- District: Capricorn
- Municipality: Polokwane

Area
  - Total: 1.56 km^{2} (0.60 sq mi)
- Elevation: 1,086 m (3,563 ft)

Population (2011)
  - Total: 1,301
  - Density: 834/km^{2} (2,160/sq mi)

Racial makeup (2011)
  - Black African: 99.8%
  - Indian/Asian: 0.2%

First languages (2011)
  - Northern Sotho: 98.5%
  - Other: 1.5%
- Time zone: UTC+2 (SAST)
- Postal code (street): 0748
- PO box: 0748
- Area code: +27 (0)15

Juno is a village in Ga-Matlala in the Polokwane Local Municipality of the Capricorn District Municipality of the Limpopo province of South Africa. It is located a mere 1,5 km northeast of Tibane on the R567 road.

== Education ==
- Maduma Primary School.
- Mmankogaedupe Secondary School.
