= Mapiti Matsena =

South African politician (1966–2020)

Member of the Gauteng Provincial Legislature
- In office 22 May 2019 – 15 July 2020

Personal details
- Born: 17 July 1966 Pretoria; Transvaal, South Africa
- Died: 15 July 2020 (aged 53) Doornpoort, Pretoria; Gauteng, South Africa
- Resting place: Ga-Madikana, Limpopo
- Party: African National Congress

Mapiti David Matsena (17 July 1966 – 15 July 2020) was a South African politician who represented the African National Congress (ANC) in the Gauteng Provincial Legislature from May 2019 until July 2020, when he was murdered by a former employee. A lawyer by training, Matsena rose to political prominence through the ANC Youth League. From 2011 to 2018, he was the Deputy Regional Chairperson of the ANC in Tshwane, where he was also a local councillor. He was a member of the ANC's Provincial Executive Committee in Gauteng from 2018 until his death.

== Life and career ==
Matsena was born on 17 July 1966 in Pretoria in the former Transvaal (present-day Gauteng). His family is from Ga-Madikana, a village outside Bochum in present-day Limpopo province. He attended secondary school nearby, in Molemole, where he became involved in anti-apartheid activism through the Congress of South African Students and Mohodi Youth Congress. He qualified and practised as a lawyer.

After the African National Congress (ANC) was unbanned in 1990, Matsena joined the ANC Youth League. He rose through the league's ranks, holding leadership positions in its local branch in Atteridgeville, Pretoria from 1991 to 1996 and then in its regional branch in Pretoria from 1997 to 2004. Simultaneously he became involved in the mainstream ANC, holding various leadership positions in the party's Pretoria Central branch from 1996 to 2009. In 2009, he was elected to the Regional Executive Committee of the ANC's broader regional branch in Tshwane. He also represented the ANC as a councillor in the City of Tshwane from 2010.

In October 2011, he was elected Deputy Regional Chairperson of the ANC in Tshwane, serving under Regional Chairperson Kgosientso Ramokgopa. He and Ramokgopa were re-elected for a second term in October 2014. According to the Sunday Times, by 2016, Matsena was engaged in a factional struggle with Ramokgopa. Ahead of the 2016 local elections, Matsena was a frontrunner to succeed Ramokgopa as Mayor of Tshwane; he was ranked first on a list of three candidates nominated by the Tshwane ANC to stand as the party's mayoral candidate. However, more senior party bodies overruled the Tshwane ANC, rejecting the list and selecting Thoko Didiza as a compromise candidate; the decision led to violent protests in Tshwane.

At the next party elective conference in Tshwane in July 2018, Matsena did not stand for re-election as ANC Regional Deputy Chairperson and was succeeded by Aaron Maluleka. However, later that month, Matsena was elected to a four-year term on the Provincial Executive Committee of the ANC in Gauteng; by number of votes received, he was ranked 14th of the 30 candidates elected. In the 2019 general election, he was elected to a seat in the Gauteng Provincial Legislature, ranked 12th on the ANC's provincial party list.

== Personal life and death ==
Mapiti David Matsena was married to Mmatema Matsena; they had two sons and a daughter. He was stabbed to death at his home in Doornpoort, Pretoria on the evening of 15 July 2020. He was declared dead at the scene, having been stabbed 11 times in his bedroom. He was buried in Ga-Madikana, Limpopo on 24 July 2020.

A suspect, Monoko Francis Thoko, was arrested on 17 July in Ga-Madikana. In April 2021, appearing in the Gauteng High Court, Thoko pled guilty to murder and housebreaking. In his plea, he said that he had been employed by Matsena in January 2019 to do gardening at the Doornport house and to care for Matsena's disabled son. He had resigned in 2020 after a verbal altercation with Matsena's sister and had subsequently entered into a prolonged dispute with Matsena, during which he said Matsena had refused to return his personal possessions and had ultimately physically assaulted him. He said that he had gone to Matsena's home on 15 July, entering through an unlocked door, "to take revenge by confronting the deceased and to show him he could not treat people like that". Thoko was sentenced to an effective 30 years' imprisonment, with a 12-year sentence for housebreaking and a 25-year sentence for murder run concurrently.
