= Ga-Mabotha =

Mmorokgong Schoongezicht
- Location within Limpopo Location within South Africa
- Coordinates: 23.340°S 29.046°E
- Country: South Africa
- Province: Limpopo
- District: Capricorn
- Municipality: Blouberg

Area
  - Total: 2.78 km^{2} (1.07 sq mi)
- Elevation: 1,086 m (3,563 ft)

Population (2011)
  - Total: 2,246
  - Density: 808/km^{2} (2,090/sq mi)

Racial makeup (2011)
  - Black African: 99.9%

First languages (2011)
  - Northern Sotho: 96.5%
  - Other: 3.5%
- Time zone: UTC+2 (SAST)
- Postal code (street): 0790
- Area code: +27 (0)15

Mmorokgong (formerly called Schoongezicht under the Chieftaincy of Ngoepe clan) is a large village in Ga-Matlala in the Blouberg Local Municipality of the Capricorn District Municipality in the Limpopo province of South Africa. It located about 12 km southwest of the town of Senwabarwana.

== Education ==
- Schoongezicht Secondary School.
- Mamadisha Primary School
