= Ngwanallela =

- Location within Limpopo Location within South Africa
- Coordinates: 23.519°S 28.932°E
- Country: South Africa
- Province: Limpopo
- District: Capricorn
- Municipality: Blouberg

Area
  - Total: 1.60 km^{2} (0.62 sq mi)
- Elevation: 1,091 m (3,579 ft)

Population (2011)
  - Total: 1,387
  - Density: 867/km^{2} (2,250/sq mi)

Racial makeup (2011)
  - Black African: 99.9%
  - Indian/Asian: 0.1%

First languages (2011)
  - Northern Sotho: 96.0%
  - Tsonga: 1.9%
  - Other: 2.2%
- Time zone: UTC+2 (SAST)
- Postal code (street): 0748
- Area code: +27 (0)15

Ngwanallela (formerly called Ambergate) is a village in Ga-Matlala in the Blouberg Local Municipality of the Capricorn District Municipality of the Limpopo province of South Africa. It is located about 19 km northwest of Tibane and 40 km east of Steilloopbrug.

== Education ==
- Ambergate Primary School
- Ngwanallela High School

== Sports ==
- Masea F.C.
- Ngwanallela All-Stars F.C.
- Magoši F.C.
