= Burgerregt =

- Location within Limpopo Location within South Africa
- Coordinates: 22.992°S 28.955°E
- Country: South Africa
- Province: Limpopo
- District: Capricorn
- Municipality: Blouberg

Area
  - Total: 2.11 km^{2} (0.81 sq mi)

Population (2011)
  - Total: 1,641
  - Density: 778/km^{2} (2,010/sq mi)

Racial makeup (2011)
  - Black African: 99.9%
  - Indian/Asian: 0.1%

First languages (2011)
  - Northern Sotho: 96.3%
  - Other: 3.7%
- Time zone: UTC+2 (SAST)

Burgerregt is a town in Capricorn District Municipality in the Limpopo province of South Africa.
