= R567 (South Africa) =

Regional route in South Africa

Regional route R567

Route information
- Length: 75 km (47 mi)

Major junctions
- West end: N11 near Lekhureng
- R101 in Polokwane
- East end: R37 in Polokwane

Location
- Country: South Africa

Highway system
- Numbered routes of South Africa
| ← R566 | → R568 |

The R567 is a Regional Route in South Africa.

== Route ==
Its northwestern origin is from the N11 approximately 60 kilometres north of Mokopane (just south of Lekhureng). It runs southeast through Tibane and Ga-Ngwetsana to reach Polokwane, where it passes through Seshego before bypassing Greenside, Westenburg and the Polokwane CBD to meet the R101 (Thabo Mbeki Street) and reach its end at an intersection with the R37 (Church Street) south of the CBD.
