= Indermark =

Indermark (Ga-Letlalo)
- Location within Limpopo Location within South Africa
- Coordinates: 23.080°S 29.105°E
- Country: South Africa
- Province: Limpopo
- District: Capricorn
- Municipality: Blouberg

Area
  - Total: 6.19 km^{2} (2.39 sq mi)

Population (2011)
  - Total: 8,434
  - Density: 1,360/km^{2} (3,530/sq mi)

Racial makeup (2011)
  - Black African: 99.7%
  - Indian/Asian: 0.1%
  - Other: 0.1%

First languages (2011)
  - Northern Sotho: 94.1%
  - Venda: 1.3%
  - Other: 4.5%
- Time zone: UTC+2 (SAST)
- Postal code (street): 0717
- PO box: 0717
- Area code: 015

Indermark is a village in the Capricorn District Municipality in the Limpopo province of South Africa. The village is situated in the Blouberg Local Municipality.

The settlement is approximately 89 km north-west of Polokwane, on the route to Vivo.

== Railways ==
Indermark lacks a railway connection, although there is interest in establishing one to transport food to Johannesburg and elsewhere. Agricultural produce from the area, including tomatoes, bananas and avocados, is transported by freight rail.

== Demographics ==
In 2011, the village had a population of 8,434 across 2,249 households. Of this population, 40.3% of people were aged 0-14, 52.2% aged 15-64, and 7.6% aged 65 and over.

Group	Percentage
Black African	99.7%
Coloured	0%
Indian/Asian	0.1%
White/European	0%
Other	0.1%
