= Ga-Mahoai =

- Location within Limpopo Location within South Africa
- Coordinates: 23.715°S 29.025°E
- Country: South Africa
- Province: Limpopo
- District: Capricorn
- Municipality: Polokwane

Area
  - Total: 1.44 km^{2} (0.56 sq mi)
- Elevation: 1,086 m (3,563 ft)

Population (2011)
  - Total: 2,058
  - Density: 1,430/km^{2} (3,700/sq mi)

Racial makeup (2011)
  - Black African: 99.6%
  - Coloured: 0.2%
  - Indian/Asian: 0.2%

First languages (2011)
  - Northern Sotho: 94.6%
  - Zulu: 1.8%
  - Other: 3.6%
- Time zone: UTC+2 (SAST)
- Postal code (street): 0748
- Area code: +27 (0)15

Ga-Mahoai is a large village in Ga-Matlala in the Polokwane Local Municipality of the Capricorn District Municipality of the Limpopo province of South Africa. It is located 49 km northwest of Polokwane.

== Naming of the village ==
The village was born from a combination of three tribal villages during the BK Matlala era. between 1965 and 1973 the then king, Bk Matlala, had ordered the people from his bantu stands to move into lines and form villages with streets in between. This created the modern villages that are there. Due to this reason three tribal chiefs being Mahoai, Maremane and Nong came together to form the now village named ga-Mahoai. This led to a big controversy in the naming of the village, the other parties were not happy with the naming of the village as Mahoai, which was a name of one chief, rather the community came into unison and named the village Sedibasephale, of which the name never took precedence and the name Ga-Mahoai which was already popular amongst the community members took center stage.

A suggestion was presented to divide the villages into six sections named Mohwere, Mokopeng, Dilepeng, Dithaing, Tsikitsa park, Hlala mpsa. A few streets would also go on to have names, the most popular being Rose drive followed by strata sa di bus and then strata sa mashemo. However, not much emphasis was put into place to modernize the village in that manner.

The Chief Mahoai always had more community members falling under him, followed by Nong and then Maremane. The main reason was that Mahoai ruled over a diverse family names, mostly from the nearby chief Moloto in moletjie, making his tribe a heaven for different people who were looking for a new start in life whilst other chiefs would in house close family names and so their population would not grow rapidly as that of ntona Mahoai.

The most common surnames to find around the villages are Mabe, Moutlana, Nong, Dibete, Ramolefo, Morulane, komape, laka, langa, teffo, pete.

== Schools ==
Unlike many other surrounding villages, the community of Ga-Mahoai decided to build their own schools, an idea not popular at the time but then a primary school Rachebole was built by the community, without any intervention from the government. Those who build the school would pay small fees towards the building and should it happen that a family didn't have money to contribute towards the building, they were also invited to contribute through labor but still many other members preferred not to participate towards the projects and preferred that their kids should commune 4 to 5 km to Bakone or ga Ramalapa for their schooling needs. A poor decision that would affect the growth of the village later on. However, that would not stop the community to erect one of the best high schools later on. In 1986 the community opened a new high school named Mahoai high school, a prominent leader in achieving high education standards in the province. Producing great learners who would go on to become doctors and engineers, making the village one of the fastest and well developing villages around ga Matlala.

== Water sources ==
The climate is usually dry with minimum rainfall between the months of October to April, due the flat landscape, the river shared between ga-Mahoai and ramalapa village is usually dry, making the water source a valuable entity. Due to its slope, underground water source are usually found in the west of the village towards the grave side but then the water is a bit salty in comparison to water found in the middle or up hill the village. Villagers used to use petse, the well as their water source, however with the introduction of boreholes, many migrated to borehole water in their homes although this seemed a bit expensive for some families. Water has always been a huge problem for the village.

== Economic activity ==
The community has always been a group of subsistent farmers, they would feed from the ground they lived on, planting maize in the summer months and combining that with animal farming. A few business were opened in the past, they went on to achieve great success in the village.

Stores such as pete cash store, cholo's shop, ga pitjeng, ga dibete were the first stores in the village, but with time they worn out and many could not stand the competition from the new spaza shops that came later; however the spaza shops also would not survive the competition with the Pakistanis, leaving the economy out of the hands of the villagers. Today the economy is but dead, with no money exchanging hands within the community as there are no resources to sell but rather the money has to come from outside the village and get used there.

== Education ==
- Ratšhebole Primary School
- Mahoai Secondary School
- Nakedi day care center
