= Ga-Lamola =

Rosenkrantz Village
- Location within Limpopo Location within South Africa
- Coordinates: 23.495°S 28.996°E
- Country: South Africa
- Province: Limpopo
- District: Capricorn
- Municipality: Blouberg

Area
  - Total: 2.73 km^{2} (1.05 sq mi)
- Elevation: 1,086 m (3,563 ft)

Population (2011)
  - Total: 533
  - Density: 195/km^{2} (506/sq mi)

Racial makeup (2011)
  - Black African: 100.0%

First languages (2011)
  - Northern Sotho: 96.8%
  - Other: 3.2%
- Time zone: UTC+2 (SAST)
- Postal code (street): 0748
- Area code: +27 (0)15

Rosenkrantz Farm, is a sparsely populated village in Ga-Matlala in the Blouberg Local Municipality of the Capricorn District Municipality of the Limpopo province of South Africa. It is located 73 km northwest of Polokwane and 32 km southeast of Senwabarwana. Rosenkrantz village is a boughtfarm, which means it was bought collectively by the then community members. All members contributed an equal amount of money to purchase the farm collectively.

== Education ==
- Rozenkrantz Primary School.
- Mokateng Secondary School.

== Health ==
- Rozenkrantz Clinic.

== Sports ==
Football is the most popular sport in Rosenkrantz.

- Selata F.C.
- Ditlou F.C.
