= Droogte =

- Location within Limpopo Location within South Africa
- Coordinates: 24.496°S 29.357°E
- Country: South Africa
- Province: Limpopo
- District: Capricorn
- Municipality: Lepelle-Nkumpi

Area
  - Total: 3.82 km^{2} (1.47 sq mi)

Population (2011)
  - Total: 2,924
  - Density: 765/km^{2} (1,980/sq mi)

Racial makeup (2011)
  - Black African: 99.9%
  - Indian/Asian: 0.1%

First languages (2011)
  - Northern Sotho: 79.9%
  - S. Ndebele: 15.2%
  - Tsonga: 3.0%
  - Other: 2.0%
- Time zone: UTC+2 (SAST)

Droogte is a town in Capricorn District Municipality in the Limpopo province of South Africa.
