= Ga-Mokobodi =

Ga-Mokobodi Booslagte
- Location within Limpopo Location within South Africa
- Coordinates: 23.579°S 29.003°E
- Country: South Africa
- Province: Limpopo
- District: Capricorn
- Municipality: Blouberg

Area
  - Total: 1.55 km^{2} (0.60 sq mi)
- Elevation: 1,086 m (3,563 ft)

Population (2011)
  - Total: 1,103
  - Density: 712/km^{2} (1,840/sq mi)

Racial makeup (2011)
  - Black African: 99.9%
  - Other: 0.1%

First languages (2011)
  - Northern Sotho: 97.5%
  - Other: 2.5%
- Time zone: UTC+2 (SAST)
- Postal code (street): 0748
- Area code: +27 (0)15

Ga-Mokobodi is a village in Ga-Matlala in the Blouberg Local Municipality of the Capricorn District Municipality of the Limpopo province of South Africa. It is located about 5 km northwest of Tibane.

== Education ==
- Mošibi Mokobodi Primary School.
- Selamodi Secondary School.
