= Ga-Ramalapa =

- Location within Limpopo Location within South Africa
- Coordinates: 23.714°S 29.046°E
- Country: South Africa
- Province: Limpopo
- District: Capricorn
- Municipality: Polokwane

Area
  - Total: 1.23 km^{2} (0.47 sq mi)
- Elevation: 1,086 m (3,563 ft)

Population (2011)
  - Total: 881
  - Density: 716/km^{2} (1,860/sq mi)

Racial makeup (2011)
  - Black African: 99.9%
  - Coloured: 0.1%

First languages (2011)
  - Northern Sotho: 96.8%
  - Tsonga: 1.0%
  - Other: 2.2%
- Time zone: UTC+2 (SAST)
- Postal code (street): 0748
- Area code: +27 (0)15

Ga-Ramalapa is a large village in Ga-Matlala in the Polokwane Local Municipality of the Capricorn District Municipality of the Limpopo province of South Africa. It is located 47 km northwest of Polokwane.

== Education ==
- Ramalapa Primary School.
