= Taung, Limpopo =

Kordon
- Location within Limpopo Location within South Africa
- Coordinates: 23.716°S 29.050°E
- Country: South Africa
- Province: Limpopo
- District: Capricorn
- Municipality: Polokwane

Government
  - Indunas: Selolo and Phakane

Area
  - Total: 2.32 km^{2} (0.90 sq mi)
- Elevation: 1,086 m (3,563 ft)

Population (2011)
  - Total: 1,702
  - Density: 734/km^{2} (1,900/sq mi)

Racial makeup (2011)
  - Black African: 100.0%

First languages (2011)
  - Northern Sotho: 96.8%
  - Other: 3.2%
- Time zone: UTC+2 (SAST)
- Postal code (street): 0748
- Area code: +27 (0)15

Kordon is a village in Ga-Matlala in the Polokwane Local Municipality of the Capricorn District Municipality of the Limpopo province of South Africa. It is located 47 km northwest of Polokwane on the Matlala Road.

== Education ==
- Tau-Kwena Primary School.
