= Ga-Ramakara =

- Location within Limpopo Location within South Africa
- Coordinates: 23.740°S 29.084°E
- Country: South Africa
- Province: Limpopo
- District: Capricorn
- Municipality: Polokwane

Area
  - Total: 1.14 km^{2} (0.44 sq mi)
- Elevation: 1,086 m (3,563 ft)

Population (2011)
  - Total: 653
  - Density: 573/km^{2} (1,480/sq mi)

Racial makeup (2011)
  - Black African: 100.0%

First languages (2011)
  - Northern Sotho: 86.4%
  - Tsonga: 10.9%
  - Other: 2.8%
- Time zone: UTC+2 (SAST)
- Postal code (street): 0748
- Area code: +27 (0)15

Ga-Ramakara is a village in Ga-Matlala in the Polokwane Local Municipality of the Capricorn District Municipality of the Limpopo province of South Africa. It is located 44 km northwest of Polokwane on the Matlala Road.

== Education ==
- Konkoti Primary School.
- Kwena-A-Peu Secondary School.
