= De Villiersdale =

- Location within Limpopo Location within South Africa
- Coordinates: 23.253°S 28.797°E
- Country: South Africa
- Province: Limpopo
- District: Capricorn
- Municipality: Blouberg

Area
  - Total: 5.38 km^{2} (2.08 sq mi)

Population (2011)
  - Total: 1,103
  - Density: 205/km^{2} (531/sq mi)

Racial makeup (2011)
  - Black African: 100.0%

First languages (2011)
  - Northern Sotho: 97.5%
  - English: 1.4%
  - Other: 1.2%
- Time zone: UTC+2 (SAST)

De Villiersdale is a town in Capricorn District Municipality in the Limpopo province of South Africa. As a result of growing population De Villiersdale was divided into De Villiersdale 1 and De Villiersdale 2. It has one traditional leader with two traditional communities. The area has ancient rock arts that form part of the Makgabeng plateau. What is mostly depicted is giraffes indicating the totem of the royal family that resides over the area.

De Villiersdale defended its territory during the Mfecane wars-graves still exists of pregnant slain women-, Malaboch war (1894), Apartheid, and even today for its traditional community and recognition of its tribe in the democratic South Africa. Apart from the rock arts, De Villiersdale has large caves that were used as hiding places for women, children and livestock during the ancient battles. The name De Villiersdale was named by the apartheid regime and forced the royal family to buy the land from it. This allowed other tribes to infiltrate the land - as they also bought the land. De Villiersdale has had many traditional leaders imposed on it by former Republic of South Africa governments. Seanego has always ruled the area from time immemorial. The population is largely Christian. The traditional way of life is the only thing remaining - this largely because of the constant community gatherings discussing issues from land development to land disputes among families.

The traditional court is still practiced here; and its ruling are binding and highly regarded by the communities. Only cases that threatens life or involve loss of property are referred to the police. It is not surprising that the community has had so many developments initiated by the community and maintained for so many years. To name a few: one primary school-Kgwale Primary school(Closed for lack of enrollment of pupils), one secondary school-Phumatla Secondary School(Closed for lack of enrollment by pupils), one combined school- grade 1 to 12-Mohlakeng Combined school(Named after the mountain of the famed Seanego who founded the current Village-Driekoppies- under Malebogo villages-; boreholes and their pumps. It supplies all the villages with water, electricity from Eskom, burial societies, community budget etc. The communities generally live in peace.

One thing also very important about the villages is that they have very closely knit inter-community marriages. The communities also have annual seniors' soccer matches inviting other nearby villages during December vacations. Throughout the year, school children engage in soccer and netball activities, traditional dance competitions, poetry competitions, drama competitions. Life in this area is sure remote from all the glam, lights, buzzing of urban areas but is a good place for social cohesion. The area is surrounded by mountains and is very sandy; this have kept the area out of interest from intruders for many years.

When one walks on most if not all the mountains surrounding it; one can't help but notice the ruins of thriving homesteads build deep in the forests. When asking senior citizens of the village the answer you get is always similar: "to see enemies from far, the low lying areas were used for cattle breeding and farming". This land is sure sacred.

De villiersdale is the first land to be registered under natives on Republic of South Africa deeds record when the country became independent from Colony in 1960s. The De villiersdale nation-Bakgalaka- are the only tribe that has never been subdued by any other emerging tribes in sub-sahara Africa. This is the mythical Bakgalaka of the North that reverberates across many royal household. Many Kingdoms exists because of the wisdom of Bakgalaka who remain mystical and practice their seniority in forging peace among many emerging Royal households.
