= Kameelkop =

- Location within Limpopo Location within South Africa
- Coordinates: 23.448°S 29.210°E
- Country: South Africa
- Province: Limpopo
- District: Capricorn
- Municipality: Molemole

Area
  - Total: 3.38 km^{2} (1.31 sq mi)

Population (2011)
  - Total: 1,174
  - Density: 347/km^{2} (900/sq mi)

Racial makeup (2011)
  - Black African: 99.9%
  - Other: 0.1%

First languages (2011)
  - Northern Sotho: 98.6%
  - Other: 1.4%
- Time zone: UTC+2 (SAST)

Kameelkop is a town in Capricorn District Municipality in the Limpopo province of South Africa.
