= Grootdraai =

- Location within Limpopo Location within South Africa
- Coordinates: 23.116°S 28.704°E
- Country: South Africa
- Province: Limpopo
- District: Capricorn
- Municipality: Blouberg

Area
  - Total: 0.78 km^{2} (0.30 sq mi)

Population (2001)
  - Total: 996
  - Density: 1,300/km^{2} (3,300/sq mi)
- Time zone: UTC+2 (SAST)

Grootdraai is a town and a mine in Capricorn District Municipality in the Limpopo province of South Africa.
