= 118 Battalion =

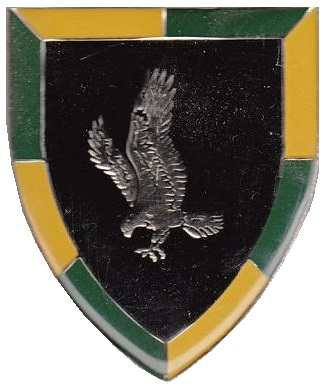
- 118 Battalion emblem
- Country: South Africa
- Branch: South African Army
- Type: Motorised infantry
- Part of: South African Army Infantry Corps
- Garrison/HQ: Lebowakgomo old fire station Northern Transvaal, Limpopo Province
- Motto(s): Bogale
- Equipment: Buffel APC, Samil 20

Commanders
- OC: Commandant M. Scheepers, Lt Col P de Vos Viljoen, Lt Col Steyn, Lt Col F Beukes

Insignia
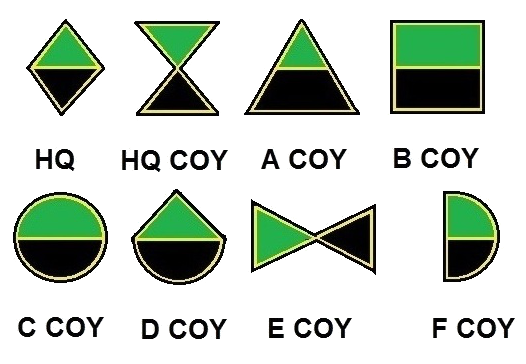
- Company level insignia

- SA Motorised Infantry beret bar circa 1992: SA Motorised Infantry beret bar

118 South African Infantry Battalion was a motorised infantry unit of the South African Army.

== History ==
=== Origin of the black battalions ===
By the late 1970s the South African government had abandoned its opposition to arming black soldiers within the SADF.

By early 1979, the government approved a plan to form a number of regional African battalions, each with a particular ethnic identity, which would serve in their homeland or under regional SADF commands.

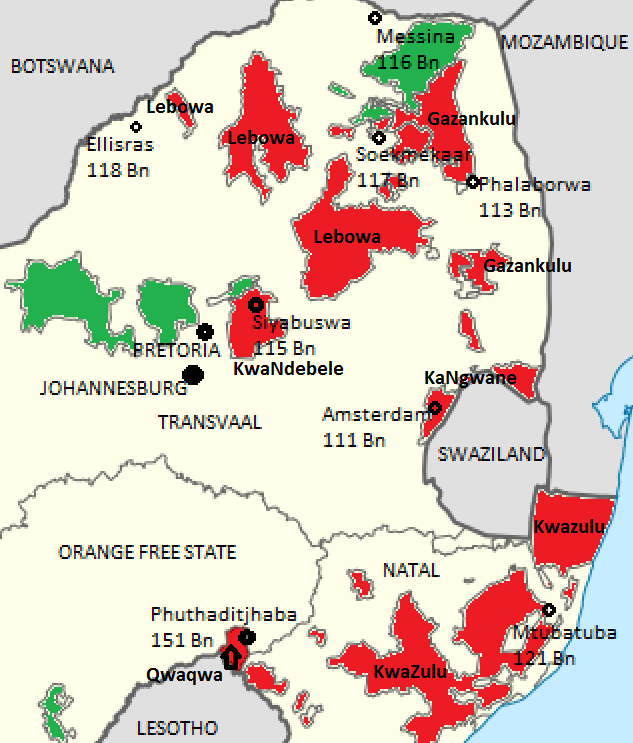
Location of the 100 Battalions in relation to their respective homelands

=== Development of the Lebowa Defence Force ===
Two additional Northern Sotho Battalions were established, the 117 and the 118. Troops for 118 SA Battalion were recruited from the self-governing territory of Lebowa.

=== Higher Command ===
118 Battalion initially resorted under the command of Group 45 then Group 14 from Potgietersrus. This command was eventually changed to Group 29 with amalgamation.

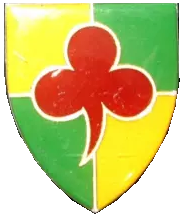
SADF Group 14 emblem

=== Deployments ===
118 Battalion was utilised to patrol the Lebowa and parts of the Botswana border. At some stage the unit was also stationed at Mtubatuba in Kwa Zulu Natal for border patrols in that region.

=== Disbandment ===
2006.

== Insignia ==
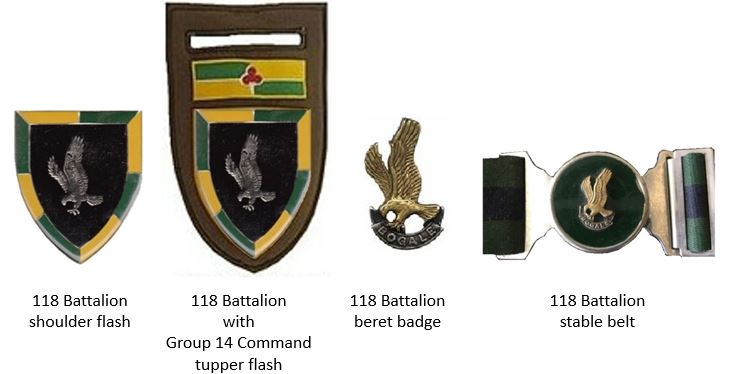
SADF era 118 Battalion insignia
