= Mamehlabe =

- Location within Limpopo Location within South Africa
- Coordinates: 23.550°S 28.983°E
- Country: South Africa
- Province: Limpopo
- District: Capricorn
- Municipality: Blouberg

Area
  - Total: 2.01 km^{2} (0.78 sq mi)
- Elevation: 1,086 m (3,563 ft)

Population (2011)
  - Total: 1,785
  - Density: 888/km^{2} (2,300/sq mi)

Racial makeup (2011)
  - Black African: 99.9%
  - Indian/Asian: 0.1%

First languages (2011)
  - Northern Sotho: 90.0%
  - Tsonga: 6.0%
  - Zulu: 1.0%
  - Other: 3.0%
- Time zone: UTC+2 (SAST)
- Postal code (street): 0748
- Area code: +27 (0)15

Mamehlabe is a large village in Ga-Matlala in the Blouberg Local Municipality of the Capricorn District Municipality of the Limpopo province of South Africa. It is located about 10 km northwest of Tibane on the Matlala Road.

== Education ==
- Wingfield Primary School.
- Mamehlabe Secondary School.

== Sports ==
- Mamehlabe Brothers F.C.
- Mamehlabe Tigers F.C.
