= Mabokelele =

Village in Limpopo Province, South Africa

Coordinates: 23.7528°S 29.29°E

Mabokelele is a village next to Koloti in the Capricorn District Municipality. It is situated on the R567 road, 25 km northwest of Polokwane, the capital of Limpopo Province in South Africa.
