= Schuinsrand =

- Location within Limpopo Location within South Africa
- Coordinates: 24.273°S 29.420°E
- Country: South Africa
- Province: Limpopo
- District: Capricorn
- Municipality: Lepele-Nkumpi

Area
  - Total: 1.95 km^{2} (0.75 sq mi)

Population (2011)
  - Total: 1,761
  - Density: 903/km^{2} (2,340/sq mi)

Racial makeup (2011)
  - Black African: 99.7%
  - White: 0.1%
  - Other: 0.3%

First languages (2011)
  - S. Ndebele: 48.0%
  - Northern Sotho: 44.3%
  - Tsonga: 5.4%
  - Other: 2.3%
- Time zone: UTC+2 (SAST)

Schuinsrand is a town in Lepelle-Nkumpi Local Municipality in the Limpopo province of South Africa.
