= Laaste Hoop =

- Location within Limpopo Location within South Africa
- Coordinates: 23.994°S 29.656°E
- Country: South Africa
- Province: Limpopo
- District: Capricorn
- Municipality: Polokwane

Area
  - Total: 9.58 km^{2} (3.70 sq mi)

Population (2011)
  - Total: 6,670
  - Density: 696/km^{2} (1,800/sq mi)

Racial makeup (2011)
  - Black African: 99.9%

First languages (2011)
  - Northern Sotho: 96.1%
  - Tsonga: 1.2%
  - Other: 2.7%
- Time zone: UTC+2 (SAST)

Laaste Hoop is a village located 36 km north of Polokwane and falls under the jurisdiction of Polokwane Local Municipality in the Limpopo province of South Africa.

It is under tribal leadership. The ntona of the place is Mantsho Mojapelo and it is under the supreme leadership of Kgosi Malatswa Molepo, the son of the deceased Setlakalane Molepo.

The village has one high school, Malatswa High School, and two primary schools, Mamothalo and Laastehoop Primary School.

The old Laastehoop primary school is used as offices for a community project tasked with unearthing talent in the area named JSM and also THUTO FOUNDATION host annual career exhibition at the same premises.
