= Zebediela =

- Location within Limpopo Location within South Africa
- Coordinates: 24.310°S 29.270°E
- Country: South Africa
- Province: Limpopo
- District: Capricorn
- Municipality: Lepelle-Nkumpi

Area
  - Total: 59.62 km^{2} (23.02 sq mi)

Population (2011)
  - Total: 448,000
  - Density: 7,510/km^{2} (19,500/sq mi)

Racial makeup (2011)
  - Black African: 86.7%
  - Coloured: 0.2%
  - Indian/Asian: 0.1%
  - White: 10.4%
  - Other: 2.6%

First languages (2011)
  - Northern Sotho: 51.9%
  - Afrikaans: 9.3%
  - Tsonga: 5.4%
  - English: 4.9%
  - Ndebele: 28.5%
- Time zone: UTC+2 (SAST)
- Area code: 015

Zebediela is a group of villages in Capricorn District Municipality, Limpopo Province, South Africa. It is south-east of Polokwane, next to Lebowakgomo. It is well known for the production of citrus fruits, mainly oranges.

Zebediela was home to the Zebediela Citrus Estate (13,785 hectares (34,060 acres)), one of the largest citrus estates in the country. Most of the citrus products produced at the estate were exported to the international market.

Minority languages spoken in the area include Afrikaans, Venda, and Tsonga.

== Etymology ==
The proper name of the group of villages is Sebetiela, named after a former Ndebele chief of the area. However, a spelling error Zebediela became popular instead, and remained. It's also commonly referred to as "ZB", "Zbee", or Dinamuneng ("place of oranges").

== List of villages ==
These are the primary villages which compose Zebedelia:

- Moletlane
- Mogoto
- Mathibela
- Rakgwatha
- Matome
- Makushwaneng
- Madisha Leolo
- Motserereng
- Madisha Ditoro
- Magatle
- Mapatjakeng
- Makweng
- Ga-Mamogwaša
- Rafiri
- Molapo
- Makgophong
- Drogte
- Volop
- Bolahlakgomo
- Dicheung
- Beldrif
- Malatane
- Mehlareng
- Ga-Molapo
- Khureng
- Seruleng

Each village within Zebediela has their own chief or inDuna, which in turn are beholden to the King, the royal leader of Zebediela.

== Attractions ==
Local tourist attractions include the Leshoka Thabang Game Reserve (next to Ga-Rafiri) and Zebediela Country Club in Farm Kleinwonder.

Zebediela Plaza is the main shopping center for all of the surrounding villages.

== Notable people ==
1. Kgoši Ndlovu

Originated from Kwa-Zulu Natal, a descendant of the Ndlovu clan.Led his people during the early stages of conflict, causing them to move to modern day Pietersmaritzburg. His descendants continued leadership in the region.

2. Kgoši Gheghe / Keke

Took over leadership from his father, Ndlovu. Led the people to modern-day Tshwane. His leadership led to the settlement in different areas, including parts of Transvaal.

3. Kgoši Boloko

Succeeded Kgoši Keke. His leadership left an impact on the structure of Matebele settlements.

4. Kgoši Sekhubathane

A significant leader during a time when the Matebele people began spreading out and interacting with neighboring groups. Under his leadership, the Matebele people spread eastward and confronted neighboring tribes, such as Batlokwa. His regiments were the first to discover the place that is now modern day Zebediela .

5. Kgoši Ramabele I ( Boredi )

Took over from Sekhubathane. Engaged in battles with other groups, particularly Batlokwa, leading to further territorial shifts. Married and had several offspring, continuing the legacy of leadership.

6. Kgoši Shikwane I

Known for his self-reliance and resilience. Brought unity among the Matebele after conflicts. Confronted various neighboring tribes in his reign.

7. Kgoši Sello I

Known for his leadership, despite personal challenges, such as health issues. Married into other prominent families, strengthening his rule and alliance with neighboring tribes.His reign saw both successes and setbacks.

8. Kgoši Maboyaboya

Took leadership after Sello I.Known for uniting people and maintaining peace during his rule. His reign ended with a shift in leadership after his death.

9. Kgoši Ramabele II ( Mamokebe )

Took over after Maboyaboya. His leadership involved continued alliances and consolidation of Matebele lands.

10. Kgoši Shikwane II

Known for his leadership of the Matebele during a time of internal and external pressures.Led with a focus on protecting and expanding the Matebele people’s influence.

11. Kgoši Abel ( Moswara bogoši )

Regent King of the Matebele a Moletlane.

12. Sello II

Had epilepsy and died while his son Shikoane III, was too young to rule.

13. Kgoši Matšatši I

The King regent who sat on the throne after Kgoši Shikoane II, alongside Chief Maesela Seswai Kekana, the father of Princess Nkatsana Violet Kekana who later married into the Mphahlele family.

14. Kgoši Shikwane III

Succeeded the earlier Shikwane kings. Faced challenges during his reign, including the division of the people and external conflicts.

15. Kgoši Kgale

Led after Shikwane III. His reign was characterized by internal conflicts but he succeeded in securing his position despite external challenges.Remained in leadership until 2004.

16. Kgoši Sello III Madimetja Kekana

The King of Zebediela Ndebele (Matebele a Moletlane) people in Limpopo. He died on January 5, 2021

17. Kgoši Shikoane IV

The current King of Zebediela.

Notable natives of Zebediela include singer-songwriters,Trampjoy, Mmatema Moremi, Umanji and Steve Kekana, as well as singer/rapper Senyaka.

Well-known football players Alex Bapela, Hlompho Kekana, Paseka Mako, and Motjeka Madisha

== Healthcare ==
Groothoek Hospital was one of the biggest hospitals in the northern province before it was shut down. Zebediela Hospital in Magatle and Lebowakgomo Hospital now serve the villages.

Other healthcare providers include Unjani Clinic in Moletlane, as well as many other private general health practitioners and traditional doctors.
