= Klipheuvel =

- Location within Limpopo Location within South Africa
- Coordinates: 24.609°S 29.462°E
- Country: South Africa
- Province: Limpopo
- District: Capricorn
- Municipality: Lepele-Nkumpi

Area
  - Total: 1.56 km^{2} (0.60 sq mi)

Population (2011)
  - Total: 1,996
  - Density: 1,280/km^{2} (3,310/sq mi)

Racial makeup (2011)
  - Black African: 99.7%
  - Coloured: 0.1%
  - Indian/Asian: 0.2%

First languages (2011)
  - Northern Sotho: 84.9%
  - S. Ndebele: 9.6%
  - Tsonga: 2.7%
  - Zulu: 1.1%
  - Other: 1.8%
- Time zone: UTC+2 (SAST)

Klipheuvel is a town in Capricorn District Municipality in the Limpopo province of South Africa.
