= Ga-Ramokadikadi =

Ga-Ramokadikadi Vlakfontein
- Location within Limpopo Location within South Africa
- Coordinates: 23.676°S 29.037°E
- Country: South Africa
- Province: Limpopo
- District: Capricorn
- Municipality: Polokwane

Area
  - Total: 4.22 km^{2} (1.63 sq mi)
- Elevation: 1,089 m (3,573 ft)

Population (2011)
  - Total: 2,136
  - Density: 506/km^{2} (1,310/sq mi)

Racial makeup (2011)
  - Black African: 98.8%
  - Coloured: 0.3%
  - Indian/Asian: 0.2%
  - Other: 0.7%

First languages (2011)
  - Northern Sotho: 94.9%
  - Tswana: 1.0%
  - Other: 4.1%
- Time zone: UTC+2 (SAST)
- Postal code (street): 0748
- Area code: 015

Ga-Ramokadikadi, also known as Vlakfontein, is an affluent, large village in Ga-Matlala in the Polokwane Local Municipality of the Capricorn District Municipality of the Limpopo province of South Africa. It lies about 2 km south of Tibane and 54 km northwest of Polokwane on the Matlala Road.

== Demographics ==
The dominant language of the settlement is Northern Sotho, with Xitsonga as the main minority language. People of African descent are the main ethnic group, with the rest of the population consisting of Coloureds and Asians. Most of the villagers are Christians and a small minority of Muslims exists.

== Infrastructure ==
The settlement lies directly east of Matlala Road which connects Tibane and Polokwane. Most of the residents of the village are professionals and are economically far better off than other typical South African villagers. Matlala SAPS station, the only police station in the Ga-Matlala, is located in the village.

== Education ==
- Ikagaleng Makobe Primary School
- Motliši Secondary School
