= Taaiboschgroet =

- Location within Limpopo Location within South Africa
- Coordinates: 22.846°S 28.909°E
- Country: South Africa
- Province: Limpopo
- District: Capricorn
- Municipality: Blouberg

Area
  - Total: 2.65 km^{2} (1.02 sq mi)

Population (2001)
  - Total: 5,268
  - Density: 1,990/km^{2} (5,150/sq mi)
- Time zone: UTC+2 (SAST)

Taaiboschgroet is a village via the D1589 road in the Blouberg Local Municipality under the Capricorn District Municipality in the Limpopo province of South Africa under the leadership of Kgosi Mamadi.
