= Ga-Lepadima =

Ga-Lepadima Prospect
- Location within Limpopo Location within South Africa
- Coordinates: 23.603°S 29.015°E
- Country: South Africa
- Province: Limpopo
- District: Capricorn
- Municipality: Blouberg

Area
  - Total: 1.88 km^{2} (0.73 sq mi)
- Elevation: 1,086 m (3,563 ft)

Population (2011)
  - Total: 1,231
  - Density: 655/km^{2} (1,700/sq mi)

Racial makeup (2011)
  - Black African: 99.9%
  - Indian/Asian: 0.1%

First languages (2011)
  - Northern Sotho: 99.1%
  - Other: 0.9%
- Time zone: UTC+2 (SAST)
- Postal code (street): 0748
- Area code: +27 (0)15

Ga-Lepadima is a village in Ga-Matlala in the Blouberg Local Municipality of the Capricorn District Municipality of the Limpopo province of South Africa. It is located a mere 2 km north of Tibane on the Matlala Road.
