= Kabelo =

Kabelo may refer to:

- Kabelo Mmono, Batswana high jumper
- Kabelo Kgosiemang, Batswana high jumper
- Kabelo Mabalane, South African rapper
- Kabelo Secondary School, a state school located in Polokwane, South Africa
