= Morebeng =

Morebeng Soekmekaar
- Location within Limpopo Location within South Africa
- Coordinates: 23.496°S 29.929°E
- Country: South Africa
- Province: Limpopo
- District: Capricorn
- Municipality: Molemole

Area
  - Total: 53.31 km^{2} (20.58 sq mi)

Population (2011)
  - Total: 2,371
  - Density: 44.48/km^{2} (115.2/sq mi)

Racial makeup (2011)
  - Black African: 96.5%
  - Indian/Asian: 0.2%
  - White: 2.7%
  - Other: 0.5%

First languages (2011)
  - Northern Sotho: 73.4%
  - Venda: 8.0%
  - Tsonga: 6.9%
  - Afrikaans: 3.1%
  - Other: 8.6%
- Time zone: UTC+2 (SAST)
- Postal code (street): 0810
- PO box: 0810
- Area code: 015

Morebeng, formerly known as Soekmekaar, is a small, rural town on the R36 road in the Molemole Local Municipality of the Capricorn District Municipality of the Limpopo province of South Africa. It is located about 65 km southeast of Louis Trichardt.
