= Koloti =

- Location within Limpopo Location within South Africa
- Coordinates: 23.746°S 29.307°E
- Country: South Africa
- Province: Limpopo
- District: Capricorn
- Municipality: Polokwane

Government
  - Councillor: Kgabo Moloto

Area
  - Total: 10.81 km^{2} (4.17 sq mi)

Population (2011)
  - Total: 9,953
  - Density: 920.7/km^{2} (2,385/sq mi)

Racial makeup (2011)
  - Black African: 99.8%
  - Coloured: 0.2%

First languages (2011)
  - Northern Sotho: 95.4%
  - Zulu: 1.1%
  - Other: 3.6%
- Time zone: UTC+2 (SAST)
- PO box: 0709
- Area code: 015

Koloti is a town in Capricorn District Municipality in the Limpopo province of South Africa. It is the seat of the Aganang Local Municipality. Koloti is also the home of Moletsi fm (Community radio station) and the home to Koena Segodi, professionally known by DJ Bluetooth.
