= You Are Here =

You Are Here may refer to:

== Music ==
- You Are Here (Opshop album), 2004
- You Are Here (South album), 2008
- You Are Here (Thenewno2 album)
- You Are Here (UFO album), 2004
- You Are Here (+/- album)
- You Are Here (Banco de Gaia album), 2004
- You Are Here, an album by Atomic Hooligan, or the title song
- You Are Here, an album by Silver Sun
- You Are Here (EP), by Irish folk musician Brigid Mae Power, 2010
- "You Are Here", a song by James Marriott, 2021
- "You Are Here" (song), a song by John Lennon from Mind Games
- "You Are Here", a song by Needtobreathe from Daylight
- "You Are Here", a gospel song by Dr. Tumi

== Film and television ==
- You Are Here (1998 film), a screwball comedy starring Robert Knepper
- You Are Here (1998 TV film), a British television comedy short with music by Jonathan Whitehead
- You Are Here (2007 film), a romantic comedy starring Bijou Phillips
- You Are Here, also known as Are You Here, a 2013 American comedy-drama film directed by Matthew Weiner
- You Are Here (2010 film), a fantasy/science-fiction drama directed by Daniel Cockburn
- You Are Here (2018 film), a documentary film directed by Moze Mossanen
- You Are Here (Cartoon Network), a programming block on the U.S. Cartoon Network
- "You Are Here" (Charlie Jade), an episode of the television series Charlie Jade

== Literature ==
- You Are Here (novel), a novel by David Nicholls
- You Are Here, a graphic novel by Kyle Baker
- You Are Here: Around the World in 92 Minutes, a photo book by Chris Hadfield

== Other uses ==
- "You are here", a point indicated on a map to show the onlooker their exact location in an area and in which direction they need to travel to reach a certain place
- You Are Here (sculpture), an outdoor 2012 bronze sculpture by American artist Ron Baron

== See also ==
- Earth's location in the universe
