= Polokwane Ext 44 =

Township in Polokwane

Greenside
- Township
- Polokwane Ext 44
- Motto: Green is the prime colour of the world.
- Location within Limpopo Location within South Africa Location within Africa Location within Earth
- Coordinates: 23.8914°S 29.4165°E
- Country: South Africa
- Province: Limpopo
- District: Capricorn
- Municipality: Polokwane Municipality
- Main Place: Polokwane

Government
  - Executive Mayor: Thembi Nkadimeng (ANC)
  - Mayor: John Mpe

Area
  - Total: 1.38 km^{2} (0.53 sq mi)

Population (2011)
  - Total: 11,928
  - Density: 8,640/km^{2} (22,400/sq mi)
- Demonym: Greensiders

Racial makeup (2011)
  - Black African: 99.45%
  - Coloured: 0.18%
  - Indian/Asian: 0.10%
  - White: 0.03%
  - Other: 0.23%

First languages (2011)
  - Sepedi: 66.19%
  - English: 6.04%
  - Venda: 6.04%
  - Xitsonga: 5.58%
  - Other: 16.15%
- Time zone: UTC+2 (SAST)
- Postal code (street): 0699
- PO box: 0700
- Area code: 015
- Bird: Northern royal albatross
- Flower: Blue squill
- Website: Official website

Polokwane Ext 44 (UK: /ˌpɒləˈkwɑːnɪ/, meaning "Place of Safety" in Northern Sotho; alternatively Greenside or simply Ext 44), is a township in Polokwane under the Capricorn District Municipality in the Limpopo province of South Africa.

Ext 44 was the first township to ever emerge from the City of Polokwane, despite experiencing the heavy rains and floods throughout the years, the township is known for its never dying criminal activities.

== Education ==
- Kabelo Secondary School
- Greenside Primary School
