= Ditiro Mashigo =

South African textile and fashion designer

- Born: Lebowakgomo, Limpopo, South Africa
- Education: Tshwane University of Technology
- Occupation(s): Textile artist, fashion designer
- Years active: 2014–present
- Known for: Fibre art, sustainable design, Serati brand

Ditiro Mashigo (born 1990) is a South African textile artist and fashion designer known for her innovative approach to fabric, fibre art, and sustainable design. She is the founder of the design label Serati Ltd, and her work explores spirituality, heritage, and materiality through a blend of fashion and fine art.

== Early life and education ==
Mashigo was born in Lebowakgomo, Limpopo, South Africa. Her family moved to Pretoria in 1994. Mashigo attended Pro Arte Alphen Park High School, where she finished her matric.

She studied textile and fashion design, later completing an Advanced Diploma in Fine and Applied Arts at the Tshwane University of Technology. From a young age, Mashigo was fascinated by the colorful patterns found in nature and was inspired by the women who created crafts and art in her community to become a designer.

== Career ==
In 2014, Mashigo established Serati Ltd, a fashion and textile brand focusing on high-craft design inspired by her Sepedi heritage, spirituality, and the natural environment. Her rise to national recognition came in 2019 when she was selected to design costumes for the Grammy Award-winning Soweto Gospel Choir. During the COVID-19 pandemic in South Africa, Mashigo worked with #10MillionMasks in Tshwane, an NGO that called on South Africans to help get 10 million fabric masks to the people who needed them. In 2023 Mashigo collaborated with Mr Price on a project titled 'uMsamo.' The limited-edition collection was available at 48 selected Mr Price stores as well as online.

== Exhibitions ==
- Izulu Ikhaya Lami (2024)
- Crossroads/ Tsila Tse Pedi (2024)
- Mamello e tswala Katlego (2023)
- Lekunutung le Morena (2023)
- Written in Thread 2024

== Awards and recognition ==
- The Best Open Range 3rd Year, The Tshwane University of Technology, 2013.
- Nandos Hot Young Designer Finalist 2018.
- Design Indaba Emerging Artist 2017.
- Cassirer Welz Award Finalist, 2025.
