= Molemole Local Municipality elections =

The Molemole Local Municipality is a Local Municipality in Limpopo, South Africa. The council consists of thirty-two members elected by mixed-member proportional representation. Sixteen councillors are elected by first-past-the-post voting in sixteen wards, while the remaining sixteen are chosen from party lists so that the total number of party representatives is proportional to the number of votes received. In the election of 1 November 2021. The African National Congress (ANC) won a majority of 22 seats on the council.

== Results ==
The following table shows the composition of the council after past elections.

== December 2000 election ==
The following table shows the results of the 2000 election.

Party	Ward			List			Total seats
Party	Votes	%	Seats	Votes	%	Seats	Total seats
African National Congress	12,450	85.92	12	13,081	85.55	8	20
Democratic Alliance	1,113	7.68	0	1,081	7.07	2	2
Pan Africanist Congress of Azania	666	4.60	0	1,129	7.38	1	1
Independent candidates	261	1.80	0				0
Total	14,490	100.00	12	15,291	100.00	11	23
Valid votes	14,490	98.54		15,291	98.39		
Invalid/blank votes	215	1.46		250	1.61		
Total votes	14,705	100.00		15,541	100.00		
Registered voters/turnout	37,065	39.67		37,065	41.93		

== March 2006 election ==
The following table shows the results of the 2006 election.

Party	Ward			List			Total seats
Party	Votes	%	Seats	Votes	%	Seats	Total seats
African National Congress	17,512	89.80	13	17,359	89.04	10	23
Democratic Alliance	1,047	5.37	0	975	5.00	1	1
African Christian Democratic Party	224	1.15	0	331	1.70	1	1
Pan Africanist Congress of Azania	190	0.97	0	272	1.40	0	0
United Democratic Movement	141	0.72	0	227	1.16	0	0
Freedom Front Plus	200	1.03	0	140	0.72	0	0
United Independent Front	109	0.56	0	100	0.51	0	0
Azanian People's Organisation	78	0.40	0	91	0.47	0	0
Total	19,501	100.00	13	19,495	100.00	12	25
Valid votes	19,501	98.98		19,495	98.89		
Invalid/blank votes	201	1.02		219	1.11		
Total votes	19,702	100.00		19,714	100.00		
Registered voters/turnout	42,212	46.67		42,212	46.70		

== May 2011 election ==
The following table shows the results of the 2011 election.

Party	Ward			List			Total seats
Party	Votes	%	Seats	Votes	%	Seats	Total seats
African National Congress	19,517	84.51	14	20,525	89.28	10	24
Democratic Alliance	970	4.20	0	989	4.30	1	1
Congress of the People	759	3.29	0	880	3.83	1	1
Independent candidates	1,288	5.58	0				0
African Christian Democratic Party	406	1.76	0	343	1.49	1	1
Pan Africanist Congress of Azania	132	0.57	0	105	0.46	0	0
Azanian People's Organisation	22	0.10	0	147	0.64	0	0
Total	23,094	100.00	14	22,989	100.00	13	27
Valid votes	23,094	98.54		22,989	98.10		
Invalid/blank votes	341	1.46		445	1.90		
Total votes	23,435	100.00		23,434	100.00		
Registered voters/turnout	45,795	51.17		45,795	51.17		

== August 2016 election ==
The following table shows the results of the 2016 election.

Party	Ward			List			Total seats
Party	Votes	%	Seats	Votes	%	Seats	Total seats
African National Congress	21,852	72.52	16	21,920	72.74	7	23
Economic Freedom Fighters	6,248	20.73	0	6,303	20.92	7	7
Democratic Alliance	1,297	4.30	0	1,275	4.23	2	2
Congress of the People	241	0.80	0	217	0.72	0	0
African Christian Democratic Party	175	0.58	0	161	0.53	0	0
Freedom Front Plus	112	0.37	0	133	0.44	0	0
Pan Africanist Congress of Azania	76	0.25	0	74	0.25	0	0
Independent candidates	98	0.33	0				0
Agang South Africa	35	0.12	0	52	0.17	0	0
Total	30,134	100.00	16	30,135	100.00	16	32
Valid votes	30,134	98.52		30,135	98.69		
Invalid/blank votes	454	1.48		401	1.31		
Total votes	30,588	100.00		30,536	100.00		
Registered voters/turnout	59,052	51.80		59,052	51.71		

== November 2021 election ==
The following table shows the results of the 2021 election.

Party	Ward			List			Total seats
Party	Votes	%	Seats	Votes	%	Seats	Total seats
African National Congress	17,985	66.24	15	18,907	70.16	7	22
Economic Freedom Fighters	4,230	15.58	0	4,535	16.83	6	6
Capricorn Independent Community Activists Forum	1,589	5.85	1	994	3.69	1	2
Democratic Alliance	868	3.20	0	772	2.86	1	1
Independent candidates	1,122	4.13	0				0
Civic Warriors	291	1.07	0	455	1.69	1	1
African Transformation Movement	185	0.68	0	171	0.63	0	0
Africa Restoration Alliance	111	0.41	0	225	0.83	0	0
African Christian Democratic Party	122	0.45	0	157	0.58	0	0
Abantu Batho Congress	135	0.50	0	124	0.46	0	0
Pan Africanist Congress of Azania	92	0.34	0	146	0.54	0	0
African People's Convention	106	0.39	0	107	0.40	0	0
Congress of the People	97	0.36	0	98	0.36	0	0
Defenders of the People	68	0.25	0	117	0.43	0	0
Prophetic Movement Army	73	0.27	0	64	0.24	0	0
Azanian People's Organisation	36	0.13	0	76	0.28	0	0
Kingdom Covenant Democratic Party	43	0.16	0				0
Total	27,153	100.00	16	26,948	100.00	16	32
Valid votes	27,153	98.60		26,948	98.23		
Invalid/blank votes	385	1.40		485	1.77		
Total votes	27,538	100.00		27,433	100.00		
Registered voters/turnout	59,548	46.25		59,548	46.07		
