= Lebowakgomo =

- Location within Limpopo Location within South Africa
- Coordinates: 24.305°S 29.565°E
- Country: South Africa
- Province: Limpopo
- District: Capricorn
- Municipality: Lepelle-Nkumpi

Area
  - Total: 25.68 km^{2} (9.92 sq mi)

Population (2011)
  - Total: 35,087
  - Density: 1,366/km^{2} (3,539/sq mi)

Racial makeup (2011)
  - Black African: 99.3%
  - Coloured: 0.2%
  - Indian/Asian: 0.2%
  - White: 0.1%
  - Other: 0.2%

First languages (2011)
  - Northern Sotho: 87.2%
  - English: 2.8%
  - Zulu: 1.5%
  - Tsonga: 1.5%
  - Other: 6.9%
- Time zone: UTC+2 (SAST)
- Postal code (street): 0737
- PO box: 0737
- Area code: 015

Lebowakgomo is the seat of the Lepelle-Nkumpi Local Municipality and was the capital of the former Bantustan of Lebowa. Lebowakgomo lies 45 km (28 mi) southeast of the Limpopo capital of Polokwane. The majority of Lebowakgomo's inhabitants speak SePedi.

== History ==
The township was established in the early 1970s to become the capital of Lebowa, and was enlarged and developed in the 1980s. The name is derived from two Northern Sotho words Lebowa ("north") and Kgomo ("cow"). The land where Lebowakgomo is located was donated to the former Lebowa Government by Chief Mmutle Mphahlele of the Bakgaga ba gaMphahlele. The chief's palace lies 10 km southeast of the township in Seleteng village.

Lebowakgomo was one of the eight townships in the former Bantustan; the seven others were Mahwelereng, Sešego, Mankweng, Lenyenye, Namakgale, Praktiseer, Mašišing and Senwabarwana.

== Educational institutions ==
In the early 1990s, Lebowakgomo had three primary schools in Zone A (Little Bedfordview, Mogodumo and Ntseekgopu), in Zone F (Dr Dixon Mphahlele) and in Zone B (Eureka), and three high schools: Derek Kobe High School, Lebowakgomo High School, SJ van der Merwe Full Service Technical High School and towards the late 90s Lebowakgomo Commercial(which later became Waterberg FET College), and Mathomomayo High School. Before 2005 two more primary and secondary schools were built in Zone A and Zone S.

== Radio station ==
Greater Lebowakgomo Community Radio (GLFM) is one of two local radio station broadcasting at 89.8 FM. A digital radio station now exists called Connect Radio and broadcasts on www.connectradio.co.za.The radio stations target the communities within Lepelle-Nkumpi Municipality and the youth with content such as news, sports, talk and music.

== Health facilities ==
Thabamoopo Hospital is a psychiatric hospital located in Lebowakgomo Zone A just a few kilometres from Lebowakgomo Hospital. Both are public hospitals and offer free services to those who are eligible for free services and charge government hospital rates to other citizens. There are other public health facilities and clinics in Lebowakgomo Zone B and Lebowakgomo Zone R. The township has always been dominated by public health facilities and a handful of private health facilities. Over the years there has been a rise in private general practitioners, psychologists and gynaecologists. The private hospital Medleb commenced operations in 2018.

== Sports and recreation ==
Lebowakgomo Stadium was a multi-use municipal facility which was mostly used to host private functions and recreational events like the annual AKasiDream event hosted every Easter to bring the youth together and a family fun day hosted every spring filled of fun and games for family and children. This facility was capable to administer sporting events such as soccer, tennis, netball, basketBall and baseball. Currently that is done at Baroka Village, a world class local facility by Baroka FC which caters for soccer and events.

Tennis was once very popular with the people of Lebowakgomo. This was due to the collective effort of community members who, through their own interest in the sport, taught themselves and then others to play. Tennis has paved a career pathway for many junior players in sports.

== Neighbouring communities ==
Lebowakgomo is a township in Limpopo surrounded by small to medium-sized villages that contribute the vast majority of day dwellers in its business district. These villages include Makotse, Ga-Ledwaba home of the Traditional Authority of Ga-Ledwaba, Ga-Rakgoatha, Ga-Mphahlele, Sepanapudi, Ga Masemola and Zebediela.

Zebediela is home to the Zebediela Citrus Farm, which in its prime, prior to land redistribution, exported citrus to international and local markets. Its oranges were famous among locals.

Just 13 km out of Lebowakgomo lies the Zion Christian Church, former headquarters Podingwane from 1937 to 1942 before moving to Moria.

== Notable people ==
Notable people from Mphahlele and Lebowakgomo include:

- Baroka F.C., soccer team
- Arthur Mafokate, musician
- Sefako Makgatho, second president of the African National Congress
- Lehlogonolo Masoga, Deputy Speaker of the Limpopo Legislature, former ANC Youth League leader
- Stanley Mathabatha, premier of the Limpopo Province, South Africa
- Bokang Montjane, Miss South Africa 2010
- Es'kia Mphahlele
- Letlapa Mphahlele, former president of Pan Africanist Congress of Azania
- Ramahlwe Mphahlele, South African football player
- Lilian Ngoyi née Matabane, first woman elected to the executive committee of the African National Congress
- Cedric Phatudi, Chief Minister of Lebowa 1973–1987
- Shebeshxt, recording artist
