= Nelson Ramodike =

South African politician (died 2012)

- Died: 3 May 2012
- Occupation: Lebowa government chief minister
- Organization: Lebowa People's Party

Mogoboya Nelson Ramodike (died 3 May 2012) was a South African politician who served as Chief Minister of Lebowa, an apartheid-era bantustan, from 21 October 1987 to 26 April 1994. He subsequently represented the United Democratic Movement in the National Assembly from 1999 to 2003.

== Background ==
Ramodike was a former traffic police officer turned politician who began his political activism with Lebowa People's Party in the 1980s. He became chief minister after the death of then chief minister of the Lebowa government Cedric Phatudi..

== Political affiliation ==
Ramodike is referred to as a conformist for disbanding his political party, the Lebowa People's Party, to form the United People's Front in order to pave the way for participation in the Convention for a Democratic South Africa (CODESA).

In the year that Ramodike took power, the United Democratic Front assisted in the launch of the Congress of Traditional Leaders of South Africa (CONTRALESA), which took a stance against the "Bantustan" system and in favour of a unified, democratic South Africa. This, and the suppression of the violence youth revolt that rocked Lebowa in the mid 1980s, facilitated Ramodike's more conservative yet still anti-Apartheid stance and alliance with traditional leaders. While Ramodike was a member of the United Democratic Front, and later joined the African National Congress for a place in the CODESA negotiations before the 1994 South African general election., he also maintained power through violent attacks on political opponents, facilitated by the Ramodike-aligned Sofasonke Party </ref>

Ramodike often addressed traditional leadership about political developments in the Lebowa Bantustans. For example, Ramodike addressed the Hananwa traditional authority at a rally.

After the 1994 elections, Ramodike joined the United Democratic Movement (UDM); he won election to a UDM seat in the National Assembly in the 1999 general election, representing the Limpopo constituency. He also served as spokesperson for the UDM. However, he resigned from the UDM and therefore from Parliament in early 2003 in order to establish his own political party, the Alliance for Democracy and Prosperity. He quit politics due to illness in May 2007.

== Corruption allegations ==
The De Meyer report presented allegations of corrupt activities in the Lebowa government, with Nelson Ramodike accused of involvement in two illegal liquor licenses. Nelson Ramodike was allegedly involved in corruption activities that involved running state funded business through proxies such as cousins and brothers.

== Court cases against government ==
During his tenure as chief minister, Ramodike introduced a statute referred to as the Lebowa Mineral Act (LMT). As legislation during the Bantustans period, the LMT sought to place land rights under the former Lebowa administration and mineral rights to the people in the locality. The LMT was later referred to as controversial post 1994, where several debates and discussions took place among members of the Parliament of South Africa. Through these debates and discussions, it was resolved that the LMT should be abolished because it referred to land rights and mineral rights of a state that was no longer in existence in democratic South Africa. In response to a bill to abolishment of the Lebowa Mineral Act and Trust, Ramodike lodged a court challenge against the government of the African National Congress in the early 2000s. The court case was lost to former President Thabo Mbeki on 7 April 2001.

== Death ==
Nelson Ramodike died on 3 May 2012 at Tzaneen Mediclinic in Limpopo. Former Limpopo province premier Cassel Mathale lauded Nelson Ramodike for his role in the liberation struggle of South Africa.
