= Dendron =

"Dendron" (δένδρον) is the Greek word for "tree". Most, but not all, other uses of the name are derived from that meaning. It can refer to:

== Place names ==
- Dendron, Cumbria: a small English village/hamlet containing a well known church.
- Dendron, Limpopo, South Africa
- Dendron, Virginia, USA: a small town of about 300 people.
- Mega Dendron, Greek village, birthplace of Cosmas of Aetolia

== People ==
- An alias of musician Merv Pepler, one half of Eat Static.
- Dendron (band), all-female rock band from Germany.

== Other ==
- Dendrite: the (usually) postsynaptic branch of a neuron that carries postsynaptic potentials toward the cell body
- In biochemistry, a dendron is the reduced form of its original dendrimer
