= Umanji =

- Birth name: Maruti Johannes Nkuna
- Born: c. 1968; Zebediela, Limpopo, South Africa
- Origin: Limpopo, South Africa
- Died: 26 February 2008
- Genres: Afro Pop, Afro Soul
- Occupation(s): Singer-songwriter, instrumentalist
- Instrument(s): Singing, guitar
- Years active: 1999–2008
- Labels: Sony BMG

Umanji (c. 1968 – 26 February 2008), born Maruti Johannes Nkuna, was a South African musician and singer-songwriter.

== Biography ==
Umanji was born in the Zebediela region of Limpopo, South Africa. After spending eight years in the South African Police Force, he released his debut album, Moloi, in 1999, earning a nomination for best newcomer at the South African Music Awards (SAMA).

Umanji's subsequent albums were Wantolobela (2001) and Ndlala (2003). A song from the latter album won him Best Male Composer at SAMA 2005.

In 2006 Umanji fell ill with tuberculosis. After initial denials, he admitted he was HIV-positive the following year. He accused his record label, Sony BMG, of dropping him when he fell ill, and said he had been sidelined as a live performer.

Umanji died of AIDS-related causes in February 2008. Limpopo Premier Sello Moloto said at the time, "He was a talented musician with acclaim both here at home and abroad. There is no doubt that his style and sound will remain unique amongst his peers. Umanji will be dearly missed by our government and the people of our province."
