= Aganang Local Municipality =

Aganang
- Local municipality
- Seal

- Location in Limpopo
- Coordinates: 23°40′S 29°5′E
- Country: South Africa
- Province: Limpopo
- District: Capricorn
- Seat: Koloti
- Wards: 19

Government
  - Type: Municipal council
  - Mayor: Maria Mokobodi

Area
  - Total: 1,881 km^{2} (726 sq mi)

Population (2011)
  - Total: 131,164
  - Density: 69.73/km^{2} (180.6/sq mi)

Racial makeup (2011)
  - Black African: 99.6%
  - Coloured: 0.1%
  - Indian/Asian: 0.1%
  - White: 0.1%

First languages (2011)
  - Northern Sotho: 89.5%
  - Southern Ndebele: 5.1%
  - Tsonga: 2.6%
  - Other: 2.8%
- Time zone: UTC+2 (SAST)
- Municipal code: LIM352

Aganang Local Municipality, was a municipality in the Capricorn District Municipality, of Limpopo province, South Africa. Aganang is a Northern Sotho name that means "uplifting one another". It was de-established after the 2016 local government elections and incorporated into neighboring municipalities.

== Main places ==
The 2011 census divided the municipality into the following main places:

Place	Code	Area (km^{2})	Population	Most spoken language
Aganang	970002	1,683	1,678	Northern Sotho
Maraba	970074	1.63	1,626	Northern Sotho
Matlala	970043	2.35	2,031	Northern Sotho
Moletji	970024	7.08	5,740	Northern Sotho
Seshego	974043	28.08	83,863	Northern Sotho

== Politics ==
The municipal council consists of thirty-seven members elected by mixed-member proportional representation. Nineteen councillors are elected by first-past-the-post voting in nineteen wards, while the remaining eighteen are chosen from party lists so that the total number of party representatives is proportional to the number of votes received. In the election of 18 May 2011 the African National Congress (ANC) won a majority of thirty-two seats on the council. The following table shows the results of the election.

Party	Votes				Seats		
Party	Ward	List	Total	%	Ward	List	Total
ANC	26,294	26,599	52,893	86.0	19	13	32
COPE	1,339	1,230	2,569	4.2	0	2	2
DA	920	936	1,856	3.0	0	1	1
ACDP	610	541	1,151	1.9	0	1	1
UDM	569	525	1,094	1.8	0	1	1
AZAPO	524	349	873	1.4	0	0	0
PAC	252	175	427	0.7	0	0	0
NFP	173	203	376	0.6	0	0	0
APC	17	238	255	0.4	0	0	0
Total	30,698	30,796	61,494	100.0	19	18	37
Spoilt votes	594	502	1,096				
