= Cedric Phatudi =

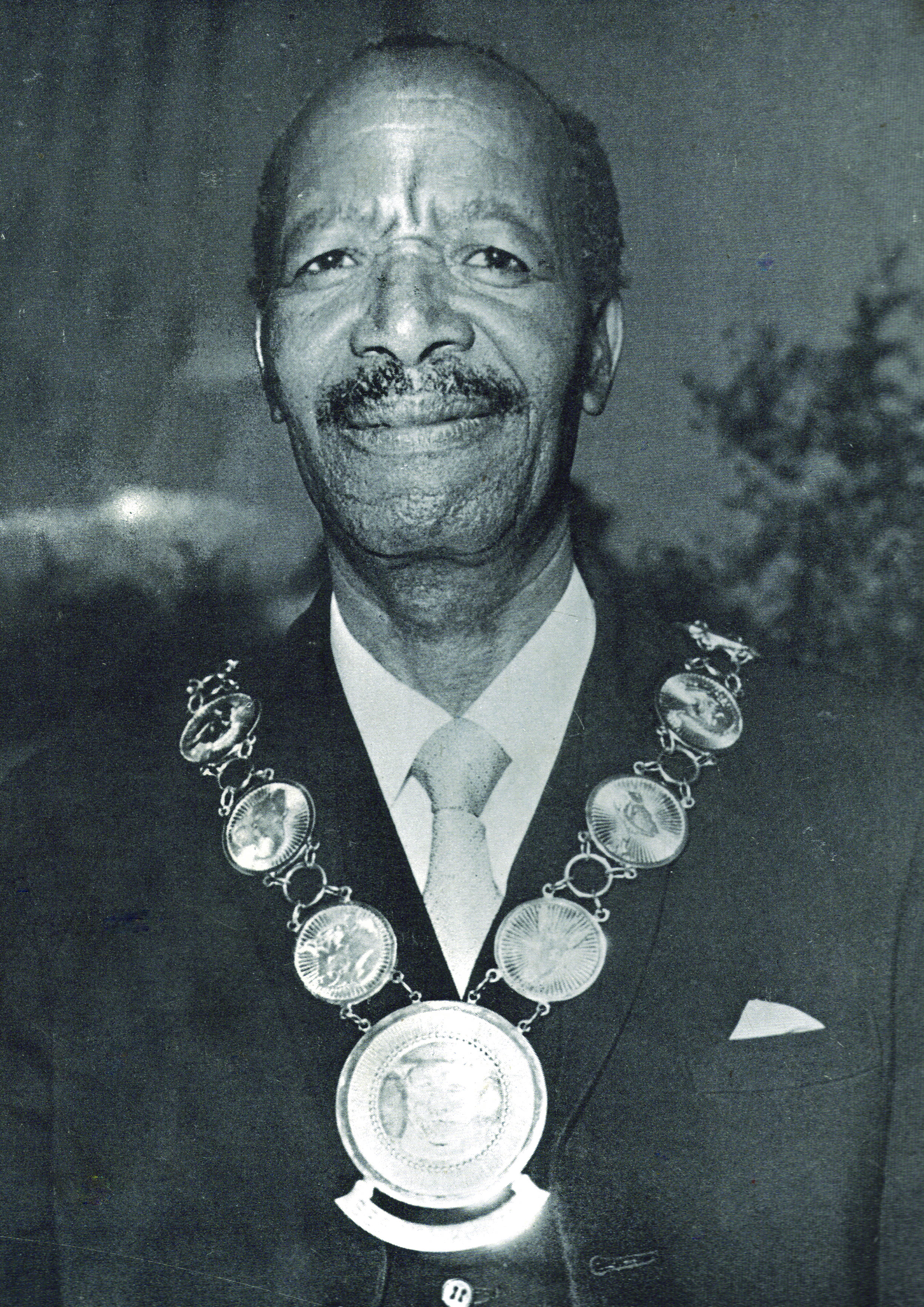

2nd Chief Minister of Lebowa
- In office 8 May 1973 – 7 October 1987
- Preceded by: Mokgoma Maurice Matlala
- Succeeded by: ZT Seleka

1st Minister of Education of Lebowa
- In office 2 October 1972 – 8 May 1973

Personal details
- Born: Cedric Namedi Phatudi; 27 May 1912 Ga-Mphahlele, Transvaal, Union of South Africa
- Died: 7 October 1987 (aged 75) Lebowakgomo, Lebowa, South Africa
- Party: Lebowa People's Party

Dr Cedric Namedi Phatudi (27 May 1912 – 7 October 1987) was the Chief Minister of Lebowa, one of the South African bantustans.

== Early life ==
Phatudi was born in Limpopo, Ga-Mphahlele, Seleteng, the son of the chief of the Mphahlele tribe. He earned his basic education in mission schools.

== Education ==
Phatudi initially worked as a teacher and educational administrator before attending the University of Fort Hare, gaining a BA in 1947 and a teaching diploma in 1950 at the University of the Witwatersrand, and graduating with a BEd in 1965. It was during this time that he made his contributions to the Sepedi language. He authored and co-authored a few books in Sepedi. He is also known to have translated some of Shakespeare's works into Sepedi.

His books include the Lehlabile Series, co-authored with G.O. Mojapelo (ISBN 978-0-7980-0023-9), published by Educum.

He was awarded an honorary doctorate from the University of the North in 1973, after which he encouraged others to use the "Dr" title wherever possible when referring to him.

Phatudi served as president of the Federation of Inspectors of Schools in South Africa from 1958 to 1969.

== Chief Minister of Lebowa ==
Phatudi became involved in the nascent Lebowa nation-building exercise and rose in prominence to the point that, when Lebowa was granted self-government on 2 October 1972, he was appointed Minister for Education before his election as Chief Minister on 8 May 1973. Not one for wasting time settling into the role, Phatudi had been Chief Minister for one day when he informed the South African government that if Lebowa was to become self-sufficient, then substantial tracts of South Africa, including a number of white towns, would need to be added to Lebowan territory. The statement was not well received in Pretoria, though they eventually transferred several small tracts of land to Lebowa.

The earlier outburst aside, Phatudi was considered the most tactful of the bantustan leaders, with a modus operandi focused more on calm negotiations with Pretoria and dissident bodies than on the angry outbursts epitomised by leaders like the Transkei's Kaiser Matanzima. However, when these failed, Phatudi was not above unleashing his police against political opponents.

Phatudi also successfully negotiated that Es'kia Mphahlele, who was then a prohibited person, be allowed back into the country. After this success, he later also attempted to negotiate the release of Nelson Mandela, but unfortunately, this was not realised.

Economic problems continued to plague Lebowa, and Phatudi struggled to maintain control over the increasingly disgruntled homeland population throughout his rule. He died in office in 1987.

He was succeeded by Noko Nelson Ramodike from Tzaneen. Lebowa itself lasted only another seven years before its reintegration into the Transvaal.
