= Lebowa =

Bantustan in South Africa (1972–1994)

Coordinates: 24°18′26″S 29°34′45″E

- 1972–1994
- Flag Coat of arms

- Location of Lebowa (red) within South Africa (yellow).
- Status: Bantustan
- Capital: Lebowakgomo
- Common languages: Northern Sotho; English; Afrikaans
- Chief Minister
- History
  - Self-government: 2 October 1972
  - Re-integrated into South Africa: 27 April 1994

Area
- 1980: 24,540 km^{2} (9,470 sq mi)

Population
  - 1980: 1,700,000
  - 1991: 2,740,587
- Currency: South African rand
Preceded by	Succeeded by
Republic of South Africa	Republic of South Africa

Lebowa was a Bantustan ("homeland") located in the Transvaal in northeastern South Africa. Seshego initially acted as Lebowa's capital while the purpose-built Lebowakgomo was being constructed. Granted internal self-government on 2 October 1972 and ruled for much of its existence by Cedric Phatudi, Lebowa was reincorporated into South Africa in 1994. It became part of the Limpopo province. The territory was not contiguous, being divided into two major and several minor portions.

Even though Lebowa included large swathes of Sekukuniland and was seen as a home for the Northern Sotho speaking ethnic groups such as the Pedi people, it was also home to various non-Northern Sotho speaking tribes, including the Northern Ndebele, Batswana and VaTsonga.

== Etymology ==
The name "Lebowa" is an archaic spelling of the Northern Sotho word "leboa" which means "north". The name was chosen as a compromise between the various Northern Sotho ethnic groups for which it was designed. It can be loosely described as having been a shortened form of "the country of the Northern Sotho peoples."

== History ==
The North Sotho National Unit (also referred to as the Lebowa Territorial Authority in some government documents) was founded on 1 June 1960 in pursuance of separate development. It was created to be a homeland for Northern Sotho peoples such as Bapedi, Batlokwa, Babirwa, Banareng, Bahananwa, Balobedu, Bakone, Baroka, Bakgakga, Bahlaloga, Batau, Bakwena, Baphuthi, Batlou and many others. On 2 October 1972 it was granted internal self-governance and renamed Lebowa. Beginning in the 1950s through to the 1970s, thousands of people were forcibly removed from their communities and relocated to Lebowa.

The first black leader of the territory was Chief Mokgoma Maurice Matlala who was handpicked by the apartheid authorities. He first led the North Sotho National Unit as its Executive Chief Councillor from August 1969 to 2 October 1972 at which point he became the Executive Chief Minister of Lebowa. The following year of 1973 on 3 May Mokgoma lost the first elections of the homeland to the Dr. Cedric Phatudi took over in a non-partisan contest. He went on to win two more re-elections in 1978 and 1973 but died in his third term in 1987. ZT Seleka was announced as the interim leader of the homeland. After elections, Mogoboya Nelson Ramodike became the Executive Chief Minister until 1989 when the office became the Prime Ministry.

On 24 April 1994 Nelson Ramodike resigned and the homeland had no active administration until 27 April when it was reintegrated into South Africa.

The overwhelming majority of its territory became part of the newly formed province of the Northern Transvaal (now Limpopo) and a smaller portion formed the newly created Eastern Transvaal province (now Mpumalanga).

== Leaders of Lebowa ==
(Dates in italics indicate de facto continuation of office)

Tenure	Name	Role	Affiliation
Lebowa
August 1969 to 2 October 1972	Mokgama Maurice Matlala	Chief Executive Officer from 1 July 1971: Chief Executive Councillor	LNP
Lebowa (Self-Rule)
2 October 1972 to 8 May 1973	Mokgama Maurice Matlala	Chief Minister	LNP
8 May 1973 to 7 October 1987	Cedric Namedi Phatudi	Chief Minister	LPP
7 October 1987 to 21 October 1987	Z.T. Seleka	acting Chief Minister	LPP
21 October 1987 to 26 April 1994	Nelson Ramodike	Chief Minister	LPP
Lebowa re-integrated into South Africa on 27 April 1994

== Institutions of higher education ==
- University of the North

== Districts in 1991 ==
View source data.

Districts of the province and population at the 1991 census.

- Namakgale: 55,441 (LEB-13)
- Bolobedu: 196,669 (LEB-7)
- Sekgosese: 124,425 (LEB-10)
- Bochum: 149,869 (LEB-11)
- Mokerong: 446,155 (LEB-3)
- Seshego: 302,676 (LEB-4)
- Thabamoopo: 353,193 (LEB-1)
- Nebo: 324,909 (LEB-5)
- Sekhukhuneland: 404,335 (LEB-2)
- Naphuno: 167,665 (LEB-8)
- Mapulaneng: 215,250 (LEB-12)

Moutse, the 12th district, was forcibly seized from Lebowa in 1980 and was, despite violent resistance, officially integrated into KwaNdebele.

== See also ==
- Chief Ministers of Lebowa
- Sekukuniland
