= Matome =

Matome is a masculine Sepedi, Tsonga, and Japanese given name. In Sepedi the name means "second son", in Tsonga it means "to gather/united", and in Japanese it means ""summary/conclusion/settlement".

- Matome Chiloane, South African politician
- Matome Mathiane (born 1988), South African soccer player
- Matome Ugaki (1890–1945), Japanese admiral
