= Dr Tumi =

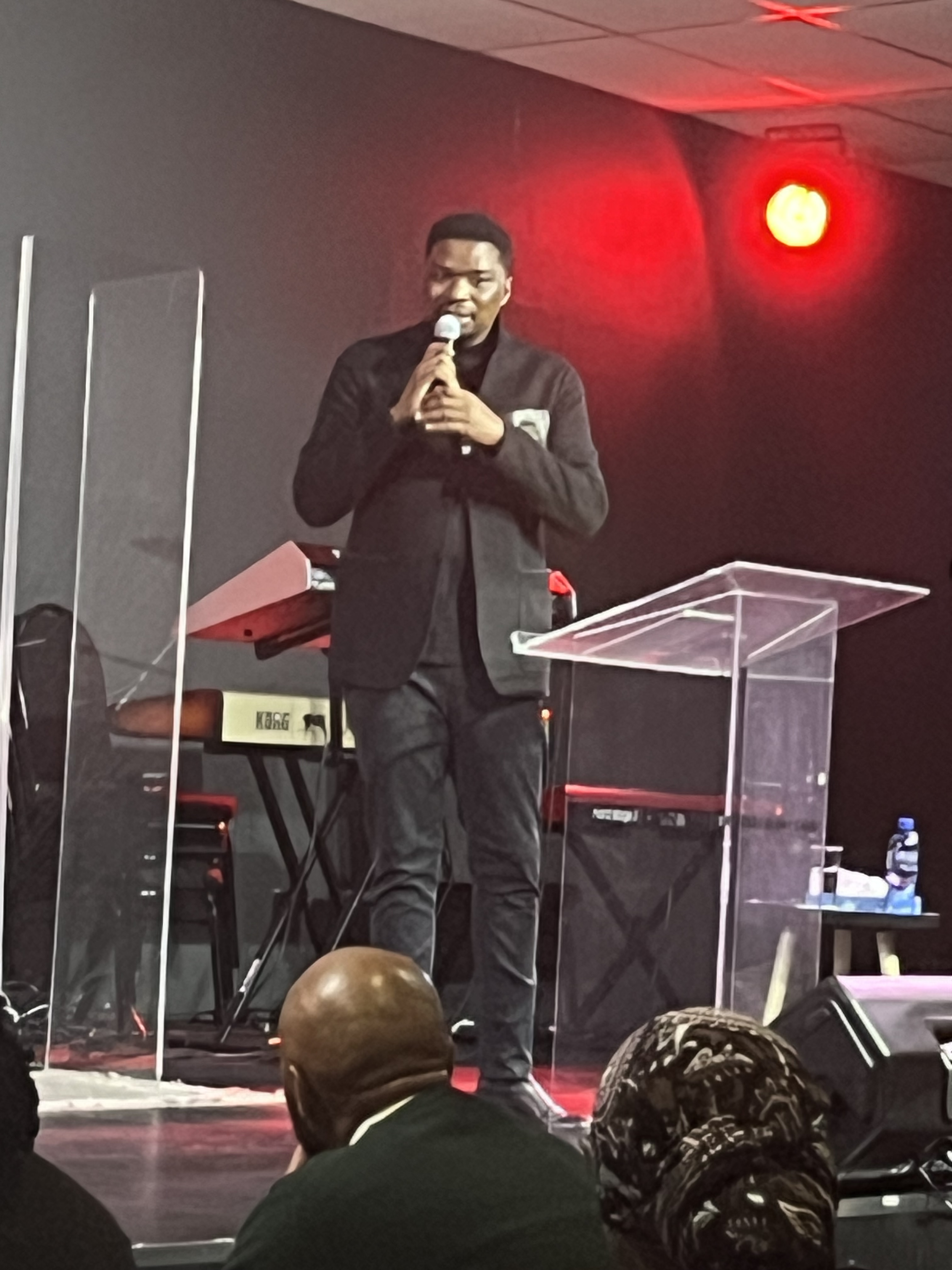
- Dr Tumi on stage in Fourways, Johannesburg
- Born: Tumisang Makweya; 1981 (age 44–45); Seshego, South Africa
- Occupation: Gospel recording artist
- Years active: 1990 - current
- Spouse: Kgaogelo Makweya
- Musical career
- Genres: Gospel, Urban Gospel
- Instruments: Vocals, guitar, piano

Tumisang Makweya (born 10 July 1981), also known as Dr Tumi, is a South African musician, medical doctor and a motivational speaker. Makweya has released several gospel albums and has won several gospel music awards.

== Early years ==
Makweya was born and raised in Seshego Limpopo Province, South Africa. From a young age, he displayed a strong interest in music and began singing in church. Despite his passion for music, he pursued a career in medicine, graduating with a medical degree from the Medical University of Southern Africa (Medunsa).

== Music career ==
Makweya's music career began in earnest after he won the "SABC2 Gospel Star" competition in 2012. This victory propelled him into the spotlight and opened doors for his musical journey.

In 2013, Makweya released his debut album, "Heart of a King," which received critical acclaim and established him as a rising star in the gospel music scene. His subsequent albums, including "Love and Grace" (2014) and "Speak a Word" (2016), solidified his status as a leading gospel artist.

Makweya's live recordings, particularly "The Gathering of Worshippers" series, have been major highlights of his career. These worship events, recorded live, have drawn thousands of attendees and have been widely celebrated for their spiritual impact and musical excellence.

=== Awards and recognition ===
Makweya has received numerous awards and nominations throughout his career, reflecting his contribution to gospel music. These include:

- Crown Gospel Music Awards
- SAMA (South African Music Awards) nominations
- African Gospel Music and Media Awards

== Personal life ==
In addition to his music career, Makweya continues to practice medicine, balancing his dual roles as a doctor and a musician. He is married to Kgaogelo Makweya, and together they have children. Makweya is also known for his philanthropic efforts, often using his platform to support various charitable causes and community initiatives.

== Controversies ==
Makweya's career has not been without controversy. In April 2021, he and his wife were briefly arrested in connection with an alleged National Lotteries Commission fraud case. However, they were later released, and Makweya maintained his innocence throughout the proceedings.

Charges against the couple were withdrawn in the Johannesburg Specialised Commercial Crimes Court.

== Discography ==
- Heart of a King (2013)
- Love and Grace (2014)
- The Gathering of Worshippers: Live at the Ticketpro Dome (2017)
- Beauty for Ashes (2018)
- Love on the Cross (2019)
