= 2016 Tshwane riots =

Civil unrest in South Africa

Tshwane riots
- Date: 20-23 June 2016
- Location: Tshwane
- Caused by: Unilateral appointment by the African National Congress of Thoko Didiza as its candidate for mayor of Tshwane in the 2016 municipal elections.
- Methods: Looting; Civil disobedience; Demonstrations
- Result: 5 dead, 54 people arrested

The Tshwane riots occurred in the South African city of Pretoria and the surrounding City of Tshwane Metropolitan Municipality for several days from 20 June 2016, leading to the deaths of at least five people.

== Riots ==
The protests were sparked by dissatisfaction with the appointment of Thoko Didiza as the incumbent African National Congress's (ANC) Tshwane mayoral candidate in the upcoming South African municipal elections of 2016. By 22 June, forty people had been arrested for participating in the riots. When the riots ended in Tshwane on 23 June, a total of 54 people had been arrested. Rioters looted businesses and attacked members of the public including immigrants and small traders. Nineteen buses worth R28-million were torched in the riots within the first two days of rioting; with the worst rioting occurring in the areas of Mamelodi‚ Atteridgeville‚ Mabopane‚ Soshanguve and Hammanskraal.

Minister of State Security David Mahlobo stated that the protests were started by ANC members "who were not satisfied with the processes" that resulted in Didiza being appointed the party's candidate for mayor of Tshwane. The ANC Youth League went on to accuse supporters of ANC member and incumbent Tshwane mayor, Kgosientso Ramokgopa, as the people responsible for initiating the riots.

Riots spread to Cape Town by 1 July 2016 with protesters stoning vehicles and torching buses along the N2 highway outside the neighbourhood of Nyanga. The protests in Cape Town were sparked by the announcement that Xolani Sotashe was to be the ANC's choice as candidate for the mayor of Cape Town.
