= Mogwadi =

Mogwadi Dendron
- Location within Limpopo Location within South Africa
- Coordinates: 23.368°S 29.323°E
- Country: South Africa
- Province: Limpopo
- District: Capricorn
- Municipality: Molemole

Area
  - Total: 4.73 km^{2} (1.83 sq mi)

Population (2011)
  - Total: 4,045
  - Density: 855/km^{2} (2,210/sq mi)

Racial makeup (2011)
  - Black African: 94.4%
  - Coloured: 1.0%
  - Indian/Asian: 0.4%
  - White: 3.5%
  - Other: 0.7%

First languages (2011)
  - Northern Sotho: 83.5%
  - Afrikaans: 3.5%
  - English: 2.9%
  - Zulu: 2.1%
  - Other: 8.1%
- Time zone: UTC+2 (SAST)
- Postal code (street): 0715
- Area code: 015

Mogwadi, formerly Dendron, is a small town on the R521 road in the Capricorn District Municipality in the Limpopo province of South Africa.

Located about 61 km northwest of Polokwane. It was laid out on the farm Duitsland and then managed by a health committee. The former name is derived from the Greek word for ‘tree’ and refers to the abundance of indigenous trees in the area.
