= Mothiba =

Mothiba is a surname. Notable people with the surname include:

- George and Joseph Mothiba, the members of South African band Revolution
- Lebo Mothiba (born 1996), South African footballer
- Lesiba Mothiba (1937–2013), South African politician
- Martha Hluni Mothiba, final victim of South African serial killer John Phuko Kgabi
- Neo Mothiba (born 1982), South African basketballer
