= Kabelo Combined School =

High school in Polokwane

Location
- 315 Ben Harris St. Polokwane Ext 44, Limpopo, 0699; South Africa
- Coordinates: 23.891188°S 29.419003°E

Information
- School type: Coeducational college preparatory state school
- Motto: Work hard in Silence and let the Success make noise
- Established: 2004; 22 years ago
- Status: Open
- Sister school: Greenside Primary School
- School district: Capricorn South (Polokwane)
- Principal: Mr. Mmola (2018–present)
- Staff: ~23 (full-time)
- Grades: 8–12
- Gender: All
- Age: 13 to 18
- Enrolment: ±700 pupils
- Language: Sepedi (Home Language); English (First Additional Language)
- Colours: Blue; White
- Rival: Westenburg Secondary School

Kabelo Combined School (also known as Kabelo Secondary School), is a college preparatory state school (no fee school) situated in Polokwane Ext 44 in the Limpopo province of South Africa. The school offers Science classes, Commerce, Tourism and History classes respectively in FET phase.

== History ==
The Gender-neutral public school was founded in 2004 at Greenside Ext 44, Polokwane. The school was initially a combined school comprising both high school and primary school before it was split into two in 2009.

Before the school was built, classes were attended in immobilised buses for quite some time, years later the school suffered with furniture.

The school is also known locally for its criminal activities that have occurred throughout its existence.

== Academics ==
Subjects offered for National Senior Certificate
English	Compulsory
Sepedi	Compulsory
Life Orientation	Compulsory
Mathematics and Maths Lit	Compulsory
Accounting	Elective
Business Studies	Elective
Life Science	Elective
Physical Science	Elective
History	Elective
Geography	Elective
Tourism	Elective
Agricultural Sciences	Elective
Economics	Elective
