= Mmankogaedupe Secondary School =

Secondary school in Limpopo Province, South Africa

Mmankogaedupe Secondary School is situated in Juno Ga-Matlala in Limpopo Province, South Africa. The school was erected in 1978 and was funded by the communities from three neighbouring villages (Juno, Ga Lepadima and Tibane) in the then apartheid regime.
