= Lekhureng =

- Location within Limpopo Location within South Africa
- Coordinates: 23.576°S 28.922°E
- Country: South Africa
- Province: Limpopo
- District: Waterberg
- Municipality: Mogalakwena

Area
  - Total: 1.96 km^{2} (0.76 sq mi)

Population (2011)
  - Total: 2,074
  - Density: 1,060/km^{2} (2,740/sq mi)

Racial makeup (2011)
  - Black African: 100.0%

First languages (2011)
  - Northern Sotho: 86.9%
  - Tsonga: 12.1%
  - Other: 1.0%
- Time zone: UTC+2 (SAST)
- PO box: 0748

Lekhureng is a large village in Ga-Matlala in the Mogalakwena Local Municipality of the Waterberg District Municipality of the Limpopo province of South Africa. It is located 79 km northwest of the city of Polokwane.
