= Tibane, Limpopo =

Tibane Tibanefontein
- Location within Limpopo Location within South Africa
- Coordinates: 23.633°S 29.050°E
- Country: South Africa
- Province: Limpopo
- District: Capricorn
- Municipality: Polokwane

Area
  - Total: 2.18 km^{2} (0.84 sq mi)
- Elevation: 1,089 m (3,573 ft)

Population (2011)
  - Total: 1,818
  - Density: 834/km^{2} (2,160/sq mi)

Racial makeup (2011)
  - Black African: 98.6%
  - Coloured: 0.1%
  - Indian/Asian: 0.2%
  - White: 0.1%
  - Other: 1.0%

First languages (2011)
  - Northern Sotho: 87.1%
  - Tsonga: 6.1%
  - Zulu: 2.0%
  - Other: 4.8%
- Time zone: UTC+2 (SAST)
- Postal code (street): 0748
- Area code: +27 (0)15

Tibane, also known as Tibanefontein, is a large, sprawling village in Ga-Matlala in the Polokwane Local Municipality of the Capricorn District Municipality of the Limpopo province of South Africa. It is located 55 km northwest of the city of Polokwane on the intersection between the R567 and D19 (Matlala rd) highways.

== Demographics ==
Africans of Sub-Saharan descent make up the majority of the rapidly growing Tibanefontein population, of which currently is estimated to be around 2000 - 3000. While South Asian immigrants and people of mixed ancestry make up the remainder of the population. Northern Sotho is the most spoken language, with Xitsonga, Venda, English, and Urdu comprising a small minority. Christianity is the most popular religion of the majority population, with the village hosting at least 5 different churches. While Islam is practiced by the South Asian minority.

== Geography ==
Tibanefontein is located just 55 km northwest of the capital city of Limpopo, Polokwane. Additionally, it is positioned at the intersection between two important roads, Matlala and R567; both of which are direct routes to and from the capital city, Polokwane. This makes Tibanefontein unique in its geography, making it a very attractive candidate for development. For example, the convenient location of Tibanefontein resulted in the major success of the local taxi industry, of which to this day, in terms of infrastructure development and revenue generation, remains ahead of that of other taxi ranks in possibly a 30 kilometer radius. The local taxi rank has a market which stretches kilometers north of Matlala road and west of the R567 road. Not surprisingly, construction for small shopping complex was completed in 2018, and Tibani Mall was opened the following year. This was another milestone in the progress to urbanization of the village, of which may not have occurred were it not for the village's unique location.

Tibanefontein's actual geography unfortunately lies within a hot semi-arid (steppe) climate. Therefore it receives very little annual rainfall, making it difficult for agricultural farming. Furthermore, the Matlala River, which has sources in the Mokopane region, eventually meeting the Mogalakwena River, is dry throughout most of the year, making it difficult for livestock farming. Not surprisingly, all of the village's water is sourced from underground aquifers, and pumped to one large tank. However, as the local population increases, and the dependence on one big tank to supply water to all of its population with persists, Tibanefontein is highly vulnerable to water shortages.

== Infrastructure ==
Tibane has electricity, tarred roads (Matlala road and R567), a taxi rank, a sports stadium, a post office, and running water. Tibani Shopping Centre is fully operational with a number of franchises, retails and other food chain stores. Poor network coverage in some areas. Certain areas Vodacom has no coverage.

== Central Business District ==
The Central Business District of Tibane includes a wide range of services which are rare in other villages of the municipality. These include many trading stores and general dealers; a filling station; panelbeaters and mechanics, a taxi rank; a post office; a small claims court; ICT shops; brick-manufacturers; steel and iron works and others. Some more formal businesses such as funeral parlours also have offices in the location. Matlala SAPS station is a mere 2 km south of the CBD in Ga-Ramokadikadi. Almost all of the businesses are located near the road intersection.

== Education ==
- Sebušimadiša Pre-School.
- Tibanefonten Primary School.
- Makobateng Secondary School, no longer exist. The school is closed.

There are no institutions of higher learning in Tibane. The majority of successful matriculants opt for the University of Limpopo's Turfloop Campus to further their studies, while others opt for universities based in Gauteng.

== Sports ==
Football is the most popular sport in Tibane, as it is throughout the whole of Aganang. It is followed by netball which gets much of its support from girls and women. The construction of Tibane Stadium was a huge boost for sports in the village. There are two community football teams located on the side of the Matlala road. Skomboys FC and All Blacks FC are the oldest football teams aging back to the 1970s while Cool King FC was only found in the early 2000s. It has produced massive talent over the years but lack of financial support has always been a disadvantage to these young boys as they usually manage to make it to the junior professional football leagues in the country. Their careers are often short-lived as young boys are often the main breadwinners in their homes. They leave football for better-paying jobs in the city of Gauteng, Johannesburg and across the country.

== Nearby villages ==
- Ga-Lepadima
- Ga-Mokobodi
- Juno
