= Molemole Local Municipality =

Coordinates: 23°30′S 29°35′E

Molemole
- Local municipality
- Seal

- Location in Limpopo
- Country: South Africa
- Province: Limpopo
- District: Capricorn
- Seat: Dendron
- Wards: 16

Government
  - Type: Municipal council
  - Mayor: E Paya

Area
  - Total: 3,347 km^{2} (1,292 sq mi)

Population (2011)
  - Total: 108,321
  - Density: 32.36/km^{2} (83.82/sq mi)

Racial makeup (2011)
  - Black African: 98.4%
  - Coloured: 0.1%
  - Indian/Asian: 0.1%
  - White: 1.1%

First languages (2011)
  - Northern Sotho: 87.8%
  - Tsonga: 2.1%
  - Venda: 1.9%
  - Afrikaans: 1.3%
  - Other: 6.9%
- Time zone: UTC+2 (SAST)
- Municipal code: LIM353

Molemole Municipality (Northern Sotho: Mmasepala wa Molemole) is a local municipality within the Capricorn District Municipality, in the Limpopo province of South Africa. The seat is Mogwadi.

== Main places ==
The 2001 census divided the municipality into the following main places:

Place	Code	Area (km^{2})	Population	Most spoken language
Backer	91101	0.34	1,217	Northern Sotho
Bochum	91102	11.64	4,142	Northern Sotho
Dendron	91103	2.98	1,885	Northern Sotho
Ga-Ramokgopa	91104	11.22	15,806	Northern Sotho
Manthata	91105	12.24	22,121	Northern Sotho
Moletjie	91107	11.66	4,989	Northern Sotho
Sekgosese	91108	349.99	46,749	Northern Sotho
Sekhokho	91109	1.24	1,852	Northern Sotho
Soekmekaar	91110	1.06	217	Northern Sotho
Remainder of the municipality	91106	2,944.04	10,463	Northern Sotho

== Politics ==
The municipal council consists of thirty-two members elected by mixed-member proportional representation. Sixteen councillors are elected by first-past-the-post voting in sixteen wards, while the remaining sixteen are chosen from party lists so that the total number of party representatives is proportional to the number of votes received. In the election of 1 November 2021 the African National Congress (ANC) won a majority of twenty-two seats on the council. The following table shows the results of the election.

Party	Ward			List			Total seats
Party	Votes	%	Seats	Votes	%	Seats	Total seats
African National Congress	17,985	66.24	15	18,907	70.16	7	22
Economic Freedom Fighters	4,230	15.58	0	4,535	16.83	6	6
Capricorn Independent Community Activists Forum	1,589	5.85	1	994	3.69	1	2
Democratic Alliance	868	3.20	0	772	2.86	1	1
Independent candidates	1,122	4.13	0				0
Civic Warriors	291	1.07	0	455	1.69	1	1
11 other parties	1,068	3.93	0	1,285	4.77	0	0
Total	27,153	100.00	16	26,948	100.00	16	32
Valid votes	27,153	98.60		26,948	98.23		
Invalid/blank votes	385	1.40		485	1.77		
Total votes	27,538	100.00		27,433	100.00		
Registered voters/turnout	59,548	46.25		59,548	46.07		
