= Seshego =

Seshego Sešego Maboneng
- Location within Limpopo Location within South Africa
- Coordinates: 23°51′S 29°23′E
- Country: South Africa
- Province: Limpopo
- District: Capricorn
- Municipality: Polokwane

Area
  - Total: 28.08 km^{2} (10.84 sq mi)

Population (2011)
  - Total: 83,863
  - Density: 2,987/km^{2} (7,735/sq mi)

Racial makeup (2011)
  - Black African: 99.2%
  - Coloured: 0.2%
  - Indian/Asian: 0.1%
  - White: 0.1%
  - Other: 0.3%

First languages (2011)
  - Northern Sotho: 84.5%
  - Tsonga: 3.1%
  - Venda: 2.4%
  - English: 2.1%
  - Other: 8.0%
- Time zone: UTC+2 (SAST)
- Postal code (street): 0742
- PO box: 0742
- Area code: 015

Seshego is a township in the Polokwane Local Municipality of the Capricorn District Municipality of the Limpopo province of the Republic of South Africa. The township lies directly northwest of the city of Polokwane.

== History ==
Between 1972 and 1974 Seshego was the capital of the non-independent Bantustan of Lebowa, which was abolished in 1994. The township's industries produce food, beverages, tobacco, textiles, wearing apparel, leather goods, wood and wood products, fabricated metal products, machinery, and equipment. Many of Seshego's inhabitants commute to Polokwane for employment.

== Zones ==
Seshego is divided into residential 8 zones. The Economic Freedom Fighters leader Julius Malema grew up in Zone 1 in an area called Masakaneng. The Seshego Dam is a dam on the Molautsi River/Blood River in the western side of the town.

== Climate ==
Köppen-Geiger climate classification system classifies its climate as mild semi-arid (BSk).

Climate data for Seshego
Month	Jan	Feb	Mar	Apr	May	Jun	Jul	Aug	Sep	Oct	Nov	Dec	Year
Mean daily maximum °C (°F)	27 (81)	26 (79)	25 (77)	24 (75)	22 (72)	19 (66)	19 (66)	22 (72)	24 (75)	26 (79)	26 (79)	26 (79)	24 (75)
Mean daily minimum °C (°F)	16 (61)	15 (59)	14 (57)	11 (52)	7 (45)	3 (37)	3 (37)	6 (43)	9 (48)	12 (54)	14 (57)	15 (59)	10 (51)
Average rainfall mm (inches)	80 (3.1)	57 (2.2)	51 (2.0)	22 (0.9)	5 (0.2)	0 (0)	0 (0)	0 (0)	3 (0.1)	30 (1.2)	72 (2.8)	69 (2.7)	389 (15.2)
Source: SA Explorer

== Notable people ==
- Julius Malema, leader of the Economic Freedom Fighters.
- Da Capo, DJ and record producer.
- Dr Tumi, musician and medical doctor
