= Lepelle-Nkumpi Local Municipality =

Lepelle-Nkumpi
- Local municipality
- Seal

- Location in Limpopo
- Coordinates: 24°15′S 29°40′E
- Country: South Africa
- Province: Limpopo
- District: Capricorn
- Seat: Lebowakgomo
- Wards: 30

Government
  - Type: Municipal council
  - Mayor: Meriam Molala

Area
  - Total: 3,463 km^{2} (1,337 sq mi)

Population (2011)
  - Total: 230,350
  - Density: 66.52/km^{2} (172.3/sq mi)

Racial makeup (2011)
  - Black African: 99.6%
  - Coloured: 0.1%
  - Indian/Asian: 0.1%
  - White: 0.1%

First languages (2011)
  - Northern Sotho: 86.9%
  - Southern Ndebele: 4.6%
  - Tsonga: 3.8%
  - Other: 4.7%
- Time zone: UTC+2 (SAST)
- Municipal code: LIM355

Lepelle-Nkumpi Municipality (Northern Sotho: Mmasepala wa Lepelle-Nkumpi) is a local municipality within the Capricorn District Municipality, in the Limpopo province of South Africa. The seat is Lebowakgomo.

== Main places ==
The 2001 census divided the municipality into the following main places:

Place	Code	Area (km^{2})	Population	Most spoken language
Bakgaga Ba Mphahlele	91301	591.16	71,646	Northern Sotho
Batau Ba Seloane	91302	96.24	6,457	Northern Sotho
Ditlou Ntshong	91303	85.16	5,334	Northern Sotho
Lebowakgomo	91304	183.46	26,190	Northern Sotho
Mafefe	91306	364.67	11,312	Northern Sotho
Mathabatha	91307	0.34	444	Northern Sotho
Mokerong	91308	0.79	1,573	Northern Sotho
Ndlovu	91309	1.67	1,878	Southern Ndebele
Thabamoopo	91310	239.51	6,438	Northern Sotho
Zebediela Part 1	91311	502.15	95,107	Northern Sotho
Zebediela Part 2	91312	1.41	179	Northern Sotho
Remainder of the municipality	91305	1,388.22	1,402	Northern Sotho

== Politics ==
The municipal council consists of sixty members elected by mixed-member proportional representation. Thirty councillors are elected by first-past-the-post voting in thirty wards, while the remaining thirty are chosen from party lists so that the total number of party representatives is proportional to the number of votes received. In the election of 1 November 2021 the African National Congress (ANC) won a majority of forty seats on the council. The following table shows the results of the election.

Party	Ward			List			Total seats
Party	Votes	%	Seats	Votes	%	Seats	Total seats
African National Congress	28,292	61.41	30	29,871	65.95	10	40
Economic Freedom Fighters	8,025	17.42	0	8,781	19.39	12	12
Defenders of the People	2,789	6.05	0	2,903	6.41	4	4
Independent candidates	3,931	8.53	0				0
Democratic Alliance	1,284	2.79	0	1,387	3.06	2	2
Magoshi Swaranang Movement	399	0.87	0	476	1.05	1	1
Lebowakgomo Civic Organization	264	0.57	0	436	0.96	1	1
8 other parties	1,090	2.37	0	1,442	3.18	0	0
Total	46,074	100.00	30	45,296	100.00	30	60
Valid votes	46,074	98.02		45,296	96.90		
Invalid/blank votes	930	1.98		1,447	3.10		
Total votes	47,004	100.00		46,743	100.00		
Registered voters/turnout	108,738	43.23		108,738	42.99		

== Corruption ==
In late 2023, Thabo Ben Mothogoane, the municipality's former municipal manager, and Rosina Mangaka Ngoveni, the former chief financial officer, were arrested in connection with the fraud at VBS Bank
