= Senwabarwana =

Town in Limpopo, South Africa

Senwabarwana Borkum Bochum
- Location within Limpopo Location within South Africa
- Coordinates: 23.271°S 29.123°E
- Country: South Africa
- Province: Limpopo
- District: Capricorn
- Municipality: Blouberg

Area
  - Total: 23 km^{2} (8.9 sq mi)

Population (2011)
  - Total: 12,306
  - Density: 540/km^{2} (1,400/sq mi)

Racial makeup (2011)
  - Black African: 98.83%
  - Coloured: 0.06%
  - Indian/Asian: 0.37%
  - White: 0.02%
  - Other: 0.69%

First languages (2011)
  - Northern Sotho: 89.41%
  - Tsonga: 0.71%
  - Other: 1.43%
  - English: 1.41%
  - Venda: 1.21%
- Time zone: UTC+2 (SAST)
- Postal code (street): 0790
- PO box: 0790
- Area code: 015

Senwabarwana, previously known as Bochum, is a town in the Blouberg Local Municipality of the Capricorn District Municipality in the Limpopo province of South Africa. The town is the seat of the Blouberg Local Municipality. It is located about 93 km northwest of the city Polokwane.

== Etymology ==
The colonial name may refer to the German industrial city of Bochum or be a corruption of Bochim, a biblical name (Judges 2:1 and 5). The place was named by the German missionary Carl Franz and his wife Helene to a mission station they established here in 1890. The majority language group of the area is Northern Sotho people and they refer to themselves as Bahananwa. They call the town Senwabarwana, a commemorative name for an incident that took place in a pond where the Khoi people found and drank water in their travelling, thus passing by. Due to their height they are proclaimed dwarfs by natives which literally means Morwana in Northern Sotho (Sepedi) and in a plural form is Barwana, hence "Sen-wa-barwana".

== History ==
German missionary Carl Franz and his wife Helene founded a hospital that used to cater for people with leprosy. The missionary station was part of the attempts of the Berlin Missionary Society to Christianize Southern Africa in the 19th century. The hospital is now known as Helene-Franz hospital. It has a bad reputation because of its high mortality rates and it is often referred to by old people as "the hospital of death".

The place is also known for its diverse people from chieftaincies such as Ga-Manthata, Ga-Matlala, Ga-Mmalebogo, Makgababeng, Moletši and the small town of Mogwadi.

== Institutions of Higher Education ==
=== TVET Colleges ===
- Capricorn TVET College Senwabarwana Campus.

=== Training Colleges ===
- New Life Computer Training College.

== Institutions of Basic Education ==
=== Secondary ===
- Radira secondary school
- Phala Secondary School.
- Dikoloi Secondary School
- Seiphi Secondary School
- Phagamang Secondary School.
- Kgolothwane Secondary School.
- Tema Secondary School
- Matthew Phosa Secondary School
- Maleboho Senior Secondary School.
- My Darling Secondary School

=== Primary ===
- Kgebetli.
- Mophamamona
- Senwabarwana.
- Tefu Primary School.
- Kawene High Primary School
- Hosea mochemi primary school
- Maphetsa Primary School, in Witten Village, Blouberg Rural, Limpopo
- Raseasala Primary School, Buffelshoek

== Special Needs Schools ==
- Ratanang.
- Helen Franz.

== Health Institutions ==
- Helen Franz Hospital.
- Blouberg Hospital.

== Notable people ==
- Punch Masenamela, a professional soccer player.
- Clement Maosa, a popular SABC TV actor.
- Mamphela Ramphele, an anti-apartheid activist and politician.
- Tefu Mashamaite, former Bidvest Wits and Kaizer Chiefs defender
