= Polokwane Local Municipality =

Polokwane
- Local municipality
- Seal

- Location of Polokwane Local Municipality within Limpopo
- Coordinates: 23°54′S 29°26′E
- Country: South Africa
- Province: Limpopo
- District: Capricorn
- Seat: Polokwane
- Wards: 38

Government
  - Type: Municipal council
  - Mayor: John Mpe

Area
  - Total: 3,766 km^{2} (1,454 sq mi)

Population (2011)
  - Total: 628,999
  - Density: 167.0/km^{2} (432.6/sq mi)

Racial makeup (2011)
  - Black African: 92.9%
  - Coloured: 0.9%
  - Indian/Asian: 0.7%
  - White: 5.2%

First languages (2011)
  - Sepedi: 80.4%
  - Afrikaans: 5.4%
  - English: 3.2%
  - Tsonga: 2.8%
  - Other: 8.2%
- Time zone: UTC+2 (SAST)
- Municipal code: LIM354

Polokwane Municipality (Northern Sotho: Mmasepala wa Polokwane) is a local municipality within the Capricorn District Municipality, in the Limpopo province of South Africa. It shares its name with the city of Polokwane.

Polokwane Municipality accounts for 3% of the total surface area of Limpopo; however, over 10% of the population of Limpopo resides within its boundaries. The municipality serves as the economic hub of Limpopo and has the highest population density in the Capricorn District Municipality. In terms of its physical composition, Polokwane Municipality is 23% urbanised and 71% rural. The largest sector of the community resides in rural tribal villages, followed by urban settlements.

== Controversies ==
In October 2024 FF PLUS has opened a case against ghost workers overtime, that costed Polokwane Municipality 200 million Rands. The ANC in Limpopo suspended party member and the whistleblower for allegedly leaking documents of 700 million Rands in irregular tenders.

== Main places ==
The municipal spatial pattern reflects that of the historic apartheid city model, characterised by segregated settlement. At the centre of the area is the Polokwane economic hub, which comprises the central business district, industrial area, and a range of social services and well-established formal urban areas servicing the more affluent residents of Polokwane.

Situated on the outskirts in several clusters are less formal settlement areas, which are experiencing enormous influx from rural urban migration trends. These areas are in dire need of upgraded services and infrastructure, both social and engineering, and are struggling to cope with the informal influx of more and more people who want access to an improved quality and standard of living.

=== Main places ===
The 2001 census divided the municipality into the following main places:

Place	Code	Area (km^{2})	Population
Bjatladibja Dikolobe	91201	178.93	38,474
Ga-Dikgale	91202	169.79	39,966
Ditlou Machidi	91203	79.32	13,351
Ga-Mashashane	91204	2.12	1,667
Maja	91205	75.62	10,795
Makgoba	91206	1.03	906
Mankoeng	91207	117.97	37,996
Mankweng	91208	4.42	11,592
Mixed TA	91209	97.62	0
Mojapelo	91210	1.57	2,336
Molepo	91211	286.00	32,707
Moletji	91212	467.13	103,082
Moloto Solomon Kgabo	91213	0.87	1,019
Mothiba	91214	11.44	15,275
Pietersburg Part 1	91215	128.51	62,089
Pietersburg Part 2	91222	38.44	4,132
Seshego Part 1	91217	21.42	71,290
Seshego Part 2	91223	12.41	548
Thabamoopo	91218	6.05	5,799
Tholongwe	91219	162.63	31,694
Turfloop	91220	1.82	3,189
Remainder of the municipality	91216	1,910.06	20,352

== Politics ==
The municipal council consists of ninety members elected by mixed-member proportional representation. Forty-five councillors are elected by first-past-the-post voting in forty-five wards, while the remaining forty-five are chosen from party lists so that the total number of party representatives is proportional to the number of votes received. In the election of 1 November 2021 the African National Congress (ANC) won a majority of fifty-six seats on the council.

The following table shows the results of the election:

Party	Ward			List			Total seats
Party	Votes	%	Seats	Votes	%	Seats	Total seats
African National Congress	81,589	58.31	37	85,887	61.86	19	56
Economic Freedom Fighters	30,844	22.04	4	32,943	23.73	17	21
Democratic Alliance	10,079	7.20	4	10,331	7.44	3	7
Independent candidates	9,218	6.59	0				0
Freedom Front Plus	2,618	1.87	0	2,592	1.87	2	2
African Christian Democratic Party	835	0.60	0	1,057	0.76	1	1
Abantu Batho Congress	661	0.47	0	593	0.43	1	1
Magoshi Swaranang Movement	397	0.28	0	563	0.41	1	1
Congress of the People	469	0.34	0	476	0.34	1	1
16 other parties	3,220	2.30	0	4,406	3.17	0	0
Total	139,930	100.00	45	138,848	100.00	45	90
Valid votes	139,930	98.59		138,848	98.17		
Invalid/blank votes	2,004	1.41		2,588	1.83		
Total votes	141,934	100.00		141,436	100.00		
Registered voters/turnout	326,617	43.46		326,617	43.30		

== Demographics ==
As of 2007, the Polokwane Local Municipality was home to approximately 561,772 people. Growth figures from 1996 to 2001 showed that the municipal population increased by about 3.27% per year on average. Much of this growth is ascribed to an influx of people from other, more rural, municipal areas into Polokwane, where the perception of more employment and greater economic wealth exists.

79% of its households are using electricity for lighting, 62% for cooking, and 58% for heating.

In 2007, 94.1% of the population was Black African, 4.8% White, 1.1% Coloured, Indian or Asian.

=== Racial groups ===
Year	Total population	Percent Black	Percent White	Percentage Other (mostly Coloured or Asian)
2001	508,277	92.41%	6.1%	1.49%
2007	561,772 ▲	94.1% ▲	4.8% ▼	1.1% ▼

== Education ==
The Turfloop campus of the University of Limpopo is located in Mankweng and the Tshwane University of Technology has a satellite campus in Polokwane.

Although the municipality's overall level of education has improved slightly in recent years, only 24% of the population have attained a Grade 12 education, and only 5.7% have achieved a tertiary education qualification. As a result of low education levels and a largely unskilled population, large numbers of residents earn very little or no income, and poverty is a major problem in the municipal area.
