= Blouberg Local Municipality =

Coordinates: 23.1392°S 29.0013°E

Blouberg
- Local municipality
- Seal

- Location in Limpopo
- Country: South Africa
- Province: Limpopo
- District: Capricorn
- Seat: Senwabarwana
- Wards: 22

Government
  - Type: Municipal council
  - Mayor: Maseka Solomon Pheedi

Area
  - Total: 9,248 km^{2} (3,571 sq mi)

Population (2011)
  - Total: 162,629
  - Density: 17.59/km^{2} (45.55/sq mi)

Racial makeup (2011)
  - Black African: 99.0%
  - Coloured: 0.0%
  - Indian/Asian: 0.1%
  - White: 0.6%

First languages (2011)
  - Northern Sotho: 93.8%
  - Other: 6.2%
- Time zone: UTC+2 (SAST)
- Municipal code: LIM351

Blouberg Municipality (Northern Sotho: Mmasepala wa Blouberg) is a local municipality within the Capricorn District Municipality, in the Limpopo province of South Africa, bordering Botswana. It takes its name from the Blouberg (literally meaning "blue mountain" in Afrikaans), a mountain range located to the west of the western end of the Soutpansberg mountain range, north west of the town of Vivo. Blouberg is home to some of the most spectacular rock climbing in South Africa. The rock climbing destination is famous for its big wall natural climbing with route lengths up to 350m. The vegetation ranges from sub-tropical savanna at the base, to alpine near the summit.

== Demography ==
According to the 2001 census conducted by Statistics South Africa, the population of the greater Blouberg municipality was 161,314, of whom 99.4% are African, 0.5% white, 0.1% Coloured and 0.1% Asian.

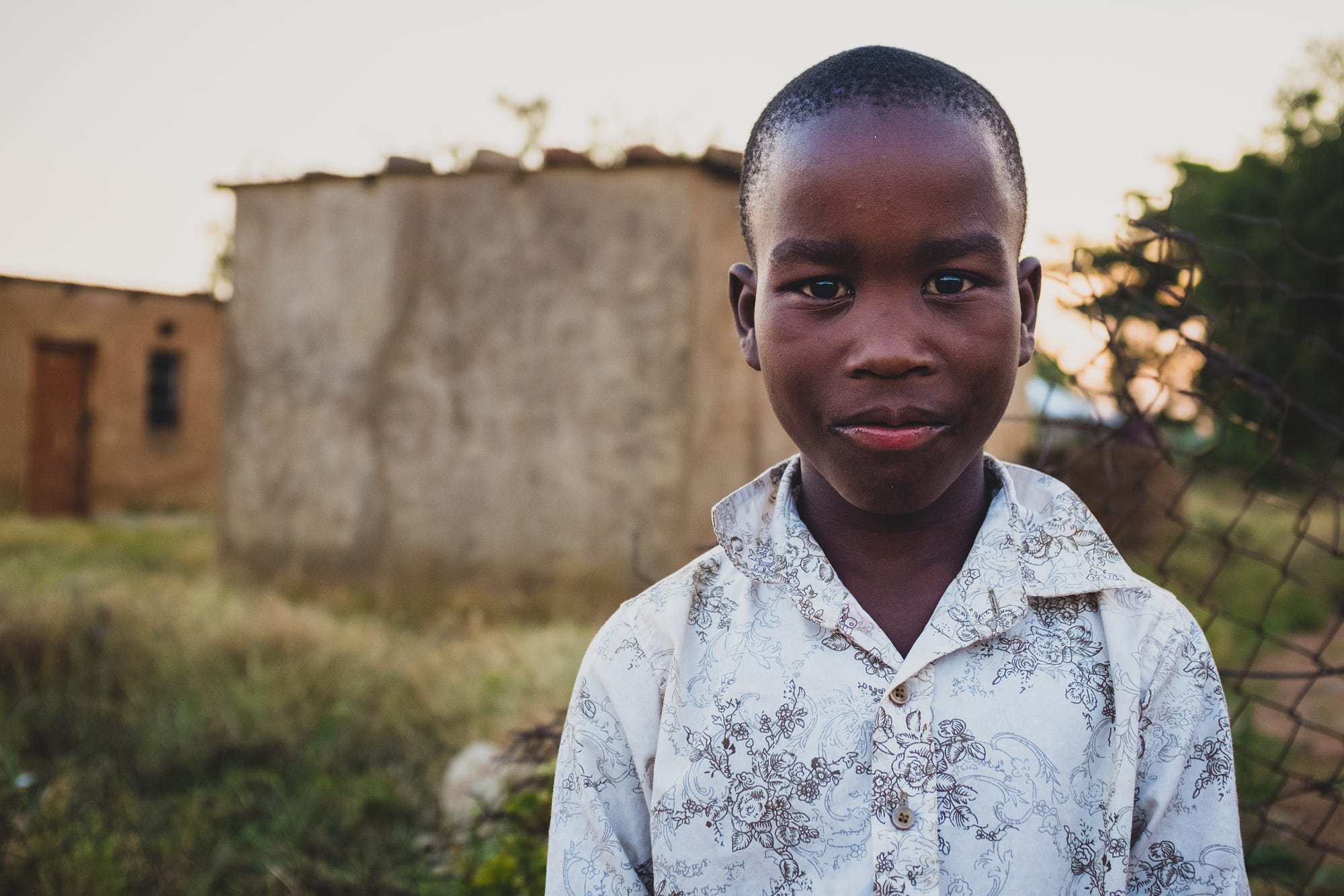
A boy in Blouberg amongst some dwellings

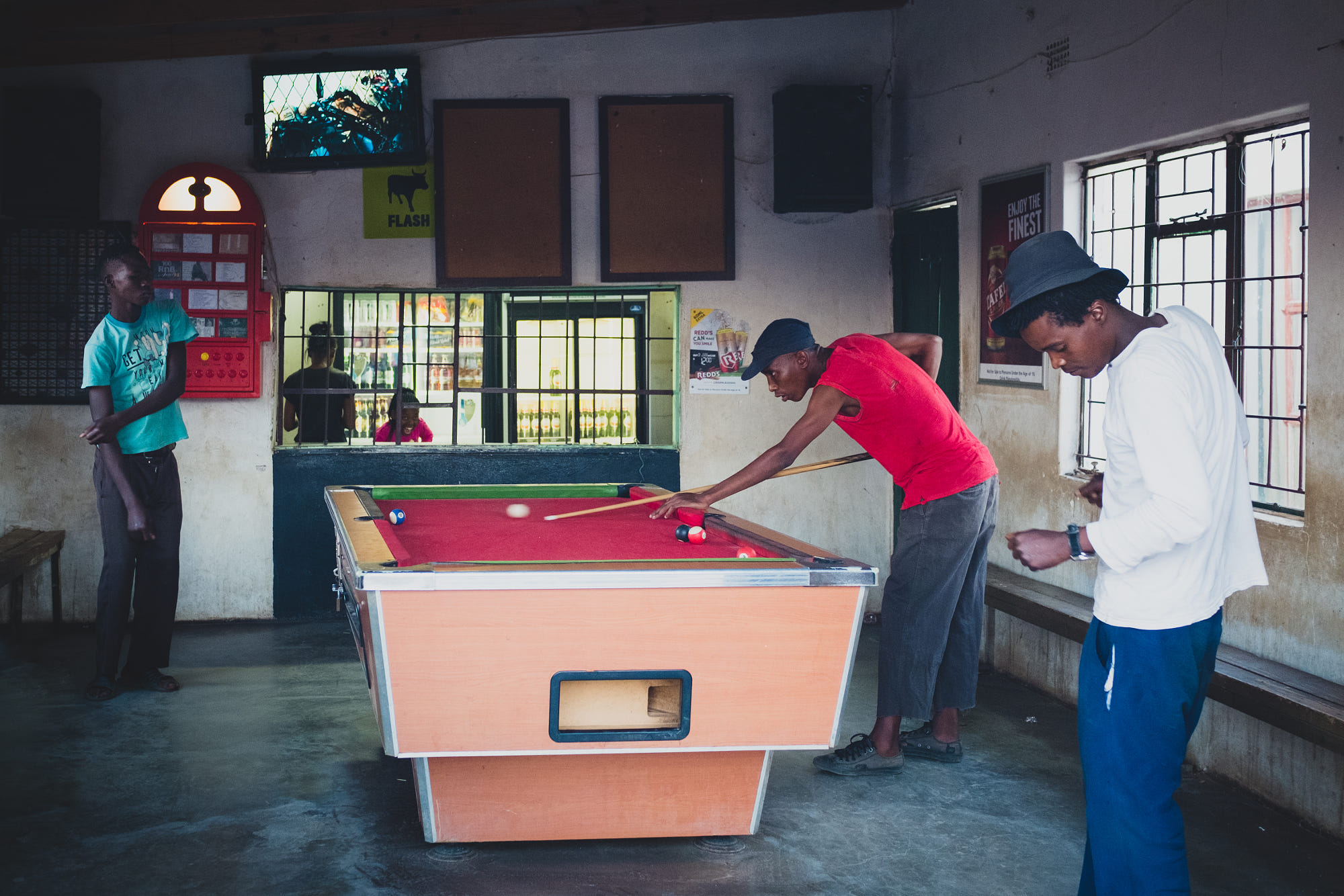
Men playing "pool" (snooker) in a bar in Blouberg, Limpopo.

== Main places ==
The 2001 census divided the municipality into the following main places:

Place	Code	Area (km^{2})	Population	Most spoken language
Alldays	90901	11.75	385	Northern Sotho
Bahanawa	90902	390.17	19,068	Northern Sotho
Bahanawa-Ba-Kibi	90903	163.78	7,763	Northern Sotho
Bochum Part 1	90912	4.33	8,501	Northern Sotho
Bochum Part 2	90905	182.33	15,911	Northern Sotho
Dichoeng	90906	58.29	17,347	Northern Sotho
Ga-Manthata	90907	1,335.47	72,175	Northern Sotho
Ga-Matlala	90908	180.83	8,697	Northern Sotho
Ga-Ramutla	90910	7.81	1,047	Northern Sotho
Remainder of the municipality	90904	2,198.72	5,539	Northern Sotho

== Politics ==
The municipal council consists of forty-four members elected by mixed-member proportional representation. Twenty-two councillors are elected by first-past-the-post voting in twenty-two wards, while the remaining twenty-two are chosen from party lists so that the total number of party representatives is proportional to the number of votes received. In the election of 1 November 2021 the African National Congress (ANC) won a majority of thirty-three seats on the council. The following table shows the results of the election.

Party	Ward			List			Total seats
Party	Votes	%	Seats	Votes	%	Seats	Total seats
African National Congress	26,230	71.54	22	26,887	74.42	11	33
Economic Freedom Fighters	5,679	15.49	0	5,878	16.27	7	7
Congress of the People	1,220	3.33	0	1,117	3.09	2	2
Democratic Alliance	945	2.58	0	956	2.65	1	1
Independent candidates	1,457	3.97	0				0
Abantu Batho Congress	362	0.99	0	322	0.89	1	1
11 other parties	770	2.10	0	971	2.69	0	0
Total	36,663	100.00	22	36,131	100.00	22	44
Valid votes	36,663	98.56		36,131	97.96		
Invalid/blank votes	537	1.44		754	2.04		
Total votes	37,200	100.00		36,885	100.00		
Registered voters/turnout	82,935	44.85		82,935	44.47		
