= Capricorn District Municipality =

Capricorn
- District municipality
- Seal

- Location in South Africa
- Coordinates: 23°53′S 29°26′E
- Country: South Africa
- Province: Limpopo
- Seat: Polokwane
- Local municipalities: List: Blouberg; Molemole; Polokwane; Lepelle-Nkumpi

Government
  - Type: Municipal council
  - Mayor: Mamedupi Teffo

Area
  - Total: 21,705 km^{2} (8,380 sq mi)

Population (2011)
  - Total: 1,261,463
  - Density: 58.119/km^{2} (150.53/sq mi)

Racial makeup (2016)
  - Black African: 97%
  - Coloured: 0.6%
  - Indian/Asian: 0.4%
  - White: 2%

First languages (2011)
  - Northern Sotho: 84.9%
  - Afrikaans: 3.0%
  - Tsonga: 2.6%
  - English: 2.0%
  - Other: 7.5%
- Time zone: UTC+2 (SAST)
- Municipal code: DC35

The Capricorn District Municipality (Northern Sotho: Mmasepala wa Selete wa Capricorn) is one of the 5 districts of the Limpopo province of South Africa. The district is named after the Tropic of Capricorn which runs through it. The capital is Polokwane. As of 2011, the vast majority of its 1,261,463 residents spoke Northern Sotho as their home language. The district code is DC35.

== Geography ==
=== Neighbours ===
Capricorn is surrounded by:

- Vhembe (DC34) to the north-east
- Mopani (DC33) east
- Sekhukhune (CBDC3) to the south
- Waterberg (DC36) to the west

=== Local municipalities ===
The district contains the following local municipalities:

Local municipality	Population	%	Dominant language
Polokwane	508 272	44.02%	Northern Sotho
Lepelle-Nkumpi	227 965	19.74%	Northern Sotho
Blouberg	161 326	13.97%	Northern Sotho
Aganang (was amalgamated into other municipalities in 2016)	147 686	12.79%	Northern Sotho
Molemole	109 442	9.48%	Northern Sotho

== Demographics ==
The following statistics are from the 2011 census.

Language	Population	%
Northern Sotho	1 055 421	84.90%
Afrikaans	36 901	2.97%
Tsonga	32 379	2.60%
English	25 177	2.03%
Ndebele	24 733	1.99%
Other	18 489	1.49%
Venda	17 477	1.41%
Zulu	11 671	0.94%
Sotho	8 170	0.66%
Tswana	6 990	0.56%
Xhosa	2 167	0.17%
Swati	1 418	0.11%

=== Gender ===
Gender	Population	%
Female	671 220	53.21%
Male	590 242	46.79%

=== Ethnic group ===
Ethnic group	Population	%
Black African	1 211 874	96.07%
White African	35 470	2.81%
Coloured	6 271	0.50%
Indian/Asian	5 234	0.41%

=== Age ===
Age	Population	%
000 - 004	130 815	11.33%
005 - 009	157 650	13.65%
010 - 014	165 920	14.37%
015 - 019	152 744	13.23%
020 - 024	99 157	8.59%
025 - 029	75 833	6.57%
030 - 034	63 494	5.50%
035 - 039	59 857	5.18%
040 - 044	49 348	4.27%
045 - 049	41 593	3.60%
050 - 054	34 780	3.01%
055 - 059	26 819	2.32%
060 - 064	27 205	2.36%
065 - 069	21 739	1.88%
070 - 074	19 736	1.71%
075 - 079	10 620	0.92%
080 - 084	10 541	0.91%
085 - 089	3 649	0.32%
090 - 094	1 978	0.17%
095 - 099	857	0.07%
100 plus	338	0.03%

== Politics ==
=== Election results ===
Election results for Capricorn in the South African general election, 2004.

- Population 18 and over: 601 852 [52.12% of total population]
- Total votes: 341 004 [29.53% of total population]
- Voting % estimate: 56.66% votes as a % of population 18 and over

Party	Votes	%
African National Congress	301 125	88.31%
Democratic Alliance	14 208	4.17%
United Democratic Movement	6 238	1.83%
African Christian Democratic Party	4 571	1.34%
Pan African Congress	3 143	0.92%
Azanian People's Organisation	2 921	0.86%
Freedom Front Plus	2 296	0.67%
New National Party	2 249	0.66%
Independent Democrats	764	0.22%
Inkhata Freedom Party	587	0.17%
United Christian Democratic Party	497	0.15%
NA	491	0.14%
EMSA	328	0.10%
SOPA	300	0.09%
PJC	277	0.08%
TOP	228	0.07%
UF	215	0.06%
CDP	213	0.06%
KISS	125	0.04%
NLP	121	0.04%
Minority Front	107	0.03%
Total	341 004	100.00%

== See also ==
- Municipal Demarcation Board
