= Marivate =

Marivate is a surname. Notable people with the surname include:

- Charles Daniel Marivate (1924–2019), South African medical doctor, son of Daniel Cornel
- C. T. D. Marivate (1927–2020), South African writer and academic, son of Daniel Cornel
- Martin Marivate (1934-2020), world-renowned South African obstetrician and gynaecologist, son of Daniel Cornel
- Daniel Cornel Marivate (1897–1989), South African writer and composer
- Vukosi Marivate, South African researcher, grandson of Charles Daniel
