= Salema =

Salema may refer to:

== People ==
- Anziza Salema, singer from Madagascar
- Joseph C. Salema, former Chief of Staff of New Jersey
- Salema Kasdaoui, Tunisian football player

== Places ==
=== India ===
- Salema, India, a village in India
- Salema Bazar, a village in India

=== Portugal ===
- Salema, Portugal, a village and beach in Portugal

== Fish ==
- Salema porgy, a species of sea bream

== See also ==
- Salemas, an ancestor of Ezra in the Bible
- Cave of Salemas, a Paleolithic cultural site in Portugal
