= Greater Giyani Local Municipality =

Greater Giyani
- Local municipality
- Seal

- Location in Limpopo
- Coordinates: 23°25′S 30°45′E
- Country: South Africa
- Province: Limpopo
- District: Mopani
- Seat: Giyani
- Wards: 30

Government
  - Type: Municipal council

Area
  - Total: 4,172 km^{2} (1,611 sq mi)

Population (2011)
  - Total: 244,217
  - Density: 58.54/km^{2} (151.6/sq mi)

Racial makeup (2011)
  - Black African: 99.5%
  - Coloured: 0.1%
  - Indian/Asian: 0.3%
  - White: 0.1%

First languages (2011)
  - Tsonga: 90.8%
  - Sepedi: 3.8%
  - Sotho: 2.6%
  - Other: 2.8%
- Time zone: UTC+2 (SAST)
- Municipal code: LIM331

Greater Giyani Municipality (Tsonga: Masipala wa Greater Giyani) is a local municipality within the Mopani District Municipality, in the Limpopo province of South Africa. The seat is Giyani.

== Main places ==
The 2001 census divided the municipality into the following main places:

Place	Code	Area (km^{2})	Population	Most spoken language
Giyani Part 2	90111	21.53	32,673	Tsonga
Giyani Part 3	90112	0.24	415	Tsonga
Hlaneki	90102	365.04	23,402	Tsonga
Mabunda	90103	1.63	3,861	Tsonga
Makhuva	90104	131.90	3,615	Tsonga
Modjadji	90105	4.03	4,373	Tsonga
Msengi	90106	87.74	8,279	Tsonga
Ndengeza	90107	82.98	10,751	Tsonga
Nkuri	90108	5.35	7,052	Tsonga
Nkomo	90109	3.92	4,029	Tsonga
Shiviti	90110	815.97	39,610	Tsonga
Remainder of the municipality (Giyani Part 1)	90101	1,444.47	99,343	Tsonga

== Politics ==
The municipal council consists of sixty-two members elected by mixed-member proportional representation. Thirty-one councillors are elected by first-past-the-post voting in thirty-one wards, while the remaining thirty-one are chosen from party lists so that the total number of party representatives is proportional to the number of votes received. In the election of 1 November 2021 the African National Congress (ANC) won a majority of forty-seven seats on the council. The following table shows the results of the election.

Party	Ward			List			Total seats
Party	Votes	%	Seats	Votes	%	Seats	Total seats
African National Congress	44,400	72.71	29	46,550	76.72	18	47
Economic Freedom Fighters	4,349	7.12	0	4,789	7.89	5	5
Independent candidates	4,713	7.72	2				2
African People's Convention	2,064	3.38	0	1,688	2.78	2	2
Democratic Alliance	1,020	1.67	0	1,142	1.88	1	1
Forum for Service Delivery	730	1.20	0	1,303	2.15	1	1
Mopani Independent Movement	1,206	1.98	0	793	1.31	1	1
Patriotic Alliance	637	1.04	0	624	1.03	1	1
Ximoko Party	212	0.35	0	1,005	1.66	1	1
National Independent Party	408	0.67	0	482	0.79	1	1
13 other parties	1,324	2.17	0	2,299	3.79	0	0
Total	61,063	100.00	31	60,675	100.00	31	62
Valid votes	61,063	98.23		60,675	97.71		
Invalid/blank votes	1,098	1.77		1,425	2.29		
Total votes	62,161	100.00		62,100	100.00		
Registered voters/turnout	127,782	48.65		127,782	48.60		

== South African general election, 2014 ==
Results of the National Assembly election of 2014 for Greater Giyani Local Municipality:

- ANC 89.2%
- EFF 5.3%
- DA 3.2%
- ACDP 0.5%
- COPE 0.4%
- AIC 0.4%
- APC 0.3%
- UDM 0.1%
- AGANG SA 0.1%
- PAC 0.1%
- FF+ 0.1%
- IFP 0.1%
- UCDP 0.0%
- AZAPO 0.0%
- WASP 0.0%
- NFP 0.0%
- UBUNTU 0.0%
- PA 0.0%
- BRA 0.0%
- KISS 0.0%
- PAM 0.0%
- ICOSA 0.0%
- FN 0.0%
- MF 0.0%
- UNICO 0.0%
- FINLA 0.0%
- PAL 0.0%
- KGM 0.0%
- Al Jama-ah 0.0%
