= C. T. D. Marivate =

South African writer and academic (1927–2020)

Member of the National Assembly
- In office October 1996 – June 1999

Personal details
- Born: Cornelius Tennyson Daniel Marivate; 10 April 1927 Valdezia, Transvaal; Union of South Africa
- Died: 4 December 2020 (aged 93)
- Party: African National Congress
- Relations: Charles Daniel Marivate (brother)
- Parent: Daniel Cornel Marivate
- Education: University of South Africa (PhD)

Cornelius Tennyson Daniel Marivate (10 April 1927 – 4 December 2020) was a South African politician, academic and writer, known for his work in Tsonga. He won the South African Literary Awards Lifetime Achievement Award in 2019.

Marivate worked at the University of South Africa (UNISA) from 1963 to 1992. He served briefly in the government of the Gazankulu bantustan and later represented the African National Congress (ANC) in the National Assembly from 1996 to 1999.

== Early life and career ==
Marivate was the second-born son of Daniel Marivate, a renowned South African composer and writer. He was born on 10 April 1927 and raised at a Swiss mission station in Valdesia in the former Transvaal province, where his father was a teacher and pastor. He himself began teaching in 1948 at a nearby primary school, while studying by correspondence for his school-leaving certificate.

After he completed his bachelor's degree at UNISA in 1963, he was invited to join the university's African languages department as UNISA's first Xitsonga-native lecturer. Beginning as a lecturer and ultimately becoming head of department, he remained at UNISA until his retirement in 1992. During that time he completed his master's degree, on Tsonga folk tales, and in 1982 his doctorate, on ideophone and onomatopoeia in African languages. He also completed a diploma in music through the London School of Music.

== Political career ==
Marivate was occasionally involved in politics during apartheid. In 1978, he successfully campaigned for election to a seat in the Gazankulu Legislative Assembly, but withdrew before he was sworn in. Later he served as a minister in the Gazankulu government under Chief Minister Samuel Dickenson Nxumalo, while also serving as a delegate to the Convention for a Democratic South Africa.

After the end of apartheid in 1994, he was appointed as a member of the Public Service Commission in the new Northern Province (later renamed Limpopo); the main task of the commission was to reintegrate the Gazankulu, Lebowa, and Venda homelands with parts of the Transvaal provincial administration. In October 1996, he was sworn in to the National Assembly, the lower house of the new South African Parliament, where he filled a casual vacancy in an ANC seat. He advocated for a political programme involving self-reliance, reconciliation, and cooperation among political parties. He left the Parliament after the next general election in 1999.

== Music and literature ==
Marivate wrote several books in Tsonga, including Jim Xilovekelo (1965) and Mpambulwa Wa Switlhokovetselo (1983), and he translated others from English, including a book of Tsonga folktales. In 2019, he won the South African Literary Awards's Lifetime Achievement Award for his body of work in Tsonga. Like his father, he was also involved in composing and conducting choral music.

== Personal life and death ==
He was married to Stephina and had seven children. He was an adherent of the Moral Rearmament movement and a member of the Evangelical Presbyterian Church. He died on 4 December 2020, aged 93.
