= Vaiavy Chila =

Malagasy vocalist and composer

- Born: Madagascar
- Genres: Salegy, malesa, kawitry
- Occupation(s): Singer, songwriter
- Instrument: Voice

Vaiavy Chila, also known as Chila, is a vocalist and composer of salegy music from the northern coastal region of Madagascar. The most popular female salegy artist of the last decade, she is commonly called the Princess of Salegy in the Malagasy press, in deference to the first female salegy superstar and "Queen of Salegy", Ninie Doniah. Early in her career she performed as a dancer for Tianjama and Jaojoby Junior, a group composed of the adult children of superstar Jaojoby, the "King of Salegy". Embarking on a solo career in 2004, she released four albums over the next decade: Mahangôma, Walli Walla, Nahita Zaho Anao Niany, and Zaho Tia Anao Vadiko.

Chila refers to her musical style as salegy mahangôma. She often performs accompanied by over 20 artists, including backing musicians and dancers. In 2013 the artist launched an international tour to promote the release of her fifth album.

Vaiavy Chila "Walli Wallah" (2006)
Salegy as performed by Vaiavy Chila

== See also ==
- Music of Madagascar
