= Dr George Mukhari Hospital =

Hospital in Pretoria, Gauteng, South Africa

Dr George Mukhari Academic Hospital

Geography
- Location: Ga-Rankuwa, City of Tshwane Metropolitan Municipality, Gauteng, South Africa
- Coordinates: 25°37′11″S 28°00′42″E

Organisation
- Care system: Public
- Type: Community
- Affiliated university: Sefako Makgatho Health Sciences University

Services
- Beds: 1652

Links
- Lists: Hospitals in South Africa

Dr George Mukhari Hospital is an Academic Hospital situated in the west of the City of Tshwane near the township of Ga-Rankuwa. The previous name was Ga-Rankuwa Hospital. It is a teaching facility for the Sefako Makgatho Health Sciences University formerly known as Medical University of Southern Africa/University of Ga-Rankuwa Medunsa Campus. It is the second largest hospital in South Africa.
