= Nozinja Lodge =

Studio album by Nozinja
- Released: June 1, 2015
- Genre: Shangaan electro; electronic
- Length: 42:44
- Label: Warp
- Producer: Nozinja

Singles from Nozinja Lodge
- 1. "Tsekeleke" Released: August 11, 2014

Nozinja Lodge is the debut studio album by South African artist Nozinja, released on Warp on June 1, 2015. It peaked at number 13 on Billboard's World Albums chart.

== Critical reception ==
Professional ratings
Aggregate scores
Source	Rating
Metacritic	78/100
Review scores
Source	Rating
AllMusic	4/5 stars
Clash	7/10
Exclaim!	7/10
The Irish Times	3/5 stars
The List	3/5 stars
Pitchfork	6.9/10
PopMatters	7/10 stars
Resident Advisor	4.1/5

At Metacritic, which assigns a weighted average score out of 100 to reviews from mainstream critics, the album received an average score of 78, based on 10 reviews, indicating "generally favorable reviews".

Andrew Ryce of Resident Advisor gave the album a 4.1 out of 5, commenting that "Nozinja Lodge is joyous, colourful dance music from one of the electronic scene's most eccentric and promising personalities." Paul Simpson of AllMusic gave the album 4 stars out of 5, writing, "His tracks still feature high-speed rhythms with marimba-like digital percussion and bright, playful synthesizers, setting the stage for smooth, sensuous lead vocals."

Rolling Stone placed it at number 13 on their "20 Best EDM and Electronic Albums of 2015" list. Fact included it on their "30 Best Album Covers of 2015" list.

== Track listing ==
All tracks are written by Nozinja

No.	Title	Length
1.	"Nwa Baloyi"	4:59
2.	"Mitshetsho We Zindaba"	3:48
3.	"Baby Do U Feel Me"	3:46
4.	"Xihukwani"	3:07
5.	"Tsekeleke"	4:47
6.	"Vamaseve Vatswelani"	5:12
7.	"Nyamsoro"	3:40
8.	"N'wanga I Jesu"	3:35
9.	"Vomaseve Hina"	4:31
10.	"Wo Va Jaha"	5:19
Total length:		42:44

== Personnel ==
Credits adapted from liner notes.

- Nozinja – production, recording
- Mark Gergis – post production
- Mandy Parnell – mastering
- Bafana Kunene – vocals (1)
- Tiyiselani Vomaseve – vocals (2, 6, 9)
- White Moja – vocals (5)
- Sjineto – vocals (7)
- Ben Maluleke – vocals (8)
- Qoli Kunene – vocals (10)
- Oval-X Eternal – artwork
- Chris Saunders – cover photography
- Nico Krijno – inside photography

== Charts ==
Chart	Peak position
US World Albums (Billboard)	13
