= DJ Spoko =

South African record producer and DJ

- Also known as: SycoKillah
- Born: Marvin Ramalepe; Tzaneen, South Africa
- Origin: Atteridgeville, Gauteng
- Died: March 14, 2018
- Genres: Bacardi house; house; hip hop; electronic music
- Occupations: Producer; DJ
- Labels: Ghetto Boyz Entertainment; Lit City Trax; True Panther Sounds
- Formerly of: Fantasma

Marvin Ramalepe, widely known as DJ Spoko was a South African record producer and DJ. He gained fame for co-producing DJ Mujava's, "Township Funk" as well as his pioneering work in bacardi house.

== Early life ==
Spoko was born and raised in Tzaneen, Limpopo before relocating to Atteridgeville situated west of Pretoria. Himself and his brother made the move to Atteridgeville in search of their father.

As a child, DJ Spoko earned the nickname "Ghost" while residing in Ghost Town, the neighborhood which was home to the Atteridgeville cemetery. Thus, Spoko was meant to be interpreted as "spook". At the age of 12, Spoko began producing songs in his home using pirated drum-loop software.

I just banged those drums. Hard! No bass, just drums – bang... I hate soft music, I just love noise.

— DJ Spoko, "Township tech: South Africans raving at apartheid’s afterparty", The Guardian, 2015

== Career ==
=== 2008–2010:"Township Funk" and "Mugwanti" ===
Following his move to Atteridgeville, he embarked on his musical career and initiated his studies in sound engineering under the tutelage of Nozinja, the innovator of Shangaan electro. In 2008, he garnered critical acclaim for co-producing Mujava's "Township Funk" which was released on Warp. The song marked an unforeseen crossover, blending elements of kwaito with bacardi house. It was featured on BBC Radio 1 show Worldwide in July 2008, and it became a favorite on DJ Pete Tong’s Essential Selection. David Guetta included the song in one of his F*** Me I'm Famous mix sets. Additionally, it became one of the most frequently played tracks in Fabric’s mix series.

A little over 10 years ago now, an obscure song from Pretoria, South Africa flipped dancefloors across the Northern Hemisphere on their ears. It was called "Township Funk," and if you know it, you are probably hearing it in your head right now. The hook is like no other: a giddy, two-note riff that abruptly goes zig-zagging across the spectrum, with greased-up synths glowing fluorescent over snapping snares. The kind of tune that stops listeners in their tracks, “Township Funk” is not just an earworm but an earworm that has grown feet, learned to juggle, and taken up bungee jumping.

— Philip Sherburne, "The Strange Story of “Township Funk,” The Unlikely Hit That Helped South African Dance Music Go Global", Pitchfork, 2019

In 2010, DJ Spoko and Mujava released, "Mugwanti".

=== 2014–2016: Musical collective, Fantasma and hip hop debut ===
In 2014, DJ Spoko, Spoek Mathambo, guitarist Andre Geldenhuys, drummer Michael Buchanan and Bhekisenzo Cele formed a collective known as Fantasma. Drawing from a diverse array of influences Fantasma combined maskandi, Shangaan electro, hip-hop, punk rock, electronica, psychedelic rock and other genres. Spoko performed at OkayAfrica Presents: Black Coffee, DJ Spoko and Electrafrique on the SummerStage in, Central Park. In 2015, Spoko performed at Nozinja's headline show during the Red Bull Music Academy festival's, Electronic Africa in Williamsburg, Brooklyn. DJ Spoko made his debut in hip-hop by releasing the EP Falling Se'sfikile under the alias SycoKillah. Spoko referred to the genre of music as kasi rap. On August 12, 2016, DJ Spoko and DJ Mujava marked their return to music following years, with the release, of a bacardi house extended play titled, I.M.I. (Intelligent Mental Institution), through True Panther Sounds.

== Bacardi house ==
In the 2000s, DJ Spoko, DJ Mujava, House Station, Mzo Bullet and several others pioneered bacardi house (also bacardi), popularly referred to as "sgubhu saPitori" featuring tracks such as "Township Funk", "Tobetsa", "Casablanca" and "Mugwanti". Bacardi house is a subgenre of kwaito and house music that blends percussive elements with pop-synth melodies. Bacardi was described as "a fusion of martial military-style snares, wobbly, disorientated synth sounds and gruff call-and-response vocals" by Dean Bein of True Panther Sounds.

DJ Spoko is recognized for his influence on gqom through bacardi house, however gqom's origins extend beyond bacardi. Durban kwaito, which predated bacardi and was often conflated and confused with Afro-house and gqom, was a major precursor to gqom, shaping its distinct sound. It was also believed that Durban kwaito ("as gqom"), influenced bacardi. The practice of sharing or blasting music via taxis, which DJ Spoko engaged in, has been a longstanding tradition in South Africa and particularly the city of Durban for decades. Given the Zulu ethnic group's prominence and their role in the taxi industry in South Africa, although bacardi was one of the sounds which were prevalent during gqom's inception, gqom is distinct from bacardi and its roots are deeply tied to the city of Durban's music scene and cultural context long before bacardi house emerged.

== Illness and death ==
In October 2015, news reports surfaced that DJ Spoko fell ill during his European tour. Subsequently, he underwent treatment for tuberculosis at the Queen Elizabeth University Hospital in Glasgow, Scotland. Spoko died on March 14, 2018. Cause of death, unknown.

== Artistry ==
DJ Spoko's fascination with music ignited during his time in Soweto. Upon hearing about Shangaanis experimenting with electronic sounds he delved into their world. Spending three years immersed in studying musical styles, audio engineering and production he honed his skills. Beyond pioneering the bacardi house movement Spoko ventured into hip hop, rap, house variants and electronic music. Moreover, Spoko embraced fusion music with Fantasma, the musical collective he was a member of.

== Discography ==
- Ghost Town (2013)
- WAR GOD (2014)
- Special Edition (2015)
- Falling Se'sfikile
- I.M.I (2016)
- Dirty Dancing
