= Shangaan electro =

South African dance movement and musical style

- Stylistic origins: Electronic music, Tsonga disco, Kwaito, House music
- Cultural origins: South Africa
- Typical instruments: Synthesizer, drum machine, modified electronics, sampler, sequencer

Tsonga electro is a dance movement and musical style born from a 21st-century reboot of local folk traditions in South African townships, Tsonga Disco and Kwaito House. The movement has been spearheaded by DJ Khwaya and the producer Nozinja in recent years, who has turned it into an iconic Afro-futurist strain of electronic dance music. Tsonga electro is also called "Shangaan Electro" in the Limpopo province of South Africa and was described as "the footwork-y highlife sound" by Red Bull Media House's, writer Chris Parkin.

== History ==
Previous to releases by Honest Jon's in the late 2000s, the Shangaan Electro movement has a vast catalogue of cassettes, CD-Rs and DVDs released locally in South Africa via Nozinja Productions. The style has since gained international attention through the release of the compilation Shangaan Electro: New Wave Dance Music From South Africa via Honest Jon's which showcased the production work of Nozinja and the vocal/dance crews he had established. The record and the attention it threw on various YouTube clips of the dancers in action led to a succession of performances at Sónar festival, Berghain and elsewhere across Europe, Australia and Africa.

=== List of Tsonga Electro releases ===
- "Ndhuma" by Mualusie (2015, Shangaanbang)
- "Malamulele/Khombo/Tshamiseka" by Mualusie (2015, Shangaanbang)
- "Volume 2" by Da Multi Snake (2015, Shangaanbang)
- "N" by Da Multi Snake (2014, Shangaanbang)
- "Volume 1" by Da Multi Snake (2014, Shangaanbang)
- "Heke Heke / Hoza" by Xitsonga Dance (2013, Jialong)
- "Bafana Bafana / Dyambu" by Tshetsha Boys (2013, Jialong)
- "Shangaan Shake" (2012, Honest Jon's)
- Tshe-Tsha (2008, Nozinja Music)
- "Ndzi Teke Riendzo" by Foster Manganyi (2008, Honest Jon's)
- Shangaan Electro - New Wave Dance Music From South Africa (2010, Honest Jon's)
- Pollyn - "How Small We Are (Nozinja's Shangaan Electro Remix)" from How Small We Are EP (2011)
- Pollyn - "How Small We Are (Nozinja's Shangaan Electro Version)" from Pieces in Patterns EP (2012)
- Nacho Patrol - "Lineas Angola (Nozinja's Shangaan Electro 'Sansana' Remix)" from Lineas Angola (2013)
- Nkata Mawewe - Khulumani
- Xitsonga Dance - Vomaseve Vol. 6
- Lucy Shivambo - Wamina hi Wihi
- Tshe-Tsha Boys - Xolo / Ka Buti
- Tshe-Tsha Boys - Tshe-Tsha
- Tiyiselani Vomaseve - Vanghana
- Ni Vona Khombo - Mancingelani Vol. 2
- Vuyelwa - Mosimana Wa Dikgom
- Mapostoli - Mapostoli
- Mario Chauke - Avanga Hembi Vol. 3
- Tshe-Tsha Boys - ni famba na wena
- MC Mabasa Na Shigombe Sisters (No. 17) - Ritaboxeka Thumba

=== Expansion of the scene ===
Shangaan Electro has found a particular kinship with other forward thinking electronic producers and DJs, including Caribou, The Knife, Mount Kimbie and Pearson Sound. A series of 12”s took these links with other electronic music styles further with Theo Parrish, Rashad & Spinn, Ricardo Villalobos, Hype Williams and others remixing Shangaan tracks. Then in 2013, two brand new Nozinja cuts (under various pseudonyms) followed on Dan Snaith's (Caribou, Daphni) Jiaolong label. In 2014, Shangaanbang, a UK-based label specializing in Shangaan Electro put out their first release 'Volume 1' from Limpopo-based artist Da Multi Snake.

== Characteristics ==
The Guardian describes the music as a "harder, faster, electronicised" version of a traditional Tsonga music, itself characterised by fluid guitar lines and drumming popularised by artists such as Thomas Chauke and one-time Paul Simon collaborator General MD Shirinda, who appeared on 1986's Graceland.

Created primarily for dance, Nozinja's productions have pushed the speed of the music up to 190bpm, and with less focus on bass than other dance music styles, Shangaan electro has a "rapid-fire kineticism" that is stylistically linked to Footwork.

== Dance ==
Shangaan, the name given to the people of Gaza Empire are now part of The Tsonga people, a diverse population that includes the Shangaans, Thonga, Tonga and several smaller ethnic groups which influence the Shangaan Electro dance such are the footwork dance ceremonies, Xibelani dance or the Pantsula dance, a more urban street culture emerged in the 1950s and 1960s. The performers are often wearing costumes and masks resembling fertility rituals where they use it to better interact with the public leading most of times to a great group communion on stage.

== See also ==
- DJ Spoko
- Gqom
