= Mabunda =

Mabunda is a surname. Notable people with the surname include:

- Gonçalo Mabunda (born 1975), Mozambican artist
- Jeannine Mabunda (born 1964), Congolese lawyer and politician
- Samuel Mabunda (born 1988), South African footballer
