= DJ Brian =

South African radio personality

DJ Brian Rikhotso
- Born: Giyani Brian Rikhotso; 1 January 1980 (age 46); Soweto, South Africa
- Occupation: Radio DJ
- Years active: 2000–present
- Presenting career
- Show: Phaphama Breakfast Show
- Station: Munghana Lonene FM
- Time slot: 06:00 - 09:00 weekdays
- Style: Morning Drive show
- Country: South Africa
- Previous shows: Dzumba na mina, Midzumba ya Afrika, Phensa-Phensa, Phaphama, Vantshwa va hleva
- Website: http://www.munghanalonenefm.co.za

Giyani Brian "DJ Brian" Rikhotso (born 1 January 1980) is a South African radio personality and entrepreneur. He broadcasts on Munghana Lonene FM, Club Dj. As of April 2015, Rikhotso co-hosts the morning drive show.

== Early life ==
Brian Rikhotso was born in Soweto, South Africa. He later moved to Bolobedu next to Tzaneen, Limpopo. He attended Matshwi Primary School, Bolobedu and Mokope Senior Secondary. He trained to be a journalist at Technikon Pretoria (now Tshwane University of Technology).

== Career ==
Rikhotso has hosted multiple shows on Munghana Lonene FM. He joined the station in 2000 as a stand-in presenter, mainly covering graveyards shifts while finishing his studies. He later presented the African World Music Show Mindhzumba ya Afrika, which made a name for him. In 2003 he started presenting the afternoon drive show Vaxumi, swapping days with Conny Mashimbye. He earned a breakfast show slot in 2005, a programme he kept till his resignation in 2007.

In 2008 he rejoined the station to co-host the breakfast show Phaphama with Sydney Baloyi. In 2009 the team was joined by Tebogo Jacko Magubane as producer, leading the show to new heights. Rikhotso moved to Afternoon Drive and paired with Thembzana Reloaded and Nyiko Sithole as the sports presenter until April 2015. In 2015 he moved back to the breakfast show. In 2018 he moved to host the Midday show Dzumba na Mina.

=== Significance ===
At age 23, he was the first presenter at the station to win an award (Presenter of the year) for presenting two weekend programmes. He exposed the listeners to a new blend of African music, mainly from SADC countries. His taste led him to become the first at the station to play artist such as Salala from Madagascar, Koffi Olomide Fally Ipupa Papa Wemba, Kanda Bongo Man, from Democratic Republic of the Congo and musicians from Mozambique such as Zico, Tabassily, Mr Bow. He has a following on social media, including on YouTube. Rikhotso has released 3 albums. In 2014, he made a mark when he featured Tsalanang-Inspector Mkhaba performing "Bafikile". This hit single was later compiled on DJ Cleo's Eskhaleni 9. His music video was played on local and national TV stations in RSA and other neighbouring countries in Africa. In July 2021 DJ Brian became the social media manager for Marumo Gallants FC ( A football club in the PSL). He became Sports Photographer of the Year in 2024 during the Limpopo Sports Awards held on 21 January 2025.

== Personal life ==
Rikhotso was arrested on February 9, 2007, but the case was dismissed due to lack of evidence.
