= Amatongaland =

Home to Amatonga sub-group, bordering Lebombo Mountains

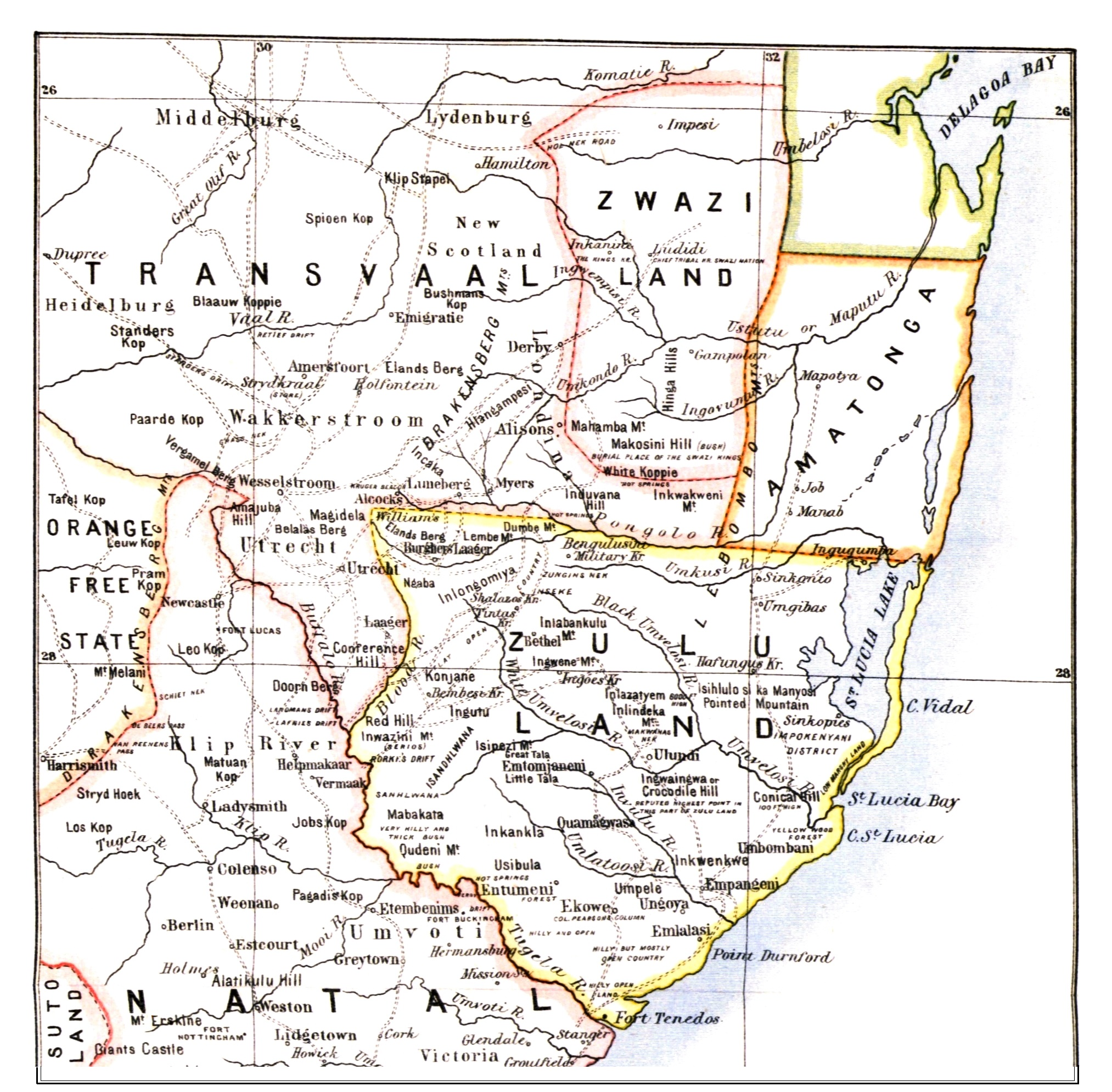
Amatongaland in 1879

Amatongaland, or Tongaland, was an independent kingdom of Tsonga people, located in the far north of what would become the Natal colony, bordered on the west by the Lebombo Mountains. The country is a continuation of the lowlands of northern Zululand, not rising above 300 ft.

The district comprised 1280 mi^{2} (2060 km^{2}). The inhabitants were the Amatonga sub-group of the Tsonga people.

British suzerainty or overlordship was asserted by a treaty made with Queen Regent Zambilli of Amatongaland in 1887. The population at the time was estimated at 38,000, mainly Amatonga (alternative name Maputa). In 1889, the British set-up a commission which defined the boundary between Amatongaland and Zululand, the latter territory having been annexed as a British protectorate in 1887.

The possession of Tongaland was strongly desired by the Boers since it would furnish them an outlet to the Indian Ocean. In order to disrupt that plan Great Britain placed Tongaland under British protection on 11 June 1895.

The portion of Amatongaland which came under the British protectorate lay between the Portuguese territory in the north and the north-east frontier of Zululand, in the south. British administration was set-up by an Order in Council dated 29 June 29, 1896 empowering a Special Commissioner of Amatongaland or Maputaland to appoint executive and judicial officers for the territory, and to legislate by Proclamation, having regard in civil matters to native law. The Special Commissioner was the also the Governor of Zululand, who was also Governor of the colony of Natal.

Amatongaland was annexed to Zululand on 27 December 1897, and then promptly annexed to Natal along with Zululand the same year.
