= Nozinja =

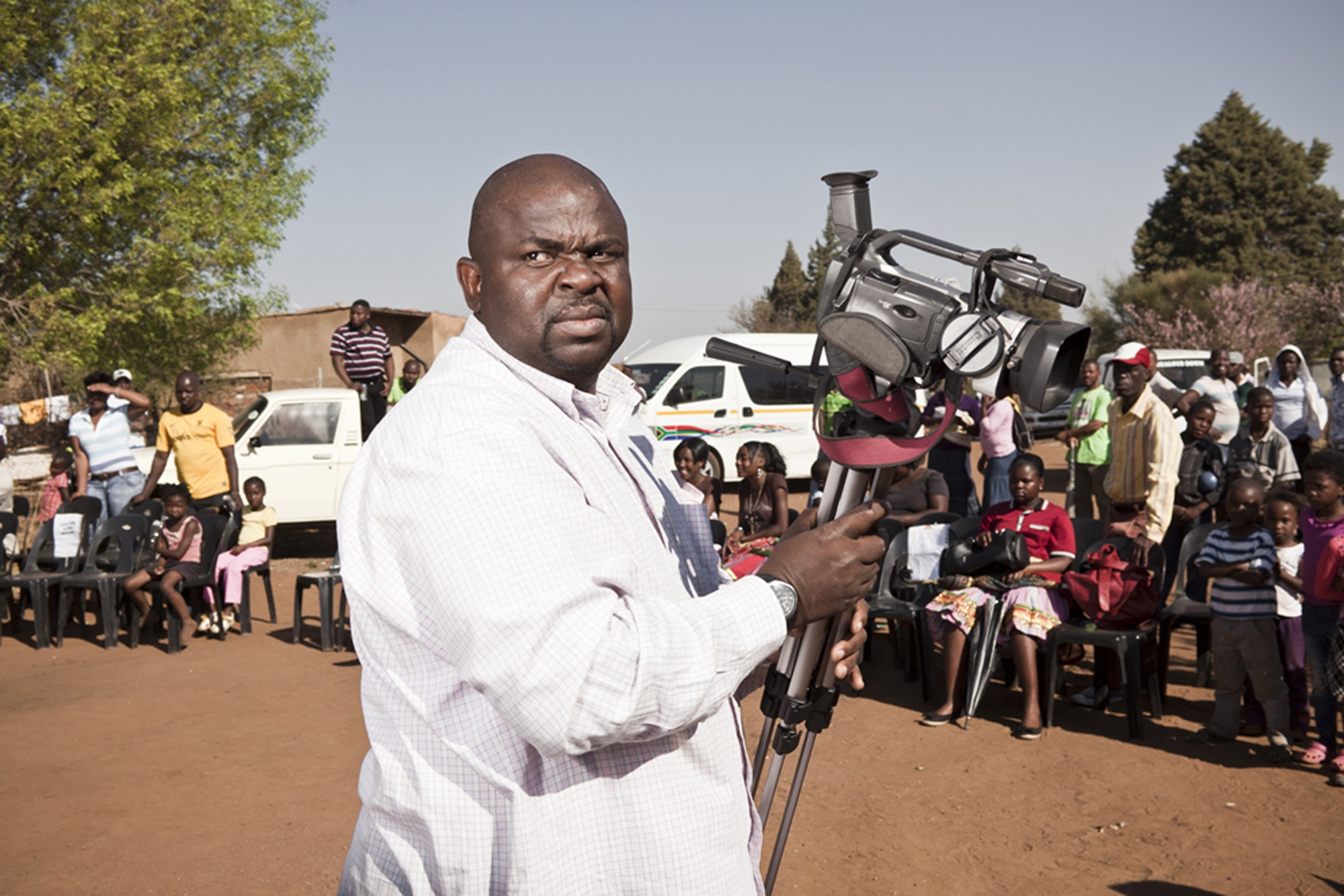

Background information
- Born: Richard Mthetwa; Giyani, Limpopo
- Genres: Electronic, Shangaan electro, Tsonga disco, Kwaito, house
- Occupations: Record producer, musician, DJ
- Years active: 2004–present
- Labels: Warp, Honest Jon's, Jialong, Nozinja Music
- Website: sites.google.com/site/nozinjamusic/

Nozinja is a South African musician, producer and DJ, credited with the creation and popularisation of the 'shangaan electro' genre of African dance music, influenced by traditional folk, Tsonga disco, Kwaito house and township backstreet dance styles from the Limpopo region of South Africa.

== Biography ==
Born Richard Mthetwa in Giyani, Limpopo, Nozinja has since moved to Soweto and spent time running a string of successful mobile phone repair shops before noticing the size of crowds at local Sowetan Shangaan dances and becoming the producer, artist, video director and promoter of the Shangaan style for which he is now known.

Shangaan electro was born in Soweto, however takes its name from the Shangaan people who moved to Soweto largely for work, including Nozinja, also known simply as 'Dog'. The 'shangaan electro' sound has found a particular kinship with electronic producers and DJs such as Caribou, Ben UFO, Mount Kimbie and Pearson Sound consistently championing the style. A high-profile series of 12"s on Honest Jon's capitalised on this with Theo Parrish, Rashad & Spinn, Ricardo Villalobos, Hype Williams and others remixing Shangaan tracks, which were subsequently compiled on the 'Shangaan Shake' double CD. 2013 saw the release of 2 brand new Nozinja cuts (under various pseudonyms) on Dan Snaith's Jiaolong label.

A year after announcing that Nozinja had signed with the UK's Warp Records, a debut full-length album was announced with the title Nozinja Lodge. The album track list features 'Tsekeleke' which was also released separately on 24 April 2014.

Bacardi house pioneer, DJ Spoko was Nozinja's protégé.

== Discography ==
=== Releases ===
- Nozinja Lodge by Nozinja (2015, Warp Records)
- "Heke Heke / Hoza" by Xitsonga Dance (2013, Jialong)
- "Bafana Bafana / Dyambu" by Tshetsha Boys (2013, Jialong)
- "Shangaan Shake" (2012, Honest Jon's)
- Tshe-Tsha (2008, Nozinja Music)
- "Ndzi Teke Riendzo" by Foster Manganyi (2008, Honest Jon's)
- Shangaan Electro – New Wave Dance Music From South Africa (2010, Honest Jon's)

=== Remixes ===
- Pollyn – "How Small We Are (Nozinja's Shangaan Electro Remix)" from How Small We Are EP (2011)
- Pollyn – "How Small We Are (Nozinja's Shangaan Electro Version)" from Pieces in Patterns EP (2012)
- Nacho Patrol – "Lineas Angola (Nozinja's Shangaan Electro 'Sansana' Remix)" from Lineas Angola (2013)

=== Singles ===
- "Tsekeleke" (2014, Warp Records)

== Nozinja Music ==
Nozinja is also involved with other artists in South Africa, that he A&R's, records, produces and releases across South Africa through 'Nozinja Music'.

- Nkata Mawewe – Khulumani
- Xitsonga Dance – Vomaseve Vol. 6
- Lucy Shivambo – Wamina hi Wihi
- Tshe-Tsha Boys – Xolo / Ka Buti
- Tshe-Tsha Boys – Tshe-Tsha
- Tiyiselani Vomaseve – Vanghana
- Ni Vhona Khombo – Mancingelani Vol. 2
- Vuyelwa – Mosimana Wa Dikgom
- Mapostoli – Mapostoli
- Mario Chauke – Avanga Hembi Vol. 3
- Tshe-Tsha Boys – ni famba na wena
- MC Mabasa Na Shigombe Sisters (No. 17) – Ritaboxeka Thumba
