= Ninie Doniah =

Malagasy singer and composer (1966/1967–2023)

- Birth name: Virginie Bezara
- Born: 1966/1967; Malagasy Republic
- Died: 19 November 2023 (aged 56)
- Genres: Salegy
- Occupation(s): Singer, songwriter
- Instrument: Voice

Ninie Doniah (1966/1967 – 19 November 2023) was a Malagasy singer and composer of salegy music that originates from the northern coastal area of Madagascar, including her birthplace of Nosy Be. She descended from a musical family: her grandmother was a celebrated singer of the traditional jijy vako-drazana antakarana.

Doniah was commonly termed the "Queen of Salegy", in counterpoint to the "King of Salegy," superstar Jaojoby. She is considered one of the best female salegy performers in a genre dominated by men, and is the most well-recognized and successful female ambassador of the genre outside of Madagascar.

Doniah recorded more than six albums since the mid-1990s and continued to tour throughout Madagascar and the Indian Ocean islands.

Doniah died on 19 November 2023, at the age of 56.

== Discography ==
Title	Released	Label	Tracks (Length)
Mitapolaka	2011	Studio ProRossy	12 (43'55")

== See also ==
- Music of Madagascar
