= Nkomo =

Nkomo may refer to:

- John Nkomo (1934–2013), 3rd Second Vice-President of Zimbabwe (2009–2013)
- Joshua Nkomo (1917–1999), 1st Second Vice-President of Zimbabwe (1987–1999)
- Nkwenkwe Nkomo, an anti-apartheid student activist in the 1970s
- William Frederick Nkomo (1915–1972), a South African medical doctor, community leader, political activist and teacher
