= Sefako Makgatho Health Sciences University =

Public university in Pretoria North, Gauteng, South Africa

- Former names: Medical University of South Africa (MEDUNSA) (1976-2005); MEDUNSA Campus of the University of Limpopo (2005-2015)
- Motto: Knowledge for Quality Health Services
- Type: Public University
- Established: 1 January 2015
- Chancellor: Dr Penny Moumakwa
- Vice-Chancellor: Prof. Dini Mawela (Acting)
- Students: approx. 7000
- Location: Ga-Rankuwa (next to Dr George Mukhari Hospital) Tshwane, Gauteng Province, South Africa; 25°37′8″S 28°1′22″E
- Colours: Orange, Blue, White
- Website: http://www.smu.ac.za/

Sefako Makgatho Health Sciences University (SMU; Afrikaans: Sefatho Makgatho Universiteit vir Gesondheidswetenskappe), formerly known as Medical University of South Africa (MEDUNSA), is a public medical university in Ga-Rankuwa, Gauteng Province, South Africa. Its current incarnation was formed on 1 January 2015. It is named after South African ANC leader Sefako Makgatho.

== History ==
The Medical University of South Africa (MEDUNSA) was established in 1976 to provide medical education to black students, who were restricted from attending most medical schools in South Africa by the Apartheid government, with a few exceptions at segregated non-white-only medical schools.

The seat of the university is located at Ga-Rankuwa. The name change from MEDUNSA to Sefako Makgatho Health Sciences University (SMU) was one of the causes of the riots in August 2014. From 2005 to 2015, the university was a campus of the University of Limpopo, but it was separated following a review of the merger. The launch on 14 April 2015 was attended by President Jacob Zuma and Minister of Higher Education Blade Nzimande, with the president delivering the keynote address.

== Ranking and Reputation ==
SMU has shown an upward trend in various national and global university rankings from 2020, consistently improving its position.

=== Times Higher Education (THE) World University Rankings ===
The Times Higher Education (THE) ranking is an annual publication that provides a global ranking of universities based on performance metrics across five areas: teaching, research environment, research quality, industry income, and international outlook.

SMU THE World Impact Ranking
Year	World Impact Ranking	Medical and Health	Good Health and Wellbeing	Quality Education
2026	800-1000	1001+	101-200	101-200
2025	1001-1500	1001+	301-400	301-400

SMU THE World Ranking
Year	World Rank	National Rank	Overall	Teaching	Research Environment	Research Quality	Industry	International Outlook
2026	1201-1500	11th	27.3-32.0	26.0	11.1	42.7	19.2	50.0
2025	1201-1500	11th	25.2–30.6	25.4	10.6	48.1	18.3	47.5

=== URAP - University Ranking by Academic Academic Performance ===
URAP, or the University Ranking by Academic Performance, is a global university ranking system developed by the Informatics Institute of Middle East Technical University that ranks higher education institutions based on the quality and quantity of their scholarly publications and research output. It uses data from sources like Web of Science to assess performance in terms of scientific productivity, research impact, research quality, and international collaboration. The system aims to help universities identify areas for improvement and is updated annually. The key indicators is based on a set of weighting scores assigned through the Delphi system. Each indicator receives a percentage of the total score, with weights assigned as follows: Article (21%), Total Document (10%), Citation (21%), Article Impact Total (AIT) (18%), Citation Impact Total (CIT) (15%), and International Collaboration (15%). Since 2020, SMU has consistently improved, demonstrating significant progress each year.

SMU URAP Global Ranking
Year	World Rank	Article	Citation	Total Document	AIT	CIT	International Collaboration	Total
2025/2026	2035	27.76	48.53	21.39	34.03	30.84	34.58	197.12
2024/2025	2166	26.95	43.68	19.44	31.59	27.41	34.52	183.59
2023/2024	2229	26.98	33.92	17.48	24.91	30.43	24.25	157.97
2022/2023	2306	27.1	35.91	16.2	29.75	16.82	27.51	163.29
2021/2022	2445	13.99	32.03	10.29	29.28	32.41	19.15	137.15
2020/2021	2591	8.25	30.93	6.49	21.48	25.44	16.71	109.19

== Organization ==
Organizational

Council

- Judge NM Mavundla - Former Chairperson
- Ms MM Rambauli - Chairperson
- Prof Peter Mbati - Vice-Chancellor
- Dr J Mabelebele - Registrar
- Linda Rojie - President of Convocation
- Ernest Sambo - Convocation

Convocation

- Linda Rojie - President
- Mogomotsi Poppy Mmamolefe- Vice-President
- Sixishe Camagwini Khanya - Secretary
- Ernest Sambo
- Sepirwa Edward Kgabo
- Dr Mbhodi Langanani

== Degree programmes ==
The following degree programmes are offered:

=== School of Medicine ===
- Bachelor of Medicine and Bachelor of Surgery (MBChB) (incl. ECP)
- Master of Medicine – MMed (in various specialisations)
- Master of Science in Clinical Psychology (MSc Clinical Psychology)
- Doctor of Medicine (MD in General Surgery)
- PhD (in various specialisations)
- Bachelor of Diagnostic Radiography (BRad Diag)
- Diploma in Emergency Medical Care (Paramedic)
- Higher certificate in Emergency Medical Care (ECA)

=== School of Pharmacy ===
- Bachelor of Pharmacy (BPharm)
- Master of Pharmacy (MPharm)
- PhD in Pharmacy (PharmD)
- Postgraduate Diploma (Hospital Pharmacy Management)

=== School of Oral Health ===
- Bachelor of Dental Sciences (BDS)
- Master of Dentistry (MDent) (various specialisations)
- PhD in Dentistry
- Bachelor of Dental Therapy (BDT)
- Bachelor of Oral Hygiene (BOH)

=== School of Health Care Sciences ===
==== Department of Nursing Sciences ====
- Baccalaureus Curationis (BCur) (I et A)
- Bachelor of Nursing Science Honours (in various specialisations)
- Master of Nursing Science (in various specialisations)
- PhD in Nursing Sciences
- Diploma in Occupational Health Nursing
- Advanced Diploma in Occupational Health Nursing

==== Department of Human Nutrition and Dietetics ====
- Bachelor of Science in Dietetics
- Masters of Science in Dietetics
- PhD in Dietetics

==== Department of Occupational Therapy ====
- Bachelor of Occupational Therapy
- Masters of Occupational Therapy
- PhD in Occupational Therapy

==== Department of Physiotherapy ====
- Bachelor of Science in Physiotherapy
- Master of Science in Physiotherapy (in various specialization)
- Master of Science in Physiotherapy (in various specialization)
- PhD in Physiotherapy

=== Department of Speech Language Pathology and Audiology ===
- Bachelor of Speech-Language Pathology and Audiology

=== School of Science and Technology ===
- Bachelor of Science, majoring in:
- Chemistry, Computer Science, Physiology, Psychology, Biology, Biochemistry, Physics, Mathematics and Applied Mathematics, Statistics
- Extended Curriculum Programme (ECP) 4 years
- Bachelor of Science Honours
- Masters of Science
- PhD.
