= Daniel Cornel Marivate =

South African writer, composer, and reverend (1897–1989)

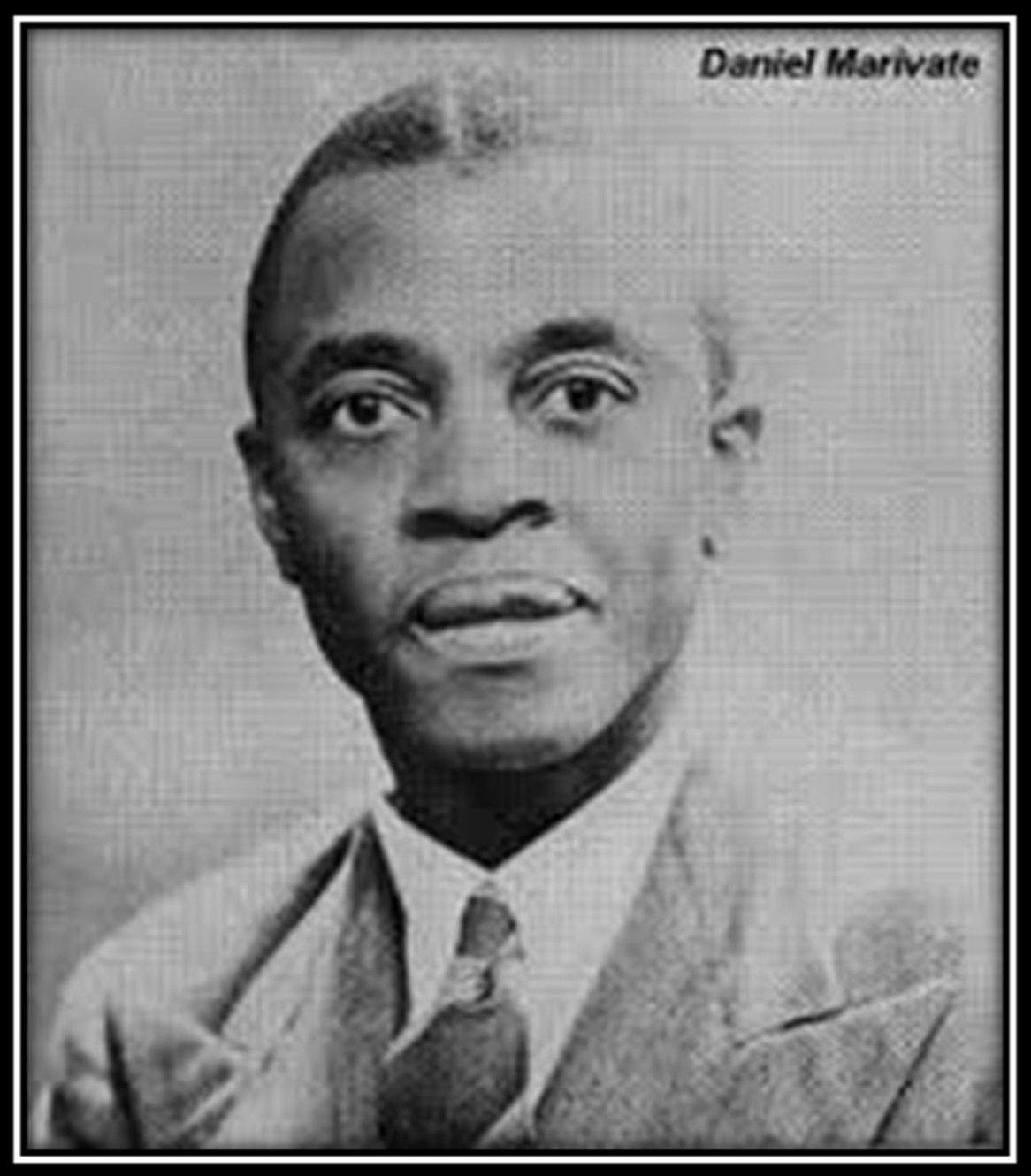
- Marivate in the 1920s
- Born: 18 February 1897; Valdezia, South African Republic
- Died: 30 October 1989 (aged 92); Garankuwa Hospital, South Africa
- Occupations: Writer, composer, educator, reverend, scoutmaster
- Known for: Writing the first Xitsonga novel (Sasavona)
- Notable work: Sasavona, Buku ya Swivuriso
- Spouse: Bertha N'wa-Jonas Manhengeni
- Children: Cornelius Tennyson Daniel Marivate; Russell Marivate; Cecil Roy Marivate; Martin Marivate; Maseve Richard Marivate; Desiree N'wa-Mhamba Marivate; Charles Daniel Marivate

Daniel Cornel Marivate (also known as D.C. Marivate) (18 February 1897 – 30 October 1989) was a South African writer, composer, educator, and reverend. He is widely recognized as a pioneer of Xitsonga literature and authored the first Xitsonga novel, Sasavona, published by the Swiss Mission Press in 1938. Educated at Valdezia and the Lemana Institute, Marivate made immense contributions to the preservation and development of the Xitsonga language through literature, hymn translations, and choral music.

D.C. Marivate Junior Secondary School in Soshanguve and a street in Saulsville, Pretoria, are named in his honor.

== Early life and education ==
Marivate was born in the village of Valdezia in 1897, the eldest child of Cornel Maxangete Maringa and Makhanani Annah Ximambana. He began his primary education in 1904 at the Valdezia primary school, a station established by the Swiss Presbyterian Missionaries in 1875. After completing his primary education in 1908, he studied carpentry, agriculture, English, and mathematics under the tutelage of Reverend Paul Rosset between 1909 and 1912.

He pursued teacher training at the Lemana Training Institute from 1912 to 1915. He began his teaching career at Manabele before being appointed to start a new school in Mambedi. Under his leadership, the school expanded to three teachers, with staff and students collaboratively making bricks to build classrooms. In 1915, Marivate and another black teacher faced a three-month suspension from the village church for attending a traditional village choral dance, an activity the Swiss Missionaries strictly forbade as "heathen."

He furthered his education at Lovedale College in 1924, earning a junior teaching certificate in 1925. He served as the principal of the Valdezia school from 1926 to 1929 before returning to Lovedale to complete his teaching qualifications. Simultaneously, he completed a diploma in music composition (tonic sol-fa) with the London College of Music between 1930 and 1931.

== Career ==
=== Journalism and leadership ===
Original Xitsonga:
"Muyuropa anga hluriwi hi mathlarhi kumbe hiswibhakela kambe hi kutirhisa tidyondzo... Loko ndziri etikweni-nkulu ra Yuropa, ndzivone vayuropa votala lava avari exiyimweni xale hansi eka mina hinhluvuko... Loko hina vantima hilava kufikelela mahanyele yalehenhla yavona, hifanela ku byarha vutihlamuleri byo tihluvukisa, hiti hlengeletela tidyondzo na mahanyele yohluvuka, hibasisa no sasekisa miti yahina leswaku switava nonohwela ku hi tekela ehansi"

English translation:
"A European may not be defeated with weapons or fists but through education... When I was in Europe, I saw many Europeans who were at a lower level of development than me... If we black people want to reach their high standard of living, we must take the responsibility to develop ourselves, prioritise education, good conduct, and home cleanliness, so that it won't be easy to look down upon us."
(Note: English translation is machine-assisted and may contain errors)

— Marivate, 1934

Marivate was an active voice in community development. Alongside E.A. Tlakula and A.E. Mpapele, he served as the editor of The Valdezia Bulletin (later renamed The Light), a local bilingual newspaper published in English and Xitsonga. Initially handwritten and later typed and printed, the publication ran for seven years (1931–1937) and aimed to uplift the local population by broadcasting both regional and national news.

He was highly dedicated to educational administration, serving as the chairman of the Zoutpansberg branch of the African Teachers Association for over a decade, and acting as an inspector and vice-president for the Transvaal African Teachers Association.

=== Scouting ===
In 1934, Marivate was invited to join the African Boy Scouts and traveled to Gilwell Park near London for Scoutmaster training. Due to the outbreak of World War II, the scouts were relocated from London to Bridgwater and Taunton. During this period, he traveled across England, France, and Switzerland. He returned to South Africa in late 1939 via a three-week voyage across the Atlantic, evading wartime submarine threats. In 1940, Scout South Africa formally employed him to train and recruit black youth into the Boy Scouts, a role he fulfilled until his retirement in the winter of 1959.

=== Ministry and Bible translation ===
Although Marivate originally harbored ambitions to study medicine, he stepped aside so his eldest son, Charley, could pursue medical studies at the University of Natal. Subsequently, the Swiss Mission offered Marivate free theological training. After five years of study, he was ordained as a minister in 1956. He led the Swiss Mission Church in Atteridgeville, Pretoria, eventually overseeing 29 congregations.

Recognizing his linguistic expertise, the Bible Society of South Africa invited Marivate to join the Xitsonga Bible translation committee, led by Reverend T.R. Schneider. The committee completed the translation in 1976, and the official Xitsonga Bible was published in 1989 under the title BIBELE Mahungu Lamanene.

== Literary works and composition ==
Original Xitsonga:
"Xitsonga xa ka hina xi nadziha ngopfu, naswona xi na marito lawa yo tala ngopfu ni mavulavulele ya xilo xin'we hi tindlela leto tala ngopfu.

N'wina hinkwenu lava nga ta tsala tibuku endzhaku ka mina ringetani ku kuma mavulavulele ya Xitsonga ku nga ri ku tsala hi miehleketo ya xilungu, swi bihisa ririmi ra hina na ku pingula eka lava va switwaka."

English translation:
"Our Xitsonga is very sweet, and it has an abundance of vocabulary and many ways to express a single concept... To all of you who will write books after me, try to find the true Xitsonga expressions rather than writing with a European mindset; that ruins our language and sounds awkward to those who hear it."
(Note: English translation is machine-assisted and may contain errors)

— Marivate, Valdezia, 5 February 1938

Marivate pioneered Xitsonga choral music. In 1931, Eric Gallo's Singer Gramophone company sent Marivate and his choral group to London to record the first Xitsonga and Tshivenda musical tracks. He composed numerous pieces for choirs and the church.

=== Books and translations ===
- Sasavona (1938, Swiss Mission in South Africa)
- David Livingstone (1941, Swiss Mission in South Africa)
- Buku ya Swivuriso
- Xiloyiloyi (1984, Sasavona Publishers)
- Xitsonga Hymnary, Tinsimu ta Vakriste (1989, 8th revised edition, Sasavona Publishers)
- BIBELE Mahungu Lamanene (1989, The Bible Society of South Africa) – Co-translator

=== Selected musical compositions ===
- Xinkanka (1939)
- Tinsimbi ta Valungu (1951)
- Serululu (1951)
- Ben, Ben, Ben (1954)
- Mbuti ya Shidzwele (1968–1969)
- Xidzedze
- Kaya
- Phelindhaba
- Homu yo basa
- Yingisani
- Vamakweru!
- Xinyenyani

== Personal life ==
Marivate was married to Bertha N'wa-Jonas Manhengeni. They had six sons and one daughter, many of whom became prominent professionals in South Africa:

- Cornelius Tennyson Daniel Marivate – Professor of Languages at UNISA
- Russell Marivate – Medical Doctor
- Cecil Roy Marivate – Educator
- Martin Marivate – Medical Doctor
- Maseve Richard Marivate – Award-winning Mathematics Educator
- Desiree N'wa-Mhamba Marivate – Nurse
- Charles Daniel Marivate – Medical Doctor
