= Munghana Lonene FM =

South African radio station

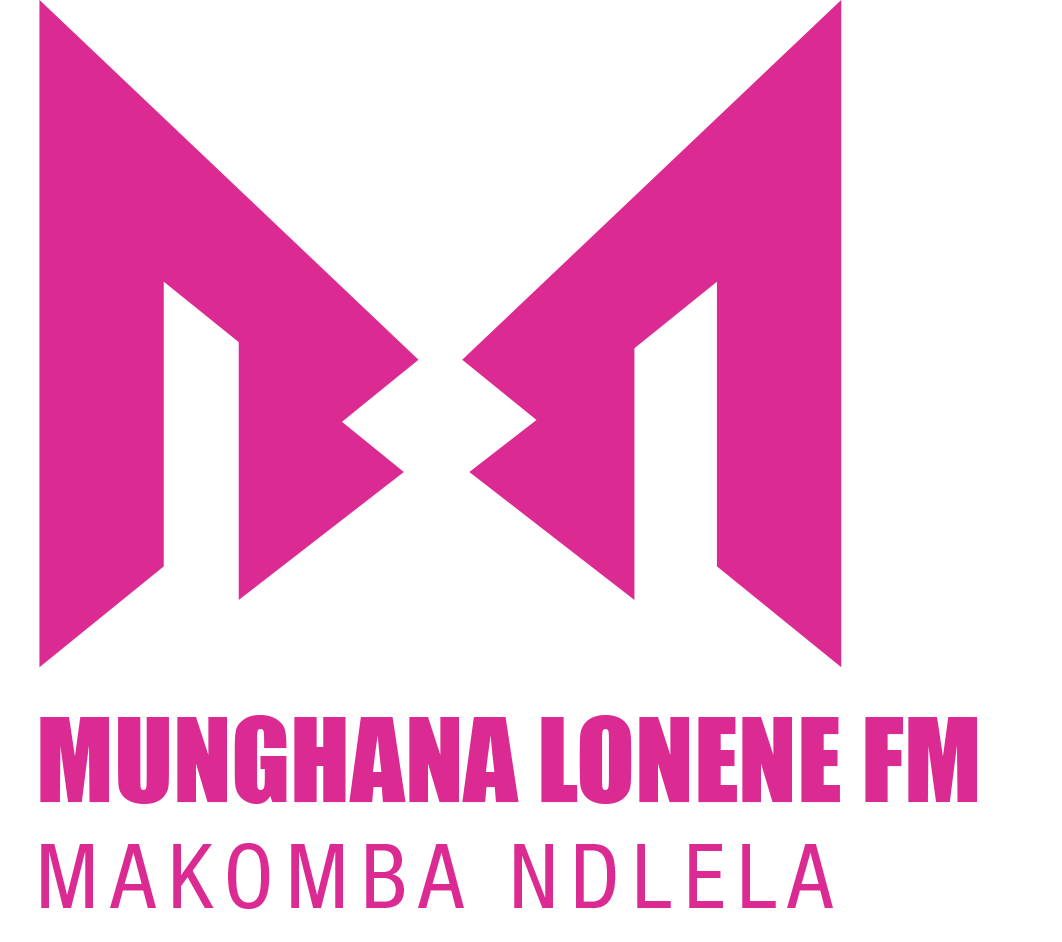
- South Africa
- Broadcast area: Limpopo, Mpumalanga, Gauteng and North West Provinces
- Frequency: Multiple

Ownership
- Owner: SABC

History
- First air date: 1 February 1965

Links
- Website: www.munghanalonenefm.co.za

Munghana Lonene FM is an SABC (South African Broadcasting Cooperation) radio station broadcasting in Tsonga language in South Africa. In Tsonga, "Munghana Lonene" means "a true friend." Munghana Lonene FM is geared to listeners who understand Xitsonga. Munghana Lonene FM is branded as an "infotainment" radio station with a 50% split of music and talk. It offers an environment interactive with its listeners, providing a mixture of news, music, current affairs, talk shows, education, sport, weather and traffic. The music repertoire consists of Jazz, R&B, Kwaito, House, Gospel music and African music.

Munghana Lonene FM's broadcast areas includes Gauteng, Limpopo, eastern Mpumalanga and Mozambique.

== History ==
On 1 February 1965, initial programmes in the Tsonga language were broadcast for listeners in the then Northern Transvaal, from the Johannesburg studios of the South African Broadcasting Corporation, at that time situated in Broadcast House, Commissioner Street. This service later became known as Radio Tsonga. On 1 February 1984 Radio Tsonga was also broadcast on medium wave from Pietersburg (now Polokwane). On 1 May of the same year, coverage was extended to listeners in Soweto via a low power FM transmitter atop the SABC building at Auckland Park.

Amongst those who managed the station is former presenter and Radio 2000 manager, James Shikwamabane after Tsakani Baloyi left the station in 2011. Former sports presenter James Swikwambane has won more National and International Awards; he was the station manager from May 2012 to September 2016.

From 1 December 2016, Lawrence Ubisi was the station manager till March 2021. Vongani Nkanyane is the station's marketing manager. On 1 September 2018 the station announced Tebogo Jacko Magubane as its new Programmes Manager.

Tebogo Jacko Magubane, Rose Tshabalala and Ruth Maphophe are the station's current Top Management, managing the station with Rudzani Mashamba who is the Marketing Manager for the Limpopo Combo consisting of Munghana Lonene FM, Phalaphala FM and Thobela FM.

As of 4 February 2020, OVHD is adding SABC Radio stations on its audio banquet and Munghana Lonene FM is now part of the stations on the banquet on Channel 622.

== Coverage and frequencies ==
Coverage Areas & Frequencies
Area	Freq. MHz
Nelspruit	89.4
Louis Trichardt	91.9
Gaba	91.3
Hoedspruit	92.0
Tzaneen	92.6
Pretoria	95.6
Mokopane	99.6
Johannesburg	103.2

== Programming ==
=== Monday – Friday ===
- 00:00–03:00: Gongomela with Risimati Kwinika aka N'wana N'wa Gee
- 03:00-05:00: Dzudza Vurhongo with The Quitinizer aka xikwembu xa radio
- 05:00–06:00: Current Affairs (Tiko A Xietleli)
- 06:00–09:00: Phaphama with DJ Brian Rikhotso and Conny Mikateko Mashimbye aka Connizer
- 09:00–12:00: Swa Risima with Khensani N'wa Nyango
- 12:00–14:00: Afrika wa Vulavula with Khalanga Pat Mathebula
- 14:00–15:00: Dzumba na Mina with Ike Ngobeni
- 15:00–18:00: Khoma Ndlela with Dj Mat & Lindhiva
- 18:00–19:00: Current Affairs (Tiko A Xietleli)
- 19:00–20:00: Ta Mintlangu (Sports) with Nyiko Sithole
- 20:00–21:00: Ta Vaaki with Chiechie N'wa Rivisi
- 21:00–22:00: Educational Programmes with Chiechie N'wa Rivisi (Fridays Rooitjie Rikhotso)

=== Saturday ===
- 01:00–05:00: Embiteni ya Vunanga Non-Stop Mixtapes
- 05:00–06:00: Mina Hi Mina Omnibus
- 06:00–07:00: Current Affairs (Tiko A Xietleli)
- 07:00–09:00: Saturday Breakfast with Maningi wa Ntamu
- 09:00–12:00: Top 30 (Switshongo) with Mathilda Chauke
- 12:00–13:00: State your mind & Teen Zone with Mpfuxelelo Makaringe
- 12:00–15:00: Nkatsakanyo with Mchangani
- 15:00–18:00: Etimbaleni (Sports Live) with Rhandzu Optimus
- 18:00–19:00: Xitsonga Top 10 with The Quintoniser
- 19:00–21:00: Mantshwani with DJ Soulcrusher
- 21:00–01:00: Hi Pfurha Malangavi with Given Mabunda

=== Sunday ===
- 00:00–05:00: Non-Stop Mixtapes
- 05:00–06:00: Mpfumawulo wa swilombe with Ruth Maphophe
- 06:00–09:00: Sisimuka u vangama with Maningi wa ntamu
- 09:00–12:00: Lathela with Mathilda Chauke
- 12:00–15:00: Pyupya with Themba 'Techtonics' Chauke
- 15:00–18:00: Etimbaleni (Sports Live) with Rhandzu Optimus
- 18:00–19:00: Current Affairs (Tiko A Xietleli)
- 19:00–22:00: Empfuxelelweni with Thembzana Reloaded
- 22:00–00:00: Vunanga na Vutomi with Given Mabunda

== Broadcast time ==
- 24/7

== Social media ==
- Twitter : @Munghana
- Facebook : Munghana Lonene fm: Makomba-Ndlela
- Instagram : munghanalonene
- YouTube : Munghana Lonene FM

== Listenership Figures ==
Estimated Listenership
	7 Day	Ave. Mon-Fri
May 2013	1 198 000	755 000
Feb 2013	1 039 000	670 000
Dec 2012	1 092 000	704 000
Oct 2012	1 096 000	696 000
Aug 2012	1 214 000	657 000
Jun 2012	1 175 000	635 000
