= Ga-Rankuwa =

District in South Africa

- Location within Gauteng Location within South Africa
- Coordinates: 25°37′12″S 27°58′48″E
- Country: South Africa
- Province: Gauteng
- Municipality: City of Tshwane

Area
  - Total: 52.18 km^{2} (20.15 sq mi)

Population (2011)
  - Total: 90,945
  - Density: 1,743/km^{2} (4,514/sq mi)

Racial makeup (2011)
  - Black African: 99.2%
  - Coloured: 0.3%
  - Indian/Asian: 0.1%
  - White: 0.1%
  - Other: 0.3%

First languages (2011)
  - Tswana: 69.2%
  - Northern Sotho: 8.2%
  - Tsonga: 4.2%
  - Zulu: 3.8%
  - Other: 14.6%
- Time zone: UTC+2 (SAST)
- Postal code (street): 0221
- PO box: 0208
- Area code: 012

Ga-Rankuwa is a large settlement located about 37 km north-west of Pretoria. Provincially it is in Gauteng province, but it used to fall in Bophuthatswana during the apartheid years, and under the North West province until the early 2000s.

== History ==
The area around Ga-Rankuwa had been settled by Tswana people since at least the 17th century. Some of these communities were absorbed into the mthwakazi kingdom by the invading Ndebele (or Matabele) under Mzilikazi in the early 19th century. When the Boers defeated and drove away the Matebele and claimed ownership of the land of that kingdom, they divided the area into farms and distributed the land among themselves, including the land of many Bakwena-Tswana villages that still existed there. In 1860 thirty families who were an extension of the Bakwena people of Betanie got together and through a combination of selling some of their cattle and from savings from wages accrues from labouring put together one hundred and fifty Pounds towards three hundred Pounds that was used to purchase the Farm Hebron from the Traansvaal Republic Government. This farm at the time extended to an area that consist half of the present Ga-Rankuwa. The balance one Hundred and Fifty Pounds was forwarded by the Berlin Mission Lutheran Church. The other half of Ga Rankuwa consist of land that was similarly purchased by The Bakgatla Ba Mmakau. The Bakwena people through the Bakwena chief, Mamogale, and several German Lutheran missionaries and other missionaries such as those of the Methodist church, began collecting cattle and money from Tswana in the area who were indentured to Boers to buy back land that had been taken away from them. Despite many obstacles, Chief Mamogale and the missionaries bought back several farms, and Ga-Rankuwa was one of these farms, and with these lands, Chief Mamogale was able to establish a chiefdom that came to be called the Bakwena Ba Magopa. Oral testimony and written records suggest that the local Veldkornet, Paul Kruger, who would become president of the Transvaal Republic or South African Republic, helped chief Mamogale and the missionaries acquire these lands. They also purchased land near Brits, where Chief Mamogale established his "capital" in the village of Bethanie. Chief Mamogale's descendants continued to be recognized as the chiefs of the Bakwena Ba Magopa and having jurisdiction over Ga-Rankuwa. Chief Mamogale's lands were included in the "Scheduled Native Areas", or "Reserves" under the 1913 Natives Land Act that divided South Africa into white areas and "Native" areas. For several decades of the late 19th and early 20th centuries, these villages engaged in farming and raising livestock, and compared to Africans on white farms they were relatively affluent. In the 1960s, under apartheid, the "Reserves" or "Native Areas" came to be called "homelands," and Ga-Rankuwa was included into the homeland of Bophuthatswana.

The area was proclaimed a Suburb by Proclamation 448 of 1965 and was initially established to accommodate people who were displaced mainly from Lady Selborne. In other words, although Ga-Rankuwa had been purchased and the community established by the Bakwena Ba Magopa, because it was part of a "Reserve," the apartheid government proposed to use it to accommodate Black people removed from other areas. Ga-Rankuwa was developed in accordance with the Physical Planning Act of 1967 which hoped to divert industrial development away from the city centres to the border areas of the homelands. This would not only serve the purpose of attracting workers directly from the homelands and providing cheap labour to the factories but would also divert the labour flow away from the city, thereby reducing labour migrancy. Situated 34 km north-west of Pretoria, Ga-rankuwa formed part of the Tswana homeland, Bophuthatswana. The area provided housing for the Black labourers and their families and was meant to service the industrial area of Rosslyn, 10 km away. Apart from the state-built houses, Black people were permitted to buy plots and build their own houses. It was estimated that the suburb would eventually accommodate a population of 120,000 people.

=== Origins of the name ===
The early residents of Ga-Rankuwa were forcibly removed from fertile land in neighboring Lady Selborne, Bantule, Marabastad, Rama, Newclare, Eastwood and Sophiatown to mention but a few. The area was named after a Bakgatla headman, Rankuwa Boikhutso. Rankuwa means "we are taken". When they arrived in the area, which was infertile and unsuited for farming, they named it Ga-Rankuwa which means "We are not taken".

Another explanation for the name of the town is that it was named after a prominent follower of Chief Mamogale, when these lands were being purchased from the Boers. The man's name was RraNkuwa (Father Nkuwa or Mr. Nkuwa), and his lands were often referred to as Ga-Rankuwa, or "at Mr. Nkuwa's."

Another meaning of the name came from the fact that the previous owner of the land had many sheep, and was known as the father of sheep (Rra-nku) 'Ga-Ranku' refers to the place of the father of sheep. 'We are taken' is not a likely meaning of the word since it derives from a Sotho word, while most Ga-rankuwa residents are Tswana. Garankuwa was also very active during the 1976 student uprising which resulted in many government buildings being burnt and many students fleeing into exile in neighboring countries. The suburb also played a large role in overthrowing the formally Bophuthatswana homeland in 1993–94 resulting in scores of people being brutally killed by Bophuthatswana armed forces.

== Geography ==
It is divided into 18 sections called Units, which are Unit 1,2,3,4,5,6,7,8,9,10,15,16,17,20,21,23,24 and 25.

=== Climate ===
Due to the fact that Ga-Rankuwa finds itself sandwiched between two areas of Pretoria (Pretoria North and Pretoria West) and also neighboring province North West, the climate is a mix of extremely hot and extreme rains in summer. Followed by warm winters and autumns.

== Demographics ==
Ga-Rankuwa is a diverse Suburb whose residents speak many languages. Languages spoken in Ga-Rankuwa are:

- Setswana
- English
- Zulu
- Xhosa
- Ndebele
- Xitsonga
- Tshivenda

A mixture of languages such as Afrikaans, Sesotho, English and isiZulu were fused together to form what is now a unique language-style of the independent suburb with a slight inclination to a slang known as Pretoria Sotho. That produces a unique language, also spoken in its neighbouring suburbs, Mabopane, Soshanguve, Mamelodi, Atteridgeville, Temba & Hammanskraal.

Residents from this area provide the bulk of labour for the Rosslyn industrial area, a hub of motor vehicle manufacturing, and also for the industrial park in Zone 15. Many of the residents of Ga-Rankuwa are middle class citizens working for the private sector. The dominant religion in Ga-Rankuwa is Christianity followed by other dominant African traditional religions and Islam.

== Local government ==
Ga-Rankuwa falls under the City of Tshwane Metropolitan Municipality (main area Pretoria and surrounds), which is in the Gauteng province. Its municipal offices are based in Unit 5.

== Education ==
Two major University Campuses are located in Ga-Rankuwa. A Sefako Makgatho Health Sciences University campus is located in Ga-Rankuwa Zone 6 and it was formerly known as the Medical University of South Africa. The Tshwane University of Technology has a campus located in Ga-Rankuwa Zone 2. The campus was formerly known as Setlogelo Technikon and was renamed after merging with the former Pretoria Technikon and Technikon Northern Gauteng (TNG).

== Health care ==
Ga-Rankuwa contains Dr. George Mukhari Academic Hospital, a public hospital. The hospital serves as a teaching hospital as it shares its facilities with the Sefako Makgatho Health Sciences University, which was the first black medical school.

There are local government run clinics in Zones 1, 4, 6, RDP and Mmakau. Several privately owned health facilities are located in most of the zones, the biggest of which is Wisani Medical Centre located in Zone 1 which was established in 1995 by the Marivate family after more than 30 years of service by the late Dr Charles Daniel Marivate. Dr Charles Daniel Marivate was the first private health provider of Ga-Rankuwa and the surrounding communities since November 1963.

== Transport ==
=== Railway ===
PRASA operates the Metrorail train commuter service, that connects Ga-Rankuwa to the Pretoria railway station and on to Germiston and Johannesburg Park Station, as well as to the East Rand, Soweto and Vereeniging.

== Sport ==
Ga-Rankuwa is home to Ga-Rankuwa United Football club which was once part of the Vodacom League. Their home stadium, Odi Stadium is situated in the neighboring suburb of Mabopane.

== Places of interest ==
There are a number of places of interest in and around the suburb. Some of the notable ones are:

- SixViews Mountain Activities

=== Community outreach ===
- Ga-Rankuwa Workshop for the blind known as Itireleng.
- YMCA Ga-Rankuwa

== Notable residents ==
- Ben Dikobe
- SJJ Lesolang
- Dr Charles Daniel Marivate
- Tim Modise
- Gomolemo Mokae
- Precious Moloi-Motsepe
- Focalistic
- Sam Motsuenyane
- Mamokgethi Phakeng
- Patrice Motsepe
