= Thomas Chauke =

South African Xitsonga musician

Dr. Thomas Chauke
- Also known as: Shinyori
- Born: Thomas Hasani Chauke; 4 February 1952 (age 74); Saselemani, Limpopo, South Africa
- Genres: Xitsonga
- Occupations: Musician; singer composer; Record Producer
- Years active: 1979–present

Dr Thomas Hasani "Shinyori" Chauke OIS (born 5 February 1952) is a South African Xitsonga musician. Chauke was granted an honorary doctorate in African languages for the role his music has played in the development of the Xitsonga language.

== Early life ==
Chauke was born in Salema (Saselamani) Village in Limpopo Province, South Africa. He dropped out of school at primary level (Standard 3/Grade 5). Chauke has five wives and 23 children.

== Music career ==
Chauke started his band with 13 singers from a shebeen in the late 1970s. After a few months, only five remained. They performed at school halls to raise money to go to Johannesburg and realize the recording dream. Chauke signed a contract to record with GRC. Under GRC, the music was branded Nyoresh. He moved to Wea Records, where he got a better deal and changed his music brand from Nyoresh to Shimatsatsa ("a beautiful girl"). In 1981, he recorded his first album called Shimatsatsa no. 1 under the burner name Thomas Chauke and Shinyori Sisters. Now he hands out awards yearly in the category: Dr. Thomas Chauke's Artist of the Year for Munghana Lonene Fm. In the course of his career, Chauke has received one diamond disc, one double gold disc, six platinum discs, 11 double platinum and nine triple platinum discs.

== Awards and accomplishments ==
- Honorary Doctor of Philosophy degree, African languages University of Venda
- South African Music Awards (SAMA) won 16 awards
- Munghana-Lonene FM Awards won more than 10 awards
- Munghana-Lonene FM Awards Special Award
- MTN SAMA 19 Lifetime Achievement Award 2013
- In 2014, Munghana Lonene FM introduced new award category, Dr Thomas Chauke Album of the year

== Discography ==
With a career spanning over 34 years, he has released over 36 studio albums.

- Nyoresh
- Shimatsatsa No. 1 - Shimatsatsa shamina
- Shimatsatsa No. 2 – Don't Be Surprised
- Shimatsatsa No. 3 – Bomber Mhlengwe
- Shimatsatsa No. 4 - Shimatsatsa xa mina
- Shimatsatsa No. 5 – Shikwamula Mazingi
- Shimatsatsa No. 6 – Xibamuxa Movha
- Shimatsatsa No. 7 – Suka Lovha
- Shimatsatsa No. 8 – Ma jamble Sale
- Shimatsatsa No. 9 – Humelela M.K
- Shimatsatsa No. 10 – Jim Na Jack
- Shimatsatsa No. 11 – Hi Hanya kuvava
- Shimatsatsa No. 12 – Buku Yi Hibyerile
- Shimatsatsa No. 13 – Xifumi Na Lazaro
- Shimatsatsa No. 14 – Suka Davulos
- Shimatsatsa No. 15 – Kokwani Wa Wun'Wana
- Shimatsatsa No. 16 – Sodoma Na Gomora
- Shimatsatsa No. 17 – Bangi situlu
- Shimatsatsa No. 18 – Mati-Endla (SAMA 1999 Winner)
- Shimatsatsa No. 19 - I Mutshiveri Muni? (SAMA 2000 Winner)
- Shimatsatsa No.20 – Magidi – Mbirhi (SAMA 2001 Winner)
- Shimatshana No. 21 – Mpfende Mpfende (SAMA 2002 Winner)
- Shimatsatsa No. 22 – Mugawula
- Shimatsatsa No. 23 – Shimovhana
- Shimatsatsa No. 24 – Madzolonga
- Shimatsatsa No. 25 – Xidudla Kedibone
- The Best Of Thomas Chauke – Volume 1
- The Best Of Thomas Chauke Na Shinyori Sisters – Volume 2
- Shimatsatsa No. 26 – Mavholovholo
- Shimatsatsa No. 27 – Rejina
- Shimatsatsa No. 28 – Swelemetee
- Shimatsatas No. 29 – Xihloka Xa Maseve (SAMA 2010–Nominated)
- Shimatsatsa No. 30 - Jehovha (SAMA 2011 Winner)
- Shimatsatsa No. 31 – Dokodela (SAMA 2013 Winner)
- Shimatsatsa No. 32 - Virus-Computer ya nhloko (SAMA 2014 Winner) "Sold a remarkable Gold within 2 Days of release"
- Shimatsatsa No. 33 - Basopa
- Shimatsatsa No. 34 - Xiganga (SAMA 2017 Winner)
- Shimatsatsa No. 35 - Majagani
- Shimatsatsa No. 36 - Xikungu
