= Anziza Salema =

Malagasy singer of Salegy

- Born: Mahajanga
- Occupation: Singer

Anziza Salema is a Salegy Baôsa singer whose personal and musical roots lie in the Sakalava Boina culture of Madagascar.

== Discography ==
- Mahaiza Mipetraka (1999)
- Ameolalana (2004)

=== Compilations ===
- Talents de Madagascar Vol. 1 (2006)
