= Salema Bazar =

Village in India

Coordinates: 24.012°N 91.836°E

Salema Bazar is a village near Ambassa in Dhalai district of Tripura state of India.
