= Tebogo Jacko Magubane =

South African music producer (born 1982)

Magubane Da FranchiZ
- Also known as: Radio Killa, FranchiZ
- Born: Tebogo Jacko Magubane; 21 February 1982 (age 44); Winterveld, South Africa
- Origin: Pretoria
- Genres: House
- Occupations: Radio Personality, DJ
- Years active: 2001–present

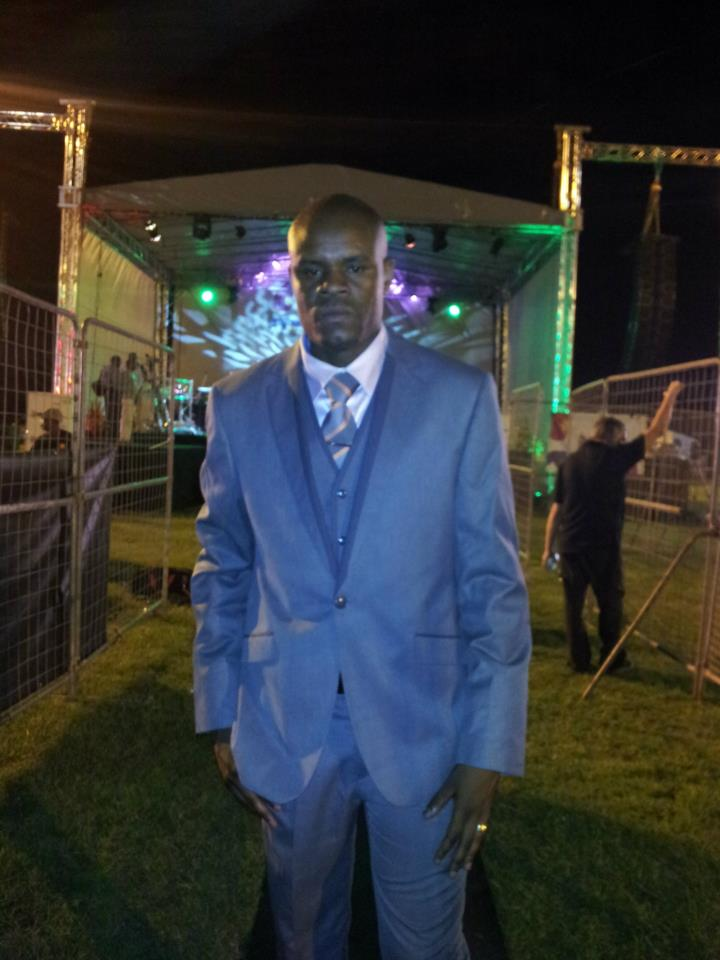
Tebogo Jacko Magubane at the 2011 Mughana Lonene FM Music Awards

Tebogo Jacko Magubane (born 21 February 1982) also known by his stage name Magubane da Franchiz (stylized as FranchiZ) is a South African house DJ and Music Producer radio producer currently working for Tshwane FM 93.6 as the Station Manager.

== Early life ==
Magubane was born in Winterveldt, Tshwane and his family later moved to Kromkuil, also in Pretoria. There Magubane's dreams of becoming an entertainer and radio presenter began to be realised. As a student at the Tshwane University of Technology (TUT), he joined the campus based radio station TUT Top Stereo 93.6 (Now Tshwane FM)as presenter for the breakfast show "The First Beat" in 2006 a slot he hosted until February 2008 before moving to the afternoon drive show "The Off Ramp" in. Magubane was concurrently working for the TUT as a student publication editor, a post he held from 2004 until his permanent departure from the university in March 2008 when he joined Munghana Lonene FM as a presenter.

== Education ==
Tebogo Magubane began his formal education in 1988 at Khensani Primary School in Soshanguve, completing Standard 4 in 1993. He then attended D.C. Marivate Middle School, where he completed Standard 7 in 1996, and matriculated from Hlanganani High School in 1999.

In 2001, he furthered his studies in Accounting at Technikon Pretoria, now known as the Tshwane University of Technology (TUT). While studying at TUT, he was actively involved in student life and extracurricular development. He represented the university at national debating competitions and served in various student structures promoting academic and personal development.

Magubane later expanded his academic portfolio by earning a National Certificate in Radio from Wits Radio Academy, equipping him with specialized skills in broadcasting and radio programming. He also holds a BA degree with a specialization in Communication Science from the University of South Africa Unisa, enhancing his expertise in media, communication, and public engagement.

In October 2018, Magubane graduated with a Bachelor of Laws (LLB) degree from Unisa. His academic background spans media, communication, business, and law.

== Radio career ==
As a child, few would have predicted that Tebogo Magubane would pursue a career in radio. Known for being shy and reserved, he was often bullied during his school years. Despite this, he consistently excelled academically and was known for his determination and competitive spirit.

Magubane's radio journey began in October 2006 when he joined TUT Top Stereo (now Tshwane FM), the campus-based community radio station of the Tshwane University of Technology. He quickly made his mark as the host of the station's breakfast show, The First Beat.

In 2008, he joined the South African Broadcasting Corporation (SABC) as a presenter. By October of that same year, he was appointed as a producer. Over the next several years, he rose through the ranks, and in 2014 he was appointed as a Specialist Producer for Sound and Imaging. During this period, he also continued to serve as a producer and traffic presenter on Phaphama, the flagship breakfast show of Munghana Lonene FM.

On 1 September 2018, Magubane was officially announced as the Programmes Manager for Munghana Lonene FM. He held this position until 30 June 2023.

In July 2023, he returned to Tshwane FM—where his radio career had begun—this time as Station Manager, leading the station into a new era of digital transformation and audience engagement.

=== Joining Munghana Lonene FM ===
After joining Munghana Lonene FM in March 2008, Tebogo Magubane made his first on-air appearance on 24 March. He initially hosted the International Top 30 on Saturdays from 20:00 to 22:00, followed by Ta Mbilu Yanga from 22:00 to 02:00 on Sundays. He later applied for a position as a producer to broaden his involvement in radio production.

As a producer, he worked on several of the station’s shows, including Phaphama (the breakfast show), Mahlamba-Ndlopfu, Top 30, and Khuluka na Mina. Magubane is proficient in 10 of South Africa’s 11 official languages.

In 2009, he joined DJ Brian and Sydney Baloyi as the producer of Phaphama. Following changes in the station’s programming, DJ Brian was reassigned to the Afternoon Drive and partnered with Thembzana Reloaded, while Magubane continued as producer of Phaphama, now with Sydney Baloyi and Conny Mashimbye.

In 2015, the station implemented a new daytime lineup, which saw DJ Brian and Sydney Baloyi return to the breakfast show alongside Rhandzu Optimus. Magubane continued to serve as the show’s content and technical producer, and also took on the role of traffic presenter.

He remained in various production and on-air roles until his appointment as Programmes Manager of Munghana Lonene FM on 1 September 2018.

=== Returning to Tshwane FM ===
In July 2023, Tebogo Magubane was appointed Station Manager of Tshwane FM, the campus-based community radio station of the Tshwane University of Technology. This marked a return to the station where his broadcasting career began in 2006. As Station Manager, his role includes overseeing programming, strategic planning, compliance, and the station’s digital transformation initiatives. His appointment forms part of efforts to strengthen Tshwane FM’s operational structure and to align the station with emerging trends in campus and community broadcasting.

== Disc jockey career ==
In 2009, Magubane started venturing into deejaying. He occasionally acted as a host for major festivals and concerts. Magubane is known for his blend of commercial house mixing and passion for drums. he features on various Munghana Lonene FM slots doing live mixes. Magubane has shared the stage with Big names such as Ralf Gum, Oskido, Ganyani and DJ Sbu.

On 1 November 2016 Magubane released a soulful house song titled "Usandidaro" featuring Zimbabwean born UK based vocalist Oluhle. As a follow up a year later Magubane released a parody house song "Anikarhali".

== Significance ==
Magubane is particularly significant for breaking cultural stigmas hampered by South African Public Broadcast Radio of previous generations. By becoming the first presenter turned produced at a full-spectrum Xitsonga radio station being originally zulu and only have learned the language at school

== Awards ==
=== Munghana Lonene FM Staff Excellence Awards ===
The Munghana Lonene FM Staff Excellence Awards were created to honour staff at Munghana Lonene FM for exceptional work in the station.

Year	Nominated work	Category	Result
2013	Himself	Producer of the Year	Won
2013	Phaphama Breakfast Show	Overall show of the Year	Won
2013	Phaphama Breakfast Show	Most Innovative Show of the year	Nominated
2013	Khindlimuka	Most Innovative Show of the year	Nominated

Year	Nominated work	Category	Result
2008	Himself	Best Newcomer	Nominated
