= Gonçalo Mabunda =

Mozambican artist and anti-war activist (born 1975)

- Born: 1 January 1975 (age 51); Maputo, Mozambique
- Notable work: Arms into Art, Throne of an African King

Gonçalo Mabunda (born 1 January 1975 in Maputo, Mozambique) is a Mozambican artist and anti-war activist. Mabunda has exhibited important museums such as the Center Pompidou in Paris, the Venice Biennale, the Museum of Art and Design in New York, Gangwon International Biennale in South Korea, the Museum Kunst Palast in Düsseldorf, the Hayward Gallery in London, the Mori Art Museum in Tokyo, the Johannesburg Art Gallery, the Tropen Museum in Amsterdam, Norway Army Museum, Netherlands Army Museum, Sweden Army Museum, and many more.

Mabunda started his work in the context of a project implemented in 1995, by the Christian Council of Mozambique (CCM) that has been scouring the country and collecting weapons from individuals and communities after a civil war that lasted almost twenty years. In this project some weapons are destroyed while others are deactivated and given to men and women like Mabunda, to sculpt into art. Some 800,000 weapons have been collected since the CCM launched this project, called Transforming Guns into Hopes.

The name is inspired by a Bible verse from the book of Micah: 'They will hammer their swords into ploughshares and their spears into pruning hooks'.

Mabunda is a partner artist of the African Artists for Development, an organisation that backs community development projects associated with works by contemporary artists.

== Art ==
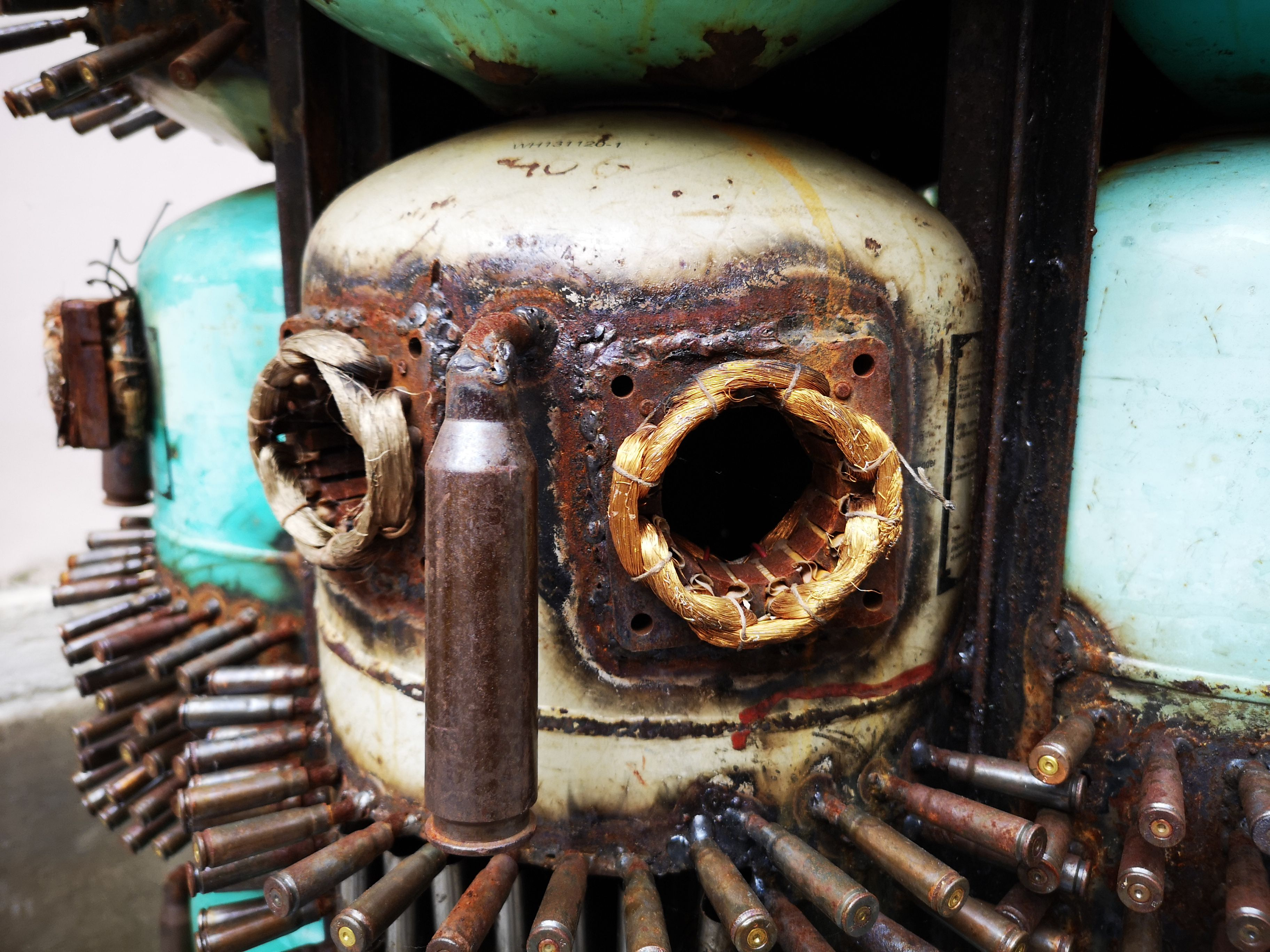
Part of an art installation by Gonçalo Mabunda at the Biennale in Venice, Italy.

Mabunda uses Kalashnikovs, rockets, pistols, and shell casing in order to make anthropomorphic figures out of the deconstructed weapons. By turning weapons into lifelike figures, Mabunda literally turns death into life. The figurines are also representative of the over 1 million people killed during his country's civil war. Mabunda has also lost relatives during the war, which makes working with and deconstructing weapons used during the 16-year war more important for him. He makes thrones and masks out of these deactivated weapons used during the Mozambique Civil War. The masks are based on traditional Sub-Saharan African masks, however, the original twist on the art form by creating them out of weapons is unique to Mabunda. Representing power, Mabunda's thrones mock how the traditional power rests on weapons. By using weapons, Mabunda's work carries the message of how further violence can be prevented, and that destroying the weapons of war can be done in an aesthetic and artistic way. Mabunda's art directly challenges the absurdity of war. His work has a modernist style to it and has been compared to the work of Braque and Picasso.

== Reception ==
Gonçalo Mabunda's artwork has been followed by the international press, French Newspaper Le Monde, huffingtonPost from the UK are among medias that followed Mabunda's work effect on his local community.

In 2014, Mabunda was one of 20 African artists to figure in French art collector André Magning publication African Stories. In 2015, Mabunda's works were the main subject of CNN show Inside Africa, a TV series highlighting different economic, social and cultural personalities in Africa.

Former US president Bill Clinton, a fan of Mabunda's work, commissioned the artist to create trophies for his philanthropic organisation the Clinton Global Initiative.

In July 2017, his pieces were shown in the European Parliament in an exhibition organized by the European Centre for Electoral Support at the occasion of the launch of a handbook produced in the context of a project funded by the European Union on "Preventing Electoral Conflicts and Violence in the countries of the Southern African Development Communities" that includes Mozambique. The launching seminar in the European Parliament was chaired by the Member of the European Parliament, Judith Sargentini, former Chief Observer to the EU election observation mission in Mozambique and Tanzania and co-chaired by Alojz Peterle, Member of the European Parliament, former Chief Observer to the EU election observation mission in Kenya.
