= Salema, India =

Salema
- Village
- Location in Punjab, India Salema (India)
- Coordinates: 31°04′20″N 75°24′14″E
- Country: India
- State: Punjab
- District: Jalandhar

Languages
  - Official: Punjabi
- Time zone: UTC+5:30 (IST)

Salema (pronounced "Saleman") is a village in Shahkot, a city in Jalandhar District of Indian state of Punjab.

== Geography ==
Salema lies near the Shahkot-Nakodar-Pandori road, which is almost 1 km from it.

The nearest railway station to Salema is Malsian railway station at a distance of 9 km.
