= Evangelical Presbyterian Church in South Africa =

Protestant denomination

- Classification: Protestant
- Theology: Calvinism
- Distinct fellowships: Seven (as of 2004)
- Associations: World Communion of Reformed Churches
- Headquarters: South Africa
- Congregations: 37 (as of 2004)
- Members: 30,000 (as of 2004)
- Official website: epcsa.org.za

The Evangelical Presbyterian Church in South Africa is a Protestant denomination in the Reformed tradition.

== Description ==
It had a relationship with the Reformed Churches in Switzerland. The organisation's structure is threefold: the parish, the presbytery and the synod. The church has seven presbyteries.

It is a member of the World Communion of Reformed Churches. Sister denominations are the Presbyterian Church in Mozambique and the Lesotho Evangelical Church.

The organisation subscribes to the Apostles Creed and Nicene Creed.

In 2004, it had 30,000 members, 37 congregations and 7 house fellowships. The organisation's official language is Tsonga.

== See also ==
- Christianity in Africa
- List of Reformed denominations
- Religion in South Africa
