= Charles Daniel Marivate =

South African physician (1924–2019)

- Born: 11 July 1924; Valdezia, Limpopo, South Africa
- Died: 2 December 2019 (aged 95); Valdezia, Limpopo, South Africa
- Occupation: Medical Doctor
- Spouse: Winnie Muofhe Marivate (nee Machao)

Charles Daniel Marivate (11 July 1924 – 2 December 2019) was a black South African physician who was active in the Ga-Rankuwa and Valdezia areas. He is known as the first medical practitioner in Ga-Rankuwa, serving surrounding areas, at a time when there were no medical services by the then Apartheid government, and few black physicians. He was a member of the first class (pioneer class) of black medical students at the Durban medical school, University of Natal. For his service to the medical profession, he received an honorary doctorate from the Medical University of South Africa, where he had been a part-time lecturer and chair of council as well.

== Early life ==
He was the first-born child of Reverend Dr Daniel Cornel Marivate and Bertha Marivate (nee Manhengeni). Two of his brothers, Martin and Russell, also became physicians.

He attended high school at St. Peters College in Rosettenville. His Mathematics teacher at the school was the late Oliver Tambo.

== Personal life ==
He was married to Winnie Muofhe Marivate (nee Machao) and together they had 5 children, two of whom also became physicians.

== Higher education ==
He obtained his Teachers Certificate form Lemana College in 1946.

He obtained a BA degree from the University of Fort Hare in the Eastern Cape in 1950.

He was part of the first class of black medical students at Durban Medical School (Pioneer Class) at the then University of Natal, enrolling in 1952 and graduating with a medical degree in 1958.

He obtained the M Prax Med post Graduate degree of Family Medicine, in 1986, at the Medical University of South Africa whilst working as a part-time lecturer there.

He received an honorary doctorate from the Medical University of South Africa in 1993.

== Career ==
He was a teacher at Lemana College.

From 1960 to 1964 he was an assistant medical officer at Shiluvane Hospital near Tzaneen.

He then moved Ga-Rankuwa, working as a medical practitioner from 1964 to 1989. He was the first medical practitioner in Ga-Rankuwa and the surrounding areas, he set up the first medical service in the township and surrounding areas. During this time in Ga-Rankuwa, Dr CD Marivate established a group practice with the late Dr Russell Marivate, DR BZ Nkomo, DR KP Malelane and the late DR George Mukhari amongst others. They provided health services in Winterveld, Mabopane, Soshanguve and Motla near Hammanskraal.

In 1989, Marivate relocated back to his home and place of birth, Valdezia village, near Makhado in Limpopo. He continued to work as a medical practitioner in his home village Valdezia from 1990 until 2013 when he permanently retired from medicine.

== Positions held ==
- Member of the pilot committee for the establishment of the Medical University of South Africa (MEDUNSA).
- Part-time medical officer for the Bophuthatswana Government clinics in Ga-Rankuwa and Mabopane.
- Part-time casualty officer of Ga-Rankuwa hospital.
- President of the SA Medical Discussion Group.
- Member of the Medical University of South Africa council.
- Chairman of Valdezia/Mambedi Community Authority.
