= Tiyani =

- Location within Limpopo Location within South Africa
- Coordinates: 23.300°S 30.309°E
- Country: South Africa
- Province: Limpopo
- District: Vhembe
- Municipality: Makhado

Area
  - Total: 9.36 km^{2} (3.61 sq mi)

Population (2011)
  - Total: 9,715
  - Density: 1,040/km^{2} (2,690/sq mi)

Racial makeup (2011)
  - Black African: 99.7%
  - Coloured: 0.1%
  - Indian/Asian: 0.1%
  - Other: 0.1%

First languages (2011)
  - Tsonga: 96.5%
  - Other: 3.5%
- Time zone: UTC+2 (SAST)

Tiyani is a village situated on the banks of the Middle Letaba Dam in the Hlanganani District of the former Gazankulu homeland, which currently form part of the Vhembe District Municipality in the Limpopo province of South Africa.

Before Waterval (next to the Elim Hospital) was developed, Tiyani used to house the Hlanganani Regional court and the Hlanganani Police station. Today it houses the second Magistrate court in the former Hlanganani district, the New Tiyani Magistrate court, which was inaugurated in 2016 by the deputy minister of Justice and Constitutional development, Mr John Jeffrey. It replaced the now defunct Tiyani branch court, which was established in 1960. The Tiyani Branch Court was, for a short period (between 1982 and 2015), an outpost of Hlanganani Regional Court in Waterval, Elim. The Hlanganani Police station has remained at Tiyani, while the new Waterval Police Station, together with Hlanganani Regional court were established by the Gazankulu Administration at the Waterval township in 1980, next to the Elim Hospital.

Officially the settlement is known as Tiyani, but the area is popularly known (by both the Venda and Tsonga people) as Magoro and was named after a Venda Chief Magoro, who occupied the area before the Tsonga people arrived. The Tsonga people arrived here as refugees from Mozambique during the wars of Manukosi, also known as Soshangane. Forced removal of Venda people took place during the 1960s when Tiyani was declared a Tsonga area and incorporated into Gazankulu homeland. Magoro was also a site where a group of 60 Boer commandos, directed by Joao Albasini and Head chief of VaTsonga, Chief General Nwa-Manugu (the Commander in chief of Joao ), attacked its people, massacred more than 300 people and killed Chief Magoro's son. The military campaign was carried out because chief Magoro had refused to pay tax levied by Joao Albasini and because of his continued support for King Makhado.

== Borders of Tiyani ==
Tiyani is bordered by Middle Letaba River on the south, Ntsuxi Village on the East, Ribungwani Village on the North, Masakona Village on the North West, Mamaila on the West and Olifantshoek (Holofani) on the South West.

== Sections of Tiyani ==
Tiyani consists of different Chiefdom's who were placed in the area after the removal of Magoro. These are Chief Xihimu, Chief Mdono, Chief Manghove, Chief Mangurwani and Chief Nkanyani. The names of the original sections are derived from the Chiefs' names based on their sections of the settlement. Second generation sections were created with people from different chiefs - depending on which Chief granted permission for the stand owner, who would be a subject of that particular chief. The Second generation sections are Vata Fika, Tsema ra ha vona (pass-over before the sun sets, ghosts), Russia, Manyunyu, Hluvula Baji, Meke, Vayizamile and Wisa Galaza.

Education Facilities There are a number of pre-school centres. Five Primary Schools are based at Tiyani namely: Goza Primary School; Kulani Primary School; Vulani Primary School, Vungela Primary School and Nkanyani Primary School. Secondary Education is catered for by four schools namely: Akani High School, Mahlorhi High School, Tiyani Secondary School and N'wamalobye High School.

== Health Facilities ==
Two health facilities are available to service the community, a clinic in the eastern side at Xihimu Section and a Main Health Center (to be formally named after the late nurse - Nurse Betty Nkanyani Hospital) on the western side. One of the first Pioneers a.k.a. Nkiyasi Betty N'wa Klaas and her apprentice and co-founder Nurse Roselet Nkanyani, who walked from house to house back in the days, treating people for Glaucoma Eye Disease and teaching hygiene awareness. Later, people would be gathered under a marula tree where the Clinic/hospital currently is.

== Economic Activities ==
Large scale subsistence farming is practiced at Tiyani with small scale commercial farming also taking place. Some businesses developed as a result of farming, like the mill where maize is being milled into maize meal. Different businesses can be found in the area, some of them specialty businesses. Mamba Complex hosts the biggest supermarket in the area - also a variety of other supermarkets, spaza shops and a number of street vendors.

A number of ATM's can be found in the village representing some of the main national banks.
