= Valdezia =

Valdezia Albasini
- Location within Limpopo Location within South Africa
- Coordinates: 23.107°S 30.189°E
- Country: South Africa
- Province: Limpopo
- District: Vhembe
- Municipality: Makhado

Area
  - Total: 16.41 km^{2} (6.34 sq mi)

Population (2011)
  - Total: 7,516
  - Density: 458.0/km^{2} (1,186/sq mi)

Racial makeup (2011)
  - Black African: 99.9%
  - Coloured: 0.1%

First languages (2011)
  - Tsonga: 87.9%
  - Venda: 10.2%
  - Other: 1.9%
- Time zone: UTC+2 (SAST)
- Postal code (street): 0935
- PO box: 0935

Valdezia is a sprawling rural settlement situated at the foothills of the Soutpansberg mountain range in Louis Trichardt, Limpopo Province, South Africa. It was formerly known as Albasini before Swiss Missionaries renamed it Valdezia in 1875. The village itself was formally established in 1820 by Tsonga refugees who were fleeing despotic rule from Soshangane. It is roughly 10 km east of Elim Hospital in the Hlanganani district in the former Gazankulu homeland, South Africa. It was the site of a Swiss mission station, and it was named after the Swiss canton of Vaud. Valdezia's population, according to the official census of 2011, currently stands at between 7,600 and 8,000 people. It is considered the birthplace of the written Tsonga language in South Africa.

== Joao Albasini ==
When Soshangane invaded the Tsonga country, large numbers of Tsonga people fled and settled at Valdezia and Bungeni. Around the 1840s, Joao Albasini, a Portuguese adventurer, joined the Tsonga people and made himself their tribal chief. Albasini was a warmonger and he established a powerful Tsonga army, consisting of 2,000 men. After the death of Joao Albasini in 1888, the Afrikaner people took over Albasini's Tsonga army and used it to wage war against the unconquered Venda alongside the Soutpansberg mountain range.

In 1875, the Swiss Missionaries were given a friendly reception by Joao Albasini and they established a Mission Station amongst the Tsonga people. In the same year, the Swiss Missionaries renamed the place from Klipfontein to Valdezia, the name derived from the Swiss canton of Vaud, where the missionaries came from. The Swiss erected a clinic and the Valdezia Primary School in 1888, which laid a foundation for future Tsonga elites. The small Valdezia clinic was a forerunner of Elim Hospital, which the Swiss established in the nearby Elim Mission Station in 1899.

The Swiss Missionaries were at first not aware that the Tsonga people had recently colonised the whole Eastern Transvaal as well as the Northern Transvaal itself, once they became aware, they quickly lay claim to all speakers of Xitsonga as their 'people' and established Mission Stations everywhere in the Transvaal where Tsonga people could be found. The most important Swiss Missions was Njhakanjhaka village, (Elim Mission Station, 1878, next to Elim Hospital), Shirley (Shirley Mission Station in 1890), next to Waterval township, Shiluvane Mission Station near Tzaneen, and Masana in Bushbuckridge, where there was a large concentration of Vatsonga people.

At Valdezia, the Tsonga people were referred to as 'Magwamba' by the Venda people, the Venda also called the Tsonga language 'Tshigwamba', while the Pedi in the South called them 'Makoepa' and their language 'Sekoapa'. The Swiss Missionaries adopted this racial slur and also called the Tsonga people 'Magwamba' and their language 'Xigwamba'. After an ethnographic and scientific study of the 'Xigwamba language and culture' by the Swiss Missionaries, Reverend Henri Alexandra Junod and Reverend Ernest Creux, they correctly named the language 'Xitsonga' and the speakers Vatsonga or just Tsonga. Junod and Creux are credited by Tsonga intellectuals and Academic as the first people to create a sense of 'nationalism' amongst the Tsonga in South Africa. The Swiss Mission Church further built Tsonga pride when they changed the name of the church to Tsonga Presbyterian Church in 1960.

The 'Valdezia Ward' at Elim Hospital was named after Valdezia. The Ward was officially opened in 1975, the 100 year anniversary of the founding of the Swiss Mission Station, by the Gazankulu Government. The Swiss missionaries who started Valdezia Mission Station are the same Missionaries who started Elim Hospital in 1899.

Swiss missionaries withdrew from Valdezia and Elim in 1994 when the dawn of democracy came to South Africa. The only thing that is left at Valdezia are the graves of missionaries and their families, the graves are in bad conditions as there are no Swiss community to take care of the graves. The graves were restored during the 140 year celebrations of the Evangelical Presbyterian Church(Swiss Mission) held in valdezia on 8–12 July 2015. The grave of Mrs Berthoud was turned into a monument alongside the grave of Mrs Shihlomulo who was the first convert to the Evangelical Presbyterian Church in Valdezia. Despite the intervention by the Swiss Missionaries, Valdezia remains an underdeveloped area, the only development that has happened in the last few years was the development of the Mambedi Country Lodge. A church conference centre is currently being built and the original Church has been turned into a museum.

Valdezia is still owned and managed by the Swiss agency known as the Evangelical Presbyterian Church. Unlike in the past where the Swiss missionaries used to run the village and the church, the current leadership of the Presbyterian Church is composed solely of Tsonga people, but the Church in Switzerland still take some of the major decisions concerning the activities of the church and the village of Valdezia.

== Birthplace of Xitsonga language ==
In 1876, the Swiss Missionaries, Reverend Paul Berthoud and Reverend Ernest Creux, who were based at the Valdezia Mission Station, started the process of translating the Bible from French into Xitsonga. Valdezia is a birthplace of the modern written Tsonga language. During the late 1880s and early 1890s, Reverend Junod and Reverend Henry Berthoud (Younger brother to Reverend Paul Berthoud) studied 'Xigwamba' and realised that Xigwamba is a collection of various dialect of people from the east coast. According to Berthoud and Junod, 'Xigwamba' consist of dialect from Ronga, Tswa (Xitswa), Chopi and 'Xigwamba' (Tsonga). These east coast dialects were blended together to form a new language, which the Swiss named Xitsonga. According to Rev Junod, Ronga, Tswa and Chopi are so similar and related to 'Xigwamba' to an extent that they cannot be regarded as independent languages but rather, a dialects of 'Xigwamba'.

As a result, Berthoud and Junod established a single standard for all these east coast dialects, known today as Xitsonga. The Swiss missionaries also realised that the Magwamba of Spelenkon were not a homogeneous group, rather they were a collection of various tribes from the east coast, that is; the Vahlanganu, Tembe, Chopi, Hlengwe, Nkuna, Khoza, Mabunda, Maluleke, etc. but they all spoke a similar dialect of 'Xigwamba'. Once a new language was formed, the word 'Xigwamba' fell into disuse and a new language, Xitsonga replaced 'Xigwamba'.

As a result, Chopi, Ronga and Tswa became extinct languages in South Africa and were swallowed or disappeared into Xitsonga. However, in Mozambique, Chopi, Ronga and Tswa continue to exist as independent languages from Xitsonga, still, the Mozambican Census continue to group Tswa, Chopi, Ronga and Xitsonga as one super language group. In the City of Maputo, for example, the language that is spoken there is Ronga and Tswa, not Xitsonga, many people tend to confuse or misinterpret the language that is spoken by people from Maputo and Matola as Xitsonga, that is not true. Xitsonga is not a dominant language in Maputo and Matola, in fact, Maputo and Matola are not the homelands of Vatsonga. Rather, Xitsonga is a dominant language in the Homeland of Vatsonga, which are Xai-Xai, Bilene and the Gaza Province. The Tsonga people who reside in Maputo and Matola are recent arrivals and did not originate in the area, where traditionally the Tswa and Ronga people were found.

Nonetheless, Tswa, Chopi and Ronga are grammatically very similar and related to Xitsonga to an extent that in South Africa, the Swiss Missionary and Anthropologist, Dr Henri-Alexandra Junod, decided that Tswa and Ronga are not independent languages, they are just a dialect of Xitsonga and must therefore be swallowed by Xitsonga. According to Dr Junod, 98% of grammar that is found in Tswa and Ronga are also found in Xitsonga, that is why the Swiss Missionaries came to a conclusion that Xitsonga is a mother body of Tswa and Ronga, because there is only 2% difference between Ronga, Tswa and Xitsonga.

== Traditional leadership ==
Valdezia has been a "Community Authority" since 1875 and does not belong to any tribal authorities in the area, it is independent from any form of despotic tribal rule. However, Chief Njhakanjhaka, a major tribal chief living at a village in front of Elim Hospital, was the only major Tsonga Chief in the whole Spelonken district that exercised authority over the Tsonga refugees that were scattered all over Spelonken hills, including Valdezia. Njhakanjhaka exercised authority over all the Tsonga refugees in the area known today as Hlanganani and was recognised as such by the scattered Tsonga refugees everywhere in the Spelonken district. But Joao Albasini, a Portuguese adventurer, also claimed authority over the Tsonga refugees in the Spelonken district. With all the military abilities, Njhakanjhaka was undermined by Albasini, who declared himself a paramount chief for all Vatsonga of Spelenkon and the Tsonga also recognised Albasini as their Chief as well. The result was that the authority of chief Njhakanjhaka was reduced to five small villages, which are: Elim, Shirley, Lemana, Waterval and Njhakanjhaka only.

Valdezia was a stronghold and a power base for Joao Albasini's rule and he ruled Valdezia until he died in 1888. As paramount chief for all Tsonga refugees in the Spelonken district, Albasini appointed all the headman in villages in a place known today as Hlanganani. Before the arrival of the Swiss Missionaries, Valdezia was formerly known as "eka-Albasini" by the local Tsonga refugees, meaning "Albasini Village". When Albasini died in 1888, no successor was appointed to lead the Tsonga people and the Valdezia Chieftainship fell into disuse.

Before the death of Joao Albasini, the Swiss Missionaries used the policy of "Indirect Rule" to control the Tsonga people since Joao Albasini was still a powerful tribal chief for Valdezia. Currently, Valdezia does not have a tribal chief, instead, a church council, appointed from the Swiss Mission Church, to rule the village. A dispute for chieftainship cannot be resolved easily until the Albasini family intervene because they are the tribal royal family of Valdezia. Even though chief Njhakanjhaka was known as a Paramount chief of all Tsonga refugees of Spelonken, he cannot claim chieftainship over Valdezia because he was defeated (not by war) by Joao Albasini over the control of the Tsonga refugees.
