= Waterval =

Waterval Njhakanjhaka
- Location within Limpopo Location within South Africa
- Coordinates: 23.159°S 30.068°E
- Country: South Africa
- Province: Limpopo
- District: Vhembe
- Municipality: Makhado
- Main Place: Elim, Limpopo

Area
  - Total: 3.60 km^{2} (1.39 sq mi)

Population (2011)
  - Total: 7,712
  - Density: 2,140/km^{2} (5,550/sq mi)

Racial makeup (2011)
  - Black African: 99.6%
  - Coloured: 0.1%
  - Indian/Asian: 0.2%
  - Other: 0.1%

First languages (2011)
  - Tsonga: 80.2%
  - Venda: 15.1%
  - Other: 4.7%
- Time zone: UTC+2 (SAST)
- Postal code (street): 1739

Waterval is a residential township situated in front of Elim Hospital, in the Hlanganani district of the former Tsonga homeland of Gazankulu. It lies along the R578 road to Giyani in the Limpopo province of South Africa. Waterval includes Njhakanjhaka, Lemana, Elim Hospital, Elim Mall, Hubyeni Shopping Centre and Magangeni, but excludes Shirley village, which is a separate farm. Shirley shares a legal boundary with Waterval and Mbhokota village to the east.

According to mid-2015 population statistics by Statistics South Africa, Waterval had a population of about 9,000 people. It forms part of the Njhakanjhaka Traditional Authority, also referred to as the Elim/Shirley Traditional Authority, which had a combined population of more than 22,000 people in 2015.

The Njhakanjhaka Traditional Authority or Elim/Shirley Traditional Authority proper includes Mbhokota, Bokisi, Chavani, Riverplaats and Nwaxinyamani, with a total population of more than 42,000 people. Due to apartheid policies of the 1960s, the land of the Njhakanjhaka Traditional Authority was reduced to Waterval, Shirley, Lemana and Elim, while the villages of Mbhokota, Bokisi, Chavani, Milaboni, Riverplaats, Tzaneen and Nwaxinyamani were placed under the administration of Chief Njhakanjhaka's firstborn son, Chief Chavani Njhakanjhaka Mukhari. These villages are collectively known as the Nkhensani Tribal Authority, under Hosi Chavani. The offices of the Nkhensani Tribal Authority are located at Chavani village, behind the township of Waterval.

== Governance ==
Waterval was proclaimed a township in 1980 by the former Gazankulu homeland, in the district of Hlanganani. It also forms part of the Njhakanjhaka Traditional Authority.

The Hlanganani Regional Court for the District of Hlanganani (often incorrectly referred to as the "Waterval Magistrate's Court"), the historic Elim Hospital, Waterval Post Office, Police Station, Hubyeni Shopping Centre and Elim Mall are all located in Waterval.

Before the arrival of Swiss missionaries in the area, Chief Njhakanjhaka exercised traditional authority over the region. During the 1950s until the late 1960s, apartheid officials of the Department of Bantu Affairs and Development referred to this western portion of Gazankulu as the Tsonga "finger".

Following the end of apartheid in 1994, Waterval became part of the Makhado Local Municipality, which falls under the Vhembe District Municipality.

== Tsonga trading posts in the interior ==
In 1554, Lourenço Marques, a Portuguese trader, settled on Tsonga land and began trading between Portugal and Africa. Between 1554 and 1800, the Tsonga people gradually moved away from the east coast and established trade routes into the interior, covering much of the eastern and northern Transvaal. During this period, the Tsonga traded with both the Venda and the Pedi, although they did not settle permanently in these areas. Goods exchanged included beads, clothing, maize, firearms, soap and shoes, which the Tsonga obtained from the Portuguese. In return, the Venda supplied ivory and iron.

The Venda, who were skilled ironworkers, traded iron with the Tsonga, while the Tsonga introduced maize to the Venda in exchange. Prior to this exchange, the Venda relied on sorghum as a staple food. Following the introduction of maize, it became the primary staple, and both the Tsonga and Venda referred to it as vuswa (Tsonga) or vhuswa (Venda). Maize was introduced to the Tsonga by Vasco da Gama in 1497, during a brief stay in the region he named "Terra da Boa Gente" (Land of the Friendly People) before continuing his voyage to India. Da Gama and the Portuguese had obtained maize from South America, where it was indigenous, via their colony of Portuguese Brazil (modern-day Brazil).

As trade expanded, the Tsonga established trading stations in the interior. These were gradually developed into small villages, serving as secure bases to protect traders from robbery, since the stations were guarded continuously. Some Tsonga traders remained at these stations and settled permanently, often within Venda and Pedi communities. For more than 250 years, however, the Tsonga treated the eastern and northern Transvaal primarily as trading zones rather than areas for settlement or colonisation.

Full-scale settlement, described as "internal colonisation", began around 1820, following the invasion of the Tsonga homeland by Soshangane (also known as Manukosi). The conflict forced large numbers of Tsonga refugees into the eastern and northern Transvaal. These areas were already familiar to the Tsonga through centuries of trade. Over the following decades, Tsonga refugees established permanent communities, and by 1900, large parts of the eastern and northern Transvaal were settled by Tsonga people. The site of present-day Waterval was one such historic Tsonga trading station, long known to the Tsonga before permanent settlement, although it was not yet called Waterval.

Chief Njhakanjhaka and his followers arrived in the area between 1818 and 1820 as refugees from Mozambique during the wars of Soshangane. Njhakanjhaka, one of several Tsonga leaders who resisted Soshangane’s authority, was defeated by Nguni forces under his command. To avoid execution and further conflict, Njhakanjhaka led his people to settle at what is now Waterval.

Njhakanjhaka was regarded as one of the chiefs of Spelonken (present-day Valdezia, Elim, Nwa-Xinyamani, Bungeni, Chavani, Mbhokota, Shirley and the wider Hlanganani area). As headman of Spelonken, he exercised authority over a significant population; the 1905 Transvaal census recorded about 50,000 Tsonga speakers in the district. Njhakanjhaka's authority, however, was challenged by João Albasini, who established himself as paramount chief over the Vatsonga in the Hlanganani area. Following Albasini’s death in 1888, Njhakanjhaka reasserted aspects of his chieftainship.

By that time, however, Swiss missionaries had already established Valdezia, and Njhakanjhaka was unable to regain his authority there. Many Tsonga headmen across Spelonken, including those in Bungeni, Nwa-Xinyamani and Chavani, declared independence from Njhakanjhaka's rule, forming their own polities. While Njhakanjhaka continued to be recognised as a senior leader among the Vatsonga, his effective authority was reduced.

Njhakanjhaka reportedly had 33 wives and more than 100 children.

== History ==
The history of Waterval is closely linked to the establishment of the Swiss Mission Station in Elim in 1878 and the founding of Elim Hospital in 1899. Before 1878, the Swiss Mission Station had been located in Valdezia, about 10 km east of Elim. The missionaries relocated from Valdezia to Waterval due to widespread illness caused by malaria.

The Farm Waterval comprised the land on which Elim Hospital, Njhakanjhaka and Rivoni are situated, but excluded Shirley.

== Tsonga finger ==
From the 1950s until the late 1960s, the areas of Waterval, Elim, Shirley, Chavani, Mbhokota, Riverplaats, Nwaxinyamani, Bokisi, Bungeni, Valdezia and Nkuzana were collectively referred to as the "Tsonga finger". The territory was situated within what the Apartheid government designated as a White area near the town of Louis Trichardt, and the threat of forced removals was significant.

The apartheid government attempted, without success, to remove the Tsonga from Waterval and surrounding areas. By the late 1960s, following negotiations between the South African government and Professor Hudson William Edison Ntsanwisi, the "Tsonga finger" was incorporated into Gazankulu, along with Elim Hospital.

== Adjacent areas ==
=== Shirley ===
The village of Shirley is located north of Waterval and is divided into four sections: the settlement directly above Waterval, the settlement on top of the mountain, the settlement below the mountain, and Akanani, which is the most recent addition. Shirley is also the home of Vonani Bila, a poet, writer and performer.

=== Rivoni ===
Rivoni is regarded as the original home of Chief Njhakanjhaka and houses the Njhakanjhaka Traditional Authority offices, where tribal meetings are held at Hubyeni. The Rivoni School for the Blind is also situated here. SABC presenter Rhulani Baloyi was born in Rivoni and attended the Rivoni School for the Blind.

=== Elim ===
The village of Elim derives its name from the historic Elim Hospital. Several prominent individuals have family connections to Elim. Former commissioner of the Independent Electoral Commission of South Africa, Pansy Tlakula, was married in Elim, and her husband's family, the Tlakulas, own land in the area. The Elim Mall is situated on land owned by the Tlakula family. In a broader sense, "Elim" refers to Njhakanjhaka village, Rivoni and Lemana, but excludes Waterval and Shirley.

=== Elim Hospital ===
The establishment of Elim Hospital in 1899 was made possible through the involvement of Chief Njhakanjhaka, Hakamela Tlakula's grandfather, and Job Makhubele. In 1897, Chief Njhakanjhaka leased land on behalf of the Tlakula and Makhubele families to Swiss missionaries for a period of 100 years. Prior to this, the western half of the land where the hospital was built was owned by the Tlakula family, and the eastern half by the Makhubele family, who later changed their surname to Lowane.

The Lowane family continues to reside in Elim, along the R578 road, opposite Elim Mall. The Tlakula family resides behind Elim Mall, opposite Elim Hospital. Both families hold title deeds to the land where Elim Hospital is situated. Informal traders who operate in front of Elim Hospital reportedly pay rent to the Tlakula family.

Elim Hospital remains a well-known health facility in South Africa and has historical links to Switzerland, where many of the missionaries originated. The Swiss missionaries also contributed to the spread of Christianity in the Elim area.

=== Elim Mall ===
The Tlakula family owns the land on which Elim Mall was developed. The family reportedly receives 60% of the mall's profits, while the developer, Twin City, receives 40%. Land negotiations reportedly lasted more than five years before development began. The mall is managed by Basani Tlakula, a member of the Tlakula family.

=== Hubyeni Shopping Centre ===
Hubyeni Shopping Centre is situated on land owned by the Njhakanjhaka Traditional Authority. During negotiations with Kerr Development, 10% of the shareholding was allocated to the authority, representing the Elim/Shirley community.

=== Lemana Multi-purpose Centre ===
Formerly a college of education, Lemana has been an important institution for the Tsonga community, with many Vatsonga receiving their education there. Eduardo Mondlane, former President of FRELIMO, studied at Lemana.

=== Vatsonga Cultural Village ===
The Vatsonga Cultural Village is situated on top of Ribolla Mountain and is dedicated to the history and culture of the Tsonga people. From this vantage point, 29 villages can be seen below the mountain. The cultural village was established in response to concerns that Tsonga cultural practices were under threat from European influences. It showcases Tsonga architecture and lifestyle. Construction of the village reportedly cost the government more than R1 million.

== Njhakanjhaka royal lineage and succession ==
- Xilumani (born in Mozambique, date of birth unknown; died in Waterval/Shirley)
- Shinguwa (date of birth unknown; died in Waterval/Shirley)
- Njhakanjhaka I (died in 1930 at Waterval farm, now part of Shirley village)
- Njhakanjhaka II (crowned in 1995; died in 2007 at Shirley village)
- Njhakanjhaka III (crowned in 2011 at Shirley village; current ruler and chief of the Elim/Shirley community)
