= Beitbridge, South Africa =

Beitbridge Beitbrug
- Location within Limpopo Location within South Africa
- Coordinates: 22.231°S 29.987°E
- Country: South Africa
- Province: Limpopo
- District: Vhembe
- Municipality: Musina

Area
  - Total: 0.94 km^{2} (0.36 sq mi)

Population (2011)
  - Total: 1,001
  - Density: 1,100/km^{2} (2,800/sq mi)

Racial makeup (2011)
  - Black African: 97.2%
  - Coloured: 0.9%
  - Indian/Asian: 0.6%
  - White: 1.0%
  - Other: 0.3%

First languages (2011)
  - Venda: 45.5%
  - Northern Sotho: 32.7%
  - English: 10.0%
  - Afrikaans: 6.4%
  - Other: 5.5%
- Time zone: UTC+2 (SAST)
- Area code: 015

Beitbridge (Afrikaans: Beitbrug) is a town in Musina Local Municipality in the Limpopo province of South Africa.

Beitbridge is a border crossing on the Limpopo River, located just south of Beitbridge in Zimbabwe. It is the busiest border post in the region, handling as many as 500 trucks each day. The bridge was named the Alfred Beit Road Bridge, after mining financier Alfred Beit, who provided funds for its construction.

== Climate ==
Beitbridge has a hot desert climate (Köppen: BWh).

Climate data for Beitbridge
Month	Jan	Feb	Mar	Apr	May	Jun	Jul	Aug	Sep	Oct	Nov	Dec	Year
Daily mean °C (°F)	27.4 (81.3)	26.9 (80.4)	25.7 (78.3)	23.4 (74.1)	19.8 (67.6)	16.7 (62.1)	16.7 (62.1)	19.0 (66.2)	22.4 (72.3)	25.3 (77.5)	26.2 (79.2)	26.8 (80.2)	23.0 (73.4)
Average precipitation mm (inches)	70 (2.8)	56 (2.2)	31 (1.2)	22 (0.9)	7 (0.3)	4 (0.2)	1 (0.0)	1 (0.0)	7 (0.3)	24 (0.9)	49 (1.9)	61 (2.4)	333 (13.1)
Source: Climate-Data.org
