= Maluleke =

Van'wanati Maluleke
VaN'wanati

Regions with significant populations
- South Africa (Limpopo), Mozambique, Zimbabwe

Languages
- Xitsonga

Religion
- African traditional religion, Christianity

Related ethnic groups
- Tsonga people, Venda people

The Van'wanati Maluleke (also Maluleke or Maluleka people) are a Tsonga subgroup primarily living in South Africa, Mozambique and Zimbabwe. Their history stretches from the African Great Lakes region to the Limpopo River valley. The Maluleke dynasty was founded by Malenga wa Gunyule in the mid‑17th century and later expanded under his son Maxakadzi. Today the Maluleke are organised into several Traditional Authorities in South Africa, with the Mhinga royal house considered paramount.

== Early origins ==
The Van'wanati trace their ancestry to Bantu‑speaking peoples who moved south due to Arab raids and the drying of a large freshwater lake in Sudan. One group, the Beja Tonga, settled in areas that are now Uganda, Malawi, Tanzania, northern Zambia and northern Mozambique. These early people were among the first Bantu groups to encounter the San people, from whom they learned to use bows and arrows skilfully. Other Bantu groups called them Vacopi – "people skilled with the bow and arrow".

The Vacopi later moved further south to southern Mozambique. One large group settled next to the Nwanati River and took its name, becoming the Nwanati people. VaN'wanati means "people of Nwanati". A subgroup that particularly liked the kwakwa fruit became known as the Makwakwa.

== Malenga, the founder ==
The Maluleke name comes from Malenga, a son of Gunyule, King of the Vacopi. Around the middle of the 17th century, Malenga left his father's land because his people needed more space for farming and food. He settled at a place called Pfukwe and is remembered as the founder of the Maluleke dynasty.

Malenga had three important sons:

- Muswana – the eldest, killed in battle
- Nxelwa (also Ntshelwa or Ncelwa)
- Maxakadzi

Malenga was buried at Pfukwe together with Muswana. Because Muswana had died, Maxakadzi became the next leader.

== Maxakadzi builds a nation ==
Maxakadzi was a great hunter, warrior and elephant hunter who traded in ivory, copper, gold and other goods. His trading post at Vilankulu (Nyembani, near Inhambane) belonged to the Van'wanati, showing they were also important traders with connections as far as India, the Middle East and East Asia.

He expanded the Maluleke kingdom by absorbing other Tsonga clans and by waging war on neighbouring Venda groups (Vangona and Vanyai), pushing as far as the Zoutpansberg mountains and the Manumu River near the Tropic of Capricorn.

=== Sacred places ===
Maxakadzi established his main villages inside what is now the Kruger National Park:

- Nyandweni – between Pafuri and Babalala rest camp. Here he discovered trees he named MNyandu (still used in Xitsonga), which blossom in summer with sweet‑scented ripambeta flowers.
- Mashakadzi – near the present Shingwedzi camp.

Nyandweni remains a sacred place for the Maluleke.

=== Praise poem ===
The Van'wanati have a praise poem that encapsulates their identity:

Hi Van'wanati, hi va dyi va bangu hina;
Hi va ka nkala na visi bya yona;
Va ka tindlopfu a ti luvani, ti luvana hi minxakwa;
Va ka macimba ya tihuku ya lema rihlelo;
Hi va ka xinyela-babeni hina;
Hi va ka xixanga xivi xi endla magego:
Va ka betsa ra matsala-tsala;
Va mafula hi xivuri hi tshika nyundzu;
Va ka timamba a ti luvani, ti luvana hi mincila;
Gunyule!

Key elements:

- Bangu – a drink taken before war to make warriors brave.
- Nkala (meerkat) – indicates they once lived in caves.
- Xinyela-babeni – another name for Gunyule.
- Betsa/Beja – refers to the ancestor Beja, son of Tsonga.
- Vamafula hi xivuri – fighting with bare hands after taking bangu.
- Vaka timamba (of the mamba snake) – came after Ximambana.

== Succession and the two sections ==
Before his death, Maxakadzi ordered that he be buried in southern Mozambique (his grave is still there under the Guyu branch). He divided his land among his sons and nephews. After his death, two main sections emerged:

1. Northern section – led by Shimambani (also Dlhamani or Ximambani), with the main kraal at the confluence of the Levhubu and Limpopo rivers.
2. Southern section – led by Guyu, around present‑day Mapai in Mozambique.

Most elders and people followed Shimambani as the rightful heir. According to Tsonga custom, although Shimambani was the biological son of Maxakadzi, he was considered the son of Muswana (the eldest son of Malenga) and therefore the rightful successor. The Manganyi of Bungu family also recognised Shimambani as heir to their eldest daughter.

== 19th‑century history ==
=== Branches from Malenga ===
- From Muswana wa Malenga (through Shimambani): Mhinga Traditional Authority, Xigalo Traditional Authority, Xigalo‑Muhunguti (others such as Tsuvuka, Nkomisi, Huhlwani, Xihahela, Mapikane disintegrated in the late 1800s/early 1900s).
- From Ncelwa wa Malenga: Xikundu Traditional Authority, Mulamula Traditional Authority (both followed Shimambani).
- From Maxakadzi wa Malenga: Hlaneki, Nkuri, Majeje, Muyexe, Makuleke (all followed Shimambani).

=== The Van Rensburg battle ===
In 1836, the Voortrekker leader Van Rensburg and his party were killed by forces of the Shimambani Maluleke section in what would become the Northern Transvaal. This made the Maluleke the first Africans in southern Africa to kill so many colonialists in such a short time. Later, Louis Trichardt reached the kraal of Nkuri Sakana, where he was not permitted to go further, and eventually learned that Van Rensburg's party had been led into an ambush by Nkuri Sakana's forces.

=== Mhinga becomes leader ===
Mhinga Shilungwa became an important Maluleke leader, followed by his son Sunduza Mhinga. Under Mhinga the Maluleke lived in what later became the Kruger National Park. Government policy between 1906 and 1912 removed the areas of Mhinga and Shikundu from the Shingwedzi Game Reserve, forcing the people to move out.

== Relationship with other groups ==
Many groups lived under Van'wanati authority, including Mashava, Xirinda, Mavambe, Chauke and Hlomela. The white trader Joao Albasini (of French ancestry) settled in the Zoutpansberg long after the Maluleke had arrived. He was associated mainly with mixed populations in the Spelonken hills, but many immigrant groups remained independent of him. An 1879 estimate counted about 10,000 fighting men called "Magwamba" under some 30 independent chiefs in the area.

== Early 20th century ==
The 1904 census recorded 82,325 Tsonga in the Transvaal (excluding those working in Johannesburg), of whom 48,117 were in the Zoutpansberg district. The largest Maluleke group was the Maluleke of Mhinga (later under Sunduza) with 4,014 people. Other Tsonga groups included the Baloyi, Hlabi, Hlengwe and Nkuna.

Chiefs noted at the time:

- Mhinga – a very old man, still influential, his head kraal about 80 miles north‑east of Louis Trichardt.
- Mavambe – intelligent and well disposed to Europeans; helped the Boers against the Venda chief Mpefu in 1898.
- Sikundu (Shikundu) – lived between Mhinga and Mavambe, considered the most influential Tsonga after Mhinga.

== Modern era ==
=== Division of land ===
The Berlin Conference (1884–1885) divided Maluleke territory among three countries:

- South Africa
- Mozambique
- Zimbabwe

Today most of the traditional Maluleke land lies inside the Limpopo Transfrontier Park (which includes the Kruger National Park). Part of this land was successfully claimed back by the Makuleke community, led by a descendant of Makahlule, one of Maxakadzi's sons.

The name Malamulele came from an event when "Mhinga rebelled against the Venda".

=== Maluleke in South Africa ===
The Maluleke in Limpopo Province are organised under several Traditional Authorities that claim descent from Malenga wa Gunyule:

- From Muswana wa Malenga: Mhinga Traditional Authority, Xigalo Traditional Authority (chieftainships such as Tsuvuka, Chavani, Huhlwani broke down in the late 1800s/early 1900s and have not been restored).
- From Ntshelwa wa Malenga: Xikundu Traditional Authority, Mulamula Traditional Authority.
- From Maxakadzi wa Malenga: Hlaneki, Nkuri, Majeje, Muyexe, Makuleke, Xigalo‑Muhunguti.

=== Maluleke in Mozambique ===
Led by Hosi Mapai (Guyu wa Maxakadzi branch). Sub‑chiefs: N'wazulu, Hasani, Matsilele, Salani, Mahungu, and the Xikhumba branch.

=== Maluleke in Zimbabwe ===
Represented by the chieftainship of Xikole wa Ximambani (Shimambani) branch, living around Chiredzi.

=== Bantustan years ===
The Bantu Authorities Act of 1951 created tribal and regional authorities. The Vhembe regional authority included Tsonga chiefs (with Chief Adolf Sunduza Mhinga as the most powerful) alongside Venda and North Sotho chiefs. Because Venda chiefs had more voting power, Tsonga members objected. Their opposition led to the Bantu Self‑Government Act of 1959, which declared the Tsonga/Shangaan a "national unit". New Tsonga‑dominated regional authorities were formed, first under Chief Mhinga and later under Professor Hudson Ntsan'wisi, eventually creating the Gazankulu bantustan for Tsonga people under apartheid.

== Paramountcy of the Mhinga royal house ==
The historical and political structure rests on the paramountcy of the Mhinga chieftainship:

- Mhinga Shilungwa allocated land to chiefs such as Xikundu, Xigalo and Mavambe.
- Although some sub‑chiefs later gained colonial recognition as independent from the Mhinga royal house, Makuleke was never granted this status and remained subordinate. Evidence includes: the Mhinga royal house collected taxes in Makuleke areas, heard court appeals from Makuleke, and received tribute (ndzuvo) from Headman Makuleke as late as 1966.
- Mavambe, though from the Manganyi clan, is related to the Maluleke through the Bungu family.
- A further level of subordination: Qaza was a "petty ndhuna (xamuganga)" of Makuleke.

Colonial intervention altered the traditional hierarchy by granting independence to some sub‑chiefs, thereby breaking the unity of the paramountcy but leaving Makuleke in a dependent position.

== See also ==
- Tsonga people
- Gazankulu
- Kruger National Park

== Sources ==
- Harries, P. 1987. "A Forgotten Corner of the Transvaal: Reconstructing the History of a Relocated Community through Oral Testimony and Song". In Bozzoli, B. (ed.) Class, Community and Conflict: South African Perspectives. Johannesburg: Ravan Press, pp. 93–134.
- Massie, R.H. 1905. The Native Tribes of the Transvaal. London: Harrison and Sons.
- Oral and documentary history of the Van'wanati Maluleke people (unpublished community records).

== Glossary of names ==
Name	Description
Beja Tonga	Early group from which Van'wanati originated
Gunyule	King of the Vacopi, father of Malenga
Guyu	Son of Maxakadzi, leader of the southern section
Malenga	Founder of the Maluleke nation
Maxakadzi	Son of Malenga, great hunter and trader
Mhinga	Important Maluleke chief, son of Nkuri
Muswana	Eldest son of Malenga, died in battle
Ntshelwa / Ncelwa	Son of Malenga
Nkuri	Maluleke leader, father of Mhinga
Shimambani	Son of Muswana, leader of the northern section and paramount to the Maluleke throne
Sunduza	Son of Mhinga, leader of Mhinga land after his father
Vacopi	Name given to early ancestors because of bow and arrow skills
Van'wanati	People who lived along the Nwanati River

Maluleke is a South African surname. Notable people with the surname include:

- Dan Maluleke (born 1943), South African former politician
- Ishmael Maluleke (born 1977), South African former footballer
- Jabulani Maluleke (born 1982), South African footballer
- Jeff Maluleke (born 1974), South African musician
- Johanna Maluleke (died 2021), South African politician
- Joyce Maluleke (1961–2021), South African politician
- Mugwena Maluleke (born 1963), South African trade union leader
- Risenga Maluleke (born 1963), South African politician and educator
- Wiseman Maluleke (born 1992), South African soccer player
