= Shakadza =

- Location within Limpopo Location within South Africa
- Coordinates: 22.616°S 30.571°E
- Country: South Africa
- Province: Limpopo
- District: Vhembe
- Municipality: Musina

Area
  - Total: 2.15 km^{2} (0.83 sq mi)

Population (2011)
  - Total: 1,719
  - Density: 800/km^{2} (2,070/sq mi)

Racial makeup (2011)
  - Black African: 99.8%
  - Coloured: 0.1%
  - Indian/Asian: 0.2%

First languages (2011)
  - Venda: 98.3%
  - Other: 1.7%
- Time zone: UTC+2 (SAST)
- Postal code (street): 0958
- PO box: 0958

Shakadza is a village in Musina Local Municipality in Vhembe District Municipality in the Limpopo province of South Africa. Shakadza shares borders with neighboring villages Muswodi, Mukovhawabale, Tshokotshoko, Gundani, and Tshamutora. The village is divided into four parts: Mavhuvhuni, Tshivhambe, Thondoni 1 and Thondoni 2.
