= Gazankulu =

Bantustan in South Africa (1973–1994)

Coordinates: 23.3100°S 30.7064°E

- 1973–1994
- Flag Coat of arms
- Motto: "Mintirho ya Vulavula" (Tsonga: Deeds count)
- Anthem: "Hosi Katekisa Afrika" (Tsonga: God Bless Africa)
- Location of Gazankulu (red) within South Africa (tan).
- Status: Bantustan
- Capital: Giyani
- Common languages: Tsonga; English; Afrikaans
- Chief Minister
  - 1971-1993: Hudson Ntsanwisi
  - 1993: Edward Mhinga
  - 1993-1994: Samuel Nxumalo
- History
  - Self-government: 1 February 1973
  - Re-integrated into South Africa: 27 April 1994

Area
- 1980: 7,730 km^{2} (2,980 sq mi)

Population
  - 1980: 514,220
  - 1991: 954,771
- Currency: South African rand
Preceded by	Succeeded by
Republic of South Africa	Republic of South Africa

Gazankulu was a Bantustan in South Africa, intended by the apartheid government to be a semi-independent homeland for the Tsonga people. It was located in both the Northern Transvaal, now Limpopo province and Eastern Transvaal, now Mpumalanga province.

== History ==
Gazankulu received self-rule from the central government in 1969, with its capital at Giyani. Gazankulu homeland officially starts at Elim Hospital, near Makhado, from Elim it then heads east towards the Levubu river valley, the villages of Valdezia and Bungeni being the two largest Tsonga settlements in the Levubu river valley, with a combined population of more than 50 000 people, according to the mid-2015 population statistics and stretched down up to the banks of the Sabie River near Skukuza in Hazyview in Mpumalanga. Total length of Gazankulu, from Elim Hospital to Hazyview, was 317 km long, which is a distance equivalent of travelling from Pretoria to Harrismith. The homeland consisted of the 'Mainland Gazankulu' which were Elim, Giyani and Malamulele, with 3 large exclaves, which were Bushbuckridge, Tzaneen and Phalaborwa.

Before the 1913 Land Act, Bushbuckridge, Phalaborwa and Tzaneen were not Tsonga exclaves, they were physically connected with other Tsongas of Elim, Giyani and Malamulele. The 1913 Land Act resulted in 3 large Tsonga exclaves, during the 1960s, Professor H.W.E Ntsanwisi fought unsuccessfully against the central government's unilateral land demarcations, which resulted in 3 large Tsonga exclaves. Despite Professor H.W.E Ntsanwisi's protests at unilateral land demarcations, the central government went ahead to create 3 large Tsonga exclaves, which the Tsonga people opposed unconditionally throughout the 1960s, 1970's and 1980's. Gazankulu shared borders with other black homelands, which were, Venda, Lebowa and Kangwane. These 3 other black homelands, like Gazankulu, also experienced land grabs and unfair land allocations from the central government.

== Townships of Gazankulu ==
Gazankulu had 10 formal townships, which were all created and built by the Apartheid Government from the late 1960s until the late 1980s, they are; Waterval in Elim, Giyani in Giyani, Malamulele in Malamulele, Nkowankowa in Tzaneen, Lulekani in Phalaborwa, Acornhoek in Bushbuckridge, Thulamahashe in Bushbuckridge, Dwarsloop in Bushbuckridge and Mkhuhlu in Hazyview. The above townships were curved out of land owned by local Traditional leaders or tribal chiefs. In Waterval, the land traditionally belong to Hosi Njhakanjhaka of the Mukhari-Xilumani clan, in Giyani, the land belong to Hosi Risinga of the Chabalala clan, in Nkowankowa, the land belong to Hosi Muhlava II of the Nkuna clan, in Lulekani, the land belong to Hosi Majeje(M.Ntsan'wisi) of the Maluleke clan, in Thulamahashe, the land belong to Hosi Nxumalo of the Ndwandwe-Zwide clan and in Mkhuhlu, the land belong to Hosi Hoxani of the Nkuna Clan.

== Hospitals of Gazankulu ==
Gazankulu had 9 district hospitals, which are; Elim Hospital in Elim, Nkhensani Hospital in Giyani, eVuxakeni Psychiatrist Hospital in Giyani, Malamulele Hospital in Malamulele, Letaba Hospital in Tzaneen, Shiluvane hospital in Tzaneen, Tintswalo Hospital in Bushbuckridge, Masana hospital in Bushbuckridge and Matikwana Hospital in Hazyview. In addition, these district hospitals are attached to more than 150 Community Health Centres and clinics. Masana Hospital was later, in 1976, given to Mapulana people, a close neighbour of Tsonga people in Bushbuckridge and is known today as Mapulaneng Hospital. Elim Hospital in Waterval, Masana Hospital in Bushbuckridge and Shiluvane Hospital in Tzaneen were Swiss Mission Hospitals, having established by the Swiss Missionaries who brought Gospel to the Tsonga people.

== Shopping Centres of Gazankulu ==
Gazankulu had 16 modern shopping centres, which are; Bindzulani in Nkowankowa; Elim Mall in Elim, Hubyeni Shopping Centre in Elim, Giyani Regional Mall, Masingita shopping complex (Giyani), Masingita Mall (Giyani), Masingita Plaza (Giyani), Malamulele Crossing (Malamulele), Mangalani Shopping complex (Malamulele), Acornhoek Plaza (Bushbuckridge), Acornhoek Mall (Bushbuckridge), Thulamahashe Plaza (Bushbuckridge), Thula Mall in Thulamahashe (Bushbuckridge), Dwarsloop Mall (Bushbuckridge), Twin City Bushbuckridge (Bushbuckridge) and Mkhuhlu Plaza (Hazyview).

== Industrial Zones of Gazankulu ==
There were two major Industrial Zones in Gazankulu, which were Ritavi in Tzaneen and Mkhuhlu in Hazyview. All Investments in the Homeland of Gazankulu were concentrated in these two towns, which were also Industrial Zones in the former Transvaal Province.

== Forced Removals and land reduction ==
The land of the Tsonga people proper starts from Elim Hospital near Makhado / Louis Trichardt and ends in Skukuza near Hazyview in Mpumalanga Province. From the year 1899 until the 1960s, the land was cut off into small pieces by the Colonial Government until the Tsonga land was reduced to four territories. The cutting off of Tsonga land was in line with the 1913 Land Act, where 13% of South African land was allocated to Homelands.

Under the leadership of Professor H.W.E Ntsanwisi, Gazankulu has successfully resisted forced removal of Tsonga people in the following areas during the 1960s, Elim Shirley community, the central government has already finalised the plan to forcibly remove the Tsonga from Elim Shirley farms and to dump them at an arid place in around Malamulele. Professor Ntsanwisi successfully challenged the government of the day against the forced removal of the Elim Shirley community, to this day, the Tsonga people at Elim Shirley still enjoy their land rights. Elim Hospital, which was also scheduled to be removed into a village in Malamulele, is today a living Tsonga monument within the Elim Shirley community.

Valdezia community, the only remaining Tsonga community in the heart of the Levubu river, was also threatened with forced removal during the 1960s, the central government has already finalised the removal of the entire community to an unknown location. With regards to Valdezia, Professor Ntsanwisi has issued a warning and declaration of war against the central government, he told Pretoria during the 1970s that "there will be bloodshed if the central government goes ahead and forcibly remove the people of Valdezia", the threat to forcibly remove the people of Valdezia went on until 1984 when the South African government announced that "Valdezia will no longer be removed as originally planned by the central government, rather it will be retained as a detached area of Gazankulu". For more than 18-years, Professor Ntsanwisi successfully resisted the forced removal of the people of Valdezia, to this day, the community of Valdezia still enjoy their land rights, which would not be possible today should the central government had gone ahead with forced removal.

Ribolla community of Mbhokota, Chavani, Bokisi, Riverplaats and some parts of Nwaxinyamani. As the name suggests, these communities are found on the western, southern and eastern parts of Mount Ribola, a prominent landmark mountain around Elim. Forced removals were a reality in this part of Gazankulu. These lands were collectively known as the "Tsonga finger" by the apartheid government and the Tsonga people were to be removed in their great numbers, this is a proud home of the Tsonga people in the Elim area. Professor H.W.E Ntsanwisi successfully claimed back the "Tsonga finger" after the central government failed to forcibly removed the Tsonga people.

However, after the central government's failure to remove all the Tsonga people from the "Tsonga finger", they did manage to remove one Tsonga chief from his land, Hosi Bokisi in 1968. In 2016, a descendant of the late chief Bokisi managed to get back all his grandfather's land that was taken, the old Bokisi has been claimed back and chief Bokisi has demarcated residential stands, next to chavani village, alongside the Elim road.

Bungeni community, the largest Tsonga settlement in the Levubu river valley and the most populous Tsonga settlement in the whole Elim area, was, alongside its neighbour, Valdezia community, to be removed from the entire area completely and relocated into unknown location. Professor Ntsanwisi successfully claimed back the entire Bungeni community against the central government's intention to forcibly remove them from the entire Levubu valley. To this day, the Bungeni community still enjoy their land rights, a right that would not have been possible if they were removed. The Bungeni community is still waiting for the transfer of the eastern part of Nwaxinyamani village back into its tribal authority, the piece of land was stolen during the 1960s when demarcation was done between Nkhensani tribal authority (people of Chavani village) and Bungeni tribal authority (people of Bungeni). The piece of land that must transferred back to Bungeni is known as Skhosana village, which is today part of nwaxinyamani, during the 1960s, that land belonged to Hosi Makhoma Skhunyani, and if everything goes according to plan, Bungeni new stands, under Hosi Makhoma Skhunyani, will be joined with Skhosana village and form part of Hosi Makhoma's land.

== Lost chieftainship and their lands ==
Hosi Mtsetweni

During the 1960s, many Vatsonga chiefs lost their status as senior chiefs and have their lands greatly reduced when homelands were created and political boundaries demarcated. One of the most important chief in the Elim area to have his land and chieftainship taken away was Hosi Mtsetweni, a fully fledged senior chief with a vast land. After he was de-recognized by the government, he was given to Hosi Bungeni as his headman, his land greatly reduced into a very small village called ka-Mtsetweni 3 km south of Levubu Agricultural plantation. Before he was de-recognized by the government in 1960, he had the same status as Hosi Bungeni, also in terms of land mass. After the 1994 democratic elections, the new government is still trying to solve this problem through its Katla commission.

Hosi Bokisi

Another important chief in the Elim area had his chieftainship interfered with, his land was reduced into a small village on a mountain slope just east of Elim. He was given to Hosi Chavani as his headman. Hosi Bokisi, just like Hosi Mtsetweni, is a fully fledged senior chief of the Bokisi community but was reduced to a status of a headman, his land greatly reduced to few hundred hectares

Hosi Njhakanjhaka

This is a paramount chief of all Vatsonga in the whole Makhado area, his jurisdiction covers almost all areas where Tsonga people live in the Makhado area. However, his paramountancy as chief of all Vatsonga in the Makhado area was highly contested by João Albasini, who declared himself chief of all Vatsonga people in the Makhado area. The paramount chieftainship was lost in 1930 upon the death of Hosinkulu Njhakanjhaka at waterval Shirley farm, after the death of the great Njhakanjhaka, the whole village of Elim was run and managed by the Swiss Mission Church, known today as Evangelical Presbyterian Church in South Africa (EPCSA). The Swiss missionaries at Elim were responsible for the disappearance of Njhakanjhaka paramount chieftainship since they are the ones that decided that Elim, as a 'Capital' site of the Swiss Mission Church in South Africa, should be run and managed by the Church, as a result, no new chief of the Njhakanjhaka clan was appointed after 1930. The Swiss Mission Church in South Africa was later, during the 1960s, to play a positive role and to the benefit of the Njhakanjhaka chieftainship since they actively opposed the forced removal of the Elim Shirley Community. Between 1930 up until 1995, the Njhakanjhaka chieftainship disappeared from the scene, it was only restored in 1995 by President Nelson Mandela. However, the status of Njhakanjhaka as a paramount chief was not restored, he was only recognised as a senior chief.

However, during the 1960s, the apartheid government gave some form of recognition to the Njhakanjhaka chieftainship, the incumbent was given a status of an independent headman without a chief, but a tribal office was not granted until 1995. The land of Hosinkulu Njhakanjhaka was greatly reduced in size, only the villages of Elim, Lemana, Shirley, Waterval, Magangeni, eka-Mabobo and Njhakanjhaka were left for him to exercise his authority.

Hosi Malele

The fate that befell hosi Malele and his Wayeni community during the 1960s was rather regrettable. His land was reduced into a small village and his seniority taken away, he was given to Hosi Bungeni as his headman. Malele' land was big and he occupied the rolling hills southeast of Elim known to the apartheid government as "Bellevue". Hosi Malele was an independent senior chief with a big land like hosi Bokisi. Today, he is trying to reassert his autonomy by refusing to participate in the Bungeni tribal authority since originally he never reported nor fell under Hosi Bungeni.

Hosi Mahatlani Sibisi

Just like hosi Malele of Wayeni, hosi Mahatlani's land became a dumping ground for all communities that were removed from their land by the apartheid government and dumped on his land. The village of Ribungwani and Masakona have taken land that previously fell under hosi Mahatlani's jurisdiction. In 1960, hosi Mahatlani was de-recognised by the apartheid government and handed over to Hosi Bungeni as his Induna. Today, hosi Mahatlani is considered a rebel at Bungeni village because he is refusing to participate in the Bungeni tribal authority as an induna. Just like hosi Mtsetweni, his chieftainship is currently being investigated by the kgatla commission.

Hosi Skhunyani

The land on the hill east of Nwanancila river known today as Skhosana village (under headman Nwaxinyamani) up until the eastern side of Rivolwa mountain and the village of Bodwe is the land of Headman Skhunyani and his people. They were expelled in 1960 and dumped at a village known today as Bungeni new stands. Headman Skhunyani, along with headman Nwaxinyamani, are the original headmen of Hosi Bungeni and fell under the jurisdiction of Hosi Bungeni from the time they took up the land some centuries ago. Consequently, Skhunyani, known today as Skhosana, is the original land of Hosi Bungeni.

== Gazankulu today ==
Gazankulu, as a political entity, no longer exists, it is today part of Limpopo and Mpumalanga provinces. In 1994, Gazankulu was sub-divided into different municipalities cross-cutting linguistic and cultural boundaries, a feature of a new democratic South Africa. The western district of former Hlanganani was allocated to Makhado Local Municipality (130 000 people), the southern part of Hlanganani was divided and allocated to Greater Letaba Local Municipality (5 000 people), while the eastern part of Hlanganani was allocated to Greater Giyani Local Municipality (35 000 people). In total, Hlanganani district lost 40 000 people to both the Greater Giyani and Greater Letaba local Municipalities in 1994, while Makhado local municipality was the biggest beneficiary of the former Hlanganani district, it took more than 130 000 people from the former Hlanganani in 1994 when the district was broken-up. The Greater Giyani Local Municipality was merged with some parts of Bolobedu (Northern Sotho speaking), Malamulele was merged with Thulamela Local Municipality and Lulekani was merged with Namakgale to form a new Municipality with Phalaborwa known as Ba-Phalaborwa Local Municipality. Shiluvane, under Hosi Muhlaba and other Tsonga areas in Ritavi has been merged to form Greater Tzaneen Local Municipality. In Bushbuckridge, the whole area has been merged with Northern Sotho and the Swazi to form Bushbuckridge Local Municipality.

The population of the former Gazankulu, according to the 2011 census, is spread out as follows; Limpopo 1.1 million or 17% of the province, Mpumalanga 500,000 or 11.5% of the province and Gauteng 800,000 or 4% of the province. With the total population in 2011 being 2.3 million or 5% of South Africa's total population.

== Districts in 1991 ==
Districts of the homeland and population in the 1991 census.

- Mhala: 253,297
- Ritavi: 143,702
- Giyani: 212,226
- Malamulele: 179,326
- Lulekani: 38,770
- Hlanganani: 127,450

== See also ==
- List of chief ministers of Gazankulu
