= Mutale Local Municipality =

Coordinates: 22°35′S 30°40′E

Mutale
- Local municipality
- Seal

- Location in Limpopo
- Country: South Africa
- Province: Limpopo
- District: Vhembe
- Seat: Mutale
- Wards: 13

Government
  - Type: Municipal council
  - Mayor: Tshitereke Matibe

Area
  - Total: 3,886 km^{2} (1,500 sq mi)

Population (2011)
  - Total: 91,870
  - Density: 23.64/km^{2} (61.23/sq mi)

Racial makeup (2011)
  - Black African: 99.3%
  - Coloured: 0.1%
  - Indian/Asian: 0.1%
  - White: 0.5%

First languages (2011)
  - Venda: 96.8%
  - Other: 3.2%
- Time zone: UTC+2 (SAST)
- Municipal code: LIM342

Mutale Local Municipality was a municipality located in the Vhembe District Municipality of Limpopo province, South Africa. The seat of Mutale Local Municipality was Mutale. It is now part of Thulamela and Musina Local Municipalities.

== Main places ==
The 2001 census divided the municipality into the following main places:

Place	Code	Area (km^{2})	Population	Most spoken language
Makuya	90601	469.38	5,948	Venda
Manenzhe	90602	124.94	3,902	Venda
Moletele	90603	140.96	2,229	Venda
Mphaphuli	90604	1.83	449	Venda
Rambuda	90605	600.92	27,610	Venda
Thengwe	90606	282.71	24,812	Venda
Tshikondeni Mine	90607	0.95	512	Afrikaans
Tshikundamalema	90608	667.80	13,471	Venda

== Politics ==
The municipal council consisted of twenty-six members elected by mixed-member proportional representation. Thirteen councillors were elected by first-past-the-post voting in thirteen wards, while the remaining thirteen were chosen from party lists so that the total number of party representatives was proportional to the number of votes received. In the election of 18 May 2011 the African National Congress (ANC) won a majority of twenty-three seats on the council. The following table shows the results of the election.

Party	Votes				Seats		
Party	Ward	List	Total	%	Ward	List	Total
ANC	19,826	20,254	40,080	86.2	13	10	23
DA	953	1,122	2,075	4.5	0	1	1
COPE	355	750	1,105	2.4	0	1	1
PAC	514	396	910	1.9	0	1	1
AZAPO	450	381	831	1.8	0	0	0
Independent	823	–	823	1.8	0	–	0
ACDP	346	333	679	1.5	0	0	0
Total	23,267	23,236	46,503	100.0	13	13	26
Spoilt votes	274	226	500				
