= Tshikota =

- Location within Limpopo Location within South Africa
- Coordinates: 23.051°S 29.869°E
- Country: South Africa
- Province: Limpopo
- District: Vhembe
- Municipality: Makhado

Area
  - Total: 2.37 km^{2} (0.92 sq mi)

Population (2011)
  - Total: 7,492
  - Density: 3,160/km^{2} (8,190/sq mi)

Racial makeup (2011)
  - Black African: 98.5%
  - Coloured: 1.3%
  - Indian/Asian: 0.1%
  - White: 0.1%
  - Other: 0.1%

First languages (2011)
  - Venda: 54.6%
  - Northern Sotho: 13.3%
  - Tsonga: 6.8%
  - Sotho: 5.4%
  - Other: 19.9%
- Time zone: UTC+2 (SAST)

Tshikota is a township just west outside Louis Trichardt in Vhembe District Municipality in the Limpopo province of South Africa.
