= Ga-Maphalle Village =

Ga-Maphalle (also known as Pipa) is a village situated along the R81 road between Mooketsi and Giyani towns in Bolobedu area. It is one of the villages under the reign of Her Royal Highness Queen Modjadji revered for her alleged ability to bring down rain.

The village is famous for its fruit & vegetable market, situated in the village's business area. The market serves as a bus stop for long-distance buses and taxis.

== Culture & beliefs ==
=== Khikhapa ===
Khikhapa is a traditional singing and dancing performed by Balobedu women. Fully dressed in Khilobedu attire, the dancers form a circle around the drummers. The dancing happens during specific village occasions and normally attracts large crowds of spectators from around the village.

=== Dinaka ===
Dinaka is a musical composition performed by elderly men. With wooden flutes and hypes and drums, they come together during occasions - usually this would be concurrent with Khikhapa dancing - and compose different cultural songs.

=== Khilaphatha ===
Khilaphatha was Botha dance and a ritual. The ritual was performed by elderly men (even women), who would gather around village water reservoirs - usually dams half naked to sing and dance to welcome seasonal rains. It is believed that the ritual itself was able to bring down rain. Khilaphatha has long been discontinued with the advent of stands.

== Demographics ==
There are three main spoken languages: Khilobedu, Xitsonga and Tshivenda. Khilobedu form the larger part of the population (about 80%), followed by Xitsonga speaking people with about 18% and the Tshivenda speaking group taking the remaining 2%.

== Public facilities ==
Clinic

The clinic is situated in business area along the R81 road. It is open 24/7.

Library

The library is built near the chief's headquarters (Khorone), also closer to the main road.

== Schools ==
Pipa Primary School

The oldest school in the village and the prestigious primary school in its circuit, Pipa is situated opposite the market along the R81 road. Mr. S Makgalo is the current principal.

Modisha Secondary School

Modisha was established in 1990 to cater for three villages, namely: Maphalle (under the leadership of chief Modika), Ditshosine and Shawela. The name was coined using the first two letters of Modika, Ditshosing and Shawela.

Both schools have adopted Sepedi as their home language. This is due to the fact that, despite the major differences between the two languages and the massive number of people who speak Khilobedu, the language was left out in 1996 when languages were recognized as official languages of South Africa.

== Recreational ==
There are two popular recreational facilities in the village.

Tshepisho Pools

Tshepisho Pools is situated closer to the R81 road, the village clinic and the market.

Gwegwes Resort

Gwegwe resort lies between ga-Maphalle and Blinkwater village.

== Sections ==
The village is subdivided into four major sections namely: Nkwelemotse, Polantane, Nyakelane, Nanedi and sethabaneng

== History ==
The village came about as a result of the movement of people at the time when black people were forced to vacate their lands to be grouped in Bantu stands in the late 60's (between 1965 and 1969).

Formally known as Pipa village, there are varying versions of how it came to be known as ga-Maphalle village. All the versions are linked with a known family by the same surname who were the first to live closer to the R81 road. As a result, recounts the popular version, the family was used as a reference for public transport users. The name was later registered as the official name of the village instead of Pipa.
