= Middle Letaba Dam =

- Interactive map of Middle Letaba Dam
- Official name: Middle Letaba Dam
- Location: Limpopo, South Africa
- Coordinates: 23°16′0″S 30°24′1″E
- Opening date: 1984
- Operators: Department of Water Affairs and Forestry

Dam and spillways
- Type of dam: earth-fill
- Impounds: Middle Letaba River
- Height: 38 metres (125 ft)
- Length: 2,600 metres (8,500 ft)

Reservoir
- Creates: Middle Letaba Dam Reservoir
- Total capacity: 173,128,000 cubic metres (6.1140×10^{9} cu ft)
- Surface area: 1,878.7 hectares (4,642 acres)

Middle Letaba Dam is an earth-fill type dam located on the Middle Letaba River, 40 km east of Elim and 40 km west of Giyani, Limpopo, South Africa. The source of the Middle Letaba river rises high in the tropical mountains of Magoebaskloof near Tzaneen, where rainfall is abundant during the summer months. The river passes numerous villages and its flow becomes quite strong when it reaches the village of Magoro.

Once at full capacity, the Middle Letaba becomes Limpopo's third largest dam, but the Middle Letaba Dam only reaches its full capacity when the river is in flood. The dam rarely reaches its full capacity because the engineers overestimated the yield of the river feeding the dam. The error in the assessment also resulted in water shortages for competing water users.

Construction of the dam started in 1980 under Gazankulu government and serves mainly for water supply to Giyani and Hlanganani. The dam is situated alongside the R578 road to Giyani and Elim. The hazard potential of the dam has been ranked high (3). The dam is popularly known as 'Sterkrivier Dam' by the local people, the name Sterkrivier (Strong river) was given by the Afrikaner people. Before the construction of the dam in 1980, the water which used to flow in this river was so powerful to an extent that a new name was given to the river, hence 'Sterkrivier'.

== See also ==
- List of reservoirs and dams in South Africa
- List of rivers of South Africa
