= R578 (South Africa) =

Regional route in South Africa

Regional route R578

Route information
- Length: 90.3 km (56.1 mi)

Major junctions
- From: N1 near Louis Trichardt
- To: R81 near Giyani

Location
- Country: South Africa

Highway system
- Numbered routes of South Africa
← R577	→ R579

The R578 is a Regional Route in South Africa that connects Louis Trichardt with Giyani via Waterval and Bungeni.

== History ==
The construction of the large section of the road, from Elim to Giyani (84 km of the road) was surveyed, planned and constructed by the former Gazankulu Government in 1987. The R578 runs through the Tsonga homeland of former Gazankulu, in particular, it runs through Hlanganani and Giyani.The following villages, which are large and densely populated, are found alongside the R578 road; Elim, Njhakanjhaka, Rivoni, Waterval, Shirley, Mbhokota, Bokisi, Chavani, Nwaxinyamani, Bungeni, Nkuzana, Majosi, Nwamatatana, Khomanani, Ntshuxi, the Middle Letaba Dam, Babangu, Ndengeza C, Nhlaneki, Mapuve, Maswanganyi, Bode, Dzingidzingi and Giyani. Elim Hospital, Hubyeni Shopping Centre, Nkuna Kraal Mall and Elim Mall are all situated alongside the R578 road.

== Route ==
Its western terminus is the N1 just south of Louis Trichardt. It heads east-south-east, through the township of Waterval at Elim to end at Giyani at an intersection with the R81.
