= Laatsgevonden =

- Location within Limpopo Location within South Africa
- Coordinates: 23.068°S 30.317°E
- Country: South Africa
- Province: Limpopo
- District: Vhembe
- Municipality: Makhado

Area
  - Total: 2.37 km^{2} (0.92 sq mi)

Population (2001)
  - Total: 1,228
  - Density: 518/km^{2} (1,340/sq mi)
- Time zone: UTC+2 (SAST)

Laatsgevonden is a town in Makhado Local Municipality in the Limpopo province of South Africa.
