= Madombidzha =

Township west of Louis Trichardt, Limpopo, South Africa

Coordinates: 23°7′0″S 29°49′0″E

Madombidzha is a township west of Louis Trichardt under the Makhado Local Municipality of the Vhembe District Municipality in the Limpopo province of South Africa.
