= R81 (South Africa) =

Provincial route in South Africa

Provincial route R81

Route information
- Maintained by SANRAL and RAL
- Length: 193 km (120 mi)

Major junctions
- Southwest end: R71 / N1 in Polokwane
- R36 near Modjadjiskloof R578 at Giyani R529 at Giyani
- Northeast end: R524 at Nyavani

Location
- Country: South Africa
- Major cities: Polokwane, Giyani, Malamulele

Highway system
- Numbered routes of South Africa
← R80	→ R82

The R81 is a provincial route in Limpopo, South Africa that connects Polokwane with the R524 at Nyavani via Giyani.

== Route ==
Detailed Route

The R81 starts at a junction with the R71 road in Polokwane (capital of the Limpopo Province), in the suburb of Fauna Park (just east of the town centre). It heads north-east as Munnik Avenue to form an interchange with the Polokwane Eastern Bypass (N1 national route) adjacent to the Mall of the North in Bendor Park before exiting the city.

From the N1 interchange, the R81 heads north-east for 71 kilometres, bypassing Sebayeng, to reach a junction with the R36 road north-west of Modjadjiskloof. The R36 joins the R81 and they are one road eastwards for 1.5 kilometres before the R81 becomes the road north-east at Mooketsi.

From the junction with the R36 at Mooketsi, the R81 goes north-east for 70 kilometres to enter the town of Giyani. It meets the eastern terminus of the R578 road and the northern terminus of the R529 road before turning northwards to cross the Klein Letaba River into the town centre of Giyani.

From Giyani, the R81 goes north for 47 kilometres, through Malamulele, to end at a junction with the R524 road at Nyavani.
