= Bvuma Primary School =

School in Limpopo, South Africa

Coordinates: 23.5553°S 30.80948°E

Bvuma Primary School is a public school located in Loloka, Limpopo, South Africa provides free primary education for pupils in Loloka and surrounding areas.

The school was founded in 1973 during the rule of Regent Chief Mbhalati Piet Mabunda a.k.a. Mzuzwani whose tenure saw the establishment of many schools in the Ka-Dzumeri Ka-Dzumeri area. The Chief would mobilize villages under his rule to contribute equally to the establishment of schools. Magwaza Mabunda was the first principal, succeeded by Mnisi MM, then current principal is Ntlemo MR.

The school's motto is "Strive for success."

Classes at the school are taught in Xitsonga and include such topics as computer studies, in which pupils learn to use computers. The school also has a football team. The school has produced some of the first well known Computer scientist Arthur Milondzo.
