= Musina Local Municipality elections =

The Musina Local Municipality is a Local Municipality in Limpopo, South Africa. The council consists of twenty-four members elected by mixed-member proportional representation. Twelve councillors are elected by first-past-the-post voting in twelve wards, while the remaining twelve are chosen from party lists so that the total number of party representatives is proportional to the number of votes received. In the election of 1 November 2021 the African National Congress (ANC) won a majority of 19 seats.

== Results ==
The following table shows the composition of the council after past elections.

Event	ACDP	ANC	DA	EFF	Other	Total
2000 election	—	7	1	—	1	9
2006 election	1	9	1	—	0	11
2011 election	1	9	—	—	2	12
2016 election	0	18	3	3	0	24
2021 election	0	19	2	2	1	24

== December 2000 election ==
The following table shows the results of the 2000 election.

Party	Ward			List			Total seats
Party	Votes	%	Seats	Votes	%	Seats	Total seats
African National Congress	4,040	79.79	4	4,072	79.28	3	7
Democratic Alliance	637	12.58	0	1,064	20.72	1	1
Independent candidates	386	7.62	1				1
Total	5,063	100.00	5	5,136	100.00	4	9
Valid votes	5,063	95.98		5,136	96.94		
Invalid/blank votes	212	4.02		162	3.06		
Total votes	5,275	100.00		5,298	100.00		
Registered voters/turnout	14,058	37.52		14,058	37.69		

== March 2006 election ==
The following table shows the results of the 2006 election.

Party	Ward			List			Total seats
Party	Votes	%	Seats	Votes	%	Seats	Total seats
African National Congress	5,517	75.52	6	5,529	76.06	3	9
Democratic Alliance	844	11.55	0	935	12.86	1	1
African Christian Democratic Party	389	5.33	0	384	5.28	1	1
Pan Africanist Congress of Azania	272	3.72	0	236	3.25	0	0
United Democratic Movement	100	1.37	0	91	1.25	0	0
Independent candidates	108	1.48	0				0
Ximoko Party	54	0.74	0	45	0.62	0	0
Azanian People's Organisation	21	0.29	0	49	0.67	0	0
Total	7,305	100.00	6	7,269	100.00	5	11
Valid votes	7,305	97.58		7,269	97.11		
Invalid/blank votes	181	2.42		216	2.89		
Total votes	7,486	100.00		7,485	100.00		
Registered voters/turnout	18,059	41.45		18,059	41.45		

== May 2011 election ==
The following table shows the results of the 2011 election.

Party	Ward			List			Total seats
Party	Votes	%	Seats	Votes	%	Seats	Total seats
African National Congress	7,748	76.40	6	7,839	76.98	3	9
African Christian Democratic Party	1,080	10.65	0	1,337	13.13	1	1
Congress of the People	532	5.25	0	567	5.57	1	1
Pan Africanist Congress of Azania	453	4.47	0	440	4.32	1	1
Independent candidates	329	3.24	0				0
Total	10,142	100.00	6	10,183	100.00	6	12
Valid votes	10,142	97.92		10,183	98.32		
Invalid/blank votes	215	2.08		174	1.68		
Total votes	10,357	100.00		10,357	100.00		
Registered voters/turnout	20,328	50.95		20,328	50.95		

== August 2016 election ==
The following table shows the results of the 2016 election.

Party	Ward			List			Total seats
Party	Votes	%	Seats	Votes	%	Seats	Total seats
African National Congress	17,603	74.62	12	17,506	74.29	6	18
Democratic Alliance	3,073	13.03	0	3,030	12.86	3	3
Economic Freedom Fighters	2,291	9.71	0	2,322	9.85	3	3
Congress of the People	200	0.85	0	256	1.09	0	0
Musina Mutale Unified Front	148	0.63	0	134	0.57	0	0
Pan Africanist Congress of Azania	97	0.41	0	107	0.45	0	0
African Christian Democratic Party	68	0.29	0	89	0.38	0	0
South African United Party	58	0.25	0	51	0.22	0	0
People's Revolutionary Movement	46	0.19	0	54	0.23	0	0
Leadership Forum	6	0.03	0	15	0.06	0	0
Total	23,590	100.00	12	23,564	100.00	12	24
Valid votes	23,590	99.05		23,564	98.85		
Invalid/blank votes	227	0.95		275	1.15		
Total votes	23,817	100.00		23,839	100.00		
Registered voters/turnout	43,282	55.03		43,282	55.08		

== November 2021 election ==
The following table shows the results of the 2021 election.

Party	Ward			List			Total seats
Party	Votes	%	Seats	Votes	%	Seats	Total seats
African National Congress	15,194	70.01	12	16,260	75.72	7	19
Economic Freedom Fighters	1,703	7.85	0	2,100	9.78	2	2
Democratic Alliance	1,594	7.34	0	2,101	9.78	2	2
Independent candidates	2,509	11.56	0				0
Freedom Front Plus	245	1.13	0	264	1.23	1	1
African People's Convention	129	0.59	0	198	0.92	0	0
Able Leadership	103	0.47	0	152	0.71	0	0
African Christian Democratic Party	79	0.36	0	140	0.65	0	0
Pan Africanist Congress of Azania	87	0.40	0	128	0.60	0	0
International Revelation Congress	60	0.28	0	132	0.61	0	0
Total	21,703	100.00	12	21,475	100.00	12	24
Valid votes	21,703	98.49		21,475	97.39		
Invalid/blank votes	333	1.51		575	2.61		
Total votes	22,036	100.00		22,050	100.00		
Registered voters/turnout	45,309	48.63		45,309	48.67		

=== By-elections (November 2021–present) ===
The following by-elections were held to fill vacant ward seats in the period from the election in November 2021.

Date	Ward	Party of the previous councillor	Party of the newly elected councillor
15 Oct 2025	2	African National Congress	African National Congress
