= Nyavani =

- Location within Limpopo Location within South Africa
- Coordinates: 22.905°S 30.750°E
- Country: South Africa
- Province: Limpopo
- District: Vhembe
- Municipality: Collins Chabane

Area
  - Total: 0.68 km^{2} (0.26 sq mi)

Population (2011)
  - Total: 305
  - Density: 450/km^{2} (1,200/sq mi)

Racial makeup (2011)
  - Black African: 99.7%
  - White: 0.3%

First languages (2011)
  - Venda: 58.5%
  - Tsonga: 38.2%
  - Other: 3.3%
- Time zone: UTC+2 (SAST)

Nyavani is a small village situated along the R524 route to Punda Maria in the Kruger National Park. The nearest towns from Nyavani are Malamulele to the south and Thohoyandou to the west. Nyavani falls under Collins Chabane Local Municipality. It borders the villages Tshikonelo to the north and Murhaga to the west.

The two dominant languages spoken in the area are Venda and Tsonga. There are two schools in Nyavani: Dlamani High School and Nyavani Primary School.
