= Levubu =

- Location within Limpopo Location within South Africa
- Coordinates: 23.085°S 30.284°E
- Country: South Africa
- Province: Limpopo
- District: Vhembe
- Municipality: Makhado

Area
  - Total: 0.41 km^{2} (0.16 sq mi)

Population (2011)
  - Total: 207
  - Density: 500/km^{2} (1,300/sq mi)

Racial makeup (2011)
  - Black African: 39.1%
  - Coloured: 2.9%
  - White: 58.0%

First languages (2011)
  - Afrikaans: 59.3%
  - Venda: 17.6%
  - Tsonga: 7.8%
  - Northern Sotho: 6.4%
  - Other: 8.8%
- Time zone: UTC+2 (SAST)
- Postal code (street): 0929
- PO box: 0929
- Area code: 015

Levubu is a village in the Makhado Local Municipality, part of the Vhembe District Municipality of Limpopo province, South Africa. It is located some 10 km south-west of Rembander. It takes its name from the Luvuvhu (or Levubu) River.
