= Mutale =

- Location within Limpopo Location within South Africa
- Coordinates: 22.737°S 30.526°E
- Country: South Africa
- Province: Limpopo
- District: Vhembe
- Municipality: Thulamela

Area
  - Total: 17.77 km^{2} (6.86 sq mi)

Population (2011)
  - Total: 14,490
  - Density: 815.4/km^{2} (2,112/sq mi)

Racial makeup (2011)
  - Black African: 99.8%
  - Other: 0.1%

First languages (2011)
  - Venda: 98.2%
  - Other: 1.8%
- Time zone: UTC+2 (SAST)
- Postal code (street): 0956
- PO box: 0956
- Area code: 015

Mutale is a main town in Vhembe District Municipality in the Limpopo province of South Africa.
