= R578 road =

R578 road may refer to:

- R578 road (Ireland)
- R578 road (South Africa)
