= R524 (South Africa) =

Regional route in South Africa

Regional route R524

Route information
- Length: 130 km (81 mi)

Major junctions
- West end: N1 at Louis Trichardt
- R523 at Thohoyandou; R81 at Nyavani
- East end: Punda Maria Gate of the Kruger National Park

Location
- Country: South Africa

Highway system
- Numbered routes of South Africa
← R523	→ R525

The R524 is a Regional Route in Limpopo, South Africa that connects Louis Trichardt with the Punda Maria Gate of the Kruger National Park via Thohoyandou and Nyavani.

== Route ==
The R524 begins at a junction with N1 national route at Louis Trichardt. From there, it runs eastwards for 65 kilometres to Thohoyandou, where it meets the eastern terminus of the R523. It then runs east for 31 kilometres to meet the northern terminus of the R81 at Nyavani. It then heads north-east for 34 kilometres to end at the Punda Maria Gate of the Kruger National Park.
