= Bungeni =

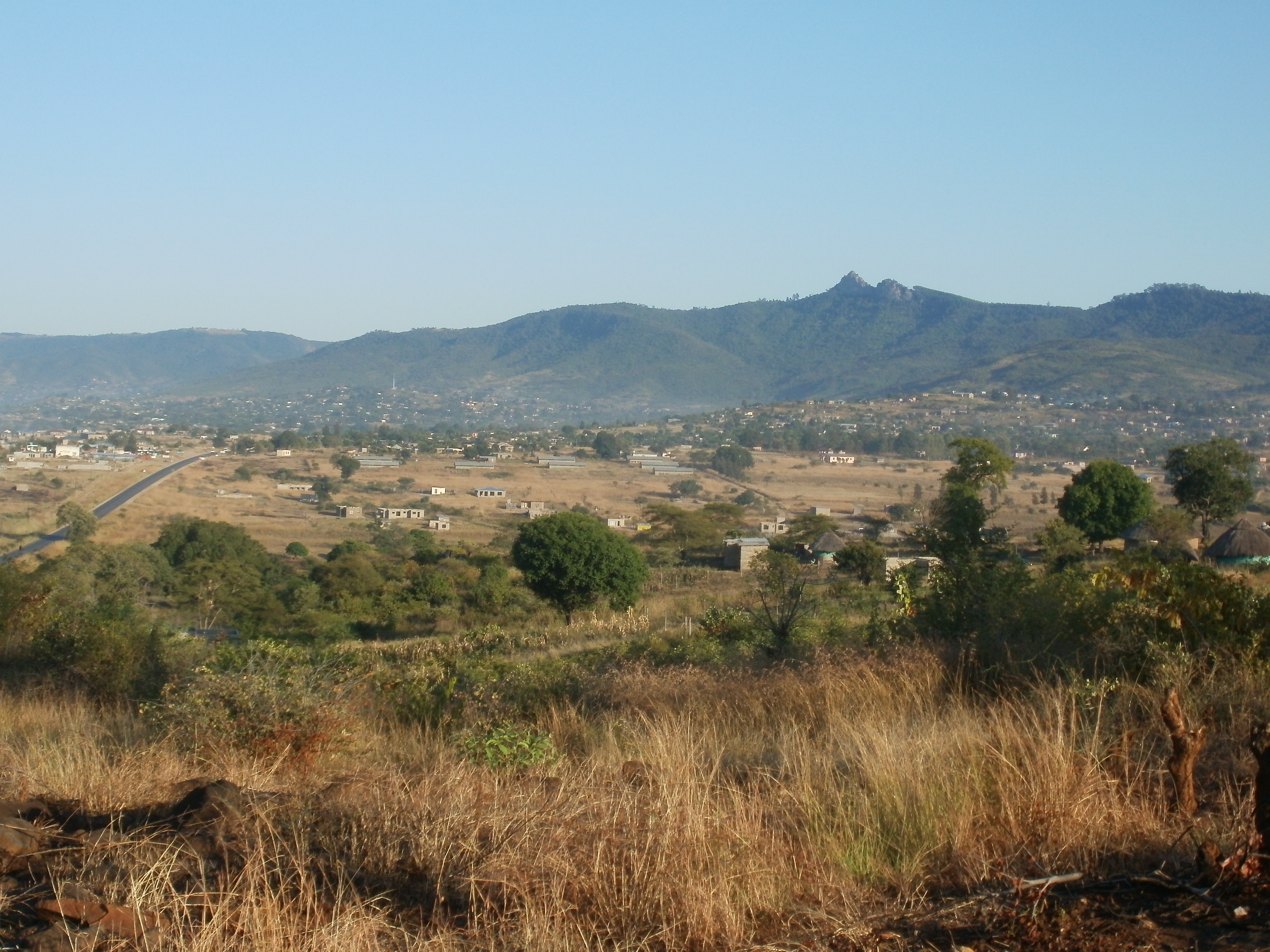
- A new village near Bungeni Big tree, Bungeni Village

- Location within Limpopo Location within South Africa
- Coordinates: 23.206°S 30.224°E
- Country: South Africa
- Province: Limpopo
- District: Vhembe
- Municipality: Makhado

Area
  - Total: 10.94 km^{2} (4.22 sq mi)
- Elevation: 700 m (2,300 ft)

Population (2011)
  - Total: 23 000
  - Density: 2.1/km^{2} (5.4/sq mi)

Racial makeup (2011)
  - Black African: 99.6%
  - Coloured: 0.2%
  - Indian/Asian: 0.1%
  - White: 0.1%
  - Other: 0.1%

First languages (2011)
  - Tsonga: 90.3%
  - Venda: 7.3%
  - Other: 2.5%
- Time zone: UTC+2 (SAST)
- Postal code (street): n/a
- PO box: n/a

Bungeni is a large sprawling rural settlement situated on top of one of the foothills and tail end of the Soutpansberg mountain in Louis Trichardt, Limpopo Province, South Africa. The Levubu agricultural plantation, where avocado, bananas, litchis, macadamia nuts, peaches and mangoes are grown in abundance is just 3 km away north of Bungeni village. It lies 35 km east of Makhado, with the R578 road (South Africa) passing through it. With more than 30 000 people, Bungeni is the largest Tsonga village in Makhado local municipality. In 1994 and in 2016, administrative control of this western portion of Gazankulu has been sub-divided in half and allocated to two Municipalities, first in 1994 to Makhado Local Municipality and in 2016, to the New Malamulele Municipality in the Vhembe district. As of April 2016, the Western portion, known as 'Bungeni West' by the locals, has remained in Makhado local municipality, while the eastern portion, known as 'Bungeni east', has been allocated to the new Malamulele Municipality.

== Sub-villages of Bungeni ==
Bungeni is a one Super village ruled by Hosi Bungeni, broken down into 22 sub-villages. Hosi Bungeni has jurisdiction over these 22 sub-villages, these sub-villages are run by or presided over by 21 headmen or 'tinduna', who reports directly to Hosi Bungeni. In total, there are more than 22 sub-villages within Bungeni, each with its own 'Nduna' or headman according to their seniority, they are as follows; (1) Sekhunyani (2) Bungeni xikhulu (3) Mabodhlongwa (4)Makhome (5) Xitaci (6) Mtsetweni (7)Xihambanyisi (8) Nwa-Mhandzi (9) Xivambu (10) Njhakanjhaka A (e-Gembani) (11) Njhakanjhaka B (eXavunyami) (12) Wayeni (Bellevue) (13) Mahatlani (14) Nghonyama (New Village, established in 2010) (15) WisaGalaza (16) Dumani (Wayeni) (17) Manyunyu (18) Xingowa (19) Tana na Pulani (New Village, established in 2005) (20) Mandela (New Village, established in 2000) (21) Mahatlani new Stands (New Village, established in 2009) (22) Bungeni Big Tree Village (New Village, established in 2012).

All these sub-villages are collectively known as 'eka-Bungeni' and they fall under Bungeni Traditional Authority, headquartered at Bungeni Xikhulu village, known to the locals as e-Tribal. About half of Bungeni Village is still empty land or unoccupied land, at full capacity, Bungeni village will be a home to more than 80 000 people by 2050. According to the 2015 mid-year population statistics, Bungeni has a population of approximately 30,000 people. The authority to demarcate residential stands, business sites and for any other purposes rest with Chief Bungeni (Mabunda).

== Nwaxinyamani village and the headman ==
In 1960, the South African Government refused to recognize Hosi Chavani Mukhari as a traditional leader for the people of Chavani, Bokisi, Mbhokota and Riverplaats on the basis that the combined people of Chavani, Mbhokota, Bokisi, Riverplaats and their land are too small and therefore they do not qualify for a Traditional Authority of their own. Hosi Chavani was a son of the great Hosinkulu Nhjakanhjaka of Elim/Shirley community whose land starts at Elim and share a border with Bungeni village at a western boundary of Nwaxinyamani village. Hosi Chavani was deployed by his father, Hosi Nhjakanhjaka, with the main aim of expanding the Nhjakanhjaka's area of jurisdiction so that it covers the whole area up until it join Hosi Bungeni's land to the west at Nwaxinyamani village. Initially, the land of Hosinkulu Nhjakanhjaka covers the whole town of Elim and spread beyond Shirley village and covers the whole area known today as Mbhokota, Bokisi, Chavani and Riverplaats. The colonial and later apartheid government feared and always discouraged the formation of large scale Tsonga kingdoms all over South Africa. Because the land of Hosinkulu Nhjakanhjaka was too large the apartheid government divided his land, one at Elim to be ruled by Hosinkulu Nhjakanhjaka and one at Chavani village to be ruled by Hosi Chavani, in that case, a large scale Tsonga kingdom was dealt a blow because the land was divided in order to avoid aggression by Tsongas because a large Tsonga kingdom could not easily be controlled by colonial authorities. The people of Chavani village and their leader, Hosi Chavani Mukhari, approached Hosi Russel Bungeni for assistance. They ask that Hosi Russel Bungeni give away some of his people and his land to the people of Chavani so that Hosi Chavani may be recognized by the South African Government as a Senior traditional leader. Hosi Russel Bungeni agreed to help Hosi Chavani, he gave away Nwaxinyamani village to Hosi Chavani, with strict conditions, that Nwaxinyamani village must be returned to Hosi Russel Bungeni after Hosi Chavani has been recognized by the Government as a Senior Chief. After the transfer of Nwaxinyamani village into Hosi Chavani's land, Nkhensani Tribal Authority became established, in around 1965/66 and the South African Government immediately recognized Hosi Chavani as a Senior Traditional leader for the newly established Nkhensani Tribal Authority, with Nwaxinyamani village as one of Hosi Chavani's land. Thereafter, Tribal Office and a Community Health Centre was built for the people of Chavani by the Government. In around 1968, after Hosi Chavani has been recognized as a Senior Chief by the Government, Nwaxinyamani village has to be returned to Hosi Russel Bungeni but that agreement was not respected by Hosi Chavani, who continued to ignored the 1960 agreement between Hosi Russel Bungeni and himself, i.e. to hand over Nwaxinyamani village back to Hosi Russel Bungeni. It was not until recently, between 2015 and 2017 that the new Hosi Bungeni, started to engaged the new Hosi Chavani about the 1960 agreement that was entered into by both chief's grandparents. At the moment, both Hosi Chavani and Hosi Bungeni have finally agreed that Nwaxinyamani village must be returned to its old Tribal authority. Negotiations are currently under way between Hosi Bungeni and his former headman, Nwaxinyamani, to finally incorporate Nwaxinyamani village back to Bungeni Tribal Authority.

== Education ==
Bungeni has 5 secondary schools, which are Russel Bungeni High School, Hluvuka High School, Marholeni Secondary School, Bellevue Secondary School and Mahatlani Secondary School. There are 12 primary schools at Bungeni. These are: Njhakanjhaka Primary, Muhluri Primary, Mkhono Higher Primary, Bungeni Primary, Xitaci Primary, Mtsetweni Primary, Xihambanyisi Primary, Ndlavheya Primary, Nwa-Mhandzi Primary, Wayeni Primary, Mahatlani Primary and Masungi Primary.
