= Gladwin Shitolo =

South African soccer player

Personal information
- Full name: Gladwin Shitolo
- Date of birth: 10 August 1989 (age 37)
- Place of birth: Giyani, South Africa
- Height: 1.79 m (5 ft 10 1/2 in)
- Positions: Defensive midfielder; centre-back; right-back

Team information
- Current team: Lamontville Golden Arrows
- Number: 5

Youth career
- 2006–2009: Jomo Cosmos

Senior career*
Years	Team	Apps	(Gls)
2009–2014	Jomo Cosmos	71	(0)
2014–2022	Orlando Pirates	27	(0)
2015	→ Platinum Stars (loan)	1	(0)
2015–2016	→ Lamontville Golden Arrows (loan)	28	(4)
2019	→ Chippa United (loan)	12	(0)
2019–2020	→ Lamontville Golden Arrows (loan)	24	(1)
2020–2021	→ Lamontville Golden Arrows (loan)	22	(0)
2022–	Lamontville Golden Arrows	72	(3)

International career^{‡}
2009	South Africa U20	2	(0)
- South Africa U23
2020–	South Africa	1	(0)
- * Club domestic league appearances and goals as of 4 January 2026 ‡ National team caps and goals as of 21:27, 13 November 2020 (UTC)

Gladwin Shitolo (born 10 August 1989) is a South African soccer player who plays as a defensive midfielder, centre-back or right-back for South African Premier Division side Lamontville Golden Arrows.

== Early life ==
Shitolo was born in Giyani.

== Club career ==
He started his career at Jomo Cosmos, joining the club at the age of 17 in 2006, before joining the first-team in 2009.

He signed for Orlando Pirates in summer 2014.

Shitolo spent the second half of the 2014–15 season on loan at Platinum Stars, before joining Lamontville Golden Arrows on loan for the 2015–16 season.

On 16 January 2019, he joined Chippa United on loan.

He again joined Lamontville Golden Arrows on loan in summer 2019.

In October 2020, he returned to Golden Arrows on a season-long loan.

== International career ==
Shitolo has represented South Africa at under-20 and under-23 levels, representing the former at the 2009 FIFA U-20 World Cup.

He was called up to the South Africa national team for the first time in 2013 for the COSAFA Cup, but did not feature.

He was again called up to the national side in 2020, but the fixtures were delayed due to the COVID-19 pandemic in South Africa. He made his international debut on 8 October 2020 in a 1–1 draw with Namibia.
