= Hlanganani, Limpopo =

Hlanganani Spelonken
- Location within Limpopo Location within South Africa
- Coordinates: 23.195°S 30.236°E
- Country: South Africa
- Province: Limpopo
- District: Vhembe
- Municipality: Collins Chabane

Area
  - Total: 9.07 km^{2} (3.50 sq mi)

Population (2011)
  - Total: 7,816
  - Density: 862/km^{2} (2,230/sq mi)

Racial makeup (2011)
  - Black African: 99.8%
  - Coloured: 0.1%

First languages (2011)
  - Tsonga: 81.4%
  - Venda: 16.0%
  - English: 1.1%
  - Other: 1.5%
- Time zone: UTC+2 (SAST)
- Postal code (street): n/a
- PO box: n/a

Hlanganani, also known as Spelonken, is an amalgamation of various large villages which are situated in the north western portion of the former Tsonga homeland of Gazankulu, South Africa. Hlanganani is situated alongside the R578 road to Giyani and Elim.

Hlanganani means Come together in Xitsonga. The following places are named after Hlanganani: The Hlanganani Regional Court in Waterval township next to Elim Hospital (built in 1983 by the Gazankulu homeland), the Hlanganani Cost Centre at Bungeni and Nkuzana villages (the Hlanganani Cost Centre houses the Department of Water Affairs and the Department of Public Works, before 1994 it was known as Hlanganani Regional Office Department of Works), the Hlanganani Police Station at Tiyani (Magoro), the Elim-Hlanganani old age home in Waterval township next to Elim Hospital, Hlanganani District Pension Office at Bungeni Village, the Hlanganani Taxi Association and the Hlanganani Community Radio.
