= List of chief ministers of Gazankulu =

The chief ministers of Gazankulu served during its period of self-rule from 1 February 1973 until its reintegration into South Africa on 27 April 1994. Hudson William Edison Ntsanwisi, who had served as chief executive councillor of Machangana since 1 July 1971, became chief minister when self-rule began and remained in office until 25 March 1993. He was succeeded by Edward Mhinga as acting chief minister and, in April 1993, by Samuel Dickenson Nxumalo, who remained in office until 26 April 1994. Ntsanwisi and Nxumalo were affiliated with the Ximoko Progressive Party (XPP).

== Leaders of Gazankulu ==
(Dates in italics indicate de facto continuation of office)

Tenure	Incumbent	Affiliation
Machangana
1 July 1971 to 1 February 1973	Hudson William Edison Ntsanwisi, Chief Executive Councillor
Gazankulu (Self-Rule)
1 February 1973 to 25 March 1993	Hudson William Edison Ntsanwisi, Chief Minister	XPP
25 March 1993 to April 1993	Edward Mhinga, acting Chief Minister
April 1993 to 26 April 1994	Samuel Dickenson Nxumalo, Chief Minister	XPP
Gazankulu re-integrated into South Africa on 27 April 1994

== Political affiliation ==
XPP – Ximoko Progressive Party

== See also ==
- Bantustan
- President of South Africa
- State President of South Africa
- List of prime ministers of South Africa
- Governor-General of the Union of South Africa
- Apartheid
- List of historical unrecognized states and dependencies
