= Hudson William Edison Ntsanwisi =

South African politician (1920–1993)

1st Chief Minister of Gazankulu
- In office 1 February 1973 – 25 March 1993
- Preceded by: Himself (as Chief Councillor of Vatsonga)
- Succeeded by: Edward Mhinga

Personal details
- Born: 11 July 1920 Tzaneen, Transvaal Province, South Africa
- Died: 23 March 1993 (aged 72) Johannesburg, Transvaal Province, South Africa
- Resting place: Heroes Arces, Old Parliamentary Complex, Giyani
- Party: Ximoko Progressive Party
- Spouse: Beatrice Nina Ntsanwisi nee. Ntloko
- Children: 4
- Education: Lemana College, University of Fort Hare, University of South Africa, Georgetown University
- Occupation: Teacher, Chief Inspector, Church Moderator, Professor, Chief Minister
- Profession: Teacher, Author, Politician
- Tribal Authority: Chief of the Majeje Tribal Authority

Hudson William Edison Ntsanwisi (11 July 1920 - 23 March 1993) was the first Chief Minister of Gazankulu, a former bantustan in apartheid-era South Africa.

== Biography ==
Ntsanwisi was the first of three children born to William and Evelyn Ntsanwisi on 11 July 1920 at Shiluvane Swiss Mission Station, 30 km south of Tzaneen, Transvaal Province of South Africa. Hudson Ntsanwisi had a meritorious school career. He attended the Shiluvane Primary School where he passed the Higher Primary Standard VI Examination in 1935, being placed first in the Transvaal Province, he taught at Emmarentia Geldenhuys High School in Warmbaths, now known as Bela-Bela and then enrolled at the University of Fort Hare to finish his final year doing a BA degree. He later enrolled at the University of South Africa, where he obtained a master's degree in African studies in 1965. He then went on to attend Georgetown University in the United States, where he studied linguistics.

After graduating from the University of Fort Hare, he founded Shiluvane Secondary School in 1949. In 1960 he was seconded to the University of the North, where he was attached to the Department of African Languages. He later served as dean of students.

He was the first African layman to hold the position of moderator of the Tsonga Presbyterian Church, now known as the Evangelical Presbyterian Church in South Africa -an office he held for a period of 12 years. During this period he attended international church conferences in Africa and overseas as a delegate of the church.

Ntsanwisi was also a prolific writer in his subject. He published a novel "Masungi" in Xitsonga, and a series of Tsonga Readers for Primary Schools, Makomba Ndlela. He was the first African author to write such a series. He also published one scientific work in Linguistics entitled "A Descriptive Study of the Idiom in Tsonga".

After returning to South Africa, he worked as a teacher, and later as a school inspector in 1956 in the northern Transvaal Province. He became the first Chief Minister of Vatsonga-Machangana Territorial Authority (which was later renamed Gazankulu) in 1969. He served as Chief Minister until his death in 1993. In 1979, the Legislative Assembly in recognition of his dedicated, distinguished and devoted service, conferred on him the Chieftainship of Majeje which he finally accepted in 1985. In 1980, the degree of Doctor of Administration(Honoris Causa) was conferred on him by the University of the North in recognition of his contribution to education and nation building.

Ntsanwisi was an offspring of the Maluleke Royal House. He was a great-grandson of Majeje, the son of the great Chieftain Maxakadzi of the Maluleke clan.

Ntsanwisi was a supporter of South African President F.W. de Klerk and Nelson Mandela, and their reforms which ultimately led to the end of apartheid in 1994.

=== Ximoko ===
Ntsanwisi founded the Ximoko cultural organisation in 1984, which became a political party in 1990.
