= Middle Letaba River =

River in South Africa

Coordinates: 23°15′S 30°27′E

The Middle Letaba River (commonly spelled Middel) is a tributary of the Klein Letaba River, situated in Limpopo, South Africa.

It is one of three rivers (alongside the Koedoes and Brandboontjies Rivers) that flow into the reservoir of the Middle Letaba Dam. A 2025 investigation found that illegal obstructions and diversions are sapping the river's flow.

== See also ==
- List of reservoirs and dams in South Africa
