= Wiseman Maluleke =

South African soccer player

Personal information
- Date of birth: 13 January 1992 (age 34)
- Position: Midfielder

Senior career*
Years	Team	Apps	(Gls)
2012–2014	Witbank Spurs	45	(4)
2014–2017	Jomo Cosmos	65	(7)
2014–2017	Polokwane City	33	(1)
2020–2023	Black Leopards	63	(0)
- * Club domestic league appearances and goals as of 16 August 2024

Wiseman Maluleke (born 13 January 1992) is a South African soccer player who played as a midfielder for three different clubs in the South African Premier Division.

He was born in Giyani. Following two years in Witbank Spurs he joined Jomo Cosmos in 2014. In June 2015, he scored the goal that secured Jomo Cosmos a 1–0 victory against Moroka Swallows and subsequent promotion from the 2014–15 National First Division. Maluleke made his first-tier debut in the 2015-16 South African Premier Division.

Maluleke secured a move back to the Premier Division when he signed with Polokwane City in 2017. Following three years in Polokwane City, his contract expired and he joined Black Leopards for free.

Black Leopards were relegated in 2021, but Maluleke opted to stay with the team. Black Leopards were relegated again in 2023, this time to the third tier, but solved that by buying the First Division licence of All Stars. Wiseman Maluleke was however released after Spanish manager Alejandro Dorado arrived at the club.
