= Samuel Dickenson Nxumalo =

South African politician (1926–2015)

3rd Chief Minister of Gazankulu
- In office 1 April 1993 – 26 April 1994
- Preceded by: Edward Mhinga
- Succeeded by: None

Personal details
- Died: 7 March 2015 Magona, Limpopo, South Africa

Samuel Dickenson Nxumalo (1926 – 7 March 2015) was the third and last Chief Minister of Gazankulu, a former bantustan in apartheid-era South Africa. He served as Chief Minister from 1 April 1993 to 26 April 1994, when the bantustan was re-integrated into Transvaal.

== Early life ==
Nxumalo was born at Gijana Village in 1926. He was born into a junior house of the Ndwandwe clan, direct descendants of warrior king NGHUNGHUNYANI (Gungunhana), the last lion of Gaza.
