= Edward Mhinga =

South African politician (1927–2017)

2nd Chief Minister of Gazankulu
- In office 25 March 1993 – 1 April 1993
- Preceded by: Hudson Ntsanwisi
- Succeeded by: Samuel Nxumalo

Edward Percy Mhinga (5 December 1927 – 2 September 2017) was the second Chief Minister of Gazankulu, a former bantustan in apartheid-era South Africa.

Edward Mhinga is a direct descendant of a Tsonga king by the name of Gunyule who gave rise to many tribes within the Vatsonga group such as the Maluleke, Bila, Matola, Makwakwa, Mondlane, Masangu, Mkhwanazi, Shivambu and a lot more others. The land on which Gazankulu was founded was actually inhabited by the Mhinga Dynasty all the way through the Pafuri area of Kruger National Park and some southern parts of Mozambique.
