= Makhado Local Municipality =

Coordinates: 23°0′S 29°45′E

Makhado
- Local municipality
- Seal

- Location in Limpopo
- Country: South Africa
- Province: Limpopo
- District: Vhembe
- Seat: Louis Trichardt
- Wards: 38

Government
  - Type: Municipal council
  - Mayor: Samuel Munyai

Area
  - Total: 8,300 km^{2} (3,200 sq mi)

Population (2011)
  - Total: 516,031
  - Density: 62/km^{2} (160/sq mi)

Racial makeup (2011)
  - Black African: 97.3%
  - Coloured: 0.2%
  - Indian/Asian: 0.4%
  - White: 2.0%

First languages (2011)
  - Venda: 68.1%
  - Tsonga: 22.1%
  - Northern Sotho: 2.6%
  - Afrikaans: 2.2%
  - Other: 5%
- Time zone: UTC+2 (SAST)
- Municipal code: LIM344

Makhado Municipality (Venda: Masipalawapo wa Makhado; Tsonga: Masipala wa Makhado) is a local municipality within the Vhembe District Municipality, in the Limpopo province of South Africa. The seat is Louis Trichardt. It is named in honour of 19th-century King (Thovhele) in the Singo (or Vhasenzi) dynasty of the Vendas, Makhado (1839-1895).

== Main places ==
The 2001 census divided the municipality into the following main places: The population census is just an estimate, there are close to 1-million Tsonga speakers in Gauteng alone, as well as close to 300 000 Venda speakers, also in Gauteng, who are there for work purposes only and have their homes in Limpopo; both the Tsonga and the Venda population are larger should the census count be done during December holiday.

Place	Code	Area (km^{2})	Population	Most spoken language
Bungeni	90801	20.67	18,192	Tsonga
Davhana	90802	60.93	6,361	Venda
Dzanani	90803	650.70	75,746	Venda
Funyufunyu	90804	2.86	3,580	Venda
Hlanganani	90805	181.14	11,156	Tsonga
Khomanani	90806	17.45	14,337	Tsonga
Kutama	90807	150.44	24,688	Venda
Louis Trichardt	90808	21.18	11,014	English, Venda, Tsonga
Madombidzha	90809	0.39	806	Venda
Madzivhandila	90810	9.77	13,051	Venda
Maelula	90811	2.80	5,652	Venda
Magadani	90812	1.59	1,875	Venda
Makushu	90814	0.69	1,207	Venda
Masakona	90815	73.39	7,033	Venda
Mashamba	90816	89.76	13,898	Venda
Mashau	90817	71.04	24,794	Venda
Masia	90818	120.31	8,689	Venda
Mkhensani	90819	12.68	16,210	Tsonga
Mudimeli	90820	1.82	3,055	Venda
Muila	90821	5.63	5,006	Northern Sotho
Mukhari	90822	24.49	20,007	Tsonga
Mulambilu	90823	2.78	3,307	Venda
Mulima	90824	288.99	17,245	Venda
Ndouvhada	90825	1.66	1,427	Venda
Nesengani	90826	7.89	12,235	Venda
Nthabalala	90827	161.96	15,665	Venda
Rabali	90828	6.20	8,701	Venda
Ramalamula	90829	36.48	5,924	Venda
Ribungwani	90830	4.93	3,071	Tsonga
Rungulani	90831	6.05	7,043	Tsonga
Sinthumule	90832	72.28	47,472	Venda
Soutpansberg	90833	18.81	7,512	Tsonga
Tiyani	90834	11.75	11,620	Tsonga
Tshikota	90835	42.88	4,099	Venda
Tshimbupfe	90836	107.89	17,538	Venda
Tshiovhe	90837	3.93	2,770	Venda
Vuwani	90838	13.58	19,770	Venda
Remainder of the municipality	90813	6,262.90	25,319	Tsonga

== Politics ==
The municipal council consists of seventy-five members elected by mixed-member proportional representation. Thirty-eight councillors are elected by first-past-the-post voting in thirty-eight wards, while the remaining thirty-seven are chosen from party lists so that the total number of party representatives is proportional to the number of votes received. In the election of 1 November 2021 the African National Congress (ANC) won a majority of sixty-two seats on the council. The following table shows the results of the election.

Party	Ward			List			Total seats
Party	Votes	%	Seats	Votes	%	Seats	Total seats
African National Congress	59,568	78.18	37	61,703	81.55	25	62
Democratic Alliance	5,293	6.95	1	5,260	6.95	4	5
Economic Freedom Fighters	4,168	5.47	0	4,515	5.97	4	4
Independent candidates	3,836	5.03	0				0
International Revelation Congress	664	0.87	0	805	1.06	1	1
Freedom Front Plus	675	0.89	0	669	0.88	1	1
African Christian Democratic Party	540	0.71	0	614	0.81	1	1
African People's Convention	437	0.57	0	462	0.61	1	1
9 other parties	1,014	1.33	0	1,631	2.16	0	0
Total	76,195	100.00	38	75,659	100.00	37	75
Valid votes	76,195	98.73		75,659	98.35		
Invalid/blank votes	979	1.27		1,266	1.65		
Total votes	77,174	100.00		76,925	100.00		
Registered voters/turnout	180,288	42.81		180,288	42.67		
