= Musina Local Municipality =

Coordinates: 22°25′S 29°45′E

Musina
- Local municipality
- Seal

- Location in Limpopo
- Country: South Africa
- Province: Limpopo
- District: Vhembe
- Seat: Musina
- Wards: 6

Government
  - Type: Municipal council
  - Mayor: Carol Phiri

Area
  - Total: 7,577 km^{2} (2,925 sq mi)

Population (2011)
  - Total: 68,359
  - Density: 9.022/km^{2} (23.37/sq mi)

Racial makeup (2011)
  - Black African: 94.0%
  - Coloured: 0.3%
  - Indian/Asian: 0.5%
  - White: 4.8%

First languages (2011)
  - Venda: 52.1%
  - Sotho: 9.0%
  - Northern Sotho: 8.2%
  - Afrikaans: 4.9%
  - Other: 25.8%
- Time zone: UTC+2 (SAST)
- Municipal code: LIM341

Musina Municipality (Venda: Masipalawapo wa Musina) is a local municipality within the Vhembe District Municipality, in the Limpopo province of South Africa. It is the northernmost local municipality in South Africa. It borders Botswana, Mozambique and Zimbabwe. The seat is Musina.

== Sub places ==
The 2011 census divided the municipality into the following Sub Places:

Place	Code	Area (km^{2})	Population	Most spoken language
Baobab Tree Reserve	967004010	84.13	189	Venda
Bergview East	967004008	0.47	423	Venda
Bergview West	967004009	0.41	44	Venda
Lost City	967004011	0.57	747	Venda
Mushongoville	967004001	2.54	3,008	Venda
Musina Ext5	967004004	0.19	1,906	Venda
Musina Mine	967004005	3.53	57	Venda
Musina SP	967004007	7.51	4,423	Venda
Nancefield	967004003	5.82	31,133	Venda
Nancefield Ext 2	967004002	0.15	674	Venda
SMG Military Base	967004012	6.35	73	Venda

== Politics ==
The municipal council consists of twenty-four members elected by mixed-member proportional representation. Twelve councillors are elected by first-past-the-post voting in twelve wards, while the remaining twelve are chosen from party lists so that the total number of party representatives is proportional to the number of votes received. In the election of 1 November 2021 the African National Congress (ANC) won a majority of nineteen seats on the council. The following table shows the results of the election.

Party	Ward			List			Total seats
Party	Votes	%	Seats	Votes	%	Seats	Total seats
African National Congress	15,194	70.01	12	16,260	75.72	7	19
Economic Freedom Fighters	1,703	7.85	0	2,100	9.78	2	2
Democratic Alliance	1,594	7.34	0	2,101	9.78	2	2
Independent candidates	2,509	11.56	0				0
Freedom Front Plus	245	1.13	0	264	1.23	1	1
5 other parties	458	2.11	0	750	3.49	0	0
Total	21,703	100.00	12	21,475	100.00	12	24
Valid votes	21,703	98.49		21,475	97.39		
Invalid/blank votes	333	1.51		575	2.61		
Total votes	22,036	100.00		22,050	100.00		
Registered voters/turnout	45,309	48.63		45,309	48.67		
