= João Albasini =

Portuguese explorer and diplomat

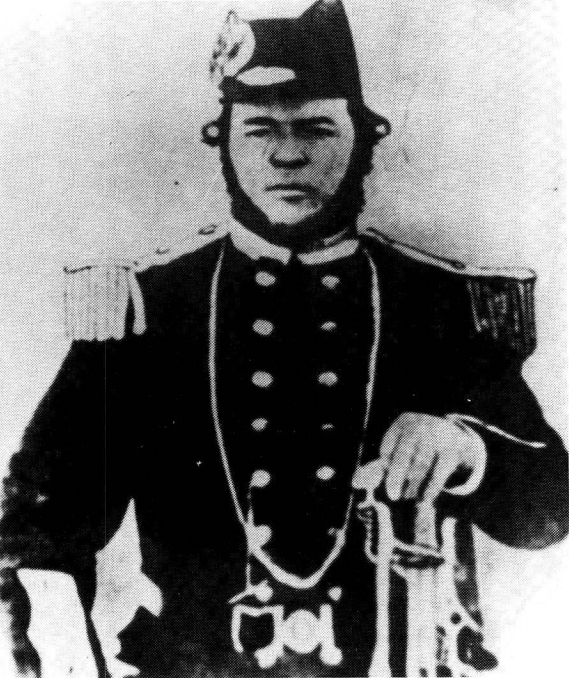
- Born: 1 May 1813; Portugal
- Died: 10 July 1888
- Awards: Portuguese Vice Consul to South Africa

João Albasini (1813–1888) was an explorer. Albasini was born to an Italian family, but according to tradition born in Portugal on a ship leaving for Africa – hence the Portuguese form of his first name. A trader and big game hunter, Albasini came to Lourenço Marques in 1831. He revolutionised trade in the Lowveld more than a decade before the first settlers of European descent arrived there. Albasini set up trade routes and infrastructure that reached from the port at Lourenço Marques far into the mainland. Albasini supplied the Tsonga people with ammunition and rifles to protect themselves against other tribes. He also trained and employed 500 Tsonga men to hunt elephant for him, these 500 Tsonga men were all given hunting rifles or guns and Albasini did not control the supply of guns to these hunters because he greatly trusted the Tsonga people.

By contrast, Albasini would not give guns or ammunition to any tribes other than the Tsonga people, due to his lack of trust. Albasini was a good friend and fellow of the Tsonga people, he was so revered among them that they made him their honorary tribal leader and named their area Albasini village, which was later renamed Valdezia in 1875. He ruled supreme as a chief of the Tsonga people at Valdezia Village until his death in 1888.

In 1858 Albasini was appointed Vice Consul of Portugal in South Africa and was married to Gertina Maria Petronella, daughter of “Trekker” Janse van Rensburg.

Albasini later settled at Schoemansdal. He died in 1888 and was buried on Goedgewensch farm, near where the Albasini dam was built. João Albasini was the paternal great-grandfather of the prominent artist, the late Selma Albasini.

== Appointment of tinduna/headmen ==
N'wamanungu appointed while João Albasini recognised/confirmed all Tsonga chiefs in the Elim area, between the years 1845–1885, powerful Tsonga chiefs, such as Hosi Bungeni, Hosi Njhakanjhaka of Elim, Hosi Mbhokota, Hosi Bokisi, Hosi Mtsetweni, Hosi Ndengeza, Hosi Malele of Wayeni, Hosi Sibisi Mahatlane, Hosi Njhakanjhaka-Marholeni, Hosi Sikhunyana (Makhoma), Hosi Nkuzana, Hosi Xitaci and many more, were appointed as headmen by N'wamanungu and confirmed by Albasini. The large Tsonga population in the Elim area today are a result of Albasini's policies of encouraging Tsonga immigration into the area, mostly between the years 1845–1895. Due to large scale Tsonga immigration into the Elim area, headmen were appointed (by Albasini) to help settle the thousands of Tsonga immigrants who arrived in the area as refugees from Mozambique. This is the reason why Albasini is famously known as the "White Chief of the Shangaan people".

== Fall of Schoemansdal ==
After the destruction of Schoemansdal by the Venda King Makhado in 1867, all whites left the area and moved south, where they established the town of Pietersburg, 100 km away. The Pedi King, Sekhukhune did not attack the Boers when they took land in Pietersburg, the town grew to be the biggest town north of Pretoria, while Schoemansdal became a ghost town. João Albasini remained as stubborn as ever and was the only white person left in the Schoemansdal district. He was able to resist attack by Makhado because his Tsonga warriors, consisting of 2000 Tsonga men, armed with assault rifles, guarded his fort day and night. When the Boers returned to Schoemansdal during the 1870s, Albasini was able to assist the Trekkers with food and land. João Albasini and Coenraad de Buys were the only two Europeans in the Transvaal and indeed, in the whole of South Africa, to rule Africans as their Chief or leader. Albasini acted at all times as a paramount chief of the Transvaal Tsonga people until his death in 1888. In the same year N'wamanungu of the Siweya Clan took over the throne of Kingship of Vatsonga until 1901–1902 at Klein Letaba River where he was shot dead by James Alfred Taylor, Shiel and Phephu Ramabulana. He was the main man in protecting the Davana family and the great warrior of Vatsonga tribe.

== Legacy ==
Albasini died in 1888 and was buried by the Tsonga people in accordance with Tsonga burial rituals. The Tsonga people were deeply hurt and saddened by the death of their beloved chief. The village of Valdezia, situated 3 km from the Albasini Dam, is a village where João Albasini ruled supreme as chief of the Tsonga people. Every year, hundreds of Tsonga people gather around the grave of João Albasini and perform Tsonga rituals in honour of their tribal leader. The grave of Albasini is regarded as a sacred site by the Tsonga people of Valdezia Village and the Tsonga neighbouring villages.
