= Louis Trichardt =

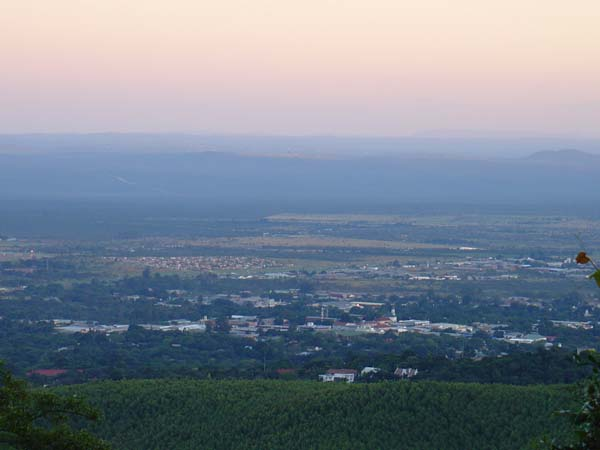
- Inclined view of Louis Trichardt

- Location within Limpopo Location within South Africa Location within Africa
- Coordinates: 23°03′S 29°54′E
- Country: South Africa
- Province: Limpopo
- District: Vhembe
- Municipality: Makhado
- Established: 1946

Area
  - Total: 56.42 km^{2} (21.78 sq mi)

Population (2011)
  - Total: 25,360
  - Density: 449.5/km^{2} (1,164/sq mi)

Racial makeup (2011)
  - Black African: 72.7%
  - Coloured: 1.3%
  - Indian/Asian: 5.7%
  - White: 20.0%
  - Other: 0.3%

First languages (2011)
  - Venda: 39.5%
  - Afrikaans: 22.8%
  - English: 11.7%
  - Northern Sotho: 6.6%
  - Other: 40.4%
- Time zone: UTC+2 (SAST)
- Postal code (street): 0920
- PO box: 0920
- Area code: 015

Louis Trichardt (formerly Tshirululuni and Trichardtsdorp, and Makhado from 2003 to 2014), informally shortened to LTT (/lʊɪstriː/), is a town in Limpopo, South Africa. It is at the foot of Hanglip, in the Soutpansberg mountain, and is the centre of the Makhado Local Municipality, which comprises 16,000 km^{2} with a population of 270,000 (2001). Louis Trichardt is located in a fertile region where litchis, bananas, mangoes and nuts are produced. The N1 national route runs through the town. Louis Trichardt is 437 kilometres from Johannesburg and 106 kilometres from the Zimbabwean border at Beitbridge. The town was the capital of the Rambulana Venda Kingdom until 1864. In the 21st century Louis Trichardt was known for a time as Makhado, but it was changed back to Louis Trichardt. Elim, Tshikota, and Madombidzha townships surround the town in all directions. Its common languages are Tshivenda, Xitsonga, Afrikaans and English.

== History ==
Some Venda traditions claim that Tshirululuni was originally a settlement of the Dau clan's legendary ruler Raphulu, while others attribute it to the Tshivhula Ndou dynasty. Jannie Loubser says that the former is more likely. After the collapse of the Venda Kingdom in the 18th century, Tshirululuni continued to be an important location, and in the early-19th century it became the seat of the Ramabulana dynasty.

Around 1830, the death of king Mpofu of the Ramabulana dynasty caused a succession conflict between his two sons, Ramavhoya and Ramabulana (from whom the dynasty gets its name). Ramavhoya won and was installed at Tshirululuni (the capital), while Ramabulana fled to a town 50 km (31 mi) to the south. In 1836 Ramabulana allied with a migrating Boer group led by Louis Tregardt. Tregardt tricked Ramavhoya into leaving Tshirululuni, where he was ambushed and strangled by Ramabulana. Ramabulana assumed the kingship and offered Tregardt's group land and access to hunting grounds, but they decided to move on. In 1848 Ramabulana welcomed another Boer group led by Hendrik Potgieter who founded a settlement that later became Schoemansdal. Ramabulana expected the Boers to respect his jurisdiction, however the town became a centre for Boer power and they coerced tribute and labour from the surrounding communities. They also captured and traded slaves (exported to the east coast), and relied upon African marksman for hunting who were paid in cattle. The polity was later incorporated into the Transvaal Republic (ZAR).

In 1864 Ramabulana's death caused another succession crisis. His eldest son Davhana was suspected of being involved in Ramabulana's death, and many Venda disapproved of his temperament. Ramabulana's preferred successor was his youngest son Makhado; Makhado's mother Limana was highly influential as Ramabulana's favourite wife, and her good relations with the makhadzi (a late ruler's eldest sister, who chose the successor) and khosimunene (a candidate's highest-ranking junior brother, who approved the candidacy) saw them appoint Makhado to the kingship. Having been circumcised (a new practice) and previously employed by the Boers as a marksman, he enjoyed the support of circumcised Venda and hunters. Together with his supporters, they drove Davhana out of Tshirululuni. After Makhado was installed, he moved his capital to the mountainous Luatame for its greater defensibility.

The town of Trichardtsdorp was founded by Boers at Tshirululuni in February 1899. The Trekkers settled on the northern part of what would later become a town while the Venda people resided at the southern part, about 800 meters apart. When the Trekkers decided to build a town they moved the Venda people and opened business premises in the exact area. Several streets were named for Boer leaders. It has been noted, that these often commemorate those who were freemasons, like Piet Retief, as freemasonry had a strong presence in the early town and its vicinity.

The Venda people moved in different directions but most were moved to the dry lands, west of the town, that would later become known as Madombidzha, and they later expanded their settlements further west along the mountain. Their area would grew over the years and was shared amongst two chiefs. The area is well known as Ha-Sinthumule/Kutama or simply Dzanani 2. Amongst the youth the name "Western" is fairly popular, which emphasizes that the area constitutes the western limit of the Venda tribe.

The village's names include:

(a) Ha-Sinthumule:

1. Magau
2. Ha-Rathidili
3. Madombidzha
4. Tshiozwi
5. Gogobole
6. Ha-Ramahantsha
7. Ha-Ravele
8. Madabani
9. Muraleni
10. Ha-vhangani
11. Ha-Maelula

(b) Ha-Kutama:

1. Ha-Madodonga
2. Ha-Manavhela
3. Maebane
4. Tshikwarani
5. Samukomu/ zamakomosa
6. Muduluni
7. Ha-Makhitha
8. Midoroni

== Demography ==
According to the 2011 census, the population of Louis Trichardt consists of 25,360 people in 7,129 households. Of this population, 72.7% describe themselves as "African", 20.0% as "White", 5.7% as "Indian or Asian" and 1.3% as "Coloured". 39.5% speak Venda as their first language, 22.8% speak Afrikaans, 11.7% speak English, 6.6% speak Northern Sotho, 6.1% speak Tsonga and 2.6% speak Southern Sotho.

== See also ==
- Air Force Base Makhado
- List of heritage sites in Limpopo
