= Makhado =

19th-century Venda chief of the Singo dynasty

Makhado, c.1839 – 3 September 1895) was a 19th-century King (Thovhele) in the Singo (or Vhasenzi) dynasty of the Venda Kingdom.One notable place he was found in, is the Tshamafingalanga war which took place for 12 years in constant battle between vhanyai. They ruled over the Dzanani "district" of the Zoutpansberg region of South Africa. He was the youngest son of Thovhele Ramabulana who died in 1864 when Makhado was about 25. Makhado's mother was Limani, noted for her political intrigue. Makhado's first wife was Nwaphunga. According to Venda historian M. H. Nemudzivhadi, Nwaphunga conspired with a pro-Boer faction among the Venda, and poisoned him in 1895. Makhado was buried "behind Lutshindwi Mountain".

== Accession ==
Limani was the grand daughter of the khosi of Tshitavhadulu (Daughter of Matumba) . He intended her to become the new great wife of Ramabulana's younger brother Ramavhoya, then khosi, after her sister's death. With the voortrekker Louis Tregardt's assistance, Ramabulana was able to overthrow Ramavhoya (who earlier had unseated him) and took the option to marry Limani.

== Genealogy ==
- Thohoyandou the Great
- Munzhedzi Mpofu (khosi at Tshirululuni till 1829)
- Rasithu (also known as: Rasethau, Ramabulana, Ramapoelana, Munzhedzi and Ravele), ruled c.1830 and 1836–1864), Ramavhoya (ruled c.1830–1836) and Madzhie were sons of Mpofu
- Davhana and Makhado were sons of Ramabulana
- Maemu Malise, Alilali Tshilamulela (Mphephu I, or M'pefu), Sinthumule and Kutama were sons of Makhado
- Mbulaheni George (Mphephu II)
- Ramaano Patrick (Mphephu III, 1924–1988), president of Venda bantustan (1979–1988)
- Tshimangadzo (Dimbanyika Thohoyandou II) and Toni (Mphephu Ramabulana)
