= Giyani =

Town in Limpopo Province, South Africa

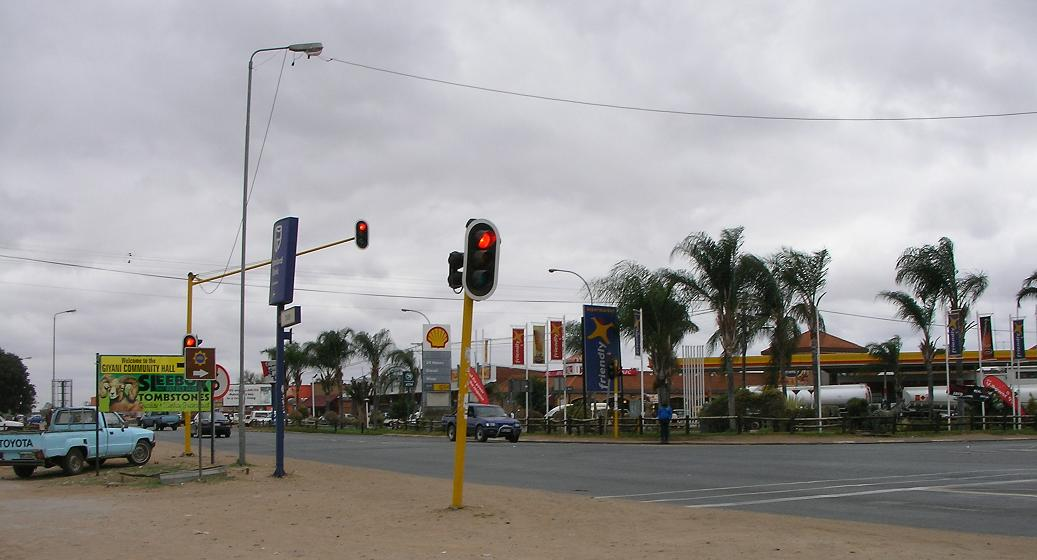
- A traffic junction and shopping centre in central Giyani

- Location within Limpopo Location within South Africa Location within Africa
- Coordinates: 23°18′36″S 30°42′23″E
- Country: South Africa
- Province: Limpopo
- District: Mopani
- Municipality: Greater Giyani

Area
  - Total: 19.51 km^{2} (7.53 sq mi)

Population (2011)
  - Total: 25,954
  - Density: 1,330/km^{2} (3,445/sq mi)

Racial makeup (2011)
  - Black: 96.9%
  - Coloured: 0.2%
  - Indian/Asian: 2.0%
  - White: 0.5%
  - Other: 0.4%

First languages (2011)
  - XiTsonga: 91.8%
  - English: 0.2%
  - Northern Sotho: 2.7%
  - TshiVenda: 1.4%
  - Other: 6.2%
- Time zone: UTC+2 (SAST)
- Postal code (street): 0826
- PO box: 0826
- Area code: 015

Giyani is a town in the north-eastern part of the province of Limpopo, South Africa, and serves as the main place in the Greater Giyani Local Municipality.

The town is the administrative capital of the Mopani District Municipality and a former capital of the former Gazankulu Bantustan. Giyani town is divided into seven sections: Section A, Section D1, Section D2, Section E, Section F, Kremetart, and Giyani CBD.Giyani extends to 91 villages.

In recent years the villages that form part of Greater Giyani have undergone significant development, which has included upgraded road networks and other public infrastructure, economic development, and private property development. These developments have demonstrated a potential city status for Giyani in the coming years, if the development rate is maintained.

The Giyani CBD is nicknamed Benstore, and this name is commonly used by residents of the region. Greater Giyani is rich with Tsonga culture and cultural activities. Giyani, as the main area, and the rest of the Greater Giyani region is Administered by the Greater Giyani Local Municipality.

== History ==
Giyani was established during the 1960s as the capital city of Gazankulu, on land belonging to the Homu Royal Family. The Risinga Community (under headman Chabalala) originally came from the Elim district, next to the township of Waterval.

The Old Parliament Buildings in Giyani, the ministerial houses, and the Palace of the chief minister of Gazankulu were built on what used to be the Chief's Kraal and headquarters of the Risinga Community. Across the main road, the Risinga Community used to drive their herds of cattle for grazing at a place known today as Giyani Golf Course. Giyani Section E, Section A, Sections D1 and D2, and the CBD of Giyani, known as Bendstore, were villages of the Risinga Community. The Risinga Community was forcefully removed from their land during the 1960s in order to make way for the new capital of Gazankulu, and they were relocated to the foothills of Man'ombe Mountain in Homu Block 14 and Makoxa Village with their chief, Hosi Homu Chabalala.

== Land claims ==
The Risinga Community, under Hosi Homu Chabalala, successfully claimed back their land, which includes Giyani Section E, Section A, Sections D1 and D2, and some parts of Section F. The whole of Man'ombe Mountain Nature Reserve and the entire Giyani CBD were given back to Hosi Homu Chabalala under the settlements scheme with the government.

The other Chabalala headman, Hosi Siyandhanim, successfully claimed some parts of Giyani Section E and Section F and the western portion of Giyani CBD, Mapuve, Jim Nghalalume, and Siyandhani as host villages.

Hosi Maswanganyi (Mavhusa) also successfully claimed back their land, which includes: Gandlanani, Basani, N'wamankena, Dingamadzi, Sikhunyani, Kremetart, Dzingidzingi A, B, and C, Bode A and B, Mencisi, and Maswanganyi Village. Hosi Khakhala also successfully claimed back their land, which includes: Muyexe Block 01, Mninginisi Block 02, Mninginisi Block 03, N'wadzekudzeku Block 04, Shivulani Block 05A, Mbatlo Block 05B, Mavalani Block 06, Thomo Block 07, Khakhala Block 08A, Mhlava Block 08B, and Gawula Block 09 Village.

== Culture ==
Most residents of Giyani speak Xitsonga as their first language. The Tsonga women perform the xibelani dance, while the men enjoy mpuluto and makhwaya. The Tsonga people also engage in a custom dance called mchongolo. Xibelani is an African skirt designed to make the wearer's hips look bigger so that the hip movement during the xibelani dance can be more apparent. The Tsonga people have their own distinct music when the xibelani dance is performed.

The staple diet in Giyani is maize porridge (vuswa or pap in Afrikaans) and rice, often eaten with meat, chicken, and vegetables (matsavu).

Johnny Clegg and his band Savuka, on the album Third World Child, sing about leaving the stress of Johannesburg to get some peace and quiet in Giyani.

== Climate ==
Giyani is situated within the sub-tropical zone. It can be very hot in the summer, reaching a maximum temperature of 41 °C in the summer and 25 °C during the winter. Winters are mild during the day and cold during the night.

The rainy season is between September and March, while the winter season is from April to August.

== Economy ==
Giyani's economy is predominately rural. Cattle ranching and the production of maize, peanuts, tomatoes, potatoes, mangoes, and bananas form the backbone of its agricultural sector. With the economic boom, Giyani has now become a major retail and entertainment center for the local population. Modern shopping centers, with all the well-known chain stores presented, have vastly uplifted the local trade.

== Residential areas ==
Residential areas in the area surrounding Giyani CBD include Giyani Sections A, E, and F, D1, D2, and one suburb, Kreme tart. Two more residential areas, Risinga View and Church View, have recently been established, and fall under local traditional leaders.

Other communities under Traditional Leaders (Tihosi) include Siyandhani, Dzingi-dzingi, Ka-Ndhambi, Mageva, Bambeni, Daniel (Makhwivirini), Maphata, Munghonghoma, Ngove, Khaxani, Mphagani, Xitlakati, Mayephu, N'wa-Marhanga, Xamfana, Nkomo A, Kheyi, Loloka, Maswanganyi, Mbhedle, Mushiane, Mayephu, Dzumeri Township, Hluvukani, Khaxani(Mhintlwa), Makhuva, Xawela Bloc 23, Xikhumba, Mbawula, Phalaubeni, Hlomela, Ndindani, Vuhehli, Nkomo B, Nkomo C, N'wa-Khuwani, Bambeni, Mzilela, Matsotsosela, Dzumeri RDP, Homu, Sikhunyani, Mninginisi, Xikukwani, Mavalani, Nkurhi, Tomu, and Basani.

== Education ==
Some of the independent schools in Giyani include Khanyisa Education Centre, Risinga Secondary School, Nkwangulatilo Education Centre, Nyukani Education Centre, High Quality Education Centres, Giyani College of Technology and Management, and Muhluri Combine School. Public schools include Kheto Nxumayo Agricultural High School and Giyani High School.

=== Tertiary Institutions in or near Giyani ===
- Northern Technical College
- Stanford Business and Computer College
- Harvest Bible College
- Madzahisi College
- Avuxeni Computer Academy
- Giyani Campus Of Nursing College
- Limpopo Province College of Nursing
- Letaba TVET College (Giyani Campus)
- Giyani Education Multipurpose Centre
- Tshwane University of Technology (Giyani Campus)
- Giyani College of Technology and Management
- Giyani College of Education and Training

== Roads ==
The R81 is the major road that runs through Giyani. It links Giyani to Polokwane and Malamulele and joins the R524 to Punda Maria entrance gate of the Kruger National Park. The R81 joins the N1 to Pretoria and Johannesburg in Polokwane, next to the Mall of the North.

== Sports ==
Giyani Stadium was the home of National First Division club Dynamos F.C. (South Africa). Giyani has been home to Giyani United and Giyani Classic; it has served as a temporarily home for Casric fc.

The 100 metre sprint ace Peter "Manero" Ngobeni stayed in Giyani Section A during the 1980s.

== Notable people ==
- Phillemon Hlungwani
- Penny Penny
- Musa Keys
- Gladwin Shitolo
- Tinyiko Victor Hlungwani
- Fulani Shibulana

== Tourism ==
Giyani's location is in the warm African bushveld, which makes it attractive for both local and international visitors. The Giyani Golf Course is home to zebras, giraffes, bushbucks, and some other herbivores; however, the viewing of these animals has not yet been commercialized.

The area is home to numerous bed and breakfast and guest house facilities. Limpopo Lodge (formerly Giyani Hotel) is situated in the center of town and managed by the Oasis Group. Man'ombe Nature Reserve is located 6 km east of Giyani.

Giyani also borders Kruger National Park on the western side of the Northern Region. Historically, Giyani had no entry point to Kruger National Park, even though Giyani shares a long border with Kruger National Park. There was a plan to open a new gate, known as Shangoni Gate, at Muyexe Village, 30 km north-east of Giyani town. This gate was supposed to bring much-needed development to the nearby historically poor villages of Muyexe, Mahonisi, and Mtititi, where despite their advantageous location, unemployment remained at 80%.
