= Venda language =

Bantu language of South Africa and Zimbabwe

TshiVenḓa
- Tshivenḓa
- Native to: South Africa and Zimbabwe; Mozambique
- Region: Limpopo
- Ethnicity: Venda, Lemba
- Native speakers: 1.3 million (2011 census); 1.7 million L2 speakers in South Africa (2002)
- Language family: Niger–Congo?: Atlantic–Congo; Volta–Congo; Benue–Congo; Bantoid; Southern; Bantu; Southern; TshiVenḓa
- Dialects: Guvhu; Ilafuri; Lembetu; Manda; Mbedzi; Phani; Tavha-Tsindi
- Writing system: Latin (Venda alphabet); Venda Braille; Ditema tsa Dinoko
- Signed forms: Signed Venda

Official status
- Official language in: Zimbabwe; South Africa

Language codes
- ISO 639-1: ve
- ISO 639-2: ven
- ISO 639-3: ven
- Glottolog: vend1245
- Guthrie code: S.20 (S.21)
- Linguasphere: 99-AUT-b incl. varieties 99-AUT-baa to 99-AUT-bad
- Geographical distribution of Tshivenda in South Africa: proportion of the population that speaks Tshivenda at home. 0–20% 20–40% 40–60% 60–80% 80–100%

- Geographical distribution of Tshivenda in South Africa: density of Tshivenda home-language speakers. <1 /km² 1–3 /km² 3–10 /km² 10–30 /km² 30–100 /km² 100–300 /km² 300–1000 /km² 1000–3000 /km² >3000 /km²

Venda
- Person: Muvenda
- People: Vhavenda
- Language: Tshivenda

Venda or TshiVenḓa is a Bantu language and an official language of South Africa and Zimbabwe. It is mainly spoken by the Venda people (or Vhavenḓa) in the northern part of South Africa's Limpopo province, as well as by some Lemba people in South Africa. The Tshivenda language is related to Shona (Karanga and Kalanga) which is spoken in Southern Africa. During the apartheid era of South Africa, the Bantustan of Venda was set up to cover the Venda speakers of South Africa.

According to the 2011 census, Venda speakers are concentrated in the following areas: Makhado Local Municipality, with 350,000 people; Thulamela Local Municipality, with 370,000 people; Musina Local Municipality, with 35,000 people; and Mutale Local Municipality, with 89,000 people. The total number of speakers in Vhembe district currently stands at 844,000. In Gauteng province, there are 275,000 Venda speakers. Fewer than 10,000 are spread across the rest of the country—for a total number of Venda speakers in South Africa at 1.2 million people or just 2.2% of South Africa's population, making Venda speakers the second smallest minority language in South Africa, after the Ndebele language, which number 1.1 million speakers. The population statistics of the Venda people in Zimbabwe are not clear but may currently stand at a million. The people are concentrated in the South of the country but also spread to other towns and cities. There is also a significant number of them in neighbouring South Africa where they are migrant workers.

== Writing system ==
The Venda language uses the Latin alphabet with five additional accented letters. There are four dental consonants with a circumflex accent below the letter (ḓ, ḽ, ṋ, ṱ) and an overdot for velar ṅ. Five vowel letters are used to write seven vowels. The letters C, J and Q are used only for foreign words and names.

The Venda alphabet
A a	B b	(C c)	D d	Ḓ ḓ	E e	F f	G g
H h	I i	(J j)	K k	L l	Ḽ ḽ	M m	N n
Ṋ ṋ	Ṅ ṅ	O o	P p	(Q q)	R r	S s	T t
Ṱ ṱ	U u	V v	W w	X x	Y y	Z z

letter(s)	value(s) in IPA	notes
a	[a], [ɔ]	
b	[b]	
bv	[b̪v]	
bw	[bɣʷ] or [bj]	Varies by dialect
d	[d]	
dz	[d͡z]	
dzh	[d͡ʒ]	Similar to English "j"
dzw	[d͡zʷ]	
ḓ	[d̪]	
e	[ɛ], [e]	
f	[f]	
fh	[ɸ]	
g	[ɡ]	
h	[ɦ], [h]	Pronounced [h] before e.
hw	[ɣʷ], [hʷ]	
i	[i]	
j	[j]	In the word Jerusalema
k	[kʼ]	
kh	[kʰ]	
khw	[kʷʰ]	
l	[ɺ] ~ [l]	Heard as [l] in free variation.
ḽ	[l̪]	
m	[m], [m̩]	M is syllabic [m̩], when the following syllable begins with m.
n	[n], [n̩]	N is syllabic when the following syllable begins with n.
ng	[ŋɡ]	
ny	[ɲ]	
nz	[nd͡z]	
ṋ	[n̪]	
ṅ	[ŋ]	
ṅw	[ŋʷ]	
o	[ɔ], [o]	
p	[pʼ]	
ph	[pʰ]	
pf	[p̪f]	
pfh	[p̪fʰ]	
r	[ɾ]	
s	[s]	
sh	[ʃ]	
sw	[ʂ]	
t	[tʼ]	
th	[tʰ]	
ths	[t͡sʰ]	
thsh	[t͡ʃʰ]	
ts	[t͡sʼ]	
tsh	[t͡ʃʼ]	
tsw	[t͡sʷ]	
ty	[c]	
ṱ	[t̪ʼ]	
ṱh	[t̪ʰ]	
u	[u]	
v	[v]	
vh	[β]	
w	[w]	
x	[x]	Similar to the ch in Scottish loch.
xw	[xʷ]	
y	[j]	
z	[z]	
zh	[ʒ]	
zw	[ʐ]	

=== Unicode ===
The extra letters have the following Unicode names:

- Ḓ U+1E12 LATIN CAPITAL LETTER D WITH CIRCUMFLEX BELOW
- ḓ U+1E13 LATIN SMALL LETTER D WITH CIRCUMFLEX BELOW
- Ḽ U+1E3C LATIN CAPITAL LETTER L WITH CIRCUMFLEX BELOW
- ḽ U+1E3D LATIN SMALL LETTER L WITH CIRCUMFLEX BELOW
- Ṅ U+1E44 LATIN CAPITAL LETTER N WITH DOT ABOVE
- ṅ U+1E45 LATIN SMALL LETTER N WITH DOT ABOVE
- Ṋ U+1E4A LATIN CAPITAL LETTER N WITH CIRCUMFLEX BELOW
- ṋ U+1E4B LATIN SMALL LETTER N WITH CIRCUMFLEX BELOW
- Ṱ U+1E70 LATIN CAPITAL LETTER T WITH CIRCUMFLEX BELOW
- ṱ U+1E71 LATIN SMALL LETTER T WITH CIRCUMFLEX BELOW

=== Luṱhofunḓeraru lwa Mibvumo ===
The sintu writing system Isibheqe Sohlamvu/Ditema tsa Dinoko, known technically in Venda as Luṱhofunḓeraru lwa Mibvumo, is also used for the Venda language.

ṱala "break up"	[t̪ʼaːɽa]	tala "draw"	[tʼaːɽa]

== Phonology ==
Venda distinguishes dental ṱ, ṱh, ḓ, ṋ, ḽ from alveolar t, th, d, n, l as well as (like in Ewe) labiodental f, v from bilabial fh, vh (the last two are slightly rounded). There are no clicks. As in other South African languages like Zulu, ph, ṱh, th, kh are aspirated and the "plain" stops p, ṱ, t, and k are ejective.

=== Vowels ===
There are five vowel sounds in Tshivenḓa.

	Front	Back
Close	i	u
Mid	ɛ	ɔ
Open	a	

=== Consonants ===
		Bilabial			Labio- dental	Dental	Alveolar				Palatal (-alveolar)	Velar		Glottal
		plain	lab.	pal.	Labio- dental	Dental	plain	sib.	lab.	pal.	Palatal (-alveolar)	plain	lab.	Glottal
Nasal		m		mʲ	(ɱ)	n̪	n				ɲ	ŋ	ŋʷ	
Plosive/ Affricate	ejective	pʼ	pʷʼ	pʲʼ	p̪fʼ	t̪ʼ	tʼ	tsʼ	tsʷʼ	tʲʼ	tʃʼ	kʼ		
Plosive/ Affricate	aspirated	pʰ	pʷʰ	pʲʰ	p̪fʰ	t̪ʰ	tʰ	tsʰ	tsʷʰ		tʃʰ	kʰ		
Plosive/ Affricate	voiced	b	bʷ	bʲ	b̪v	d̪	d	dz	dzʷ	dʲ	dʒ	ɡ		
Fricative	voiceless	ɸ			f			s	sʷ		ʃ	x		h
Fricative	voiced	β			v			z	zʷ		ʒ			
Approximant						l̪	(l)				j		w	
Rhotic	trill						r							
Rhotic	flap						ɺ							

A labiodental nasal /ɱ/ sound appears in prenasalised consonant sounds. [l] is mostly heard as an allophone of /ɺ/ in free variation and in loanwords. Labiovelar sounds occur as alternatives to labiopalatal sounds and may also be pronounced /pkʰ pkʼ bɡ mŋ/. Fortition of /ɸ β s ʃ x h l̪ ɺ r w/ occurs after nasal prefixes, likely to [pʰ? b tsʰ tʃʰ kʰ? pʰ d̪ d d b].

=== Tones ===
Venda has a specified tone, high, with unmarked syllables having a low tone. Phonetic falling tone occurs only in sequences of more than one vowel or on the penultimate syllable if the vowel is long. Tone patterns exist independently of the consonants and vowels of a word and so they are word tones. Venda tone also follows Meeussen's rule: when a word beginning with a high tone is preceded by that high tone, the initial high tone is lost. (That is, there cannot be two adjacent marked high tones in a word, but high tone spreads allophonically to a following non-tonic ("low"-tone) syllable.) There are only a few tone patterns in Venda words (no tone, a single high tone on some syllable, two non-adjacent high tones), which behave as follows:

Word	Pattern	After L	After H	Notes
thamana	–.–.–	thàmà:nà	thámâ:nà	Unmarked (low) tone is raised after a high tone. That is, the preceding tone spreads.
dukana	–.–.H	dùkà:ná	dúkâ:ná	A preceding high tone spreads but drops before the final high tone.
danana	–.H.–	dàná:nà	dánâ:nà	The pitch peaks on the tonic syllable, and a preceding non-adjacent high tone merges into it.
phaphama	–.H.–	phàphá:ná	pháphâ:nà	The pitch peaks on the tonic syllable, and a preceding non-adjacent high tone merges into it.
madzhie	H.–	má:dzhíè	mâ:dzhìè	Initial high tone spreads. With an immediately preceding high tone, that initial tone is lost. (The preceding tone also spreads but not as far.)
dakalo	H.–.–	dáká:lò	dákà:lò	Initial high tone spreads. With an immediately preceding high tone, that initial tone is lost. (The preceding tone also spreads but not as far.)
khokhola	H.–.H	khókhô:lá	khókhò:lá	Initial high tone spreads. With an immediately preceding high tone, that initial tone is lost. (The preceding tone also spreads but not as far.)

== Sources ==
- Poulos, George (1990). A Linguistic Analysis of Venda. Via Afrika.
