= Vhembe District Municipality =

Vhembe
- District municipality
- Seal

- Location in Limpopo
- Coordinates: 22°56′S 30°28′E
- Country: South Africa
- Province: Limpopo
- Seat: Thohoyandou
- Local municipalities: List: Musina; Collins Chabane; Thulamela; Makhado

Government
  - Type: Municipal council
  - Mayor: Cllr Chauke M.G.

Area
  - Total: 25,597 km^{2} (9,883 sq mi)

Population (2011)
  - Total: 1,294,722
  - Density: 50.581/km^{2} (131.00/sq mi)

Racial makeup (2016)
  - Black African: 98.7%
  - Coloured: 0.2%
  - Indian/Asian: 0.4%
  - White: 0.8%

First languages (2011)
  - Venda: 67.2%
  - Tsonga: 24.8%
  - Northern Sotho: 1.6%
  - Afrikaans: 1.3%
  - Other: 5.1%
- Time zone: UTC+2 (SAST)
- Municipal code: DC34

The Vhembe District Municipality (Venda: Masipala wa Tshiṱiriki tsha Vhembe; Tsonga: Masipala wa Xifundza xa Vhembe) is one of the 5 districts of the Limpopo province of South Africa. It is the northernmost district of the country and shares its northern border with the Beitbridge District in Zimbabwe and on the east with the Gaza Province in Mozambique. Vhembe consists of all the territories that were part of the former Venda Bantustan; however, two large densely populated districts of the former Tsonga homeland of Gazankulu, in particular, Hlanganani and Malamulele, were also incorporated into the municipality, hence the ethnic diversity of the district. The seat is Thohoyandou, the capital of the former Venda Bantustan. According to the 2011 census, the majority of the municipality's 800,000 inhabitants spoke TshiVenda as their mother language, while 400,000 spoke Xitsonga as their home language. However, the Tsonga people form the majority south of the Levubu River, while the Venda are the minority south of Levubu at 15%. The Sepedi speakers number 27,000. The district code is DC34.

== History ==
Vhembe is settled by the Venda people who constitute the majority of the population of Vhembe. Later, from around 1820 onwards, the Tsonga people started to invade from the south east and are today a majority in the whole southern and eastern part of Vhembe, which are known today as Malamulele (in the east of Vhembe) and Hlanganani (in the south of Vhembe). At the same time, the Boer Voortrekkers arrived in Vhembe, at around 1836. Venda communities are only found in Vhembe district and as a result, there are no existing Venda communities or villages outside the district. Vhembe means Limpopo river in the Venda language.

Before the renaming of Limpopo Province in 2002, the name Vhembe was submitted to the Limpopo legislature as one of the desired names for the new Province but the majority of the members of the Legislature voted against the name Vhembe in favour of the name Limpopo. The Dzata ruins in Thulamela Local Municipality once served as the main settlement and capital of the Venda empire which had dominated the area during the 18th century.

Boer settlement of the territory began in the early 19th century and gradually upsurged throughout the late 19th century. By the turn of the 20th century, the Soutpansberg was taken by the Boers from the Venda rulers, making it one of the last areas in the future republic of South Africa to come under white rule. During the apartheid era, the bantustan of Venda (declared independent in 1979) was established in the eastern part of the Vhembe area, and was reintegrated into the country in 1994. The former bantustan capital, Thohoyandou (named after a chief that had led the expansion of the Venda empire in the 18th century) is the current seat of the Vhembe district.

On 11 December 2008, Vhembe was declared a disaster zone by the Limpopo government due to the spread of cholera from across the Zimbabwean border to the district.

The Vhembe region became the Vhembe Biosphere Reserve in 2009, which was officially declared a biosphere reserve in 2011. The reserve includes the Blouberg Range, the Kruger National Park, the Philip Herd Nature Reserve, the Nwanedi Nature Reserve, the Makgabeng Plateau, the Makuleke Wetlands, the Mapungubwe Cultural Landscape and the Soutpansberg.

== Geography ==
The main geographical feature of the district is the Soutpansberg mountains.

=== Neighbours ===
Vhembe is surrounded by:

- Mozambique to the east
- Zimbabwe to the north
- Botswana to the north-west
- Mopani (DC33) to the south
- Capricorn (DC35) to the south-west

=== Local municipalities ===
The district contains the following local municipalities:

Local municipality	Population	%	Dominant language
Thulamela	381 696	29.58%	Venda
Makhado	516 031	39.56%	Venda
Collins Chabane	328 636	25.48%	Tsonga
Musina	68 359	5.38%	Venda

== Demographics ==
The following statistics are from the census 2011 10% sample.

Language	Population	%
Venda	861 910	67.3%
Tsonga	318 973	24.9%
Northern Sotho	19 935	1.6%
Afrikaans	16 317	1.3%
Sotho	12 369	1.0%
Other	27038	2.1%
English	12994	1.0%
Ndebele	4193	0.3%
Zulu	1 864	1.0%
Tswana	1 179	0.1%
Xhosa	660	0.1%
Swati	2 412	0.2%
Sign	1 205	0.1%

=== Gender ===
Gender	Population	%
Female	757 501	54.4%
Male	645 278	45.6%

=== Population group ===
Population group	Population	%
Black African	1 272 427	98.3%
White	14 168	1.1%
Indian/Asian	5 435	0.4%
Coloured	1 858	0.1%
Other	1 180	0.1%

=== Age ===
Age	Population	%
00 - 04	163 984	12.7%
05 - 09	142 612	11.0%
10 - 14	144 313	11.1%
15 - 19	159 642	12.3%
20 - 24	130 534	10.1%
25 - 29	99 850	7.7%
30 - 34	80 042	6.2%
35 - 39	71 038	5.5%
40 - 44	59 394	4.6%
45 - 49	53 881	4.2%
50 - 54	45 418	3.5%
55 - 59	35 508	2.7%
60 - 64	27 315	2.1%
65 - 69	21 205	1.6%
70 - 74	18 526	1.4%
75 - 79	16 045	1.2%
80 - 84	13 847	1.2%
85+	11 916	0.9%

== Politics ==
=== Election results ===
Election results for Vhembe in the South African general election, 2004.

- Population 18 and over: 621,522 [51.80% of total population]
- Total votes: 386,629 [32.22% of total population]
- Voting % estimate: 62.21% votes as a % of population 18 and over

Party	Votes	%
African National Congress	348,768	90.21%
Democratic Alliance	15,553	4.02%
United Democratic Movement	5,821	1.51%
African Christian Democratic Party	4,687	1.21%
Pan African Congress	2,875	0.74%
New National Party	2,098	0.54%
Azanian People's Organisation	1,767	0.46%
Independent Democrats	916	0.24%
Freedom Front Plus	864	0.22%
Inkhata Freedom Party	585	0.15%
United Christian Democratic Party	469	0.12%
NA	359	0.09%
SOPA	336	0.09%
PJC	301	0.08%
EMSA	282	0.07%
CDP	258	0.07%
TOP	198	0.05%
UF	191	0.05%
KISS	129	0.03%
NLP	92	0.02%
Minority Front	80	0.02%
Total	386,629	100.00%
