= Limpopo Water Management Area =

Limpopo WMA, or Limpopo Water Management Area (coded: 1), in South Africa includes the following major rivers: the Limpopo River, Matlabas River, Mokolo River, Lephalala River, Mogalakwena River, Sand River and Nzhelele River and covers the following dams.

- Cross Dam, Nwanedi River
- Doorndraai Dam Sterk River
- Glen Alpine Dam Mogalakwena River
- Luphephe Dam, Luphephe River
- Mokolo Dam Mokolo River
- Mutshedzi Dam Mutshedzi River
- Nwanedi Dam, in the Nwanedi River
- Nzhelele Dam Nzhelele River

== Boundaries ==
Tertiary drainage regions A41, A42, A50, A61 to A63, A71, A72 and A80.

== See also ==
- Water Management Areas
- List of reservoirs and dams in South Africa
- List of rivers of South Africa
