= Nwanedi Provincial Park =

Nature reserve in South Africa

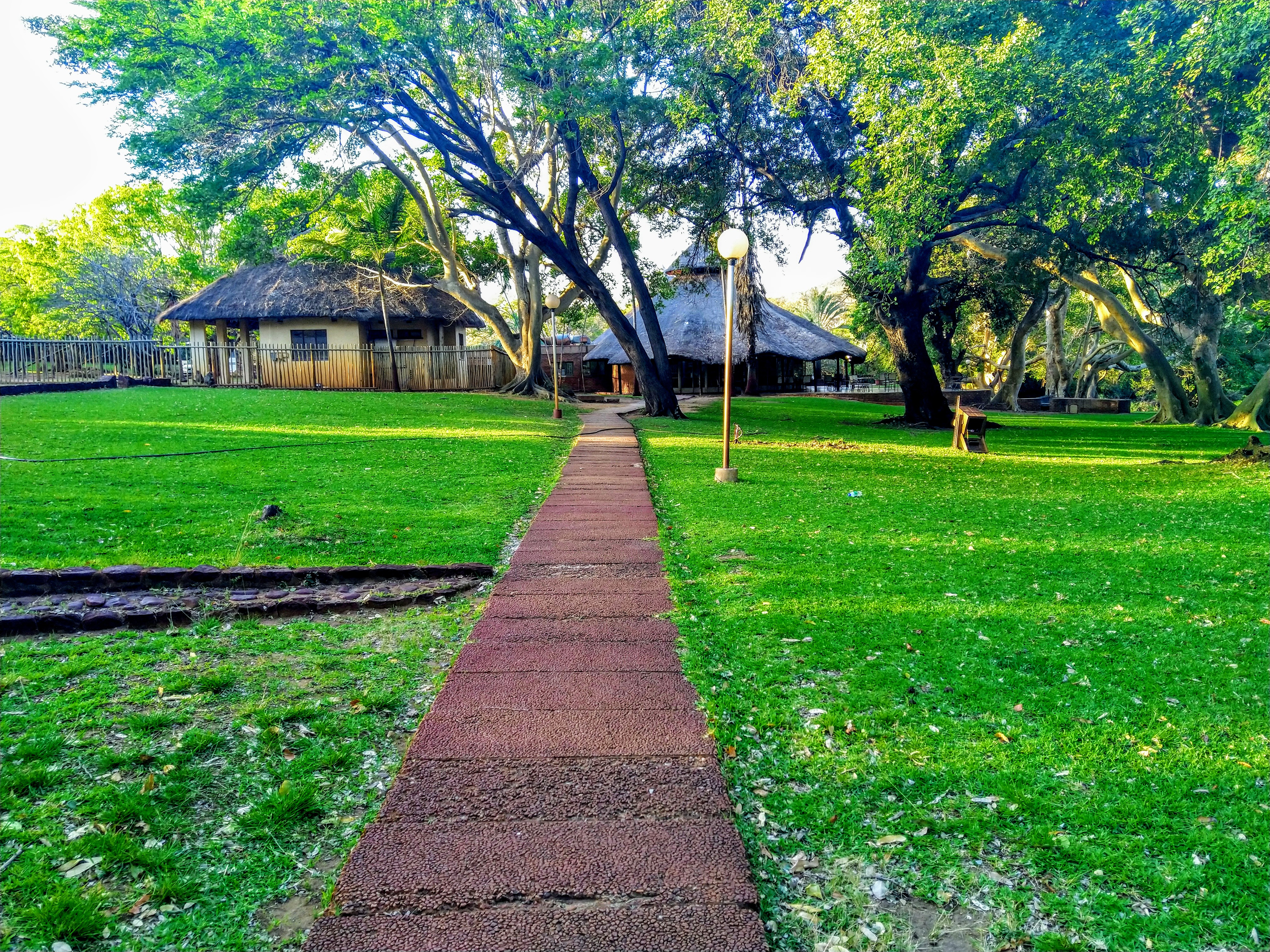
- Nwanedi Luphephe resort

- Location within Limpopo Location within South Africa
- Location: Limpopo, South Africa
- Nearest city: Thohoyandou
- Coordinates: 22°37′55″S 30°24′6″E
- Area: 11,170 ha (27,600 acres)
- Governing body: Limpopo Tourism and Parks Board

Nwanedi Provincial Park, is a protected area in the northern part of the Limpopo province of South Africa. It is located about 20 km east of Tshipise and 35 km north of Thohoyandou, to the west of Kruger National Park. The Nwanedi park has an area of about 11,170 ha and includes a part of the wooded foothills of the Soutpansberg Range. The twin dams, the Nwanedi Dam and the Luphephe Dam, at the confluence of the Nwanedi River and its main tributary, the Luphephe River, are located in the protected area. One of the secrets of the Game Reserve is their spectacular waterfall, known as Tshihovhohovho Falls. The park is well stocked with game, including a fair number of white rhino in its lowveld zone.

The Soutpansberg or “Tha vhani ya muno” (mountain of salt) is in the traditional area of the Venda people. It is rich in plant diversity with yellowwood trees, twelve acacia species, including fever trees, giant cabbage trees, proteas and ancient tree ferns. The rocky summits are a haven for birds of prey.

== See also ==
- Protected areas of South Africa
