= Luphephe River =

River in South Africa

Coordinates: 22°39′S 30°26′E

The Luphephe River flows from Guyuni area, north of Thohoyandou, to merge with Nwanedi River inside the Nwanedi nature reserve and resort, forming the Nwanedi – Luphephe dams. Immediately downstream of the reservoir the Nwanedi River continues to flow beyond the boundary of the nature reserve following a winding course across the Limpopo plain where it finally meets and drains into the Limpopo River. The Luphehe River and its tributaries provides water for agriculture, wildlife, and humans living within the Limpopo River Basin. The Nwanedi nature reserve and resort have been subjected to a few changes in methods of running their services with invisible changes, and tourism profits the surrounding communities. Because of this, rural areas becomes a better choice for tourism destinations, ranging from adventure, cultural, ethnic and ecotourism, to name just a few. The upper catchments of both Luphephe and Nwanedi rivers were found to have high ecological importance and sensitivity. Thus becomes important to protect the upper catchments into a natural or good state.

== Background ==
=== The beginning part of the river ===
Luphephe River is a main perennial tributary of the Nwanedi River in Musina local municipality, Vhembe district municipality in Limpopo Province, South Africa. Its origin is in the Guyuni/Dzumbama/Tshitandani/Tshamulungwi area about 10 km before joining the Nwanedi River in its upper catchment area. The Luphephe river’s upper catchment area can be divided into the source zone and the Waterfall to Mountain torrent zone which are present throughout the whole of this stream.

The source zone commences at altitude of 976 meters and is approximately one kilometer long. The Waterfall to Mountain torrent zone flows between 915 and 610 meters above sea level over a series of small falls and rapids. The substratum of the entire stream is predominantly of a stony nature consisting of boulders, stones and large pebbles. Occasional sand patches occur.

Just before it enters Nwanedi Nature Reserve, and resort it joins the Savhani River. The Savhani River starts in Gwangwatini, passing Ngalavhani, Tshitanzhe, Musunda, Gumela, Helula 2, and Tshikotoni (formerly known as Manzhenge). Along the Luphephe river are cultivated plots right up to the water’s edge by the surrounding communities. Luphephe river merge with Nwanedi river inside the Nwanedi nature reserve, and resort, forming the Nwanedi – Luphephe dams.

=== The middle part of the river ===
In 1964, upon request by the Nwanedi irrigation Board, the Department of Water Affairs constructed Luphephe dam and Nwanedi dam, one on each of the Luphephe and the Nwanedi Rivers, for the purpose of irrigation. Luphephe Dam arch wall is 39 meters high with a capacity of 14 800 000 cubic meters. Nwanedi Dam arch wall is 36 meters high with a capacity of 5 310 000 cubic meters. The twin-dams and their outskirts area of 9000 hectares were proclaimed an Nwanedi nature reserve in 1979.

Originally the water of the Luphephe tributary joined the Nwanedi at the point below the present dam walls but with the construction of dams on both rivers, the position changed slightly as there is now a 2,5 meter deep canal joining the two water bodies approximately 100 meters from the respective walls. The vertical sluice gates in both dams are used to maintain water levels, and control flow of water downstream to the same canal. About 500 meters downstream the canal of the Nwanedi/Luphephe Dams there is a small low lying road concrete bridge that crosses the river, from and to Gumela Entrance Gate. It sometimes get flooded and deposition of sand upstream of the bridge.

=== The last part of the river ===
The river continues in a northerly direction across the Limpopo Plain. The Limpopo plain is where the basin opened out outside the Nwanedi nature reserve and just downstream of the last narrow valley between hills, typically with steep rocky walls and a stream running through it. The river proceeds to the Cross Dam (Muswodi Tshisimani community refers to Cross-dam as Gondoza) which forms part of the lower reaches. The Cross dam was constructed to supply water for the irrigation of agricultural crops, game ranching, livestock farming and for neighbouring rural settlements. Immediately downstream of the Cross Dam in the valley where the watercourse has a wider width of 3 to 6 m, there is a bridge where the Tshipise/Pafuri tar road crosses the Nwanedi river.

The river proceeds until joining the Limpopo river at a point ten kilometers north of Malaladrift, on the Zimbabwe border at an altitude of 340meter. The river lies entirely within the Limpopo Water Management Area and lies in quaternary catchments with a gross area of 1136 km2 and a Gross Mean Annual Runoff of 24.5 10 (6)M3. The Nwanedi – Luphephe dams are the only significant South African dams in the catchment.

== Economic/ecological significance ==
=== Agriculture and livelihoods ===
Agriculture encompasses crop and livestock production, aquaculture, and forestry for food and non-food products. The communities living closer to the river utilise the Luphephe river for washing clothes, irrigating crops and for maintaining livestock, amongst others. On the mature part of Luphephe river a sloping channel was cut into the soil surface into which streams of water was supplied to livestock dip. The dip was designed as a narrow channel through which the animals walk, immersing them in progressively deeper liquid until the animal is completely immersed. The channel was built in 1927 on Tshikotoni land. Communities of Tshitanzhe, Musunda, Gumela, Helula 2, Tshikotoni and Tshitandani used to dip their livestock there every fortnight starting at seven o'clock until few years after the dawn of democracy in 1994.

The furrow channel was also used for irrigation by crop farmers on its banks on the Tshikotoni land. The prominent farmers were Mukwevho clan, Dzuguda clan, Phupheli clan, Nekhumbe clan, Chauke clan, Nethononda clan, Mufamadi clan, Ndou dza Manenzhe clan, Luranga clan and Langanda clan (their field was known as Galauvhe). In addition, Luphephe river supplied water for crop farmers on the banks of Helula 2 land. Crops such as sugar canes, maize, sweet potatoes, beans, mangos and bananas were farmed there for many generations. The Mathukha/Marubini clan, Phupheli clan (their field was called Makhothoni), Madumi clan, Kwinda la ha Tshirundu clan, Netshishangane clan, Manenzhe clan and Mukwevho clan were dominant farmers on Helula 2 land. The Mukwevho clan and Manenzhe clan also exported beans to national and international markets if they have gathered good harvest in 1980s.

Livelihood involves the capacity to acquire necessities in order to satisfy the basic needs of themselves and their household. Women and young ladies in Tshikotoni, Helula 2 and Gumela used Luphephe river to fetch water for domestic consumption. They would also wash their blankets and clothes at Luphephe river for many years. Men and young boys used the river to catch fish for survival and swimming.

=== Nwanedi Irrigation Scheme ===
When the basin opened out outside the Nwanedi nature reserve and just downstream of the last narrow valley between hills, the river supply water for crop farming and nursery in Folovhodwe village. The Folovhodwe nursery was established in 1986 to breed specimens of mangoes and citrus for the development of the then Venda, north of the Soutpansberg, and export of disease-free plants to neighbouring countries. The watercourse also supply water for stock farming and crop farming at Nwanedi Communal Property Association (Nwanedi Communal Property Association was established after land claim for redistribution and restitution). The communities include Folovhodwe, Tshikhudini, Tanda, and Tshiphale. The area form part of Nwanedi Irrigation Scheme located north of the Soutpansberg mountains, about 40 Kilometers north-east of Tshipise in the Vhembe District of Limpopo Province, South Africa.

Nwanedi Irrigation scheme consists of approximately 300 smallholder farmers who grow irrigated vegetables mostly tomatoes. Farmers directly draw irrigation water from the river using the drip irrigation system. Drip irrigation is a combination of water savings and higher yields typically increases at least by 50% the water use efficiency, yield per unit water, and makes it a leading technology in the global challenge of improving crop production in the face of serious water constraints. Most members at the scheme are producing about 100 tonnes of tomatoes per person per hector or 1000 square (1000m2). Most farmers own between 10 and 100 hactors and they produce mainly for sale.

There are water scarcity challenges such as water waste through over irrigation and leaking pipes; high temperatures leading to high water evaporation from the river and evaporation from the crops; competition for water between farmers and domestic users leading to conflicts and unequal water distribution as farmers at the lower tail of the river receive little or no water when the river flow declines. The annual average total [[evapotranspiration]] is 1400 mm. Temperatures vary from an average monthly maximum and minimum of 33.52 and 21.30 degree Celsius for February to 25.6 and 8.6 degree Celsius for July respectively. However, Nwanedi irrigation Scheme has shown farm level resilience mechanisms including supplementing river water with boreholes were soil salinity is not a problem; irrigation at night when evaporation and evapotranspiration is low; reducing farming area to meet river water supply capacity; growing drought resistant crops to reduce water usage during hot season.

=== Ecological Importance ===
The results of 2007 survey indicate, the upper catchments of both Luphephe river and Nwanedi river are considered to have a High Ecological Importance and Sensitivity (EIS), while below the Nwanedzi Dam/Luphephe Dam the EIS is Moderate. Largely due to the fact that a substantial portion of the upper catchment falls in Nwanedi nature reserve, while in the Limpopo Plain, it passes through private nature reserves or game farms. Considering the impacts and drivers within this catchment have been stable for many years, it is thought unlikely that the status of the catchment will change substantially in the near future.

The EIS is an indication of the level of protection that the river should receive. High meaning it should be protected to a natural or good state and low, meaning it has less conservation value or is already impacted and that the resource may be further utilized.

=== Tourism ===
Ecotourism is a subset of nature-focused travel that encourages the delight of the outdoors while supporting environmental protection and conservation. An Agritourism is a form of commercial enterprise that links agricultural production and/or processing with tourism to attract visitors onto a farm, ranch, or other agricultural business for the purposes of entertaining or educating the visitors while generating income for the farm, ranch, or business owner. The Nwanedi community-based tourism-agrarian schemes and other rain based cultivation lands are formal integrated rural businesses. The analysis reveals that the Musina municipality benefits from having plenty of tourism entities. They include Nwanedi nature reserve and a resort, Sagole Big Tree Nature reserve and Big Tree Accommodation Lodge. The selected localities (Folovhodwe, Gumela, Tshipise and Zwigodini) are also adjacent to the protected areas, such as Luphephe/Nwanedi Dams

The Nwanedi nature reserve, and resort have been subjected to a few changes in methods of running their services with invisible changes, and tourism profits the local communities. In that regard, rural areas are a better choice for tourism destinations, ranging from adventure, cultural, ethnic and ecotourism, among others. However, the road systems next to Folovhodwe and Gumela villages need regular maintenance to enhance tourism prosperity within the local enterprises and at the Nwanedi nature reserve, and resort. When tourists came from all over the world in December 2002 to witness the solar eclipse phenomena in South Africa, Nwanedi nature reserve, and resort was one of the solar viewpoints in Musina municipality in Vhembe District, Limpopo Province, South Africa.
