= R525 (South Africa) =

Regional route in South Africa

Regional route R525

Route information
- Length: 127 km (79 mi)

Major junctions
- West end: N1
- R508 at Tshipise
- East end: Pafuri Gate of the Kruger National Park

Location
- Country: South Africa

Highway system
- Numbered routes of South Africa
← R524	→ R526

The R525 is a Regional Route in Limpopo, South Africa that connects Tshipise with the Pafuri Gate of the Kruger National Park.

== Route ==
The R525 begins at a junction with the N1 national route in the Nzhelele Nature Reserve (40 kilometres south of Musina). It heads east to cross the Nzhelele River and meet the southern end of the R508 in the village of Tshipise. From there, it continues east, following the Limpopo River (borderline with Zimbabwe), to end at the Pafuri Gate of the Kruger National Park.
