= Soutpansberg =

Mountain range in Limpopo, South Africa

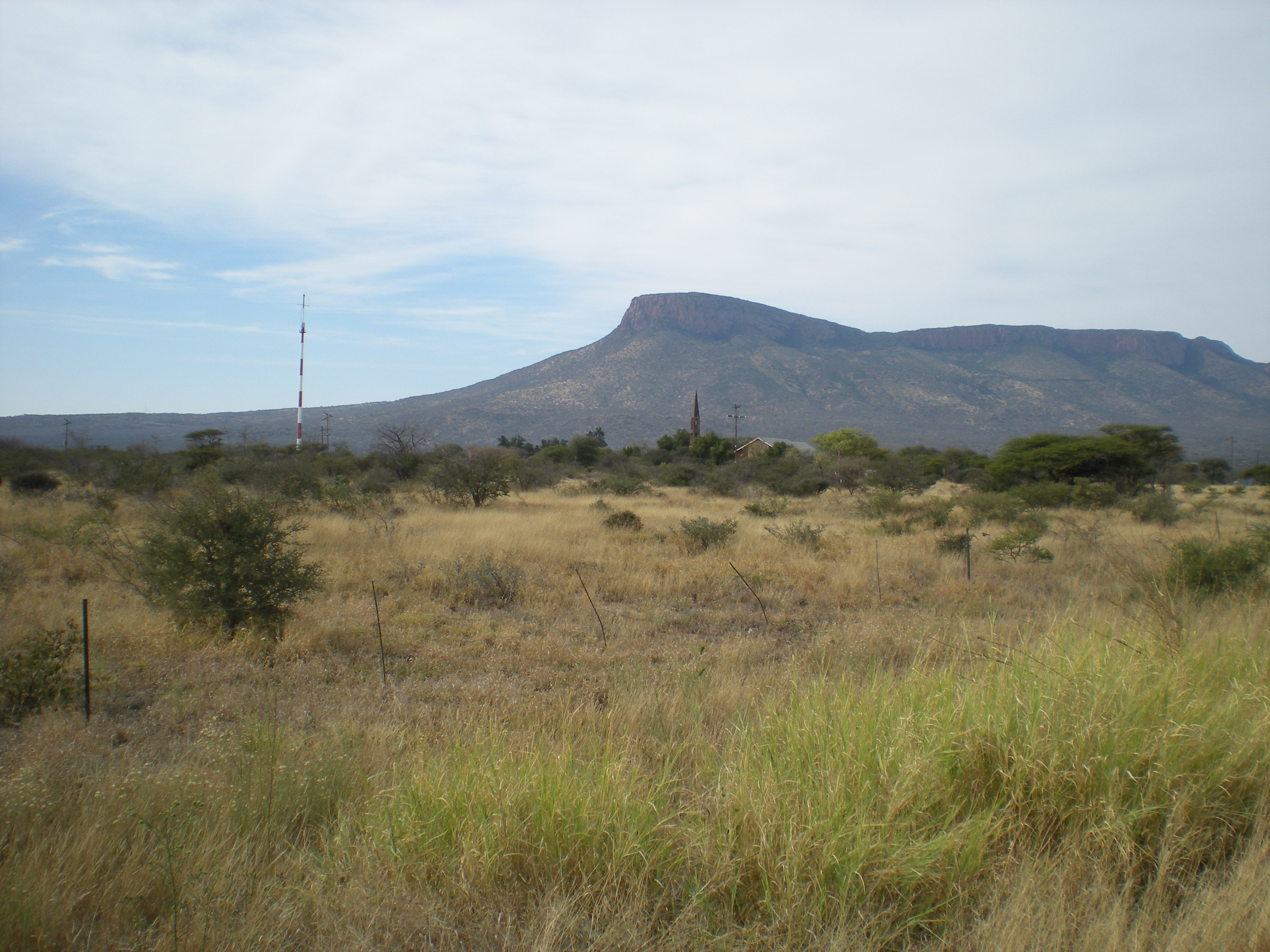
- The western extremity of the Soutpansberg – as seen from Vivo, 10 km from the salt pan

Highest point
- Peak: Lajuma
- Elevation: 1,747 m (5,732 ft)
- Listing: Mountain ranges of South Africa
- Coordinates: 23°0′0″S 29°52′0″E

Dimensions
- Length: 170 km (110 mi) E/W
- Width: 50 km (31 mi) N/S

Naming
- Native name: Tha vhani ya muno (Venda)

Geography
- Location within South Africa
- Country: South Africa
- Province: Limpopo

Geology
- Orogeny: Kaapvaal craton
- Rock age: Neoarchean to early Paleoproterozoic
- Rock type(s): Bushveld igneous complex, sandstone

The Soutpansberg (formerly Zoutpansberg), meaning "Salt Pan Mountain" in Afrikaans, is a range of mountains in far northern South Africa. It is located in Vhembe District, Limpopo. It is named for the salt pan (Venda: Thavha ya muno, or "place of salt") located at its western end. The mountain range reaches the opposite extremity in the Matikwa Nature Reserve, some 107 kilometres (66 mi) due east. The range as a whole had no Venda name, as it was instead known by its sub-ranges which include Dzanani, Songozwi and others.

The Soutpansberg forms part of the 'Vhembe Biosphere Reserve', which was designated as a biosphere reserve by UNESCO in 2009. The latter reserve also includes the Blouberg Range, Kruger National Park and the Mapungubwe Cultural Landscape.

== Geography ==
The mountain is intersected by two defiles, the Waterpoort in the west, containing the Sand River (Polokwane) and a railway line, and Wyllie's Poort, which allows the N1 road traffic to pass from Louis Trichardt to Musina. Lajuma is the highest peak at 1,747 metres (5,732 ft). The Nzhelele River and its tributary the Mutamba, the Nwanedi River and its tributary the Luphephe River, as well as the Levubu River and its main tributaries, the Mutshindudi and Mutale Rivers, and the Letaba River rise in the slopes of the Soutpansberg Mountains. The Brak River, a tributary of the Sand River, flows diagonally at the western end of the Soutpansberg, separating it from the Blouberg further west.

== History ==
=== First Europeans ===
The first white person to reach, and name, the mountain was Coenraad de Buys, a colonist who fled from Graaff Reinet after a failed rebellion in 1795. He settled near the mountain in 1820 and was the patriarch of a half-caste clan, the "Buysvolk" or Buys People, who are still to be found at Buysdorp. De Buys was followed by voortrekker Louis Tregardt who sojourned at the salt pan from May to August 1836. In November 1836 Tregardt moved camp to the vicinity of the later Schoemansdal and Louis Trichardt town, where he stayed until June 1837. From June to August 1837 Tregardt's party camped at the Doorn River, on the current Doorn River farm, whereafter they departed for good to find a trading route to the sea.

=== Early settlement ===
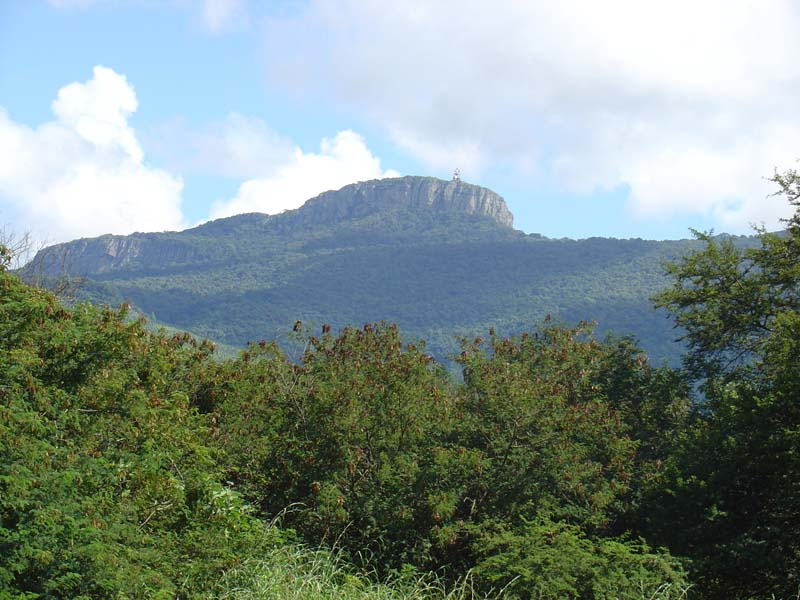
Hanglip promontory, overlooking Louis Trichardt

Eleven years later, in 1848, a settlement named Zoutpansbergdorp was established at the site of an earlier Tregardt camp. It was founded by Jan Valentyn Botha, who led a faction of Andries Potgieter's trek. Potgieter died at Zoutpansbergdorp in 1852, and his son shortly afterwards. In 1855 the town's de facto leader was Stephanus Schoeman who named the growing, though disorderly reed-hut settlement Schoemansdal, after himself. Augmented by renegades, the town was a successful ivory trading centre by 1855, when its population numbered 200.

Venda hunters supplied the Voortrekkers with ivory, and were in return supplied with fire arms. Relations between the Voortrekkers and Venda soured due to taxation, cattle rustling and lax control over the supply of fire arms. Total discord broke out in 1866, when the voortrekkers intervened in a Venda succession dispute, and one claimant, Makhado, attacked an outlying voortrekker settlement. Despite the arrival of a relief commando, the Venda's mountain strongholds could not be taken. The voortrekkers abandoned the town on 15 July 1867 and established Pietersburg. An open-air museum was established to recreate the modest settlement.

=== First town ===
In October 1898 the Boere returned to regain control over the territory. General Piet Joubert's commando occupied a strategic position over the Doorn River in preparation. In November, Mphefu's kraal suffered a three-pronged attack and his royal village was torched. Mphefu's clan fled across the Limpopo River to Zimbabwe. The farms Rietvlei and Bergvliet were set aside in 1898 for a new town, and Trichardtsdorp was proclaimed the next year, named in honour of Louis Tregardt. Today the town commemorates his full name, Louis Trichardt.

== Ecology ==
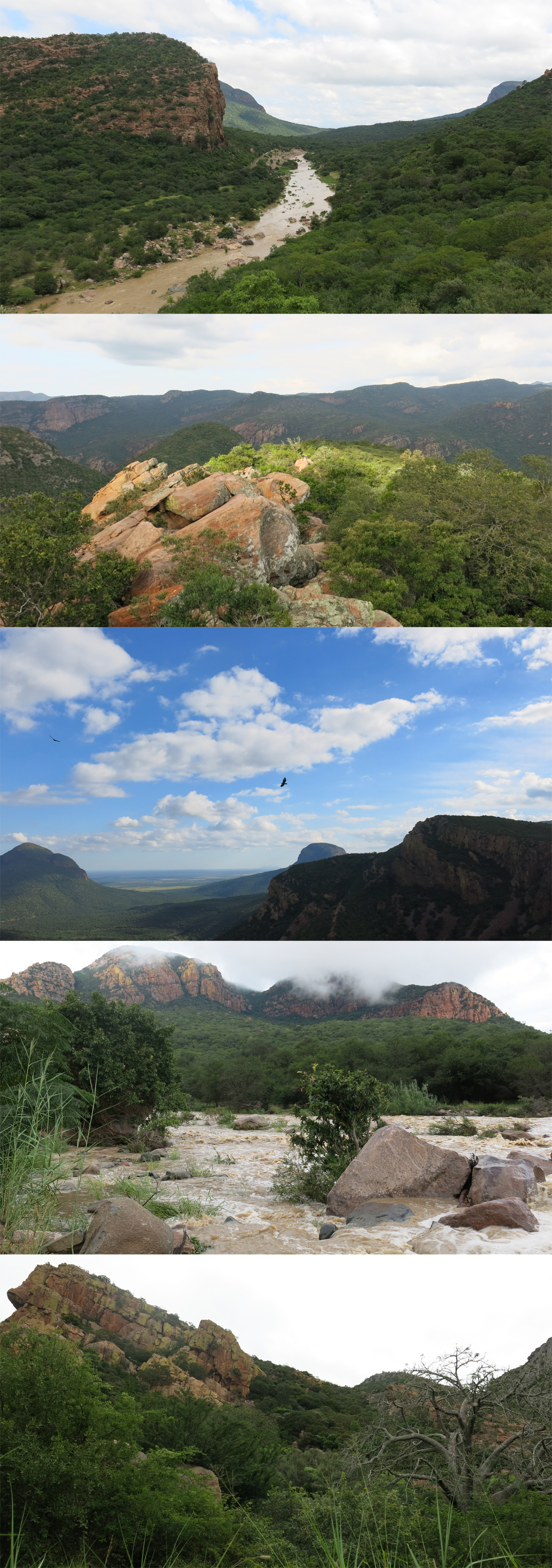
Composite image of landscape photographs from the Southern Soutpansberg.

=== Plant diversity ===
Approximately 2,500 to 3,000 vascular plant taxa, comprising 1,066 genera and 240 families are known to occur in the mountain. A species list from plots done at the Mutshidudi catchment area revealed 109 plant families, 397 genera and 619 species. 24 plant species are endemic to the mountain, and an additional 33 to the Vhembe Biosphere Reserve. 594 species of tree are native to the mountain or its direct vicinity. The Soutpansberg's immense floristic diversity can be attributed to several distinct floristic elements acting on it, namely Tropical, Moçambique coastal, Lowveld, Afromontane, Bushveld, Waterberg, Kalahari and Limpopo Valley. Approximately 10% of Soutpansberg plants can be considered succulent, and 32% of the endemic flora can be regarded as succulents.

Of the mountain's endemic flora, the Asclepiadaceae with 5 genera and 6 species displays a high generic diversity. Aloe presents the highest species diversity among native genera with 5 endemic species, and the monotypic Zoutpansbergia is the only endemic genus. The floral endemics include Encephalartos hirsutus, Duvalia procumbens, Euphorbia rowlandii, E. aeruginosa, E. zoutpansbergensis, Ceratotheca saxicola, Stapelia clavicorona, Tylophora coddii, Huernia nouhuysii, Aloe angelica, A. petrophila, A. soutpansbergensis, A. vossii, Combretum vendae, Blepharis spinipes, Mystacidium braybonae, Justicia montis-salinarum, Khadia borealis, Orbeanthus conjunctus, Streptocarpus parviflorus subsp. soutpansbergensis, Searsia magalismontana subsp. coddii, Vangueria soutpansbergensis and Pavetta tschikonderi.

The tropical floristic element, which reaches its southern distribution within the Soutpansberg, accounts for the species Brackenridgea zanguebarica, Millettia stuhlmannii, Oxytenanthera abyssinica, Trilepisium madagascariense, Brachystegia utilis-torrei (assimilated into a dominant B. spiciformis genome) and Syzygium masukuense. These species are not associated with the central Zimbabwean Miombo floristic element, but rather with the Eastern Highlands floristic element, and particularly its foothills.

=== Reptile diversity ===
A total of at least 116 reptile species have been recorded in the Soutpansberg. This biodiversity is remarkably high for such a small area and makes up 36% of the total number of reptile species that have been recorded in South Africa. This is roughly the same number of species (119) that occur in the Kruger National Park. The diversity is high compared to biodiversity hotspots of the world and the species diversity per unit area is higher than that of most of these hotspots. The Soutpansberg rock lizard, Soutpansberg worm lizard, Soutpansberg dwarf gecko and the Soutpansberg flat lizard are all endemic and named after this range.

=== Invertebrates ===
The Soutpansberg is known for a high level of endemism of its invertebrate fauna.

=== Conservation ===
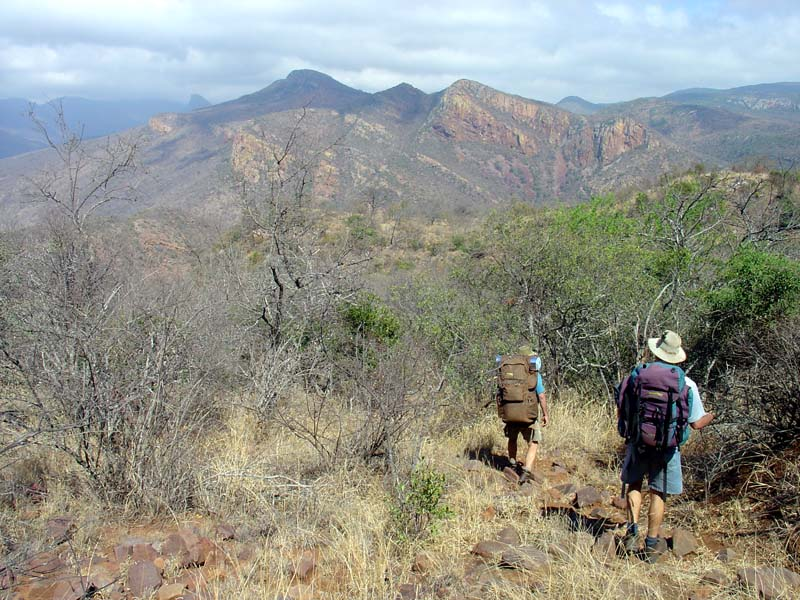
Hikers in the central Soutpansberg

In today's world, natural areas are under a lot of pressure from human activity. Exploitation of natural resources, human encroachment due to expanding developments, poaching and general pollution – these all affect the Soutpansberg in some way. At the moment the mountains are a World Heritage Site and they form part of the newly proclaimed Vhembe Biosphere reserve.

== Gallery ==
Organisms endemic to the Soutpansberg

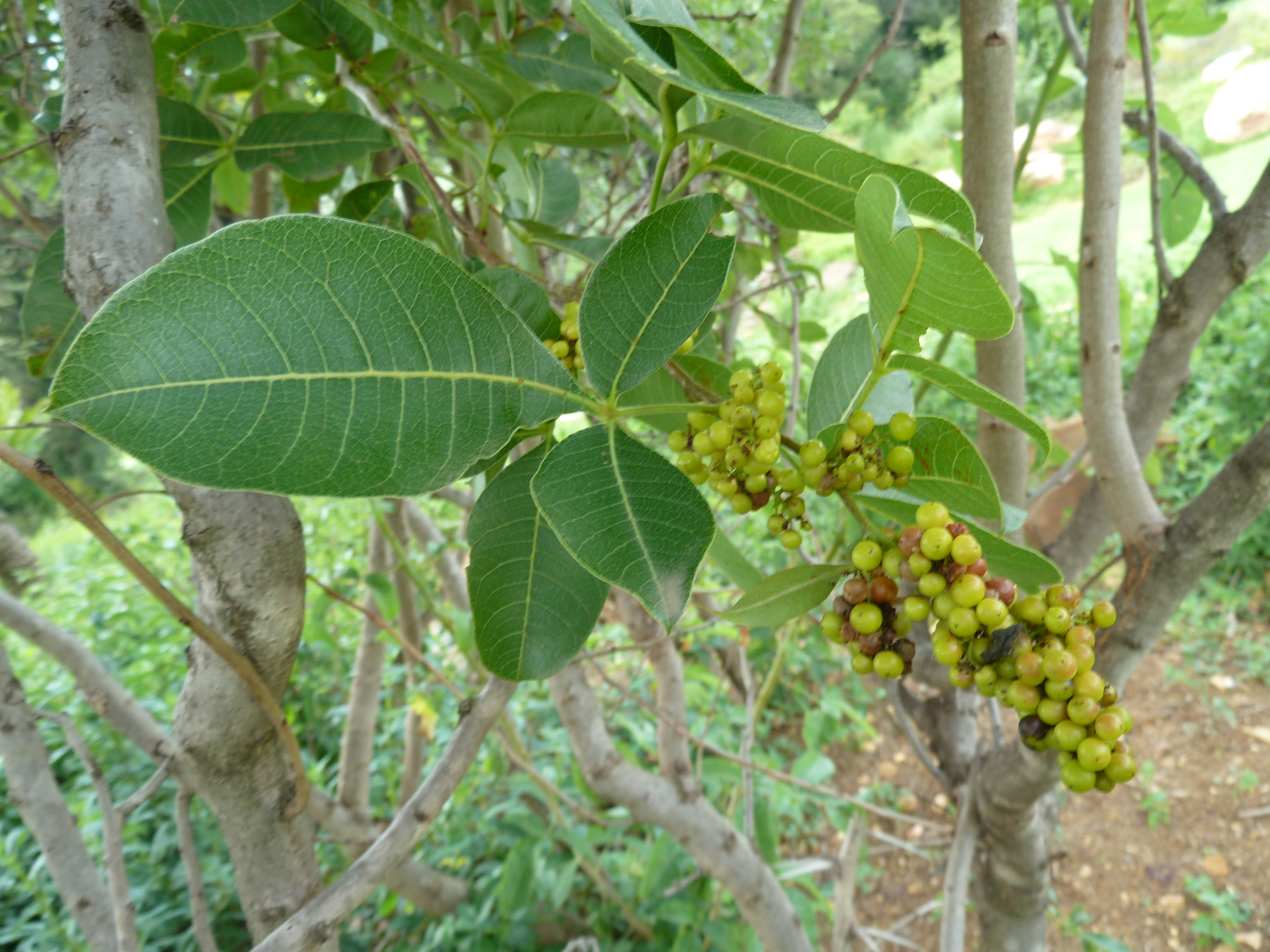
Searsia magalismontana subsp. coddii

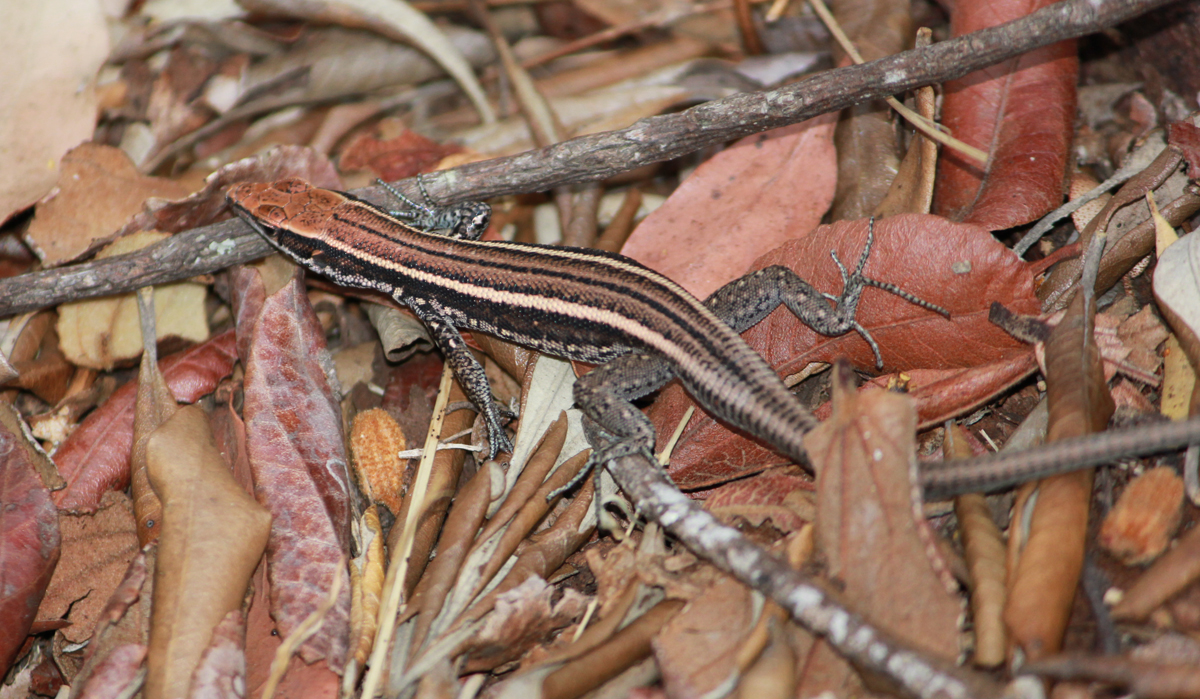
Soutpansberg rock lizard, Vhembelacerta rupicola

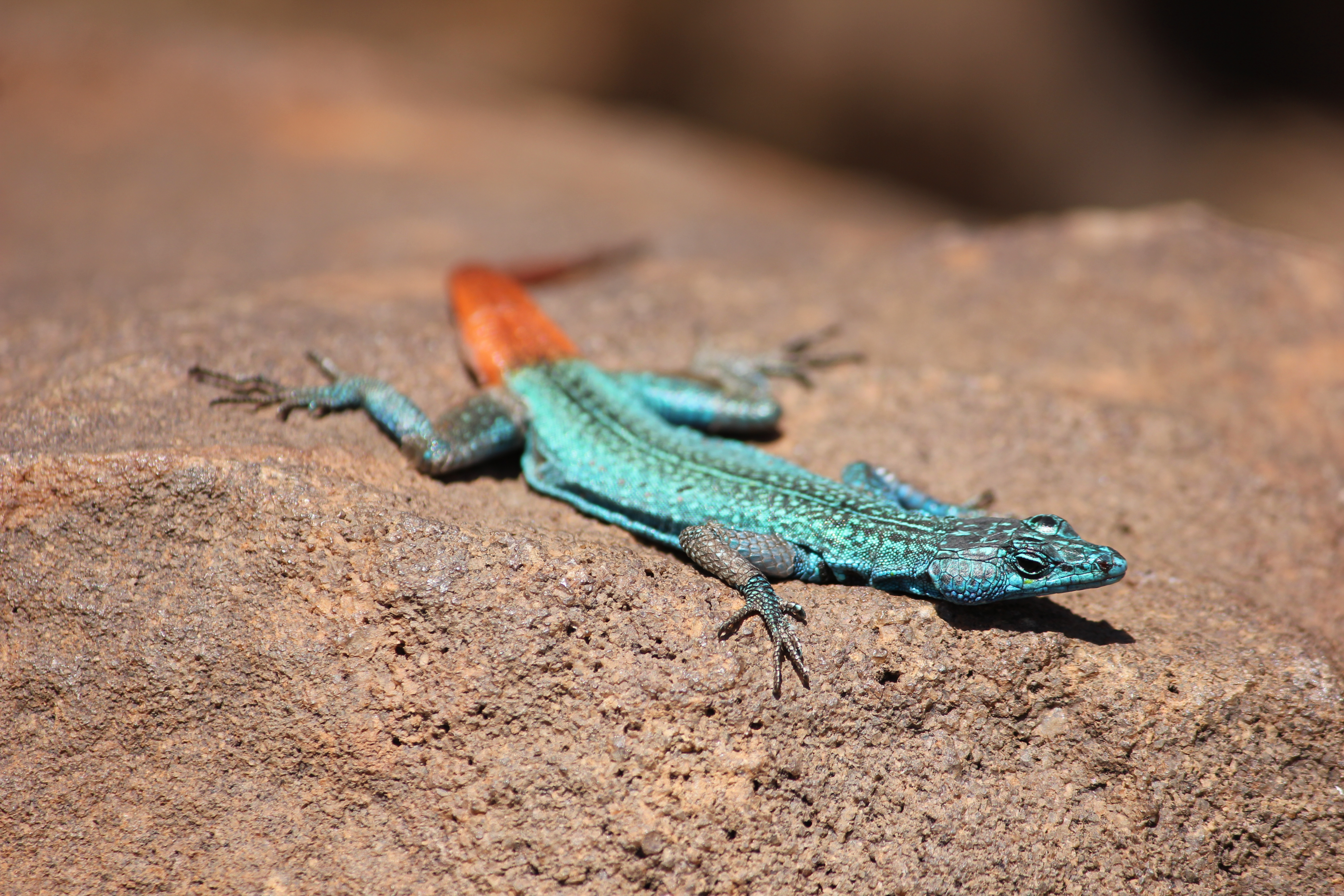
A male Soutpansberg flat lizard, Platysaurus relictus

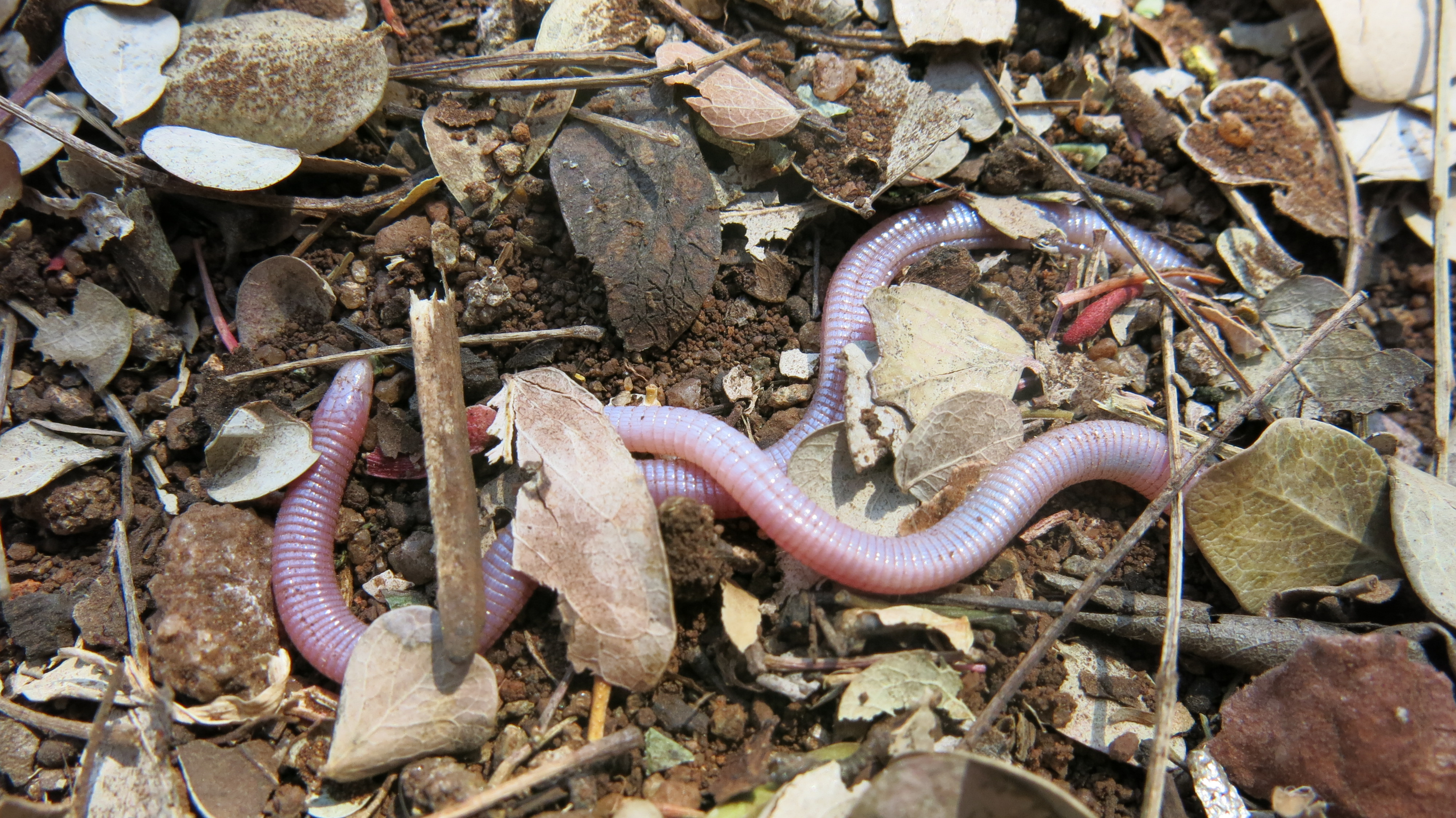
The endemic Soutpansberg worm lizard, Chirindia langi subsp. occidentalis

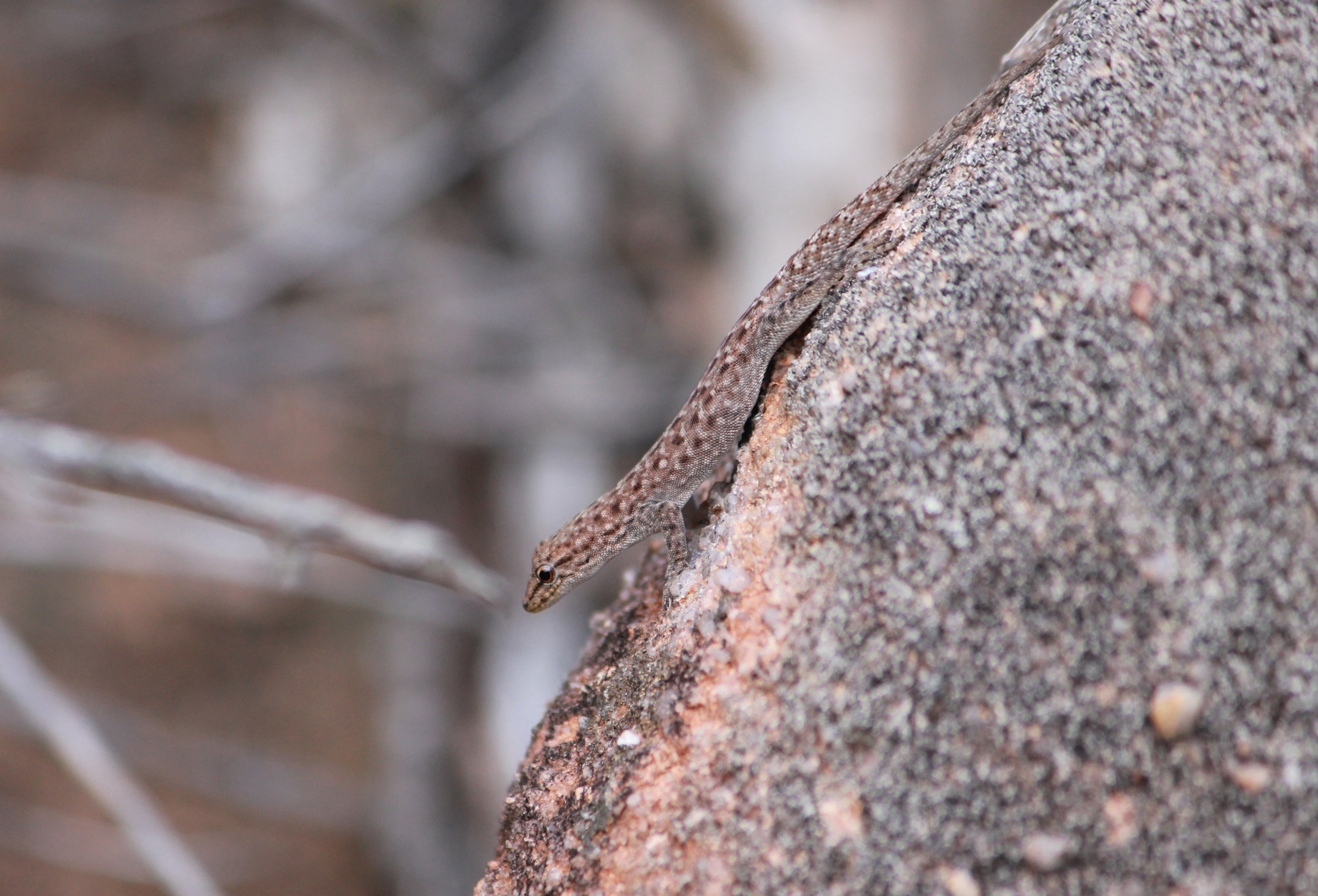
Lygodactylus ocellatus soutpansbergensis, a gecko endemic to the Soutpansberg

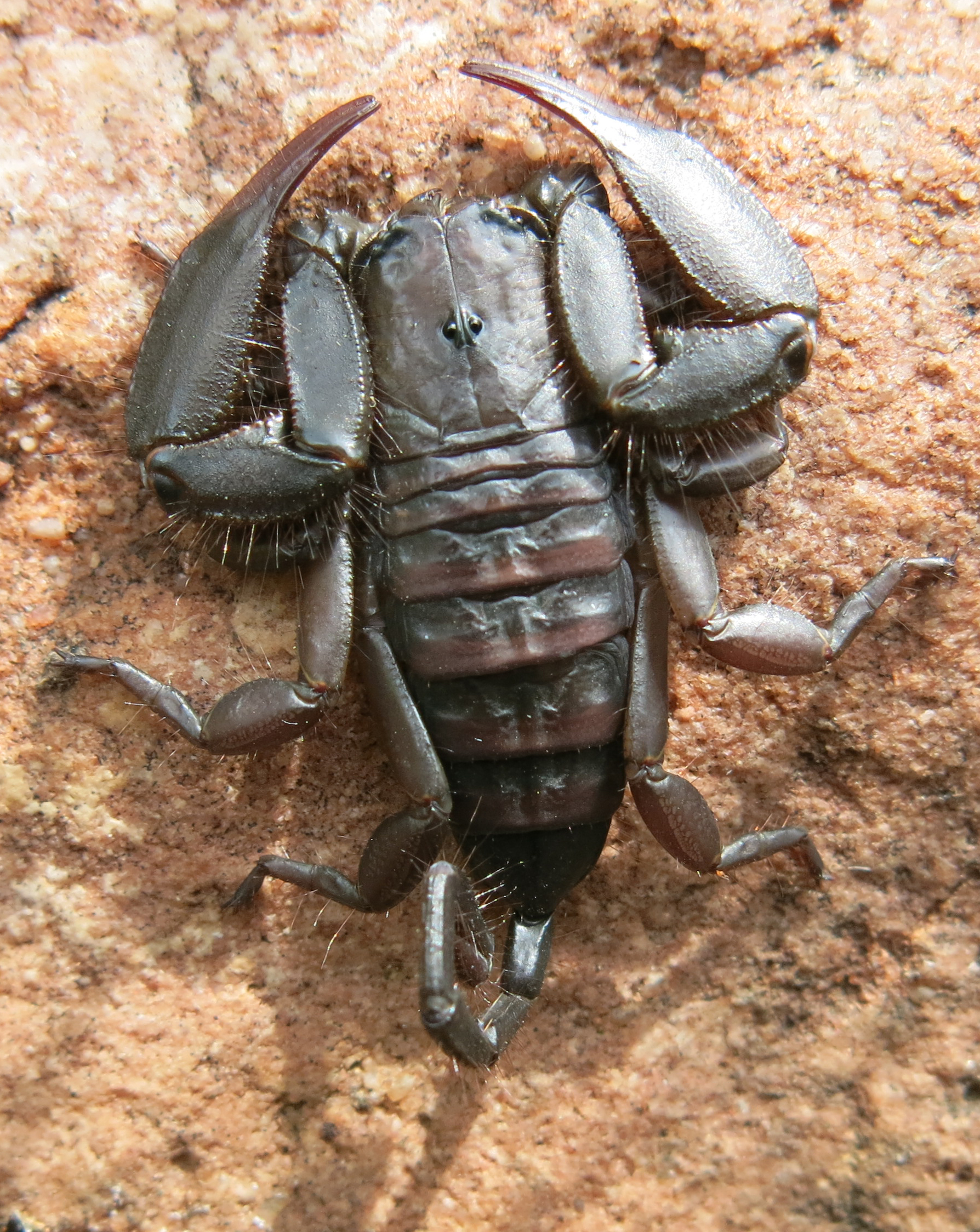
Hadogenes soutpansbergensis, a scorpion endemic to the Soutpansberg

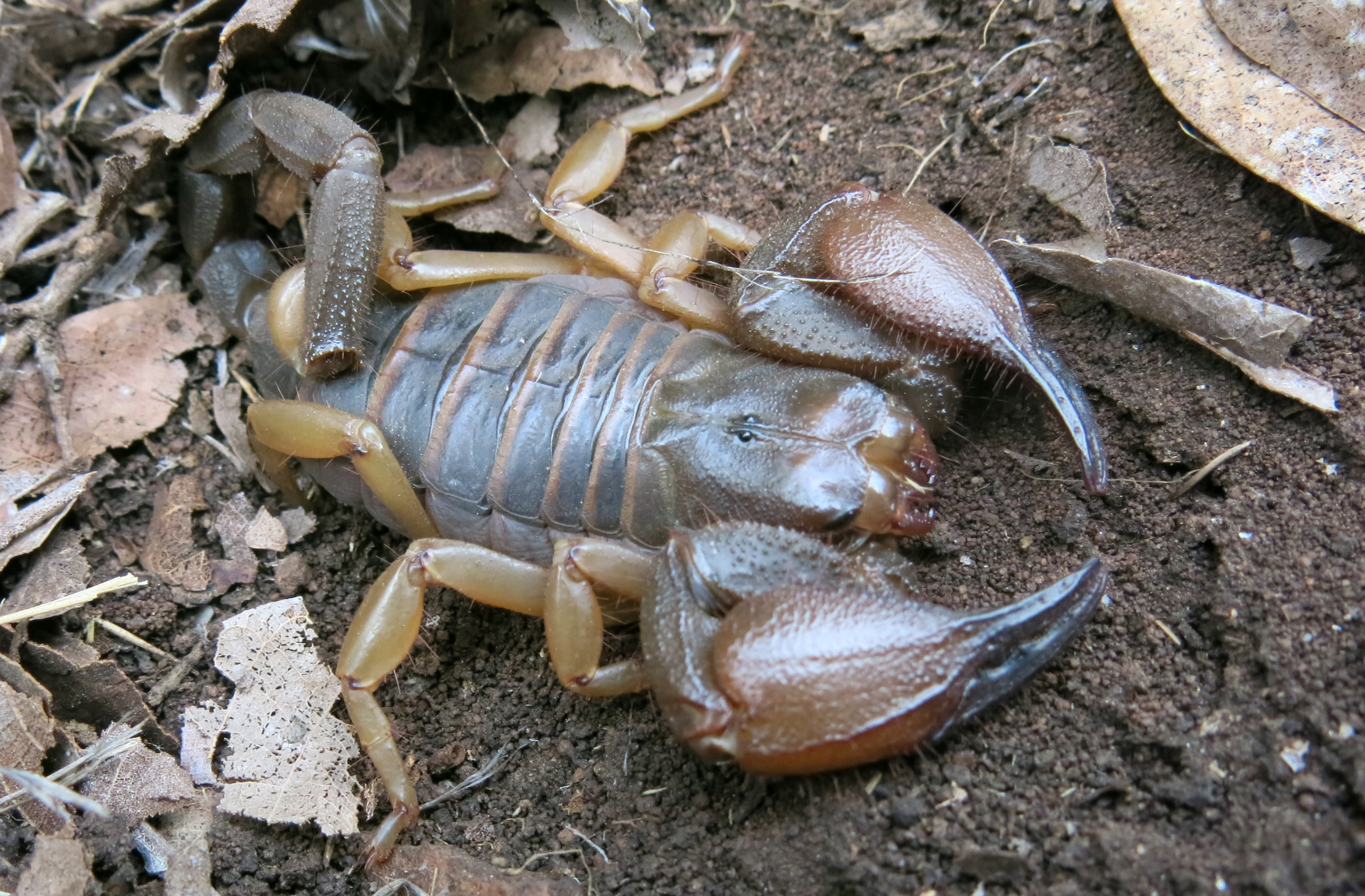
Opistophthalmus lawrencei, a scorpion endemic to the Soutpansberg

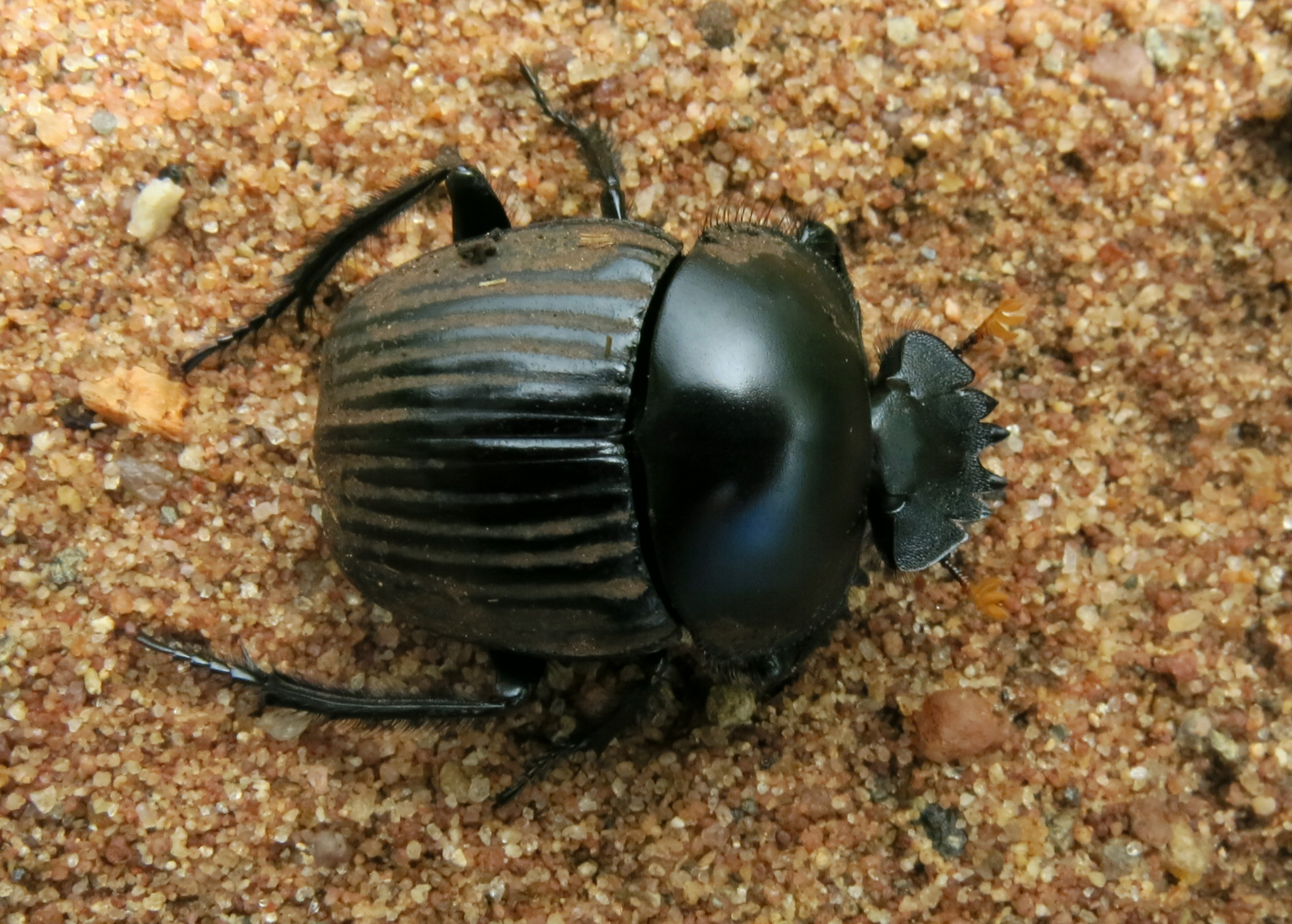
Soutpansberg dung beetle, Scarabaeus schulzeae, a Soutpansberg endemic

== See also ==
- Lajumawaterval
- List of mountain ranges of South Africa
- Nwanedi Provincial Park
- Soutpansberg Conservancy
