= Nwanedi River =

- Location of the Nwanedi River mouth
- Etymology: No known meaning

Location
- Country: South Africa
- State: Limpopo Province

Physical characteristics
- Source
  - location: Soutpansberg
  - elevation: 1,160 m (3,810 ft)
- Mouth
  - location: Limpopo River, South Africa/Zimbabwe border
  - coordinates: 22°20′0″S 30°36′53″E
  - elevation: 344 m (1,129 ft)

Basin features
- Tributaries
  - right: Luphephe River

The Nwanedi River is a watercourse in Limpopo Province, South Africa. It is a tributary of the Limpopo River flowing east of the Nzhelele, joining the right bank of the Limpopo 58 km east of Musina at the South Africa/Zimbabwe border.

== Course ==
The Nwanedi river collects part of the drainage of the northern slopes of the extensive rock formation of the Soutpansberg. The upper Nwanedi is a perennial stream with twin dams where it is met by its tributary, the Luphephe River, in a wooded area of the range. Leaving the mountainous Soutpansberg area, it meanders in a northeastward direction across the Lowveld. This lower part is subject to seasonal fluctuations, being mostly dry during periods of drought, with a few disconnected ponds in the riverbed. There have been problems of surface water contamination of the river in the recent past.

The Luphephe River, its main tributary, rises also in the Soutpansberg, further east from the sources of the Nwanedi.

The Nwanedi Provincial Park is located about 35 km north of Thohoyandou, in a wooded area on the foothills of the Soutpansberg. The protected area includes the confluence of the Nwanedi and its main tributary, the Luphephe River, where the dams are. The park's area is 11,170 ha and it is well stocked with game.

The Nwanedi river should not be confused with the Nwanedzi, or Nwanedsi River a tributary of the Letaba River.

== Dams in the basin ==
- Cross Dam
- Nwanedi Dam
- Luphephe Dam, in the Luphephe River, a tributary of the Nwanedi

== See also ==
- Drainage basin A
- Limpopo Water Management Area
- List of rivers of South Africa
- Nwanedi Provincial Park
