= R508 (South Africa) =

Regional route in South Africa

Regional route R508

Route information
- Length: 36 km (22 mi)

Major junctions
- North end: N1 at Musina
- South end: R525 at Tshipise

Location
- Country: South Africa

Highway system
- Numbered routes of South Africa
← R507	→ R509

The R508 is a Regional Route in South Africa that connects Musina with Tshipise.

== Route ==
It begins in Musina, Limpopo and runs south-south-east to for 36 kilometres the village of Tshipise where it ends at a junction with the R525.
