= R525 road =

R525 road may refer to:

- R525 road (Ireland)
- R525 (South Africa)
