= Lauren Liebenberg =

South African writer

- Born: 3 August 1972 (age 54); Rhodesia
- Occupation: Writer
- Writing career
- Notable works: The Voluptuous Delights of Peanut Butter and Jam The West Rand Jive Cats Boxing Club Cry Baby

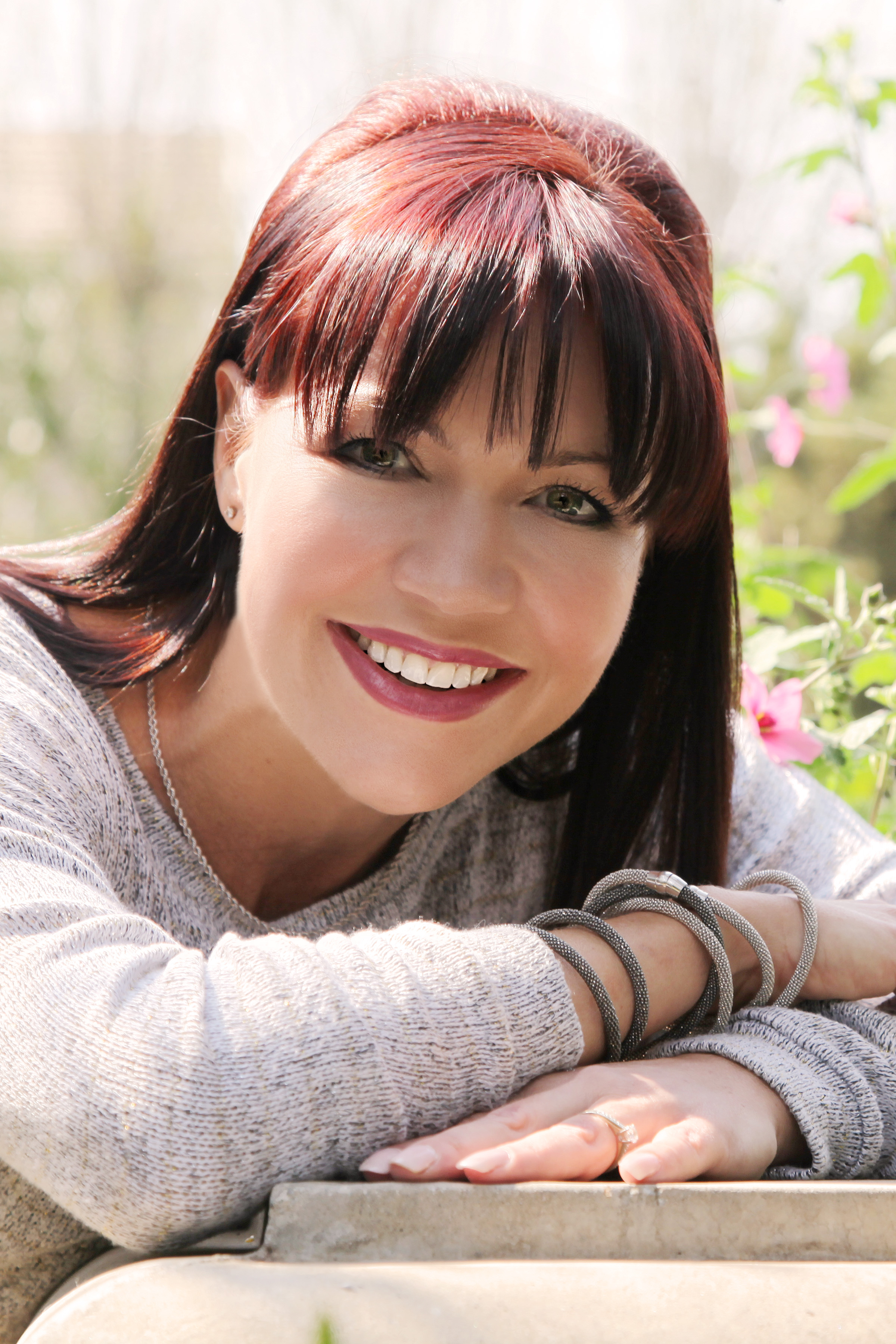

Lauren Liebenberg (born 3 August 1972) is a Rhodesian-born South African writer and environmental activist. Her debut novel, The Voluptuous Delights of Peanut Butter and Jam, was nominated for the Women's Prize for Fiction in 2008. Her subsequent novels, The West Rand Jive Cats Boxing Club and Cry Baby, also received international critical acclaim. She is prominent in environmental and social justice advocacy in South Africa.

== Background ==
Liebenberg was born in Rhodesia, however her family would emigrate to South Africa when she was eight after the takeover of the country by Robert Mugabe's ZANU in 1980. She attended Brescia House, a Catholic school for girls in Johannesburg. After completing her undergraduate degree at the University of South Africa, she lived in England for some years, before returning to South Africa, where she graduated from the business school of the University of the Witwatersrand with a master's degree in business (MBA). She worked in investment banking in South Africa and published in the field of financial markets.

Her debut novel, The Voluptuous Delights of Peanut Butter and Jam which drew upon her experiences as a child in former Rhodesia during the Rhodesian Bush War, garnered much attention from critics when it was published in 2008. The Guardian described it as "astonishingly vivid", going on to say that "Rhodesia springs to fecund, fetid life before your eyes ... like the children at its heart ... it’s immediate, rarely judgmental ... charming, upsetting and poignantly strange ... burrowing deep under your skin". The Financial Times described it as an "elegiac first novel [that] captures the insular vulnerability of this white African childhood." The Times described it as a "touching debut". The novel was also serialized by The Independent. More recent academic literary critiques regard the novel as an exploration of post-colonial trauma in Zimbabwe, depicting "a nation left behind, stagnant in its repressive measures and unable to move forward", suggesting that "the colonial past and violent present of Zimbabwe cannot be reconciled".

Apart from being longlisted for the Women's Prize for Fiction, Liebenberg was one of only three women to be shortlisted for the Orange debut prize in 2008. In 2010, the novel was longlisted for the International Dublin Literary Award.

Her follow-up novel, The West Rand Jive Cats Boxing Club, a coming-of-age story set in the gold-fields of Johannesburg, was published in 2011, and also drew warm praise from critics. The Guardian said the novel had "a true, raw feel about it" and described Liebenberg as a "terrific writer". The Times called it "moving ... [an] excellently crafted story" and The Financial Times hailed it as "vivid ... evocative ... and compelling". Cry Baby her third and latest novel, a satire on contemporary suburbia with a strong feminist theme, was published in February 2014. Liebenberg is married with two children and lives in Johannesburg, South Africa.

In later years Liebenberg has become active in the environmental movement and the conservation sector in South Africa. She serves on the board of the UNESCO MAB Vhembe Biosphere Reserve and the Philip Herd Nature Reserve, Limpopo Province, South Africa, and is the founder of Living Limpopo, an environmental advocacy non-profit organization that campaigns against coal mining and industrialization in the biosphere, and promotes biodiversity conservation and expansion of the Transfrontier Conservation Area (TFCA) of Mapungubwe and Great Limpopo. She co-authored the Academy of Science South Africa (ASSAf) Scientific Group for Emergencies (SAGE) Advisory on the environmental and cultural heritage impacts of the Musina-Makhado Special Economic Zone in South Africa's Limpopo Province . Her recent writing has concentrated on environmental economics themes

== Bibliography ==
- The Electronic Financial Markets of the Future and Survival Strategies of the Broker-Dealers by Lauren Liebenberg (Palgrave Macmillan, 2002) ISBN 978-0-33399-860-1
- The Voluptuous Delights of Peanut Butter and Jam by Lauren Liebenberg (Virago Press, 2008) ISBN 1-84408-464-7
- The West Rand Jive Cats Boxing Club by Lauren Liebenberg (Virago Press, 2010) ISBN 1-84408-489-2
- Cry Baby by Lauren Liebenberg (Penguin Books, 2014) ISBN 978-0-14353-861-5
