= Hanglip =

Mountain in Limpopo, South Africa

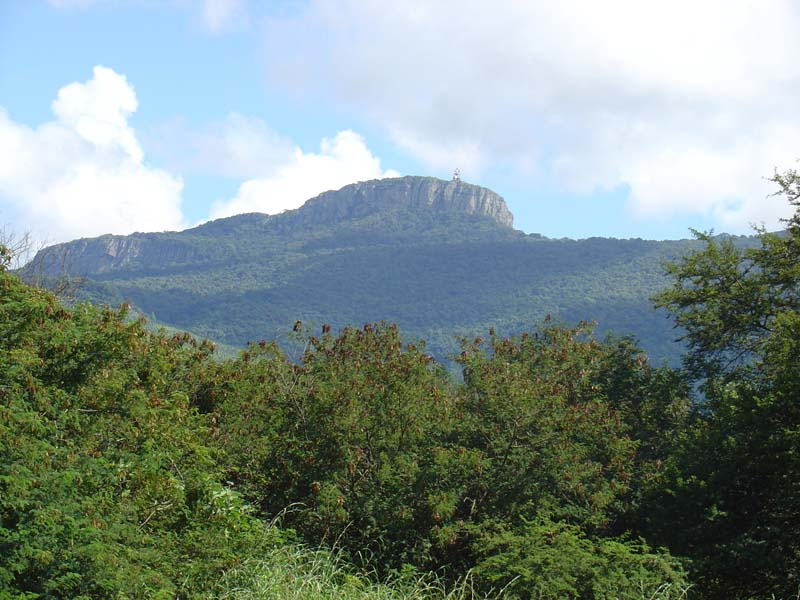
- Hanglip from the southeast

Highest point
- Elevation: 1,719 m (5,640 ft)
- Listing: List of mountains in South Africa
- Coordinates: 22°59′45″S 29°53′0″E

Geography
- Location within South Africa
- Location: Limpopo
- Parent range: Soutpansberg

Hanglip (Afrikaans for hanging lip, Venda: Songozwi- thavha khulu ya VhaDzanani) is a prominent mountain peak near Louis Trichardt, South Africa. It is situated in the Vhembe District of Limpopo in the central Soutpansberg range. The peak with radar station, at 1,719 meters a.s.l., forms a conspicuous landmark visible from the town and the N1 national road.

== History ==
Hanglip is situated in the 354 hectare Hanglip Forest Reserve within the Hanglip State Forest. The state forest contains commercial pine plantations, protected natural forest and bushveld. The pine plantations are harvested in 30 to 40 year cycles for construction wood.

Geologically, the mountain consists of tilted layers of the Karoo succession including glacial till deposits. Red quartzite deposits and grey andesite lava intrusions are also present.

Fort Botha was established under Hanglip some kilometers southwest of Mphephu's kraal. The ruins of the fort are currently off limits, being situated near graves of the Singos and the sacred site of vhaDzanani on the other side. The town of Trichardtsdorp was established after the conflict. The Hanglip Forest Reserve is a protected area in the zone of the mountain.

Hikers can arrange to overnight in the Hanglip trail hut east of the peak, and motorists can visit a picnic site against its southern slope.

== See also ==
- List of castles and fortifications in South Africa
