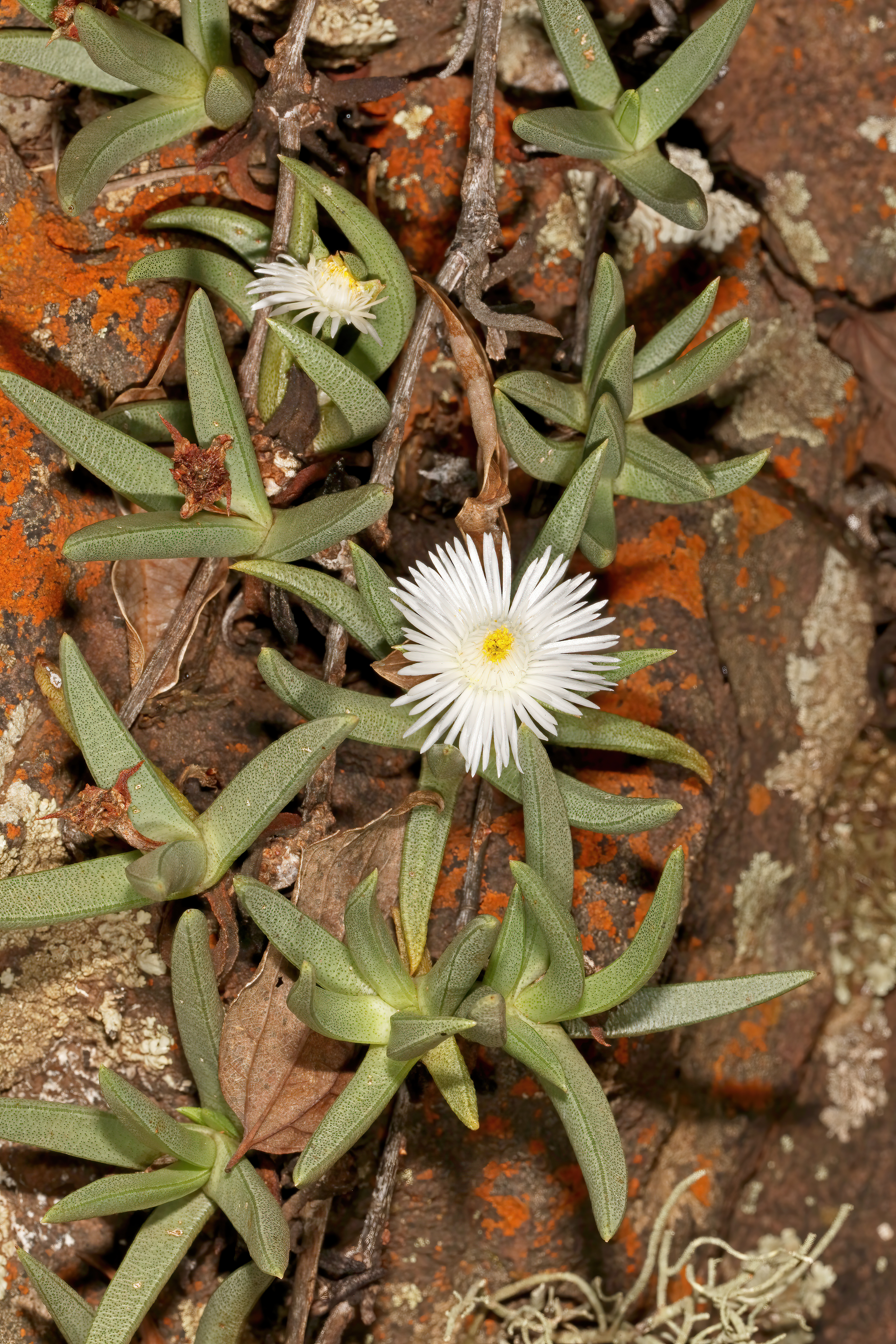

Scientific classification
- Kingdom: Plantae
- Clade: Tracheophytes
- Clade: Angiosperms
- Clade: Eudicots
- Order: Caryophyllales
- Family: Aizoaceae
- Genus: Khadia
- Species: K. borealis

Binomial name
- Khadia borealis L.Bolus

= Khadia borealis =

Species of succulent

Khadia borealis is a succulent plant belonging to the Aizoaceae family. The species is endemic to South Africa and occurs in Limpopo, on the summit of the Soutpansberg, from Lejuma to Mavhode. The plant has a range of 900 km^{2} and ten subpopulations are known; however, the species is considered rare.
