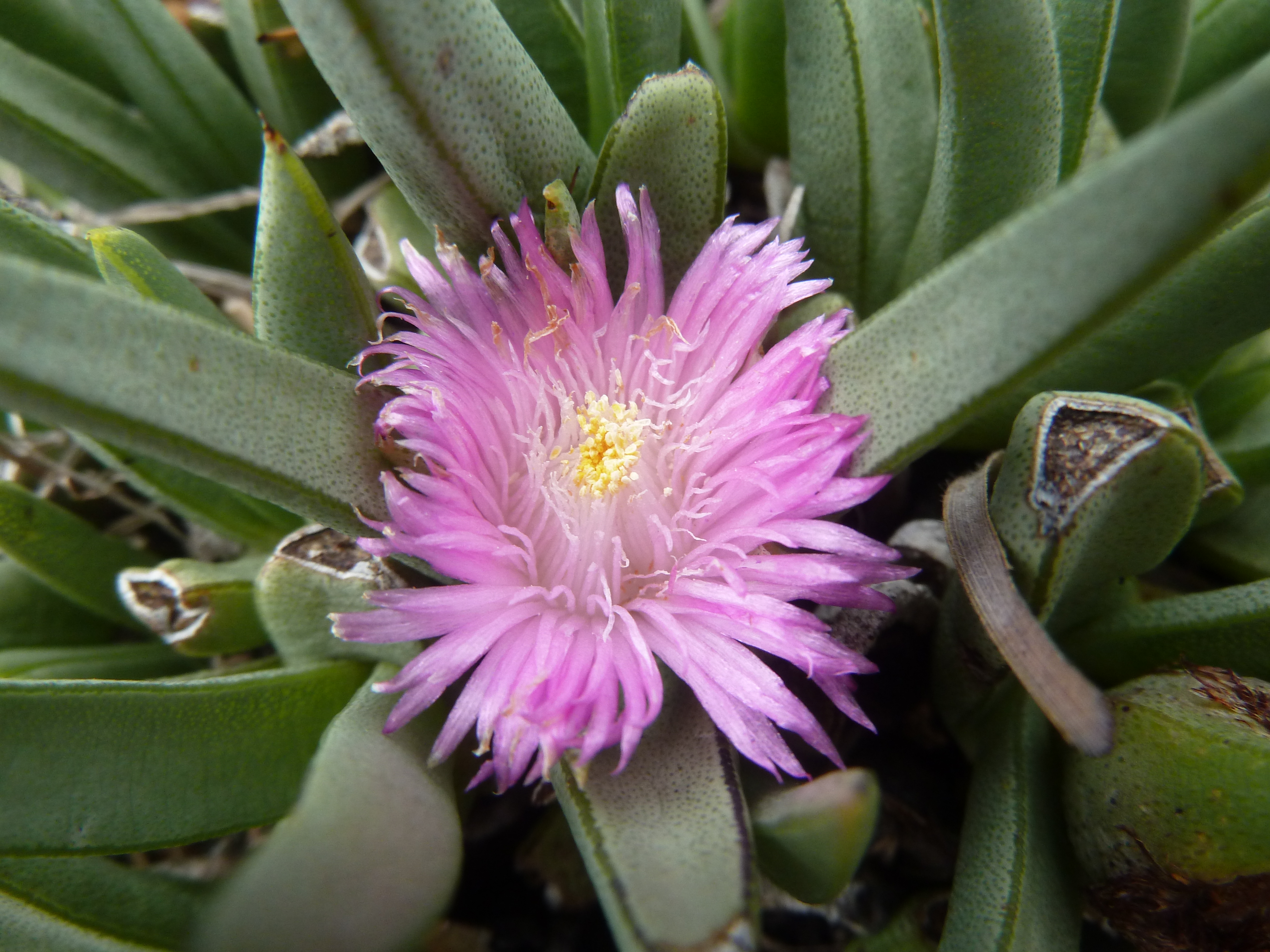

Scientific classification
- Kingdom: Plantae
- Clade: Tracheophytes
- Clade: Angiosperms
- Clade: Eudicots
- Order: Caryophyllales
- Family: Aizoaceae
- Genus: Khadia
- Species: K. acutipetala

Binomial name
- Khadia acutipetala (N.E.Br.) N.E.Br.

Synonyms
- Khadia nationae (N.E.Br.) N.E.Br.; Mesembryanthemum acutipetalum N.E.Br.; Mesembryanthemum nationae N.E.Br.

= Khadia acutipetala =

Species of succulent

Khadia acutipetala is a succulent plant that is part of the Aizoaceae family. The species is endemic to South Africa and occurs in Gauteng and the North West provinces.
