= Khadia carolinensis =

Scientific classification
- Kingdom: Plantae
- Clade: Tracheophytes
- Clade: Angiosperms
- Clade: Eudicots
- Order: Caryophyllales
- Family: Aizoaceae
- Genus: Khadia
- Species: K. carolinensis

Binomial name
- Khadia carolinensis (L.Bolus) L.Bolus

Synonyms
- Mesembryanthemum carolinense L.Bolus; Rabiea carolinensis (L.Bolus) N.E.Br.

Species of succulent

Khadia carolinensis is a succulent plant that is part of the Aizoaceae family. The species is endemic to South Africa and occurs in Mpumalanga from Carolina to Belfast. There is coal under the sandstone in which the plant grows but this has not had a major impact on the species to date. However, several applications for mining licenses have been submitted in the past five years. It is expected that if open pit mining activities begin, 45% of the species' habitat will be lost in ten to twenty years.
