= Soutpansberg Conservancy =

South African protected area

- Location within Limpopo Location within South Africa
- Location: Limpopo, South Africa
- Nearest city: Louis Trichardt
- Coordinates: 22°58′30″S 29°34′0″E
- Area: 90,000 ha (220,000 acres)
- Governing body: Limpopo Provincial Government

Soutpansberg Conservancy, also known as Western Soutpansberg Conservancy, is a protected area situated in the northern part of the Limpopo province of South Africa. The reserve has an area of about 90,000 Ha and consists mostly in the mountainous terrain of the western part of the Soutpansberg Range. The Brak River, a tributary of the Sand River, flows beyond the western end of the Soutpansberg Conservancy. The Waterpoort, the deep gorge cut by the Sand River across the range is located in the central part of the protected area.

The Soutpansberg or "Tha vhani ya muno" (mountain of salt) is in the traditional area of the Venda people. It is rich in plant diversity with yellowwood trees, twelve acacia species, including fever trees, giant cabbage trees, proteas and ancient tree ferns. The rocky summits are a haven for birds of prey and large mammals such as leopards are found in some areas.

== See also ==
- Protected areas of South Africa
