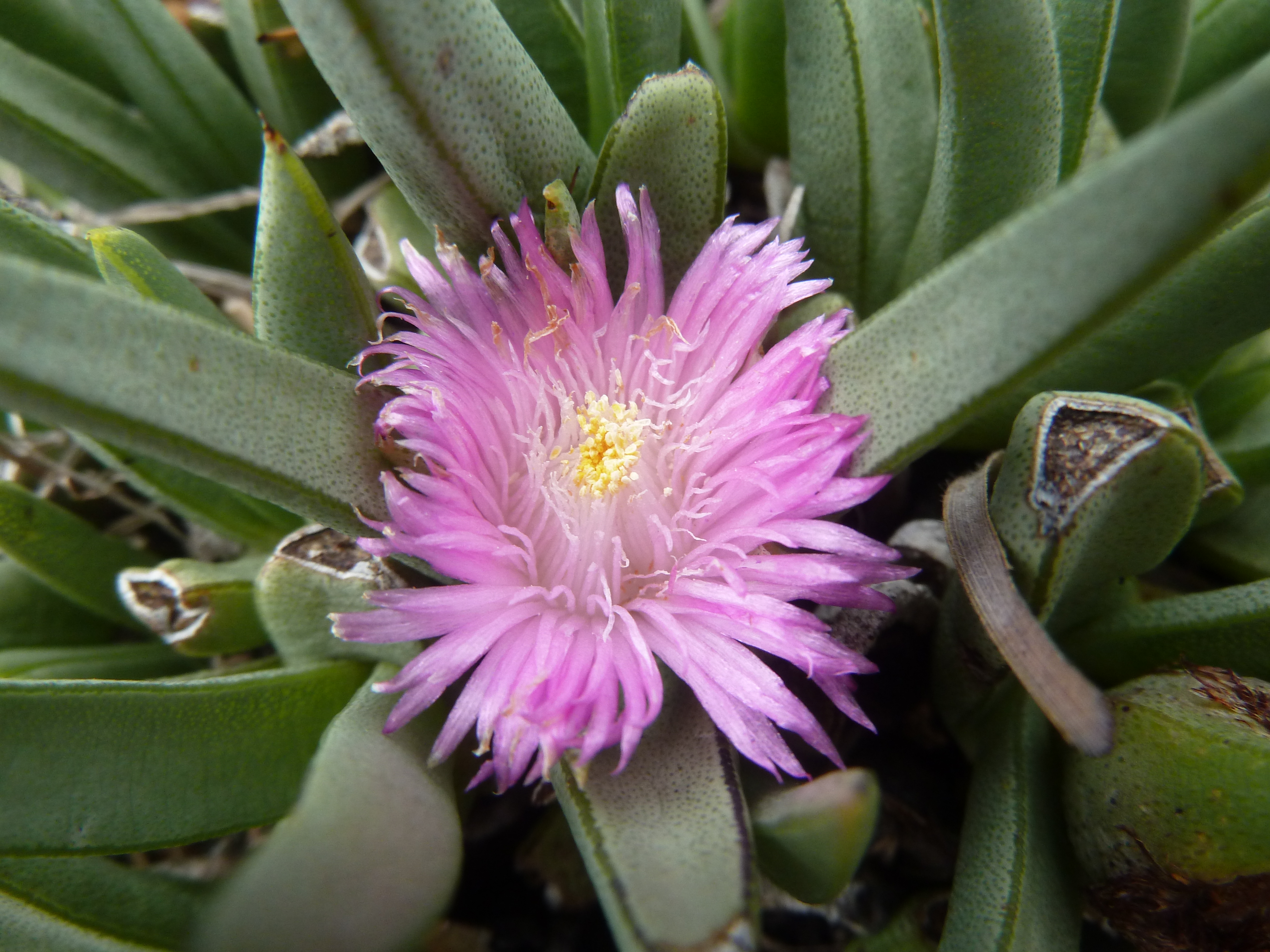
- Khadia acutipetala

Scientific classification
- Kingdom: Plantae
- Clade: Tracheophytes
- Clade: Angiosperms
- Clade: Eudicots
- Order: Caryophyllales
- Family: Aizoaceae
- Subfamily: Ruschioideae
- Tribe: Ruschieae
- Genus: Khadia; N.E.Br. (1930)

= Khadia =

Genus of succulents

Khadia is a genus of plants in the family Aizoaceae. It includes six species native to the Free State, Northern Provinces, and KwaZulu-Natal in South Africa.

== Species ==
Six species are accepted:

- Khadia acutipetala (N.E.Br.) N.E.Br.
- Khadia alticola Chess. & H.E.K.Hartmann
- Khadia beswickii (L.Bolus) N.E.Br.
- Khadia borealis L.Bolus
- Khadia carolinensis (L.Bolus) L.Bolus
- Khadia media P.J.D.Winter & N.Hahn
