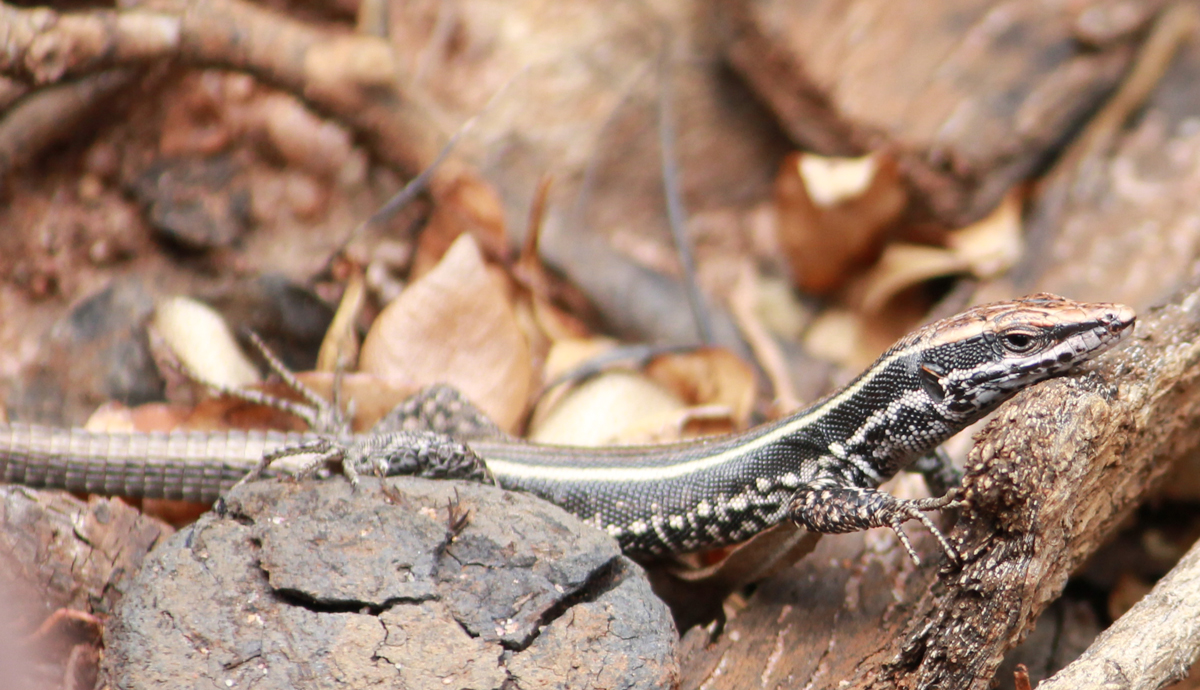
- in Medike, Soutpansberg

Conservation status
- Least Concern (IUCN 3.1)

Scientific classification
- Kingdom: Animalia
- Phylum: Chordata
- Class: Reptilia
- Order: Squamata
- Family: Lacertidae
- Genus: Vhembelacerta; Edwards, Herrel, Vanhooydonck, Measey, Tolley, & Branch, 2013
- Species: V. rupicola

Binomial name
- Vhembelacerta rupicola (FitzSimons, 1933)

Synonyms
- Lacerta rupicola Fitzsimons, 1933; Australolacerta rupicola Kirchhof, 2010; Vhembelacerta rupicola Edwards, 2013

= Soutpansberg rock lizard =

Species of lizard

The Soutpansberg rock lizard (Vhembelacerta rupicola) is a small (40–50 mm) flattened species of lizard in the family Lacertidae. It has been described as a diurnal, rock-dwelling species inhabiting scree and rocky outcrops at altitudes from 900 to 1600 m. It is endemic to the Limpopo Province in the north of South Africa.

It is an active forager on the southern slopes of the Soutpansberg hills.

== Etymology ==
The species name "rupicola" means rock-inhabiting as this lizard is quite strictly saxicolous when compared to other species in the area like Trachylepis varia.

The first part of the genus name "Vhembe-" refers to the Vhembe region of Limpopo Province where the species is endemic. The second part of the name, "lacerta", refers to the Latin name for lizard, it also retains the historical link to the genus Lacerta to which the species was originally described.
