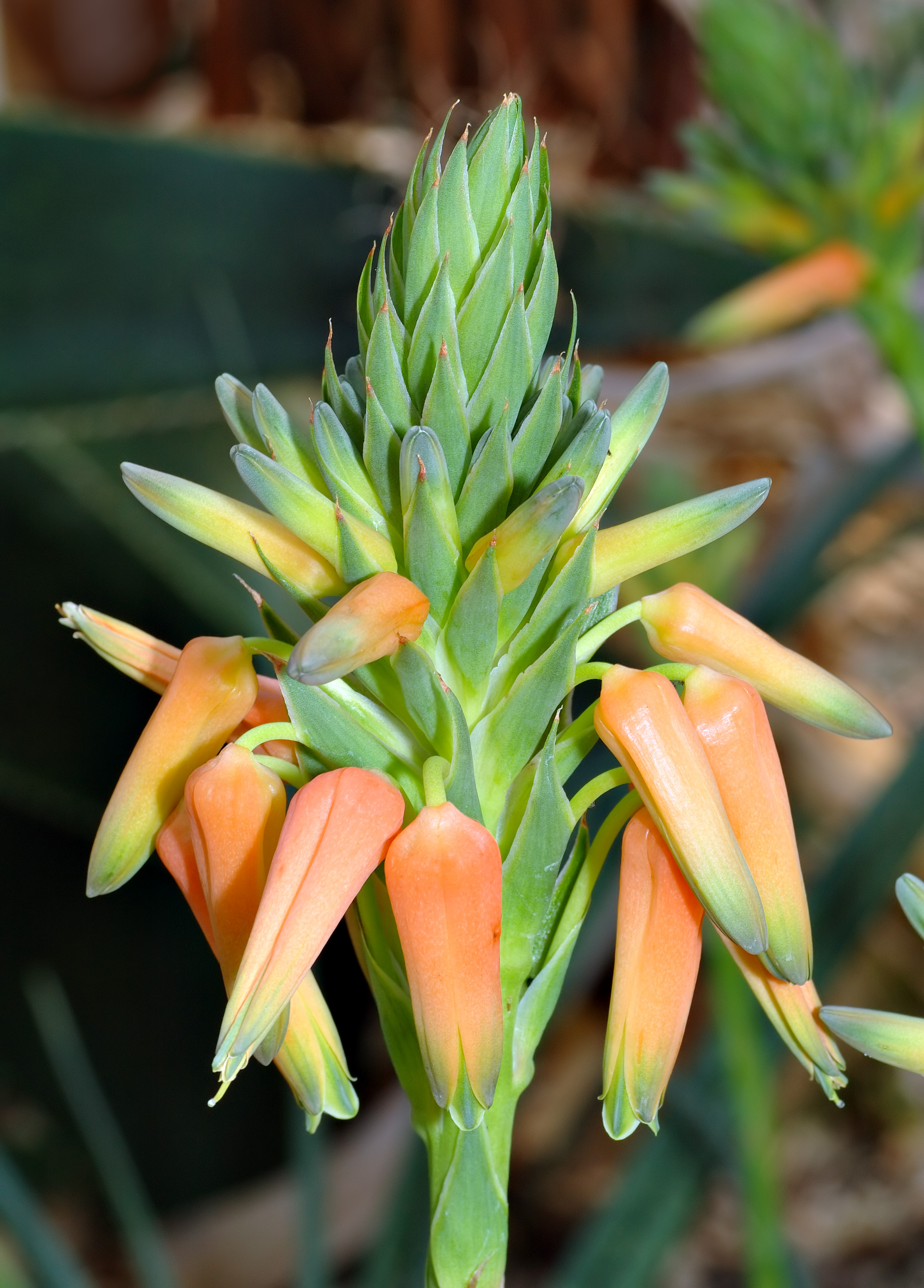

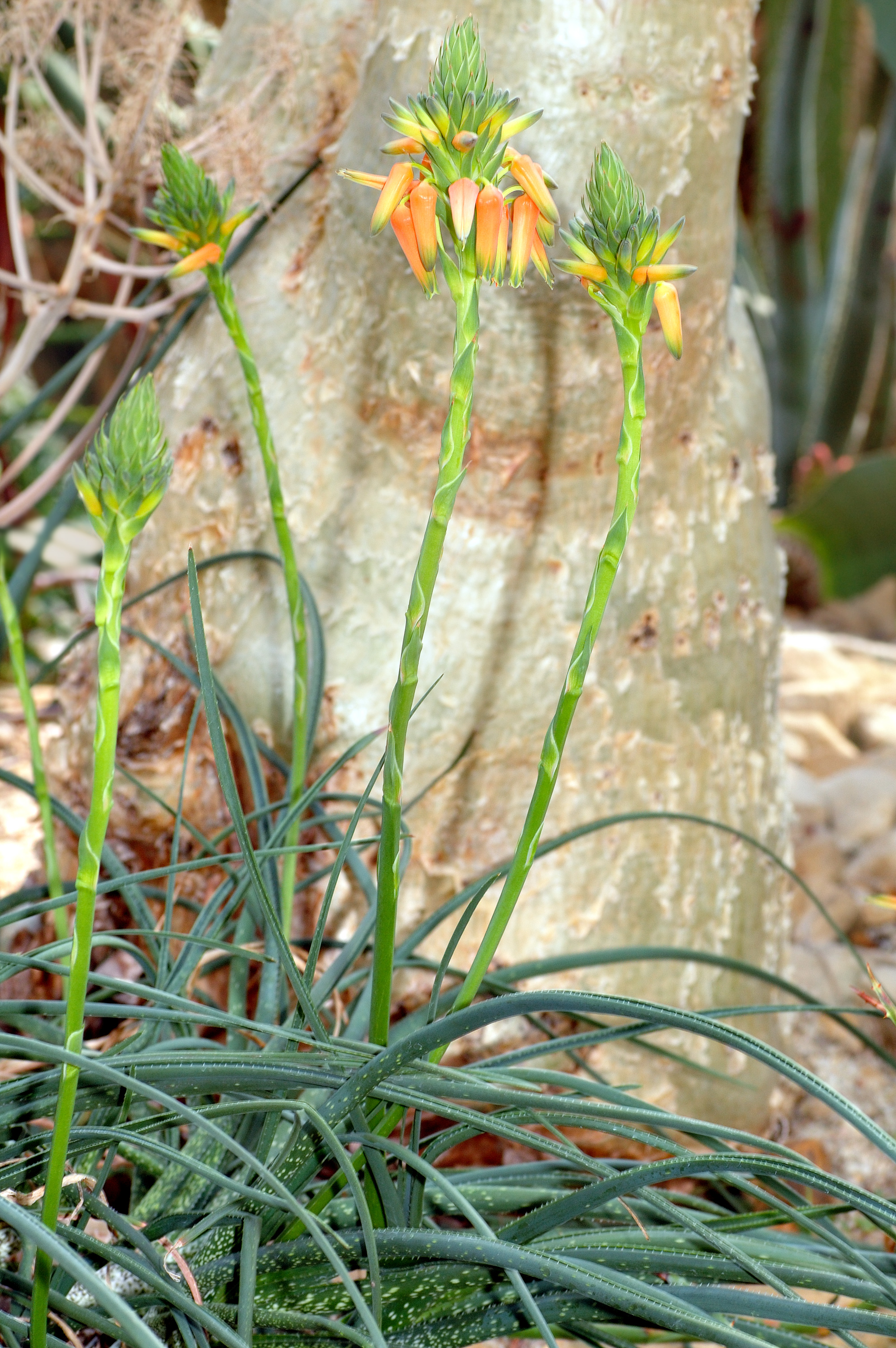

Conservation status
- CITES Appendix I (CITES)

Scientific classification
- Kingdom: Plantae
- Clade: Tracheophytes
- Clade: Angiosperms
- Clade: Monocots
- Order: Asparagales
- Family: Asphodelaceae
- Subfamily: Asphodeloideae
- Genus: Aloe
- Species: A. vossii

Binomial name
- Aloe vossii Reynolds

= Aloe vossii =

Species of succulent

Aloe vossii is a plant that belongs to the genus Aloe that is part of the Asphodelaceae family. The species is endemic to the Soutpansberg in Limpopo.
