= Khadia alticola =

Scientific classification
- Kingdom: Plantae
- Clade: Tracheophytes
- Clade: Angiosperms
- Clade: Eudicots
- Order: Caryophyllales
- Family: Aizoaceae
- Genus: Khadia
- Species: K. alticola

Binomial name
- Khadia alticola Chess. & H.E.K.Hartmann

Species of succulent

Khadia alticola is a succulent plant that is part of the Aizoaceae family. The species is endemic to South Africa. It is found in KwaZulu-Natal and Mpumalanga at the Steenkampsberg, Utrecht and Wakkerstroom. The plant is considered rare.
