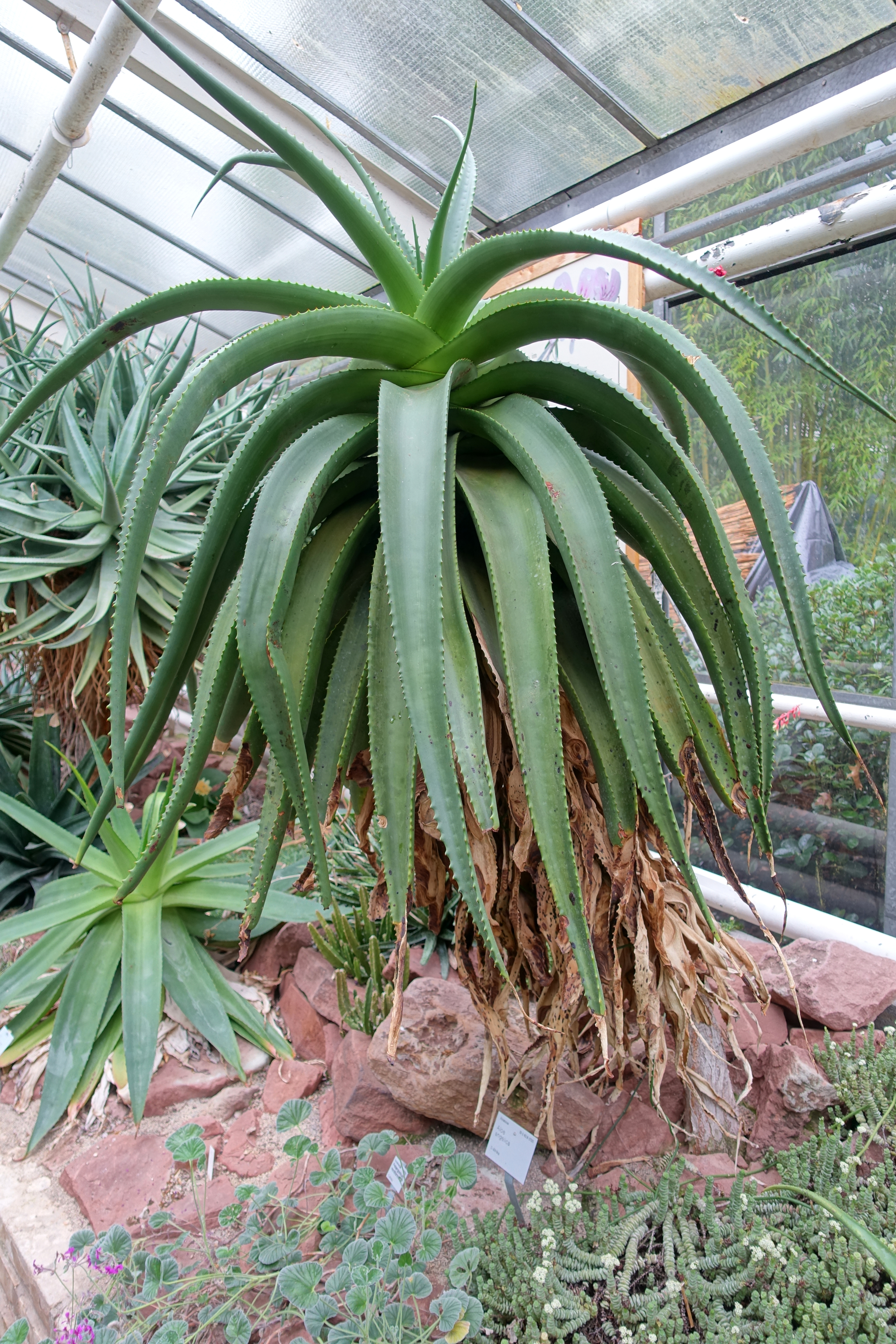

Conservation status
- CITES Appendix II (CITES)

Scientific classification
- Kingdom: Plantae
- Clade: Tracheophytes
- Clade: Angiosperms
- Clade: Monocots
- Order: Asparagales
- Family: Asphodelaceae
- Subfamily: Asphodeloideae
- Genus: Aloe
- Species: A. angelica

Binomial name
- Aloe angelica Pole-Evans

= Aloe angelica =

Species of succulent

Aloe angelica (Wylliespoort Aloe) is a species of aloe endemic to the Soutpansberg and Blouberg mountains in the Northern Province of South Africa. It is a large, single-stemmed plant, 3–4 meters in height, with green, succulent leaves, bent backward, and red-budded flowers in compact bunches on much-branched racemes, turning yellow as they flower.
