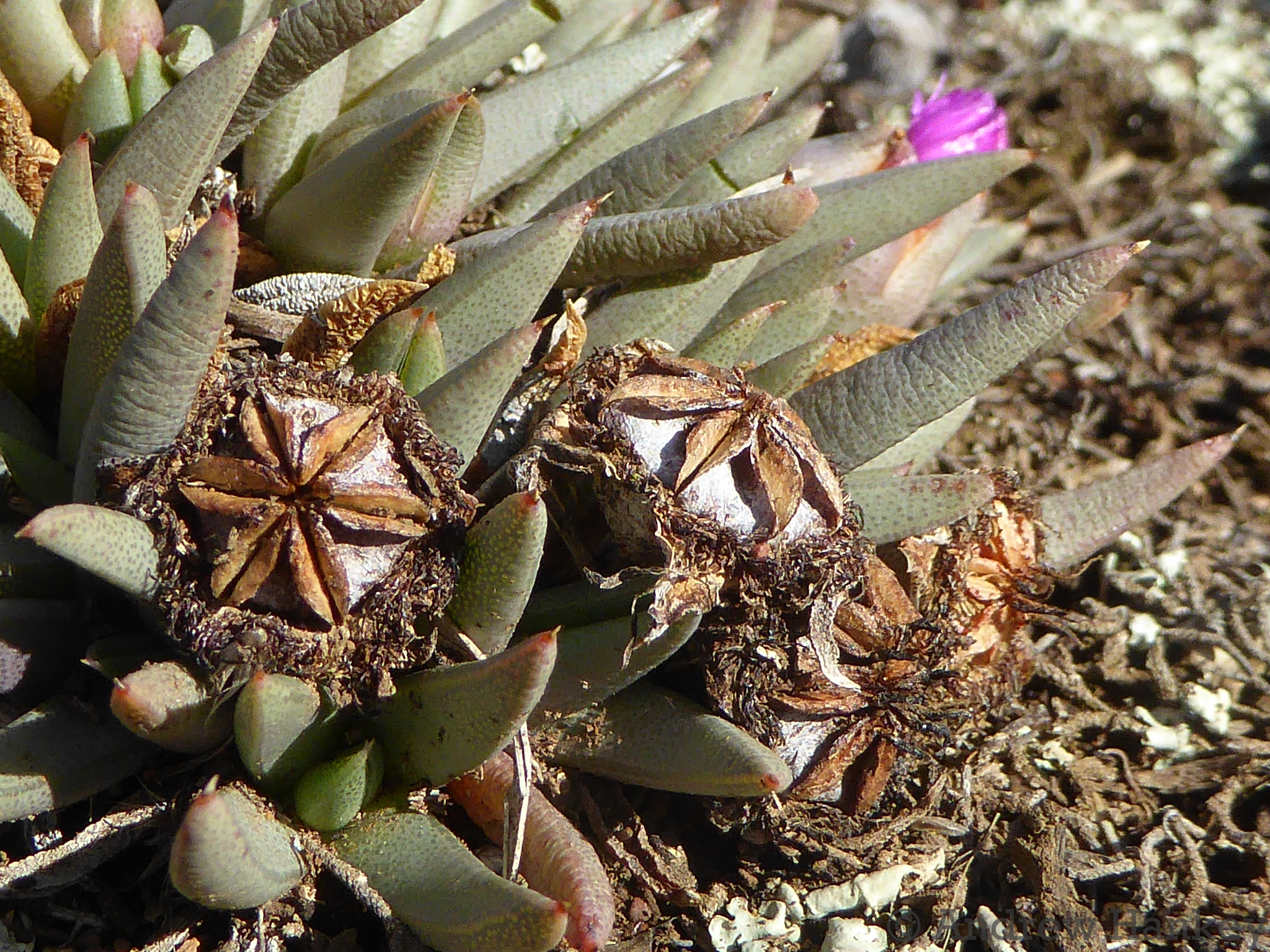

Conservation status
- Critically Endangered (IUCN 3.1)

Scientific classification
- Kingdom: Plantae
- Clade: Tracheophytes
- Clade: Angiosperms
- Clade: Eudicots
- Order: Caryophyllales
- Family: Aizoaceae
- Genus: Khadia
- Species: K. beswickii

Binomial name
- Khadia beswickii (L.Bolus) N.E.Br.

Synonyms
- Khadia nelsonii N.E.Br.; Mesembryanthemum beswickii L.Bolus

= Khadia beswickii =

Species of succulent

Khadia beswickii is a species of plant in the family Aizoaceae. It is a succulent subshrub endemic to Gauteng Province of South Africa. Its natural habitat is subtropical or tropical dry lowland grassland. It is threatened by habitat loss and critically endangered.
