= Philip Herd Nature Reserve =

Nature reserve in South Africa

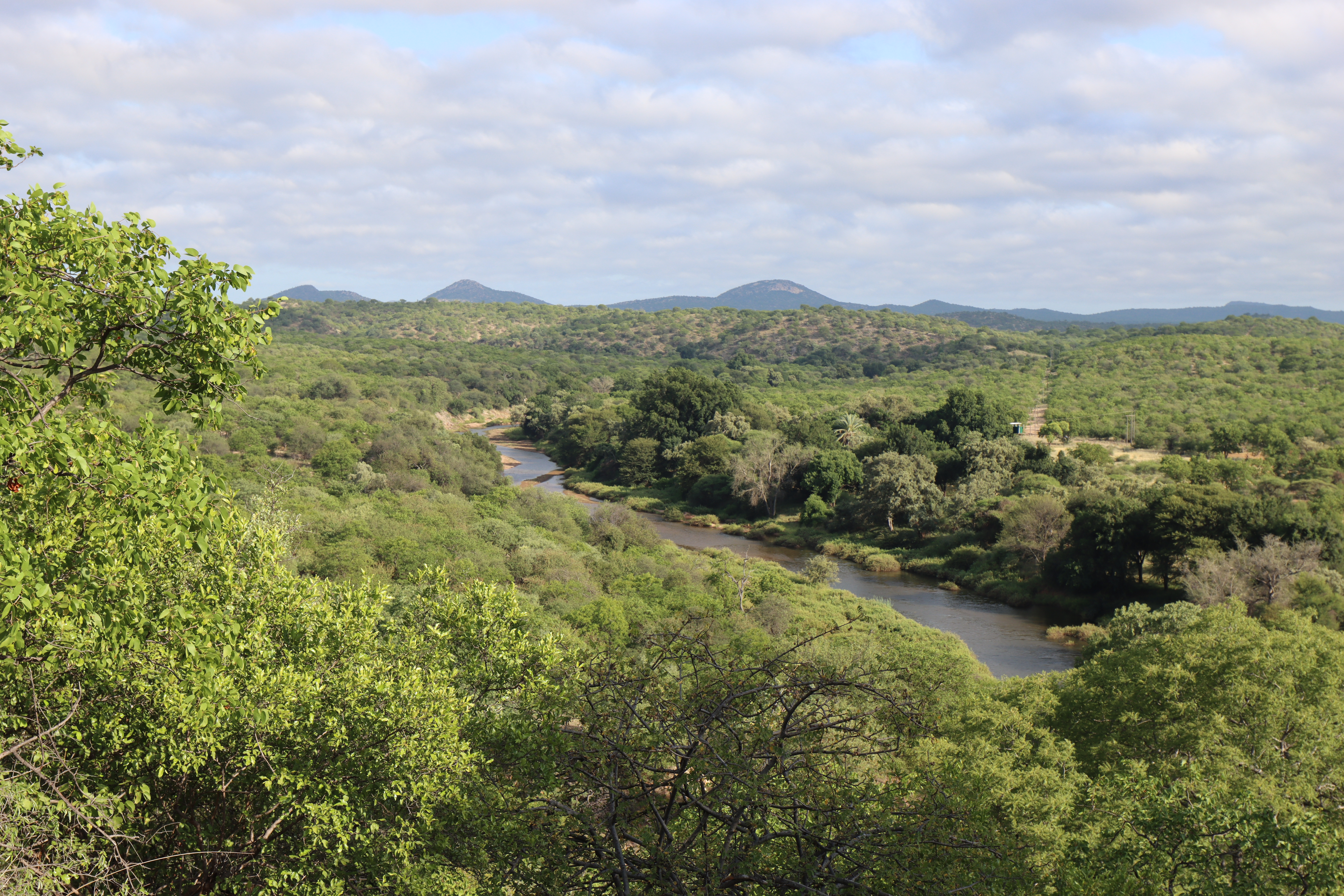
Nzhelele River, Philip Herd Nature Reserve, Limpopo, South Africa

Philip Herd Nature Reserve is a nature reserve within the UNESCO Vhembe Biosphere Reserve in the Vhembe District of Limpopo Province, South Africa. The reserve is located east of the town of Musina on the Limpopo River which forms the border between South Africa and Zimbabwe. It covers an area of 12,000 hectares (Ha), of which 6,616.42 Ha is a declared protected area in terms of South Africa's National Environmental Management Act: Protected Areas Act of 2003. The reserve conserves a critically biodiverse area of Limpopo Ridge Bushveld and 1.5% of the Nzhelele River catchment (Quaternary A80G), which forms part of the Limpopo Water Management Area (WMA) established in terms of South Africa's National Water Act of 1998. The reserve operates under the brand name, The Herd Reserve.

The Philip Herd Nature Reserve was proclaimed in 1967 in the provincial government gazette (Proclamation Notice No. 281 of 1967, Transvaal Provincial Gazette No. 3291, vol. 202, 13 September 1967) and is a partnership between private landowners and the Limpopo provincial government conservation authority, the Limpopo Department of Economic Development Environment and Tourism, LEDET.

The reserve is located at GPS co-ordinates: -22.361688401047353, 30.346695811365834

== Critical biodiversity and conservation ==
The South African National Biodiversity Institute classifies the area under management as a Critical Biodiversity Area (CBA 1 and 2), a designation mirrored in the Limpopo Conservation Plan, V2, 2013 and the Vhembe District Bioregional Plan, 2017.

The reserve contributes towards conservation targets for the Limpopo Ridge Bushveld vegetation unit of the savanna biome prescribed in South Africa’s National Protected Areas Expansion Strategy, 2016 and the Limpopo Protected Areas Expansion Strategy.

== Topography, geology, climate and vegetation ==
Typical of Limpopo Ridge Bushveld, a veld type that occurs only in the northernmost extremes of Limpopo Province, between Mapungubwe Mountain in the Mapungubwe National Park in the east and the far northern reaches of the Kruger National Park in the west, the landscape is dominated by undulating, wooded hills. Rocky ridges, irregular level plains and valleys traversed with drainage courses are characteristic.

The veld type occurs at an altitude of about 300m in the east up to 700m and mostly on gneiss and other rocks of the Beit Bridge Complex as well as sediments (including sandstones of the Clarens Formation) and basalt (particularly in the east) of the Karoo Supergroup. Limpopo Ridge Bushveld occurs in the summer rainfall areas of southern Africa with very dry winters including the months of May to September. The mean annual precipitation is between 300 and 400 mm and it is generally a frost-free area.

The vegetation structure is a moderately open savanna.

Over 100 different tree species occur in the area. Important species in the tall tree segment of the open savanna include the baobab (Adansonia digitate); the mashatu or nyala tree (Xanthocercis zambesiaca); jackalberry (Diospyros mespiliformis); knob thorn (Acacia nigrescens); mrula (Sclerocarya birrea subsp. afra). Mopane stands (Colophospermum mopane) dominate the plains, white syringa (Kirkia acuminata) is prominent on the crests of the ridges, while groves of fever trees (Vachellia xanthophloea) and rock figs (Ficus abutilifolia) grow on the banks of the Limpopo and Nzhelele rivers.

== Wildlife ==
Common mammalian species supported by the various habitats include Giraffe, Burchell's zebra, Blue wildebeest, Kudu, Impala, Waterbuck, Common eland, Gemsbok and other antelope species, including the endemic Nyala, as well as naturally occurring predators, such as leopard, African wild dog, hyena and Black-backed jackal. Over 250 bird species have been recorded, including several rare and endangered species.

The following threatened species have been confirmed present on reserve:

- Pangolin (Manis tyemminckii) – conservation status: Vulnerable
- Leopard (Panthera pardus) – conservation status: Vulnerable.
- African Wild Dog (Lycaon pictus) – conservation status: Endangered.
- Cape clawless otter (Aonyx capensis) – conservation status: Near threatened
- Southern African python (Python natalensis) – conservation status: Vulnerable
- Kori bustard (Ardeotis kori) – conservation status: near threatened
- Crocodile (Crocodilus niloticus) – conservation status: least concern, but listed on CITES under Appendix I and II.
- Saddle billed stork (Ephippiorhynchus senegalensis) conservation status: Least Concern (Population decreasing)
