= Khadia media =

Scientific classification
- Kingdom: Plantae
- Clade: Tracheophytes
- Clade: Angiosperms
- Clade: Eudicots
- Order: Caryophyllales
- Family: Aizoaceae
- Genus: Khadia
- Species: K. media

Binomial name
- Khadia media P.J.D.Winter & N.Hahn

Species of succulent

Khadia media is a succulent plant that is part of the Aizoaceae family. The species is endemic to South Africa and occurs in Limpopo in the Wolkberg in the Haenertsburg area. The plant is threatened by invasive plants.
