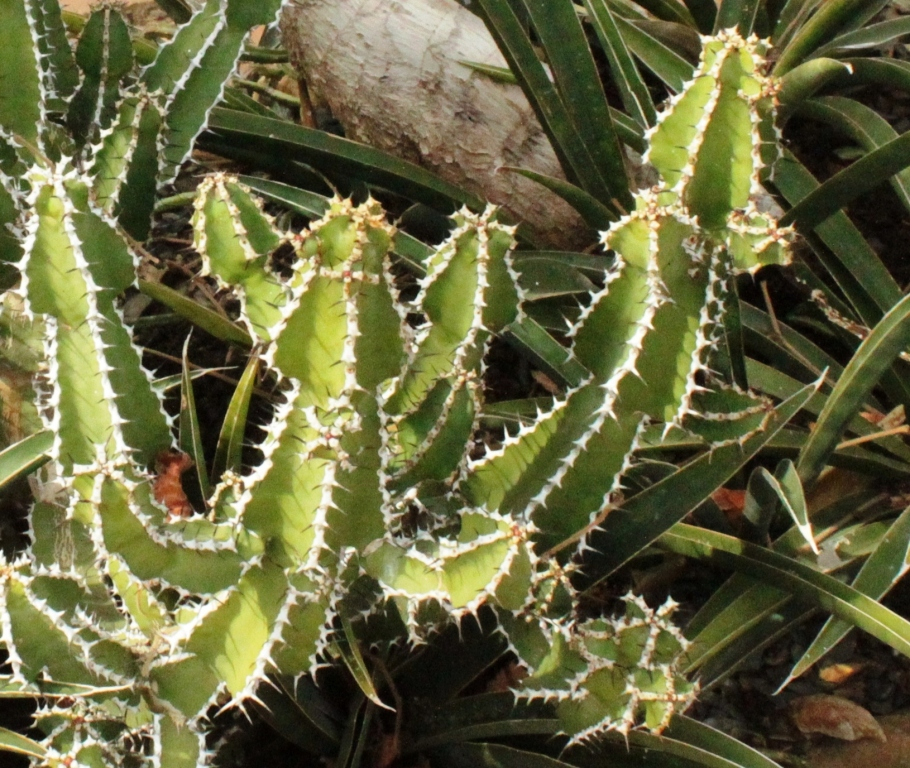

Scientific classification
- Kingdom: Plantae
- Clade: Tracheophytes
- Clade: Angiosperms
- Clade: Eudicots
- Clade: Rosids
- Order: Malpighiales
- Family: Euphorbiaceae
- Genus: Euphorbia
- Species: E. rowlandii

Binomial name
- Euphorbia rowlandii R.A.Dyer

= Euphorbia rowlandii =

Levuvhu euphorbia

Species of succulent

Euphorbia rowlandii, the Levuvhu euphorbia, is a succulent member of the spurge family native to the Soutpansberg region in South Africa, and southeastern Zimbabwe. It is a medium-sized, monoecious shrub with multiple spiny blue-green photosynthetic stems. The species is superficially similar to E. waterbergensis, and is named after the Levubu River.

== Description ==
A perennial, succulent shrub of up to 2 m tall and about as wide, with trunk that rises only a bit above ground, from which many branches spread that become erect. The spine shields form a continuous hard margin along the branch angles.

== Habitat ==
It is native to northern South Africa and southern Zimbabwe, where it grows on cliffs or sandstone ridges at low altitude (300 to 500 m) in hot dry areas, and may be found in the vicinity of E. confinalis. In Zimbabwe it is found in the Pesu river gorge, some 23 km north of Pafuri.
