= Mutshedzi Dam =

- Interactive map of Mutshedzi Dam
- Official name: Mutshedzi Dam
- Location: Limpopo, South Africa
- Coordinates: 22°56′55″S 30°9′40″E
- Opening date: 1990
- Operators: Department of Water Affairs and Forestry

Dam and spillways
- Type of dam: gravity
- Impounds: Mutshedzi River
- Height: 22.5 metres (74 ft)
- Length: 160 metres (520 ft)

Reservoir
- Creates: Mutshedzi Dam Reservoir
- Total capacity: 216,464,000 cubic metres (7.6444×10^{9} cu ft)
- Surface area: 594 hectares (1,470 acres)

Mutshedzi Dam is a gravity type dam located on the Mutshedzi River, a tributary of the Nzhelele River. It is located 40 km to the west of Thohoyandou, Limpopo, South Africa. It was established in 1990 and serves mainly for irrigation purposes. The hazard potential of the dam has been ranked significant (2).

== See also ==
- List of reservoirs and dams in South Africa
- List of rivers of South Africa
