= Luphephe Dam =

- Location within South Africa
- Official name: Luphephe Dam
- Location: Limpopo, South Africa
- Coordinates: 22°38′12″S 30°24′19″E
- Opening date: 1964
- Operators: Department of Water Affairs and Forestry

Dam and spillways
- Type of dam: arch
- Impounds: Luphephe River
- Height: 39 metres (128 ft)
- Length: 85 metres (279 ft)

Reservoir
- Creates: Luphephe Dam Reservoir
- Total capacity: 14,800,000 cubic metres (520,000,000 cu ft)
- Catchment area: 157 km^{2}
- Surface area: 141.6 hectares (350 acres)

Luphephe Dam is an arch type dam located on the Luphephe River, a tributary of the Nwanedi River, part of the Limpopo River basin. It is located 48 km 48 kilometres (30 mi) southeast of Musina, Limpopo, South Africa. It was established in 1964 and it serves mainly for irrigation purposes. The hazard potential of the dam has been ranked high (3).

Its twin dam, the Nwanedi, is located to the west of the dam, less than 250 metres (270 yd) away.

== See also ==
- List of reservoirs and dams in South Africa
- List of rivers of South Africa
