= Nzhelele Dam =

- Location within South Africa
- Official name: Nzhelele Dam
- Country: South Africa
- Location: Limpopo
- Coordinates: 22°43′30″S 30°05′45″E
- Purpose: Irrigation
- Opening date: 1948
- Owner: Department of Water Affairs

Dam and spillways
- Type of dam: Arch dam
- Impounds: Nzhelele River
- Height: 47 m (154 ft)
- Length: 91 m (299 ft)

Reservoir
- Creates: Nzhelele Dam Reservoir
- Total capacity: 51 234 000 m^{3}
- Catchment area: 832 km^{2}
- Surface area: 544.2 ha

Nzhelele Dam (also known as Njelele Dam) is an arch type dam located on the Nzhelele River in Limpopo Province, South Africa. It has a capacity of 55.3 million m^{3}. It was established in 1948. The main purpose of the dam is to serve for irrigation and its hazard potentials has been ranked high (3).

== See also ==
- List of reservoirs and dams in South Africa
