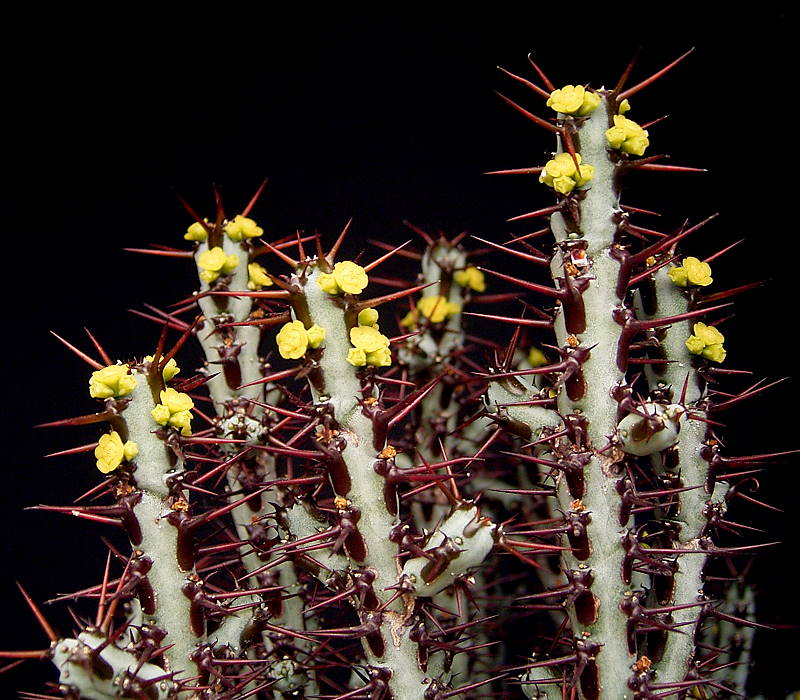

Scientific classification
- Kingdom: Plantae
- Clade: Tracheophytes
- Clade: Angiosperms
- Clade: Eudicots
- Clade: Rosids
- Order: Malpighiales
- Family: Euphorbiaceae
- Genus: Euphorbia
- Species: E. aeruginosa

Binomial name
- Euphorbia aeruginosa Schweick.

= Euphorbia aeruginosa =

Species of succulent

Euphorbia aeruginosa is a succulent member of the spurge family native to northern Limpopo Province of South Africa. It grows as a small shrub, in sandy soils and in the fractures of rocks sending up multiple spiny blue-green photosynthetic stems. The plant produces yellow cyathia or flowering heads.

As most other succulent members of the genus Euphorbia, its trade is regulated under Appendix II of CITES.
