= Nzhelele River =

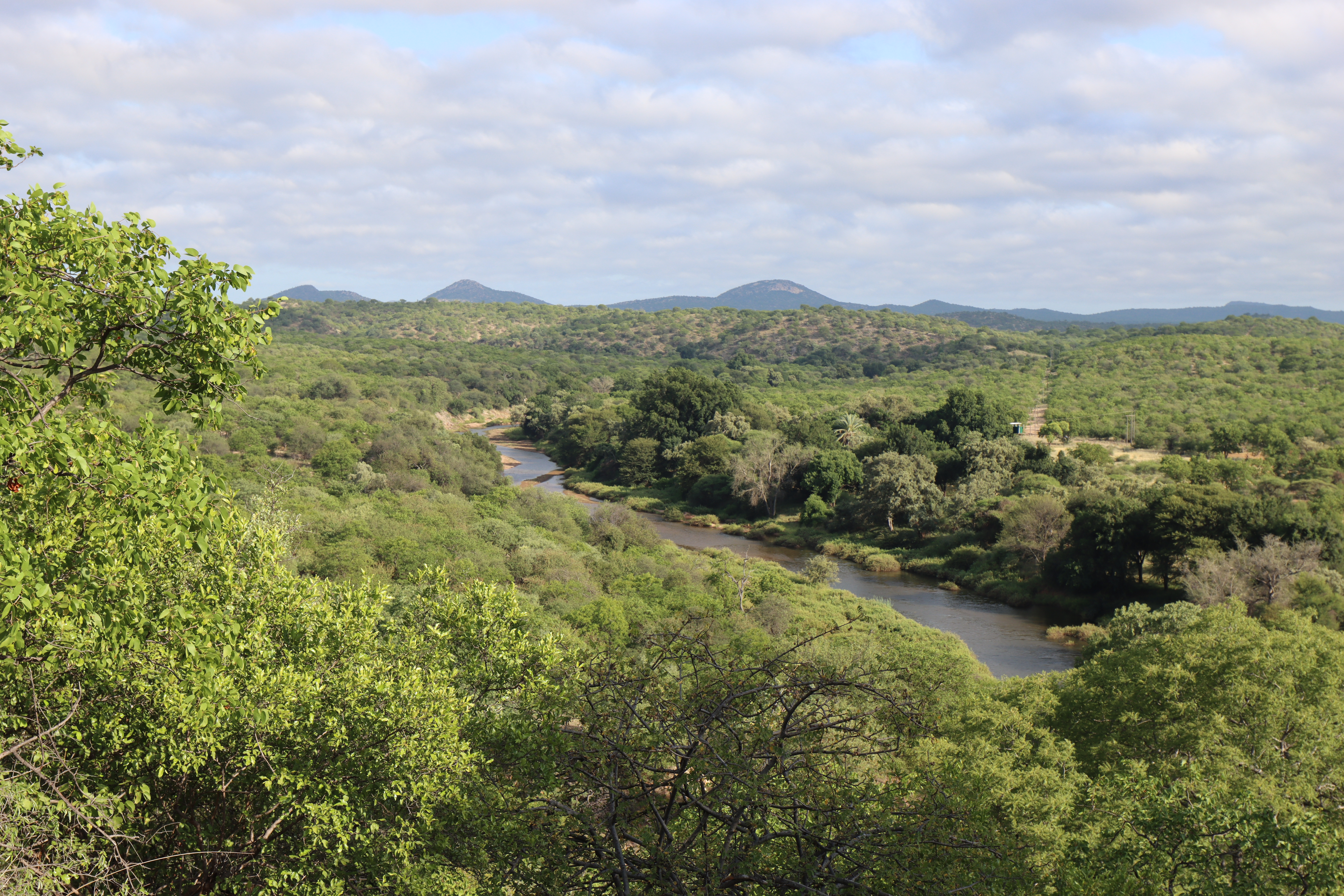
- View of the Nzhelele River in the Philip Herd Nature Reserve

- Location of the Nzhelele River mouth
- Etymology: Nzhelele meaning a falcon or an eagle that in ancient times followed elephant hunters and fed on the meat hanging in the trees to dry.

Location
- Country: South Africa
- State: Limpopo Province
- Region: Dzanani
- District: Vhembe
- Municipality: Makhado

Physical characteristics
- Source: Thathe Vondo
  - location: Soutpansberg
  - elevation: 1,673 m (5,489 ft)
- Mouth
  - location: Limpopo River, South Africa/Zimbabwe border
  - coordinates: 22°21′08″S 30°22′19″E
  - elevation: 404 m (1,325 ft)
- Basin size: 3,436 km^{2} (1,327 sq mi)

Basin features
- Tributaries
  - left: Mutamba
  - right: Mufungudi, Tshishiru

The Nzhelele River is a major watercourse in Limpopo Province, South Africa. The river's catchment area comprises 3,436 square kilometers.

== Course ==
This river collects much of the drainage of the northern slopes of the extensive rock formation of the Soutpansberg. Leaving the mountainous area, it meanders in a northeastward direction across the Lowveld, a wide plain that contains considerable biodiversity, including numerous large mammals such as giraffes, white rhinos and blue wildebeests. It joins the right bank of the Limpopo River 33 km east of Musina.

The Mutamba River, its main tributary, rises in the Buelgum Poort farm of the Soutpansberg, further west from the sources of the Nzhelele. Other tributaries are the Tshiruru River, Mugungudi River, Mutshedzi River and the Wyllie River.

== Dams in the basin ==
- Nzhelele Dam
- Mutshedzi Dam, in the Mutshedzi River

== See also ==
- Drainage basin A
- Limpopo Water Management Area
- List of rivers of South Africa
