= Nwanedi Dam =

- Interactive map of Nwanedi Dam
- Official name: Nwanedi Dam
- Location: South Africa
- Coordinates: 22°38′15″S 30°23′57″E
- Opening date: 1964
- Operators: Department of Water Affairs and Forestry

Dam and spillways
- Type of dam: arch
- Impounds: Nwanedi River
- Height: 36 m
- Length: 110 m

Reservoir
- Creates: Nwanedi Dam Reservoir
- Total capacity: 5 310 000 m^{3}
- Catchment area: 109 km^{2}
- Surface area: 56.6 ha

Nwanedi Dam is an arch type dam located on the Nwanedi River, part of the Limpopo River basin. It is located 48 km southeast of Musina, Limpopo Province, South Africa. It was established in 1964 and serves mainly for irrigation purposes. The hazard potential of the dam has been ranked high (3).

It is a twin dam, the Luphephe Dam is located just east of the dam, less than 0.25 km away.

== See also ==
- List of reservoirs and dams in South Africa
