= Tshipise =

- Location within Limpopo Location within South Africa
- Coordinates: 22.534°S 30.670°E
- Country: South Africa
- Province: Limpopo
- District: Vhembe
- Municipality: Musina

Area
  - Total: 1.50 km^{2} (0.58 sq mi)

Population (2011)
  - Total: 1,052
  - Density: 701/km^{2} (1,820/sq mi)

Racial makeup (2011)
  - Black African: 98.8%
  - Indian/Asian: 0.6%
  - Other: 0.7%

First languages (2011)
  - Venda: 94.8%
  - English: 1.0%
  - Other: 4.2%
- Time zone: UTC+2 (SAST)
- Postal code (street): 0901
- PO box: 0901
- Area code: 015

Tshipise is a town in Vhembe District Municipality in the Limpopo province of South Africa.

Holiday resort 39 km south-east of Musina and 86 km north-east of Louis Trichardt. It was developed from 1936. Formerly spelt Chipise, the name is said to be derived from Tshivenḓa “tshisima tsha u fhisa”, ‘hot spring’, referring to the mineral springs at 65 °C.

Tshipise is best known for the resort, Tshipise a Forever Resort, that provides refuge for the Swaeltjies (Swallows), the nickname given to pensioned people travelling north to Tshipise a Forever Resort for the winter months. The Swaeltjies stay at the resort's caravan park mostly from April to August as the winter temperatures at Tshipise is around 24 °C during the day, making it a perfect winter vacation destination.
