= Musina =

Musina Messina
- Location within Limpopo Location within South Africa Location within Africa
- Coordinates: 22°20′17″S 30°02′30″E
- Country: South Africa
- Province: Limpopo
- District: Vhembe
- Municipality: Musina
- Established: 1904

Area
  - Total: 109.38 km^{2} (42.23 sq mi)

Population (2011)
  - Total: 42,678
  - Density: 390.18/km^{2} (1,010.6/sq mi)

Racial makeup (2011)
  - Black African: 93.3%
  - Coloured: 0.4%
  - Indian/Asian: 0.7%
  - White: 5.1%
  - Other: 0.5%

First languages (2011)
  - Venda: 48.8%
  - Sotho: 11.7%
  - Northern Sotho: 10.4%
  - English: 5.4%
  - Other: 23.7%
- Time zone: UTC+2 (SAST)
- Postal code (street): 0900
- PO box: 0900
- Area code: 015
- Website: www.musina.gov.za

Musina, also known as Messina (/mɛˈsiːnə/), is the northernmost town in the Limpopo province of South Africa. It is located near the confluence of the Limpopo River with the Sand River and the border to Zimbabwe with a population of between 20,000 and 40,000. Iron ore, coal, magnetite, graphite, asbestos, diamonds, semi-precious stones and copper are mined in the region.

== History ==
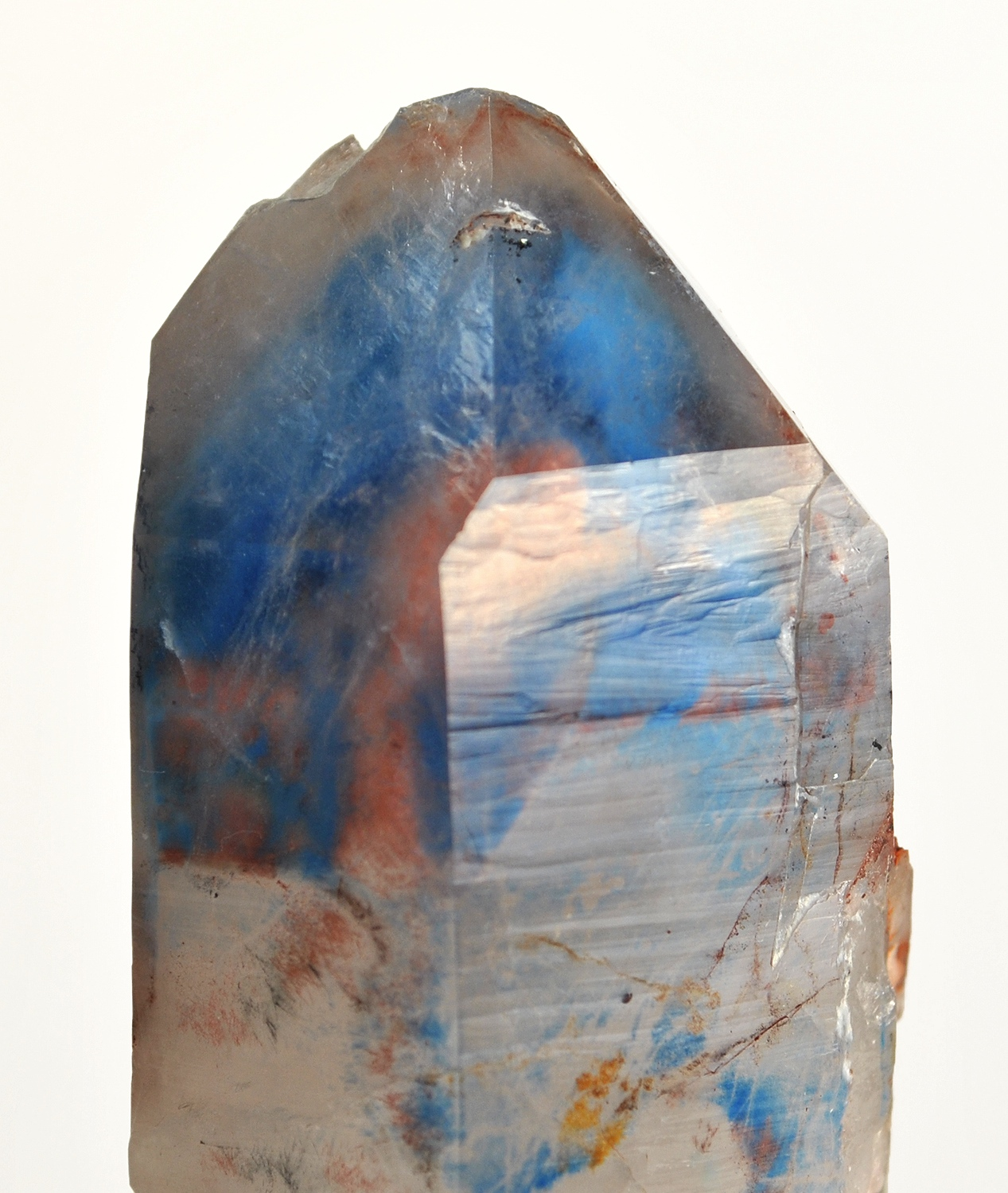
Copper and Papagoite in Quartz, from old Messina mine.

After serving in the Anglo-Boer War, Colonel John Pascoe "J.P." Grenfell (1866-1948), grandson of John Pascoe Grenfell and brother of Francis Octavius Grenfell, came to South Africa after hearing rumours of valuable copper being in the area. Two prospectors, James Harper and James Campbell, told Grenfell that there were copper deposits, south of the Limpopo River, where the local tribe discovered them. Apparently, the tribe had mined the copper, but the prospectors said their mining of it had ceased.

Grenfell went to the area and had the deposits inspected. After verifying that they were valuable, he purchased a farm, Berkenrode, near a planned mining site, in October 1903. Five months later, he was granted a discoverer's certificate and, in that same month (March 1904), he founded the village Messina (later Musina).

In January 1905, he founded, and chaired, the Messina (Transvaal) Development Company, which became one of the largest companies in South Africa. Prior to becoming president of the United States, Herbert Hoover, served on the board of the company from 1914 to 1916. Most people in Musina are either Venda people or Sotho people. Roughly 5% of residents in Musina are English-speaking Whites of British descent, almost exclusively this portion of the population are White Zimbabweans who have relocated to South Africa since the year 2000.

== Geography ==
The Limpopo River is a large river which flows strongly during the annual rainy season, when lichen and other plant species of the dry region come alive. Sometimes, it floods it's dry river banks. The low-shrub and thorny tree lands that surround Musina and thrive in rains are alive with animals in sanctuaries that offer experienced-only camping safari accessible by sand and rock road tracks.

=== Road ===
The N1 road connects Musina with the Beitbridge border with Zimbabwe 15 kilometres to the north and to Louis Trichardt, Polokwane and Pretoria in the south (as a toll road). The R572 road connects Musina with the Mapungubwe National Park, the Pontdrif border with Botswana, and Alldays in the west. The R508 road connects south-east to Tshipise.

== Border with Zimbabwe ==
The link with Zimbabwe at Beitbridge has become one of the busiest roads in the world and the busiest in Africa, due to black market importers from Zimbabwe and people looking for employment. This is mainly due to thousands crossing the border into South Africa every day. According to The New York Times, in January 2009, Musina had a shifting population of about 15,000 foreigners, overwhelmingly Zimbabweans, many of whom lived in a refugee camp at the showground or in the streets.

== Name ==
"Musina" is the TshiVenda word for copper, derived from a root that means spoil. This relates to the fact that copper "spoilt" the Venda's efforts to mine gold in the region, as they could not effectively separate the gold from the relatively insignificant copper.

== Climate ==
Musina experiences a tropical semi-arid climate (Koppen: BSh) with hot temperatures most of the year. Average annual precipitation amounts to 372 mm (14.6 in), and is highly concentrated in the summer months from October to April when severe late-afternoon and evening thunderstorms are common. Winter is extremely dry, with almost no precipitation, typically recorded in the driest months from June to August. Clear skies and exceptionally low humidity at this time of the year enable temperatures to plunge close to freezing at night, although frost is fairly uncommon.

Climate data for Musina, South Africa
Month	Jan	Feb	Mar	Apr	May	Jun	Jul	Aug	Sep	Oct	Nov	Dec	Year
Mean daily maximum °C (°F)	33 (91)	32 (90)	31 (88)	30 (86)	28 (82)	25 (77)	25 (77)	27 (81)	29 (84)	31 (88)	32 (90)	32 (90)	30 (85)
Mean daily minimum °C (°F)	21 (70)	21 (70)	19 (66)	16 (61)	12 (54)	8 (46)	8 (46)	10 (50)	14 (57)	17 (63)	19 (66)	20 (68)	15 (60)
Average precipitation mm (inches)	61 (2.4)	65 (2.6)	42 (1.7)	26 (1.0)	12 (0.5)	4 (0.2)	1 (0.0)	2 (0.1)	15 (0.6)	33 (1.3)	55 (2.2)	56 (2.2)	372 (14.6)
Average precipitation days	8	8	5	4	2	2	2	1	3	5	7	9	55
Source: World Climate Guide

== Schools ==
=== High schools ===
- Musina High School
- Hoërskool Eric Louw
- Renaissance Secondary School

=== Primary schools ===
- Makushu Primary School
- Bonwa Udi Primary School
- Nehemiah Christian School
- Rehoshebah Primary School
- Gateway Primary School
- Rixile Primary School
- Messina Primary School
- St Martin De Porres Primary School
