= Venda kingdom =

18th and 19th-century state in South Africa

- Status: State from late-17th c.–1898 Currently a non-sovereign monarchy within South Africa
- Capital: Dzata (late-17th c.–mid- to late-18th c.); Tshirululuni (?–1864); Luatame (1864–1898)
- Common languages: Tshivenda
- Religion: Venda traditional religion
- Government: Monarchy
- Khosikhulu
  - late-17th century: Dambanyika (first, according to David Beach and Edwin Hanisch)
  - 18th century: Thohoyandou
  - 1895–1925: Mphephu (last sovereign)
  - 1979–1988: Patrick Mphephu
  - 1990–present: Disputed

History
  - Established: late-17th century
  - Fragmentation of the state: mid- to late-18th century
  - Boer invasion, later incorporated into the British Transvaal Colony: 1898
  - Establishment of the Venda bantustan: 1979
  - Abolishment of the Venda kingship: 1990
  - South African government recognises the Ramabulana as kings of all Venda: 2010
Preceded by
Rozvi Empire

The Venda kingdom or Singo state was a Venda state located in the Soutpansberg mountain range and ruled by the Singo clan (also called "Vhasenzi").

In the centuries following the collapse of Mapungubwe c. 1300, interactions between Sotho-speakers, early Shona-speakers, and latecomer Shona-speakers in the Soutpansberg led to the formation of the Venda language (Tshivenda) and identity. In the late-17th century, dynastic members of the Rozvi Empire migrated south across the Limpopo River with their followers; collectively they were the Singo mutupo ("clan"). The Singo settled Dzata in Soutpansberg, and conquered the surrounding Nzhelele Valley. In Singo tradition, Thohoyandou is credited with expanding the state, and the Singo came to subdue all of Soutpansberg.

Over the course of the 18th century, trade routes shifted south, and around 1780 the state collapsed. The most powerful dynasties that remained were the Ramabulana Singo in western Soutpansberg, and the Tshivhase Singo and Mphaphuli Singo in eastern Soutpansberg. Throughout the 19th century, Venda rulers such as Makhado fended off Boer attempts at gaining hegemony and land to settle, until an invasion in 1898 forced Ramabulana leader Mphephu to flee. A year later, the British invaded and conquered the Boers to establish the Transvaal Colony, after which Mphephu returned. Transvaal was incorporated into the Union of South Africa in 1910.

In 1979 Ramabulana leader Patrick Mphephu was made President of the new Venda bantustan and Khosikhulu (king) of all Venda, and his authoritarian rule contributed towards enforcing 'grand apartheid'. He died in 1988 and after a coup in 1990 the Venda kingship was abolished, while the bantustan was reincorporated into South Africa following the end of apartheid in 1994. In 2010 the South African government recognised the Ramabulana leader as Khosikhulu of all Venda, though a leader dispute ensued between incumbent Toni Mphephu and Masindi Mpephu, which is yet to be resolved as of 2025.

== Geography ==
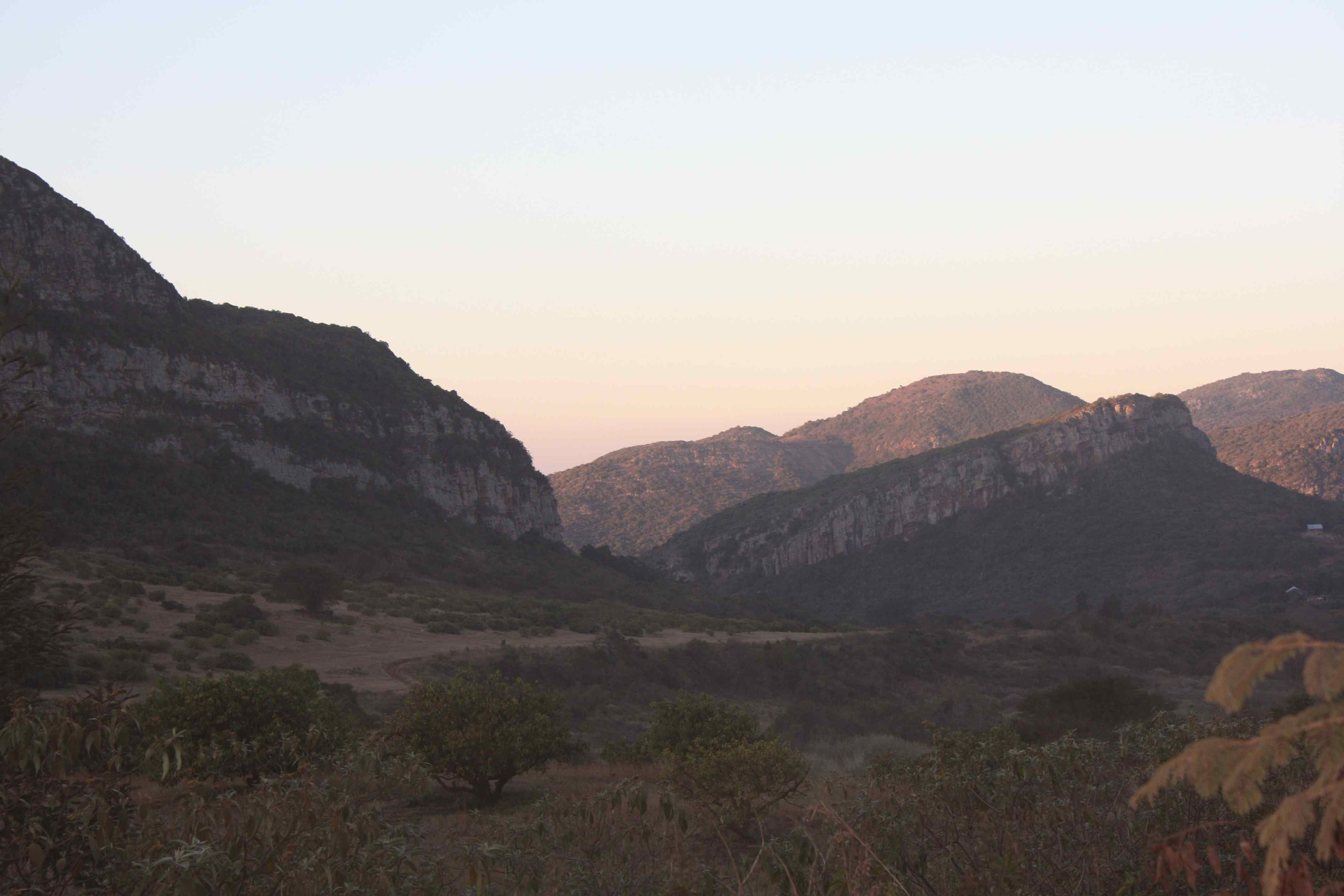
The Soutpansberg near Tshirululuni

The Soutpansberg is a mountain range in northeastern modern-day South Africa (near the border with Zimbabwe) that runs west to east, with mountains reaching 1,737 m (5,699 ft) in the west and 609 m (1,998 ft) in the far-east. Close to the Soutpansberg in the north is the Limpopo River, and it is bordered by the Blouberg mountain range in the west, the Pietersburg Plateau in the south, and the Levubu River in the east. The area north of the Soutpansberg has a semi-arid climate, while the area south experiences more rainfall.

== History ==
=== Background ===
The Kingdom of Mapungubwe was a Shona (specifically Kalanga) state, located north of the Soutpansberg mountain range and south of the Limpopo River, that flourished during the 13th century. Mapungubwe collapsed c. 1300 and its population dispersed, with some settling just north of the Soutpansberg. South of the Soutpansberg were Sotho-speaking people, a distinct group that was isolated from those in north.

The pre-Singo mitupo (totem-affiliated clans; sing. mutupo) in the Soutpansberg are collectively called Ngano by the Singo; it is unclear which ones came from the north or south. The earliest people in western Soutpansberg (Vhuilafuri) were supposedly a chiefdom led by Luvhalane and another chiefdom near Zwavhumbwa Mountain. In central Soutpansberg (Vhutavhatsindi), according to tradition, there were groups at Tshiendeulu and Luonde mountains. To the east in the central Mutale Valley (Vhumbedzi) there were the Dzivhani. Ngona are remembered in the southeast around the Levubu River (Vhuronga), though not in the northeast (Niani) which was inhabited by the Nyai.

In the early-15th century elite stone-walled settlements related to the Kingdom of Butua appeared northwest of Soutpansberg, and new Shona dynasties arrived in Soutpansberg. A Shona dynasty from one such settlement, the Tshivhula centred in Machemma, came to dominate Luvhalane's chiefdom and controlled 10,000 km^{2} (3,900 sq mi), while a Sotho-speaking mutupo (Dau) settled just south of central Soutpansberg. The Kwevho, who had connections to both Shona- and Sotho-speaking groups, replaced the groups in central Soutpansberg. The Mbedzi claim to have migrated from Malungudze Hill in southern modern-day Zimbabwe to conquer the Dzivhani, and settled Makoleni sometime between the 15th and 16th centuries, with tradition holding their first ruler as the renowned rainmaker Luvhimbi. (Note: David Beach said that the Mbedzi dynasty at Malungudze Hill migrated there from Soutpansberg no earlier than the 18th century. He also said that "Luvhimbi" was likely to have been a title.) Following this, the Dzivhani changed their practice of burying rulers at Tshilavhulu Mountain to burying religious figures in river pools. Close interactions between the Sotho- and Shona-speaking groups over the following centuries led to the formation of a common language, Tshivenda, which, as Kalanga practices such as domba (initiation school) incorporated Sotho-speakers, saw the formation of a Venda identity.

=== Singo conquest, apogee, and collapse ===
Further north in modern-day Zimbabwe around 1683, Changamire Dombo of the Rozvi Empire conquered the Kingdom of Butua. Jannie Loubser concludes that archaeological and historical evidence indicates that the Singo were dynastic Rozvi and left the empire between 1680 and 1700, with oral traditions mentioning "political dissension". Some Singo traditions say their first ruler originated from "Matangoni Mountain" near some lakes, which is thought to have been close to the Rozvi capital of Dhlo Dhlo. Following Changamire's death in 1696, a succession dispute ensued between three of his sons. Thomas Huffman writes that, after losing, one of these sons migrated south across the Limpopo with his followers; together they comprised the Singo mutupo. The Singo were accompanied on their migration by the Lovedu and Mwenye (Shona-speaking Muslims who had lost the 1644 Butua civil war; they later became the Lemba). The Singo settled Dzata in Soutpansberg in the late-17th century. (Note: Singo regnal lists vary from giving 6 to 4 generations of rulers in Soutpansberg prior to Makhado (r. 1864–?). Due to evidence of rulers' reigns being combined into one for traditions (a practice known as telescoping), Jannie Loubser favours the longest version, which dates the Singo's arrival to the late-17th century. Archaeological research at Dzata dates the settlement to sometime in the 17th century, while Mahumane's early-18th century account strongly indicates a late-17th century arrival.) While early informants said that Dzata in Nzhelele Valley, also called "Dzata Mikondeni", was the first Singo settlement, later informants say it was another ruins also called Dzata or "Dzata Tshiendeulu" on Tshiendeulu Mountain above the valley, which was later abandoned for Dzata Mikondeni. Radio-carbon dating at Dzata Tshiendeulu dates it to the 15th and 16th centuries, and archaeologist Edwin Hanisch writes that it was likely occupied by earlier Shona settlers, namely the Netshiendeulu, rather than the Singo.

Singo traditions vary greatly. Loubser writes that there is evidence of Singo tradition combining rulers' reigns into one (a practice known as "telescoping"), assisted by successors being given previous rulers' names as praise names. Venda tradition holds that the first Singo ruler was Dambanyika (also called "Vele Lambeu" or "Dyambeu", based on the Rozvi title Chikurawadyembeu which was likely another name for Dombo). David Beach says that from Dzata, Dambanyika conquered the Nzhelele Valley. (Note: Various Venda traditions say that their chiefs were protected by medicines that hid the musanda (royal area) under a pool, and that powerful enemies overcame this and caused the village to disappear into the pool. These traditions symbolise chiefs losing political power but retaining control over their 'pool' (population, as pools were associated with procreation).) Traditions say that the Singo were empowered by a magical and sacred drum called Ngoma Lungundu (carried by the Lemba), and that with one beat of the drum Mwari killed all resistance. Dynasties like the Luvhimbi were given ritual authority due to the Singo fearing rain would cease if they were dismantled. Netshiendeulu tradition says that their chief was an uncle of Dambanyika, and that he showed Dambanyika around and told him to respect Tshiendeulu Mountain and only visit or hunt there with his permission. In Singo tradition Dambanyika is said to have been a keen hunter, who was often accompanied by his dogs. Accordingly one of his dogs chased a rabbit into a cave at Tshiendeulu and Dambanyika followed. A boulder fell and blocked the entrance, and his other dogs waited outside. Netshiendeulu tradition says that this was because Dambanyika did not have permission. (Note: Hanisch writes that an earthquake may have fell the boulder, because earthquakes were often interpreted as Mwari stamping his feet in anger with the people.) In Singo tradition it is said that after a long search, Dambanyika's son Phophi found the cave guarded by the dogs, and Dambanyika told him that he was content with resting there. (Note: The sacred gravesite of Dambanyika at Tshiendeulu Mountain is today tended to by the Netshiendeulu family. As of 2007, the Ngoma Lungundu drums were kept in a nearby cave.) Some versions say Phophi was led there by Dambanyika's favourite dog (a female). Phophi then ascended to the kingship, taking the title of Thohoyandou (derived from Sororezhou, a Shona praise name for Mwari meaning "head of the elephant"). Thohoyandou is credited with expanding the state, and the Singo came to subjugate the many dynasties of Soutpansberg (analysis of Dau tradition dates this to c. 1700).

The Singo elite dominated trade which exported to Sofala and Inhambane, and with help from allied mitupo they controlled the production of high-status goods such as copper, ivory, gold, and cattle (though not subsistence goods). Jannie Loubser writes that the Singo state lacked hegemonic control, and that polities far from the core generally chose to take their prestige goods to the Singo, who then exported them to the coast. One ally was the Ndalamo mutupo. In Venda culture, cross-cousin marriage was conventional, and made eldest sisters influential. (Note: In Venda, Sotho-Tswana, and Shona cultures, when an eldest sister married her cousin (her father's sister's son), her brother was paid brideprice in the form of cattle. The brother then used the cattle to marry his cousin (his mother's brother's daughter), and this process of cross-cousin marriage would continue among the next generation, forming a convoluted network. The eldest sister thus had influence over wealth, and over her niece (brother's daughter) as her son's future wife.) The Singo dynasty intermarried with the Ndalamo dynasty such that the Ndalamo became the Singo ruler's 'father's sister's people' and vice versa, giving the fathers' eldest sisters (makhadzi) ritual authority and the ability to choose kingship successors from among princes. Tradition says that while the eldest sister of the Ndalamo chief was fomenting a succession dispute between two Singo brothers, she took the Ngoma Lungundu drum from the Lemba (who were close allies of the Singo). Some traditions say that it was around this time that the Singo adopted the Venda language.

From the early 18th century, the Dutch and British began trading at Maputo Bay, and trade routes gradually shifted south and west from the Singo in Soutpansberg to Sotho and Ndebele polities. Over time the Singo lost control of trade, contributing to the state's collapse and fragmentation. Dzata was abandoned sometime between 1750 and 1800; Hanisch suggests the 1750s. Dzata bears evidence of a large fire, with many burnt structures. Loubser writes that after the death of Thohoyandou, there was a succession dispute between claimants, causing the state to fracture. Some traditions place several kings as having ruled before Dambanyika and Thohoyandou, and say that during a succession conflict between Thohoyandou and his brothers, the sacred drum, Ngoma Lungundu, touched the ground. This is said to have greatly angered Mwari who withdrew his engagement with Singo royalty; Thohoyandou lost in battle to his brothers, and disappeared into Lake Fundudzi. Hanisch proposes that (based on a tradition) Thohoyandou was a regent and successful ruler who refused to step down when the Singo heir became older, provoking rebellion. He continues that this forced Thohoyandou to flee, and that the rebels burnt down Dzata. One tradition recorded by E. Mudau held that Dimbanyika divided the realm between his sons Ravhura, Mandiwana, Munzhedzi (Mpofu), Tshivhase, and Thohoyandou, and made Thohoyandou king. Accordingly the other brothers opposed this and conflict followed.

=== The fragmented state: resistance and colonisation ===
Following destructive civil war, the Singo elite split into three groups as part of a dispersal called Muphadalalo. The Ramabulana Singo dynasty inhabited western Soutpansberg with allied Ndalamo. The Ravhura dynasty were the successors to the Singo of Dzata, though the kingship (vhuhosivhuhulu) was taken from them by the Ramabulana Singo and they fled east, where they were subsumed by the Tshivhase and Mphaphuli Singo dynasties. In the south were the Singo's former vassals. The Tshivhase dynasty also subjugated the Mbedzi Luvhimbi dynasty; the Luvhimbi ruler's sister became their leader and the Tshivhase's principal rainmaker. In decreasing order of prestige, Tshivhase rulers came to be buried at mountains, Mbedzi leaders at pools, and Dzivhani leaders on dry ground (zwiomo, "dry ones"). During these times, Venda chiefs (pl. mahosi; sing. khosi) were largely autonomous. In the early-19th century the Venda were raided by groups fleeing the Mfecane (Mushavho; "times of flight"), and several Venda groups moved to higher ground for greater security.

Around 1830, the death of king Mpofu of the Ramabulana dynasty caused a succession conflict between his two sons, Ramavhoya and Ramabulana (from whom the dynasty gets its name). Ramavhoya won and was installed at Tshirululuni, while Ramabulana fled to a town 50 km (31 mi) to the south. In 1836 Ramabulana allied with a migrating Boer group led by Louis Tregardt. Tregardt tricked Ramavhoya into leaving Tshirululuni, where he was ambushed and strangled by Ramabulana. (Note: Venda tradition says that Ramavhoya's last words were "you will not retain the kingship, for the red ants will appear and they will consume you", with "red ants" referring to 'whites', specifically the British army.) Ramabulana assumed the kingship and offered Tregardt's group land and access to hunting grounds, but they decided to move on. In 1848 Ramabulana welcomed another Boer group led by Hendrik Potgieter who founded a settlement that later became Schoemansdal. Ramabulana expected the Boers to respect his jurisdiction, however the town became a centre for Boer power and they coerced tribute and labour from the surrounding communities. They also captured and traded slaves (exported to the east coast), and relied upon African marksman for hunting who were paid in cattle. The polity was later incorporated into the Transvaal Republic (ZAR).

Following a rapid decline in copper production, in 1864 Ramabulana closed all copper mines in the country. In that same year, Ramabulana's death caused another succession crisis. His eldest son Davhana was suspected of being involved in Ramabulana's death, and many Venda disapproved of his temperament. Ramabulana's preferred successor was his youngest son Makhado; Makhado's mother Limana was highly influential as Ramabulana's favourite wife, and her good relations with the makhadzi (a late ruler's eldest sister, who chose the successor) and khosimunene (a candidate's highest-ranking junior brother, who approved the candidacy) saw them appoint Makhado to the kingship. Having been circumcised (a new practice) and previously employed by the Boers as a marksman, he enjoyed the support of circumcised Venda and hunters. Together with his supporters, they drove Davhana out of Tshirululuni. After Makhado was installed, he moved his capital to the mountainous Luatame for its greater defensibility. Though some Boers favoured Makhado, the ZAR recognised Davhana as king and gave him refuge. The Boers also demanded that the Venda give up their firearms; Makhado refused, and forbade Venda from working for them. Makhado solicited recognition and support from the Tshivhase and Mphaphuli dynasties, as well as from the Lobedu (under Queen Maselekwane). While he did this, the Boers continued to expand by settling and claiming land, and in 1865 they and Davhana attacked a town and killed ~90 people (including the makhadzi), taking women and children as slaves. Raiding broke out, and Makhado's Venda pushed the Boers back to Schoemansdal. After a series of failed attacks and their failure to get support from the ZAR, the Boers deserted Schoemansdal in 1867 before the khosimunene's forces descended on the town and destroyed it.Meanwhile, in Ha Tshivhase a succession conflict ensued after Luvhengo Mukhese's death in 1865, ending with Ligegise's ascension to the kingship in 1867. Following the destruction of Schoemansdal, the ZAR struggled to raise significant armies, leading them to entice Gazan and Swazi forces in 1869 to embark on campaigns against Makhado. These were repelled; the ZAR sued for peace but were rebuked by Makhado and most mahosi. Some minor mahosi signed an agreement to be under the ZAR's jurisdiction and pay tribute as subjects, which the ZAR treated as conclusive though they were unable to enforce it. During the second half of the 19th century, Venda rulers built stone walls with gun loops (mutzheto) around high-ground settlements, which included encircling commoners in contrast to musanda walls which demarcated areas for the elite.

In 1872 Tshivhase ruler Ligegise accepted the establishment of a mission station in his territory by the Berlin Missionary Society, as did several mahosi, though Makhado refused. Settler presence remained outside of Ramabulana country (Ha Ramabulana), and Makhado continued to strengthen his defences. Though wary of a possible intervention by Makhado, the ZAR declared war on Sekhukhune's Pedi Kingdom in 1876, only to be repelled. In 1877 the British annexed the ZAR. Makhado met with the British commissioners later that same year and recognised British governance up to the Limpopo, seeking better relations than he had had with the Boers, though the British eschewed delineating boundaries for the time being. They later exchanged gifts, and the commissioner largely respected his autonomy. Though Makhado paid some tax (which Venda instead viewed as tribute (luvha)), he continued to assert de facto sovereignty. In 1881 after an uprising, the Boers regained control of the ZAR (though under British suzerainty). Though this saw a return to hostile relations, the Venda viewed the ejection of the British as a short-term positive for their security, since only they had been able to conquer the Pedi and Zulu kingdoms. Makhado and other rulers rejected Boer attempts to impose their rule, and Makhado firmly refused to pay taxes and also forbade his mahosi from doing so. From 1881 to 1883, drought and famine hit Soutpansberg, particularly the lands of the Tshivhase and Mphaphuli rulers in the east; Makhado capitalised on this and subjugated some of their mahosi, growing his power. In the following years, the ZAR passed several laws aiming to further 'white' settlement and disenfranchise Africans. A political conflict ensued as the ZAR attempted to set boundaries ("locations") that would isolate individual mahosi and break the political networks of the state, enabling their subjugation, while Makhado sought to consolidate and expand his administration and authority to establish impenetrable borders. Makhado, having conventionally defined the size of his state by the many subordinate rulers, found arbitrary border-lines unnatural. The Boer's Land Commission estimated the state's core to cover 15,420 km^{2} (5,950 sq mi), but because of the impossibility of meeting tax collection targets for that land they offered Makhado only 514 km^{2} (198 sq mi), which he seemingly ignored. (Note: The ZAR's targets for tax collection in an area the size of Makhado's core was £150,000 (equivalent to about £17,052,615 in 2025) annually, though over the previous six years they had only received £384 (equivalent to about £43,655 in 2025).)

In 1889 the sons of Mphaphuli ruler Ranwedzi, Makwarela and Tshikalange, warred with each other to be in line for the kingship. Ligegise Tshivhase and Ranwedzi sided with Makwarela, and they expelled Tshikalange. By 1891, Makwarela's relations with Ligegise had deteriorated and Ligegise came to support Tshikalange, while Makhado supported Makwarela. After a series of battles Makwarela and Makhado were victorious. Ligegise offered allegiance to the ZAR (still harbouring Davhana, who died in 1894), though the Boers did not want open war. In 1894 the Boers warred against other northern kings successfully due to new weaponry, yet Makhado maintained opposition to the ZAR's delineation and division of his territory (keeping the vague status quo border of the Doorn and Sand rivers), a position echoed by his mahosi.

While the ZAR was tentatively considering a military campaign, Makhado died in 1895, allegedly poisoned by his uncle, advisor, and principal wife Nwaphunga. The latter two had expressed discontent about Makhado's hard-line policy, and historian Lindsay Braun says that it may have been to "allow the pursuit of a more conciliatory attitude towards the ZAR". The three alleged conspirators supported Maemu (Nwaphungu's son and Makhado's allegedly-favoured successor) who was quickly installed despite not having support of senior mahosi nor the makhadzi. They supported Mphephu (who was away from Luatame at the time), son of Midana who was Makhado's "great wife" because the brideprice had been paid with royal cattle (dzekiso) and likely had close relations with the makhadzi. A third candidate was Sinthumule who had been sent to Tuli (in modern-day Zimbabwe) as Makhado's representative to the British South Africa Company (BSAC). The weakness of Maemu's authority saw him submit to the ZAR and seek their support. Mphephu and Sinthumule were quickly recalled and together with the mahosi they drove Maemu and his supporters out and installed Mphephu. Maemu was given refuge in the ZAR. Mphephu initially maintained cordial relations with the ZAR, though following a dispute with Sinthumule they turned hostile as Sinthumule sided with the Boers and Maemu. A drought between 1895 and 1897 was accompanied by locusts, which raised food prices, and commercial trade induced raiding and insecurity. Cattle disease also arrived in 1897 and killed over 90% of cattle, as around a third of the population died or were displaced. During this the ZAR enacted laws to further disenfranchise Africans, including prohibiting African sharecropping and enacting a large hut tax. In 1897 Ranwedzi Mphaphuli and Makwarela attempted to pry the Ravhura and Luvhimbi polities from Tshivhase influence, however they were defeated. Meanwhile, Mphephu repeatedly denied the ZAR's attempts to delineate his land and deported any representatives. In 1898, after attaining the neutrality of other Venda and Tswana groups, the ZAR invaded Mphephu's Ha Ramabulana accompanied by artillery. As part of a predetermined plan, Mphephu fled with a thousand-person party to the BSAC, who settled them at Vhuxwa. Meanwhile Boers dynamited Luatame and established a town named after Tregardt where Tshirululuni once was. The ZAR appointed Sinthumule as 'king' and began delineating mahosi's lands.

In 1899 war broke out between the ZAR and the BSAC; by 1900 the British had captured Pretoria and Bloemfontein. The Soutpansberg remained low-priority for the British and, absent the ZAR's authority, Venda returned to their homes and farms. Accompanied by mahosi and some British soldiers, Mphephu left for Luatame in 1901, aiming to reassume the kingship and make the British indebted to him by participating in the war. Mphephu's widespread support and transgressions against Sinthumule and Maemu lost him favour with the British and they convinced him to be exiled to Pretoria, afterwards returning to Vhuxwa with the intention of coming back when the conflict ended. Ligegise Tshivhase and Ranwedzi Mphaphuli both died in the early 1900s. The war ended in 1902 with the British victorious. Despite hope the British would allow Venda to remain on their ancestral lands, they reinforced Boer claims over western Soutpansberg and enforced a hut tax, provoking resistance. The deferral of Mphephu's return, while allowing his enemies and Boers to, symbolised British hypocrisy and injustice for the Venda. Just as the local administrators were preparing to recognise Sinthumule in 1904, Mphephu travelled out of Rhodesia with mahosi without British knowledge of his whereabouts, stopping at Luatame to gather his advisors before arriving at Pietersburg. Forcing the decision of his return, Mphephu submitted to the British, having chosen Pietersburg to bypass unfavourable officials. Fear of a Venda uprising caused the British to allow Mphephu's return to Ha Ramabulana, and he was settled in the Nzehelele Valley, near the old capital of Dzata, with set boundaries. Mphephu and many Venda settled at the old capital of Luatame to be near to royal graves despite it being outside his designated land and allocated to 'white' settlers. Following a dispute with the British, Mphephu left Luatame in 1906 though continued to appeal.

=== Colonial and postcolonial periods ===
The British Transvaal Colony was incorporated into the Union of South Africa in 1910. In 1913, the government passed the Native Land Act which restricted African settlement to dedicated reserves, while the Native Affairs Act of 1920 legislated the founding of local councils to advise the government. Mphephu died in 1925 and was succeeded to the Ramabulana kingship by his son, George Mbulaheni Ramabulana. Patrick Mphephu assumed the kingship in 1949 after his father's death, chosen ahead of his brother by the makhadzi and khosimunene. Prior to his ascension, P. Mphephu had become odious of whites' treatment of blacks, and frustrated by the lack of distinction made between commoners and royals. According to Lufuno Mulaudzi, from the outset P. Mphephu sought to unify all Venda under his rule, and achieve independence in order to free them from white domination. From 1948 when the National Party came to power, the South African government took steps towards strengthening and enforcing their policy of racial segregation known as apartheid, and sought to restrict Africans to the 1913 reserves with endorsement from subordinate traditional leaders. The latter comprised the "grand apartheid" envisioned by Hendrik Verwoerd which involved complete racial segregation, and culminated in the founding of 'bantustans'. From 1951, P. Mphephu was appointed to lead various increasingly-devolved native authorities, with elections held from 1973, until the establishment of the Venda bantustan in 1979. Despite the illusion of independence, bantustans were economically, militarily, and judicially dependent on the central government, and though the devolution of development was attractive to traditional leaders, it entrenched ethnic divisions and made such leaders deeply unpopular.

The 1973 elections in Venda were primarily contested between P. Mphephu's Venda National Party (VNP) and the Venda Independence People's Party (VIPP) for 18 seats in the legislative assembly (42 seats were given to traditional leaders, with the system designed to counter revolutionary politics). Both parties supported independence, although the VIPP sought to 'modernise' and Westernise the government while traditional leaders sought to protect their status. VIPP won the most seats in the election amid a turnout of 72%, though only held 10 seats in the 60-seat assembly. For the 1978 elections, the number of elected seats was increased to 42 for a total of 84 and the VIPP renamed itself to "Venda Independent Party" (VIP). The VIP's manifesto was radical in its opposition to apartheid and support for a democratic government. Despite Venda being threatened by VNP members and whites to vote VNP or lose their jobs etc., the VIP won the most seats. P. Mphephu banned newspapers from reporting the results and only appointed VNP candidates to his cabinet. In 1979, previously having been "Chief Minister", P. Mphephu was appointed Khosikhulu (king) of Venda by the central government to consolidate his dominance, and that same year he became President of the Venda Bantustan. In the years following the 1978 elections Mphephu had members of opposition parties regularly arrested, and a death in 1981 caused by police brutality made him highly unpopular with the public. The death of VIP leader Baldwin Mudau in 1982 caused riots incensed by alleged government involvement. Mphephu began replacing traditional leaders sympathetic to the VIP, and the legislature declared him "Life President" in 1983. In the 1984 elections, amid alleged electoral fraud, the VIP only won 4 seats, and the candidates all resigned in protest. In 1986 Venda transitioned into a one-party state, though this didn't stem the persecution of political opponents and Lutheran priests, and incited threats of attacks.

P. Mphephu died unexpectedly in 1988 of an undisclosed illness. South African foreign minister Pik Botha paid tribute saying "The President of Venda, Mr Khosikhulu PR Mphephu, would be remembered as a loyal friend of South Africa who believed in co-operation rather than confrontation and who took a firm stand against terrorism". Frank Ravele succeeded P. Mphephu as president and continued his policies despite hope among the public for change and the enthronement of Kennedy Tshivhase and other dethroned chiefs. Young people held regular protests and became more militant. In 1990, around the time Nelson Mandela was released and negotiations were being held to end apartheid, general Gabriel Ramushwana led a successful coup against Ravele's government. Ramushwana abolished the Venda kingship (reducing the Ramabulana leaders to rulers of western Soutpansberg). In 1994 the Venda bantustan was incorporated into South Africa.

A series of commissions attempted to determine a solution to disputes over Venda kingship, culminating in the Nhlapo Commission, endorsed by President Jacob Zuma, which decided that the Ramabulana leaders were the rightful holders of the Venda kingship, putting Toni Mphephu in line to be king; attempts to challenge this by the Tshivhase and Mphaphuli leaders were dismissed by the courts. In 2012 a dispute over the Ramabulana kingship ensued, as Masindi Mphephu (daughter and only child of the previous Ramabulana leader) and Mbulaheni Mphephu submitted a court application claiming Masindi was the rightful monarch, and that if women were excluded then Mbulaheni was next in line. The application also wanted the practice of excluding women from traditional leadership to be declared unconstitutional. Toni Mphephu was the ndumi (younger brother and assistant leader) of the prior leader, and ndumi were not traditionally made successors. The Ramabulana royal house argued that women were traditionally excluded from leadership, despite there being several female leaders. In 2017 the local High Court dismissed Masindi's claim, though Toni's installation was delayed further by her application to the Supreme Court of Appeal (SCA) in Bloemfontein. In this application she alleged Zuma favoured Toni in order to obtain a R8.5 million (US$575101) loan from Venda Building Society Mutual Bank (in which Toni was indirectly a major shareholder). The SCA declared the 2010 decision to recognise Toni unconstitutional, and referred the case back to the local High Court under a new judge. It also stated the decision was based on gender discrimination, and recommended that the National House of Traditional Leaders advise the new decision. In 2019 the National House stated that Masindi was the rightful Queen of the Venda. As of 2025 the dispute remains unresolved.

== Government ==
The state was headed by a Khosikhulu ("king"). A successor for the kingship (vhuhosivhuhulu) was chosen among princes by the late ruler's eldest sister (makhadzi), and was usually approved by the highest-ranking junior brother (khosimunene), though succession disputes (muvhango) sometimes occurred and this was sometimes contravened. An ndumi is a brother of the ruler that is appointed as assistant ruler (and usually the khosimunene to the ruler's successor). Singo kings initially claimed descent from Nwali (God), though over time this was dropped. The court was called khoro, though final judicial decisions were made above it in the ruler's area. Thomas Huffman and Edwin Hanisch write that the state's hierarchy likely increased from family heads and ward headmen to petty chiefs, senior chiefs, and the paramount chief/king. The makhadzi of leaders served as the female representatives of ruling dynasties and held considerable power, while also taking care of leaders' protective charms.

== Society and culture ==
Singo traditions portray the pre-Singo mitupo (totem-affiliated clans) as stateless "ignorant savages" and consider themselves to have been the first Venda, contrary to what historical research has found. Mitupo are believed to comprise kin (either royal or commoner), and share a tradition of origin, oath, taboos, burial custom, and praise and chiefly rituals. Pre-Singo dynasties' settlements in the Soutpansberg were located on hilltops and high ground, while the Singo settled the plains. Elites lived within stone-walled areas called misanda (sing. musanda). Settlements that adhered to the Central Cattle Pattern layout (where the cattle kraal is at the centre by the headman's house) were rare among the Venda and limited to the pre-Singo, and Venda informants maintain that no royalty could have lived somewhere without stone walls. Settlements that adhered to the Zimbabwe Pattern in Soutpansberg (which were composed of some semi-circle stone walls, one of which, the musanda, demarcated the royal enclosure, behind which was the royal rainmaking area and guards ("eyes"), while nearby was the council area or tshivhambo) are associated with prominent dynasties of the pre-Singo. The rainmaking Mbedzi dynasty, Luvhimbi, was seated in Tshaluvhimbi before moving slightly south to Tshitaka-lsha-Makoleni or Makoleni.

The Singo capital of Dzata followed the Zimbabwe Pattern, though not all of its walls were fully coursed. Its musanda was over 4,500 m^{2} (48,000 sq ft), and the residential area covered around 500,000 m^{2} (5,400,000 sq ft). The Ngoma Lungundu drum is said to have been kept in Dzata's tshivhambo. Mountains (thavha) are more prestigious places for a mutupo's rulers to be buried than pools (tivha), and a mutupo's traditions claimed its origin at a mountain or pool. Pools were associated with a ruler's power over procreation, while mountains were associated with political power. This affected the layout of settlements, with the elites on higher ground ('mountain'), and commoners on lower ground ('pool'). Some mitupo who were subjects of both the pre-Singo and Singo, such as the Dzivhani, buried their leaders on dry land (zwiomo, "dry ones"), and were regarded as "sorcerers [witches] who lost their potency but yet managed to permeate certain areas with malignant anti-social powers", retaining some power due to having been Soutpansberg's original inhabitants. The Mbedzi initially worshiped their high-god, Raluvhimba, at a cave-shrine. After the Singo's arrival, the names Raluvhimba and Mwari came to be used synonymously.

Cattle conferred social status and wealth; before the early-19th century most cattle were likely owned by a few elites. Copper jewellery was only worn by prominent Singo leaders and Lemba. Ivory jewellery was similarly only worn by elite women, and was used for royal brideprice. At least in the 19th century, the king was entitled to the tusk that touched the ground when the elephant died. Brideprice was generally paid in cattle (larger amounts for higher status) which was usually gained from receiving brideprices or from raiding (meaning cattle accumulated among the leaders). Some poorer commoners paid in iron hoes. Some women could own cattle and use them to gain wives. While female leaders tended to be rainmakers, some held the position due to descending from a high-status matrilineal line. The Singo elite were associated with Shona culture and commoners often with Sotho culture, causing some commoners to adopt Singo identity, and some mitupo even changed their totem to that of the Singo.

At Dzata, the Luvhimbi rulers organised domba. Domba is a Venda rite of passage for both girls and boys held after their puberty rituals, following which they enter adulthood. It lasted for 9–12 months and involved them working for a sponsor (chief or headman) in the day, and having lessons (milayo) in the night. Domba also included a 'python dance', with this and the lessons taught by ritual specialists in dedicated enclosures. Milayo consisted of proverbs, riddles, dances, physical exercise, songs, and dramas, with figurines used as teaching aids, and sought to teach people societal values. Thomas Huffman writes that in early times Sotho children would have gone to these schools due to Shona dynasties holding authority, possibly contributing to their integration and the formation of Venda identity. It is generally thought that the practice of male circumcision (murundu) was introduced to the western Venda in the 1860s before gaining popularity, though Huffman says that it may have a longer history.

In the present day, Venda traditionalists continue to visit ancestral burial grounds annually (despite them often being on Afrikaner-owned land in western Soutpansberg), and perform the Tshikona dance accompanied by flutes, believed to draw their ancestors out from the mountains or pools. Ramabulana and Ramavhoya were buried in the cattle kraal of Tshirululuni, while Makhado was buried "behind Lutshindwi Mountain".

== List of rulers ==
=== Ramabulana dynasty ===
The following is a regnal list of the Ramabulana Singo dynasty:

Ruler	Reign	Notes
Mpofu	?–c. 1830	-
Ramavhoya	c. 1830–1836	-
Ramabulana	1836–1864	-
Makhado	1864–1895	-
Maemu	1895	-
Mphephu	1895–1925	Sinthumule was appointed king by the ZAR in 1898
George Mbulaheni	1925–1949	-
Patrick Mphephu	1950–1988	-
Vacant	1988–1994	Phophi Mphephu (the makhadzi) as regent
Tshimangadzo Dimbanyika Mphephu	1994–1997	-
Toni Mphephu	1998–2012	-
Disputed	2012–present (as of 2025)	Disputed between Toni Mphephu and Masindi Mphephu

=== Tshivhase dynasty ===
The following is a regnal list of the Tshivhase dynasty according to Jude Fokwang:

Ruler	Reign	Notes
Raluswielo Tshivhase	c. 1780–?	Brother of Thohoyandou
Mukesi Tshivhase (also "Luvhengo")	?–1865	-
Ligegise Tshivhase	1867–1901	-
Ramaremisa Tshivhase	c. 1901–c. 1931	-
Ratshimphi Tshivhase	c. 1931–1946	-
Thohoyandou Tshivhase	c. 1946–c. 1970	-
Kennedy Tshivhase	1970–present (as of 2025)	-

=== Mphaphuli dynasty ===
The following is a regnal list of the Mphaphuli dynasty:

Ruler	Reign	Notes
Tshilala Mphaphuli	?–1839	-
Madadzhe Mphaphuli	1840–1847	-
Ratsibi Mphaphuli	1848–1860	-
Ranwedzi Mphaphuli	1861–1903	-
Makwarela Mphaphuli	1904–1925	-
Phaswana Mphaphuli	1927–1948	-
Makhado Mphaphuli	1948–1950	-
Magwedzha Mphaphuli	1951–1966	-
Vacant	1966–1970	Muhanelwa (the makhadzi) as regent
Mpandeli Mphaphuli	1970–1975	-
Vacant	1975–1990	Mpfumedzeni Mphaphuli as regent
Musiiwa Mphaphuli	1990–present (as of 2024)	-
