= Joyce Bila =

South African politician (born 1966)

The Honourable Joyce Bila MP

Member of the National Assembly

Assembly Member for Limpopo
- Incumbent
- Assumed office 14 June 2024

Mayor of Collins Chabane Local Municipality
- In office August 2016 – December 2018
- Preceded by: Municipality established
- Succeeded by: Moses Maluleke

Personal details
- Born: 6 April 1966 (age 60)
- Citizenship: South Africa
- Party: African National Congress

Tintswalo Joyce Bila (born 6 April 1966) is a South African politician from Limpopo. She has represented the African National Congress in the National Assembly of South Africa since June 2024. She was formerly the inaugural mayor of the Collins Chabane Local Municipality between August 2016 and December 2018.

During Bila's term as Collins Chabane mayor, the municipality illegally deposited R120-million with VBS Mutual Bank, an amount it forfeited after the bank collapsed. The ANC removed Bila from her mayoral office during the ensuing scandal.

== Early life and career ==
Bila was born on 6 April 1966.

== Mayor of Collins Chabane: 2016–2018 ==
She rose to prominence after the 2016 local elections, when she was elected as mayor of the newly established Collins Chabane Local Municipality in northeastern Limpopo. Initially referred to only as LIM345, the municipality was established by merging portions of the Makhado Local Municipality and Thulamela Local Municipality to create a new subdistrict that included Malamulele, Hlanganani, and Vuwani; in Vuwani in particular, the move was vociferously opposed. A member of the African National Congress (ANC), Bila was elected as the inaugural mayor after the election in August 2016, and she was formally inaugurated in a ceremony on 29 October 2016.

In October 2018 City Press reported that Bila's tenure in the mayoral office was insecure. A month later, the VBS Mutual Bank was liquidated amid a major political scandal; the bank had become insolvent after defrauding its depositors, who included several Limpopo municipalities. After an investigation concluded that the municipal deposits had been illegal under public finance law, the Provincial Executive Committee of the ANC in Limpopo announced on 11 December 2018 that it would remove seven mayors from office in affected municipalities. Bila was one of them; under her leadership, Collins Chabane had deposited and lost an investment of R120 million. Bila's municipal manager and chief financial officer were suspended from their positions.

Shortly after the ANC's announcement, the Hawks confirmed that it was pursuing a criminal investigation into Bila and the six other sacked mayors, amid indications that some Limpopo politicians had received kickbacks in exchange for keeping municipal money deposited at VBS. According to the Limpopo Mirror, Bila denied that she had approved the Collins Chabane investment, saying that the decision had been taken by the municipal manager and chief financial officer.

Moses Maluleke was elected to replace her as Collins Chabane mayor in December 2018. Bila returned to the municipality as an ordinary councillor in the November 2021 local elections. She later moved to the council of the Vhembe District Municipality, where in November 2023 she was appointed to Mayor Tsakani Nkondo's Mayoral Committee as Member of the Mayoral Committee for Local Economic Development and Planning.

== National Assembly: 2024–present ==
In the May 2024 general election, Bila stood as a parliamentary candidate, ranked 15th on the ANC's party list for the Limpopo constituency. She was elected to a seat in the National Assembly, the lower house of the South African Parliament. She was appointed as a member of Parliament's Standing Committee on Public Accounts and Standing Committee on the Auditor-General.
