= Tshenuwani Farisani =

South African politician, theologian and minister (1948–2025)

Member of the National Assembly
- In office 2009–2010
- President: Jacob Zuma

Speaker of the Limpopo Provincial Legislature
- In office April 2004 – April 2009
- Premier: Sello Moloto; Cassel Mathale
- Preceded by: Robert Malavi
- Succeeded by: Rudolph Phala

Member of the Limpopo Executive Council
- In office July 1997 – April 2004
- Premier: Ngoako Ramatlhodi

President of the Black People's Convention
- In office 1973–1975
- Preceded by: Winnie Kgware
- Succeeded by: Hlaku Kenneth Rachidi

Personal details
- Born: Tshenuwani Simon Farisani; 30 August 1947 Transvaal, South Africa
- Died: 29 May 2025 (aged 77)
- Party: African National Congress
- Other political affiliations: South African Communist Party
- Occupation: Politician; Lutheran minister; theologian; anti-apartheid activist

Tshenuwani Simon Farisani (30 August 1947 – 29 May 2025) was a South African politician, theologian and Lutheran minister. During apartheid, he was one of the country's most prominent black clergymen and preached anti-apartheid liberation theology from his diocese in Venda and Transvaal. He founded the Black Evangelic Youth Organisation with Cyril Ramaphosa in the early 1970s and was also active in the Black Consciousness movement, especially as president of the Black People's Convention from 1973 to 1975. He was arrested on four occasions, according to Amnesty International as a prisoner of conscience, and he testified abroad about the torture he was subjected to by the apartheid police.

After the end of apartheid, Farisani represented the African National Congress in the Limpopo Provincial Legislature and National Assembly. He was a Member of the Executive Council in the Limpopo provincial government under the inaugural Premier of Limpopo, Ngoako Ramatlhodi, from 1997 to 2004, and from 2004 to 2009 he was Speaker of the Limpopo Provincial Legislature.

== Early life and career ==
Tshenuwani Simon Farisani was born on 30 August 1947 in the region of the Transvaal province that became Limpopo. His father was a farmer and traditional healer and during apartheid his family was forcibly resettled several times. Farisani was a "brilliant" student and enrolled in theological college to prepare for ordainment as a minister in the Evangelical Lutheran Church. He subscribed to a radical political interpretation of Christianity, aligned with the black or liberation theology that was ascendant in South Africa in the 1960s and 1970s. In particular, Farisani argued strongly that apartheid was not God-given but was a manmade atrocity and that Lutheranism should not be a conservative political force but a force for the liberation of the oppressed. In 1972, he was expelled from the Lutheran Theological College at Umphumulo in Natal for rebelling against its conservative teachings.

By then, Farisani was a prominent activist in the burgeoning Black Consciousness movement and frequently travelled the country conducting a mixture of political mobilisation and Christian evangelism. He had met a teenaged Cyril Ramaphosa, later a prominent trade unionist and a post-apartheid President of South Africa, while acting as a guest speaker at the debating society of Ramaphosa's boarding school, Mpaphuli High School in the bantustan of Venda. Together, Ramaphosa and Farisani had established the Black Evangelic Youth Organisation (BEYO), chaired by Ramaphosa and deputy chaired by Farisani. In the early 1970s, student members of BEYO conducted evangelical tours of rural villages in the region around Sibasa, and the organisation expanded in size and scope, becoming the Bold Evangelic Youth Organisation (once it began admitting whites) and then the Bold Evangelic Christian Association (once it began admitting adults). According to Ramaphosa's biographer Anthony Butler, Farisani became an important mentor to Ramaphosa and a major influence on his political thought.

In addition, Farisani succeeded Winnie Kgware as president of the Black Consciousness-aligned Black People's Convention (BPC) from 1973 to 1975. He resigned from the BPC in 1975 when he was ordained in the Evangelical Lutheran Church in Southern Africa. In the 1980s, he became a dean and deputy bishop in the church's northern diocese, which included the Venda bantustan and some areas of neighbouring Transvaal. According to the Washington Post and Africa Report, he was considered a frontrunner to succeed Beyers Naudé as secretary general of the South African Council of Churches.

== Detention ==
Because of his anti-apartheid activism, Farisani attracted the attention of Venda Police forces and the Security Branch of the South African Police. Between 1977 and 1987, he was detained without trial on four separate occasions. On the first occasion in March 1977, he was arrested and detained for two days in Howick, Natal on suspicion of fomenting the 1976 Soweto Uprising and helping activists flee the country into exile. He said that police officers tortured him, including by dangling him from a third-floor window and suspending him from a pole. He was detained again later in 1977 and held into 1978.

His third detention began in November 1981, when he and nineteen others (including three other clergymen) were arrested in connection with the bombing of a Sibasa police station in October of that year. Farisani was held until June 1982 and subjected to further torture. Tshifhiwa Muofhe, a friend of Farisani who had been arrested with him, died in detention; an inquest in July 1982 determined that he had been tortured to death by policemen. The case attracted the attention of Amnesty International, which launched an international letter-writing campaign that helped secure Farisani's release.

Upon his release, Farisani sued the Venda government for damages, claiming that he had suffered two heart attacks as a result of his torture, and the government paid him R6,500 (about $5,000) in a pre-trial settlement. He was released without charge and always denied involvement in the 1981 bombing, saying that he was at a church meeting in Johannesburg at the time of the attack. In 1986, at the request of Amnesty International, he travelled to Europe and the United States to testify about his torture, telling several audiences, including an American congressional subcommittee, that he had been beaten unconscious and given electric shocks by the Venda security police.

Farisani was arrested by the apartheid police for a final time on 22 November 1986, shortly after returning from his international trip. His detention attracted international attention; Amnesty International designated him a "prisoner of conscience" and sent a representative to Venda to work for his release. On 1 January 1987, he began a hunger strike in his cell, which he maintained until his release on 20 January. In February, the apartheid government declared him a "prohibited immigrant", a designation which effectively confined him to the Venda bantustan, obliging him to apply for a visa if he wished to cross into white South Africa. Later in 1987, he travelled to the United States for treatment at the Center for Victims of Torture in Minneapolis, and he subsequently went into exile abroad. In 1996, he testified about his experience in detention at the Truth and Reconciliation Commission.

== Post-apartheid career ==
In South Africa's first democratic elections in 1994, Farisani was elected to represent the African National Congress (ANC) in the new National Assembly. In July 1997, Ngoako Ramatlhodi, in his capacity as Premier of Limpopo (then known as Northern Province), appointed Farisani as Member of the Executive Council (MEC) for Agriculture in the Limpopo provincial government. During this period, Farisani was also a member of the ANC Provincial Executive Committee in Limpopo; in 1998, he was elected as provincial treasurer (under Ramatlhodi as provincial chairperson) and served in that position until the committee's dissolution in 2001. In June 1999, following the 1999 general election, Ramatlhodi reshuffled his executive and appointed Farisani MEC for Transport and Public Roads. He retained that portfolio until 2004, when, following the 2004 general election, he was appointed Speaker of the Limpopo Provincial Legislature.

He left the provincial Speaker position after the 2009 general election, in which he was elected to return to the National Assembly. He also became chairperson of the assembly's Portfolio Committee on Arts and Culture. However, he resigned his seat in late 2010. He denied rumours that he had been pushed out to free up the seat for a younger ANC politician, saying that he had resigned voluntarily to devote more time to his ministerial duties. He remained an active preacher in Limpopo and was also an active member of the South African Communist Party (SACP); he was SACP regional treasurer in the Vhembe region as of 2019.

== Personal life and death ==
Farisani was married to Regina. He died on 29 May 2025, at the age of 77.

== Honours ==
In September 2022, the Dr Tshenuwani Farisani Development Foundation was launched in Farisani's honour in Thohoyandou, Limpopo. In November of that year, he received an honorary doctorate in theology from the University of Venda.

== Selected publications ==
- Farisani, Tshenuwani Simon (1987). Diary from a South African Prison. Fortress Press. ISBN 978-0-8006-2062-2.
- Farisani, Tshenuwani Simon (1990). In Transit: Between the Image of God and the Image of Man. W.B. Eerdmans. ISBN 978-0-8028-0438-9.
