= National Peacekeeping Force =

Defunct peacekeeping force from South Africa

- Founded: November 1993
- Disbanded: June 1994

Leadership
- Commander-in-Chief: Gabriel Ramushwana

Expenditure
- Budget: R385.5 million (1994) (equivalent to R1.97 billion or US$149.03 million in 2018)

Related articles
- History: Military history of South Africa

The National Peacekeeping Force (NPKF) was a short-lived South African peacekeeping force created in the run-up to the first multi-racial, universal suffrage elections in 1994. Its purpose was to address the various security concerns and maintain peace during this transitional period.

== History ==
=== Origin ===
In 1992, the Goldstone Commission observed that there was mistrust amongst populace of the existing Apartheid-era security forces. On 2 June 1993, the Technical Committee on Violence of the Multiparty Negotiating Process recommended "the establishment of an independent peacekeeping force with a multi-party composition to function as the primary peacekeeping force for the elections". In August 1993, a provision for a national peacekeeping force had been incorporated into a draft Transitional Executive Council bill. The bill was enacted by the Tricameral Parliament in September 1993 but was not in effect until November 1993. In February 1994, the TEC requested from the Commonwealth assistance in training the NPKF; the Commonwealth Peacekeeping Assistance Group consisted of 33 members from 7 countries tasked with advising and training the NPKF.

=== Formation ===
The National Peacekeeping Force was formed by merging personnel from the SADF, uMkhonto we Sizwe, the various bantustan security forces and the SAP. The SAP was initially excluded from the planning process due to its Internal Stability Unit's conduct within townships. Allegations against the Internal Stability Unit is one of the reasons that prompted the formation of a peacekeeping force.

Participants in the NPKF included:

- South African Defence Force
- South African Police
- uMkhonto we Sizwe
- Transkei Defence Force and its police force
- Venda Defence Force and its police force
- Ciskei Defence Force and its police force
- Kwandebele Police Force
- Gazankulu Police Force
- Lebowa Police Force
- KaNgwane Police Force
- QwaQwa Police Force

Initially, a figure between 2000 and 30 000 personnel had been proposed. But due to the short time constraint and limited accommodation 3 743 personnel in 3 battalions were inducted on 24 January 1994. On 19 February 1993, a further 1 200 recruits were the last personnel to be inducted; for a total of 4 943. On 25 March 1994, a plan to add an additional 5000 was scrapped.

SAP members amounted to 197.

=== Head of the Force ===
In March 1993, Nelson Mandela proposed a peacekeeping force be placed under UN supervision with possibly a foreign commander. Two candidates, Brigadier George Kruys from the SADF and Brigadier Derek Mgwebi from the Transkei Defence Force were shortlisted. As neither candidate had adequate support and a foreign commander was ruled out, the Transitional Executive Council (TEC) named Brigadier Gabriel Ramushwana as commander on 8 February 1994. This was met with objections as Ramushwana had in April 1990 overthrown the democratically elected government of President Frank Ravele and established a military government in Venda.

=== Mandate ===
The NPKF was charged with keeping the peace in volatile areas. Lawyers for Human Rights suggested the NPKF be deployed during the 1994 Bophuthatswana crisis. But on 12 March 1994, Lucas Mangope was deposed and the TEC deployed the NPKF to the East Rand.

=== Disbandment ===
On 2 June 1994, the NPKF was officially disbanded.

== Incidents ==
On 18 April 1994, nine days before the elections, the NPKF shot and killed two children and Ken Oosterbroek, a photojournalist covering a clash between peacekeepers, the African National Congress and the Inkatha Freedom Party in Thokoza.

== See also ==
- Military history of South Africa
- United Nations Observer Mission in South Africa
