= Makumeke =

- Location within Limpopo Location within South Africa
- Coordinates: 22.981°S 30.634°E
- Country: South Africa
- Province: Limpopo
- District: Vhembe
- Municipality: Thulamela
- Main Place: Thohoyandou

Area
  - Total: 0.99 km^{2} (0.38 sq mi)

Population (2011)
  - Total: 1,429
  - Density: 1,400/km^{2} (3,700/sq mi)

Racial makeup (2011)
  - Black African: 99.8%
  - White: 0.2%

First languages (2011)
  - Tsonga: 98.0%
  - Other: 2.0%
- Time zone: UTC+2 (SAST)

Makumeke (Xitsonga, "one who is found") is a small village in the Thulamela local municipality, approximately 9 km (5.6 miles) from Malamlele Township in northern South Africa.

== Geography ==
Makumeke is near or on five rivers: the large Rivhubye River, the intermittent river Ngholombi and rivulets Sanavi, Hlantswatindyelo, and Mitlhwari. The latter three flow through the community's north side.

== Demographics ==
Makumeke has a population of 1,429 people based on the 2011 census. The population is made up of 804 Females and 625 males. 99.79% of the population are Black African and 0.21% are white. The main language spoken here is Xitsonga.

== Facilities ==
Makumeke consists of residences, a primary school, a daycare, a general store, a cafe and several spaza shops. The village has running water and electricity.

== Economy ==
Makumeke suffers from high unemployment. Most of its families live below the poverty line.
