= 1984 Venda parliamentary election =

Parliamentary elections were held in July 1984 in Venda, an independent bantustan in what is now Limpopo province of South Africa. The Venda National Party won 41 of the 45 elected seats in the Legislative Assembly.

== Results ==
Party	Seats	+/–
Venda National Party	41	+30
Venda Independence People's Party	4	–27
Total	45	–
Source: African Elections Database
