= Maranzhe =

- Location within Limpopo Location within South Africa
- Coordinates: 22.918°S 30.374°E
- Country: South Africa
- Province: Limpopo
- District: Vhembe
- Municipality: Thulamela

Area
  - Total: 3.61 km^{2} (1.39 sq mi)

Population (2011)
  - Total: 1,764
  - Density: 489/km^{2} (1,270/sq mi)

Racial makeup (2011)
  - Black African: 99.9%
  - Indian/Asian: 0.1%

First languages (2011)
  - Venda: 97.5%
  - English: 1.2%
  - Other: 1.3%
- Time zone: UTC+2 (SAST)
- Website: www.maranzhe.co.za

Maranzhe is a village in Vhembe District Municipality in the Limpopo province of South Africa.

There are two schools at Maranzhe. Maranzhe Primary School (murangoni primary) and Luphai Secondary School.
