= 1990 Venda coup d'état =

Bloodless military coup d'état in Venda

- Map of Venda (red) within South Africa.
- Date: 5 April 1990; 36 years ago
- Location: (Venda (Bantustan)) Thohoyandou
- Type: Military coup
- Motive: Regime change
- Target: NPV–led government of Frank Ravele
- Organised by: Gabriel Ramushwana
- Participants: Venda Defence Force (faction)
- Outcome: Coup succeeds: The overthrow of government of President Ravele.; The establishment of military rule under the Council of National Unity headed by Colonel Ramushwana.

The 1990 Venda coup d'état was a bloodless military coup in Venda, an unrecognised state and a nominally independent South African homeland for the Venda people, which took place on 5 April 1990. The coup was led by the then 48-year-old Colonel Gabriel Ramushwana, the Chief of Staff of the Venda Defence Force, against the government of President Frank Ravele (NPV).

Ramushwana's military government stayed in power until January 1994, several months before the reunification of Venda with South Africa after the first post-apartheid general election.

== See also ==
- 1987 Transkei coup d'état
- 1990 Ciskei coup d'état
- 1994 Bophuthatswana crisis
