= Tuwani Matthews Mulaudzi =

South African businessman and executive chair of Luvhomba Group (born 1970)

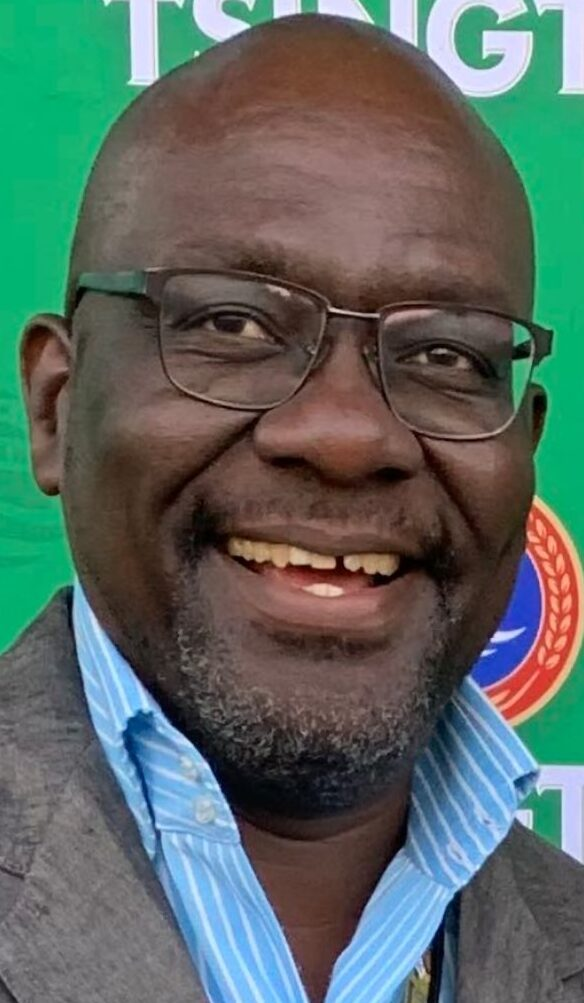
- Mulaudzi in 2022
- Born: Tuwani Matthews Mulaudzi; 7 June 1970 (age 55); Makhado, Limpopo, South Africa
- Citizenship: South African
- Occupation: Businessman
- Organization: Luvhomba Group (executive chairperson)
- Known for: Acquittal by the Commercial Crimes Court in Pretoria after facing fraud charges
- Spouse: Violet Mabontsi Mulaudzi

Tuwani Matthews Mulaudzi is a South African businessman and former lawyer who serves as the executive chairperson of Luvhomba Group.

He is best known for his publicised acquittal in June 2022 by the Commercial Crimes Court in Pretoria after facing fraud, theft, money laundering and racketeering charges in 2022 linked to a disputed R48 million Old Mutual investment which led to the seizure of his assets. Since his acquittal he has pursued the return of his assets and millions of rands in cash frozen by the state during the legal proceedings and has announced civil claims against the South African state institutions.

In 2024, his Luvhomba Group signed a multi-billion rand partnership memorandum of understanding with a Chinese company, Zhejiang (subsidiary of conglomerate Poly Group), in mining and defence supply.

== Old Mutual asset forfeiture case ==
In March 2011, Mulaudzi sold his investment rights he held in an Old Mutual investment policy to Nedbank Financial Planning. He received about R37.6 million for it, and Nedbank became the official owner of the policy. Old Mutual was notified of the cession, but due to an administrative error its internal records were never updated and it continued to regard Mulaudzi as the policyholder.

When the investment matured in June 2014, Old Mutual mistakenly paid the maturity value of about R48 million into a bank account owned by Mulaudzi. This created a problem because Nedbank was now the rightful owner of the investment as per the 2011 cession agreement. Once they realized that Old Mutual had paid Mulaudzi, Nedbank approached Old Mutual and demanded the payout and Old Mutual paid Nedbank the same amount in August 2014.

Because Mulaudzi had received the money first (even though it was an administrative error by Old Mutual), Old Mutual reported the incident to the police which triggered the National Prosecuting Authority (NPA) and the Asset Forfeiture Unit (AFU) to get involved, freezing Mulaudzi’s assets and millions in cash to prevent him from spending what they considered was possibly obtained illegally. However, in September 2014 the Western Cape High Court set aside the order, releasing the assets to Mulaudzi, and directed the AFU to pay legal costs.

The matter continued in the courts for several years. In June 2022 the Commercial Crimes Court in Pretoria acquitted Mulaudzi of the fraud charges laid by Old Mutual in the matter, and he made moves to sue billions for damage caused to his name. In June 2024, City Press reported that Mulaudzi filed a R5 billion lawsuit against the South African Police Service (SAPS) and the National Prosecuting Authority (NPA) for alleged unlawful prosecution. Earlier media reports also recorded his stated intention to sue then Police Minister Bheki Cele and others over losses he attributed to the case. In February 2025, IOL reported that the Supreme Court of Appeal (SCA) dismissed an attempt by creditors, liquidators, trustees and officials to keep his assets frozen, paving the way for Mulaudzi to recover his assets and cash totalling over R105 million.
