= Patrick Mphephu =

Venda politician

1st President of Venda
- In office 13 September 1979 – 17 April 1988
- Preceded by: Office established
- Succeeded by: Frank Ravele

Chief Minister of Venda
- In office 1 February 1973 – 13 September 1979
- Preceded by: Office established
- Succeeded by: Office abolished

Chief Councillor of the VhaVenda Territorial Authority
- In office c. August 1969 – 1 February 1973
- Preceded by: Office established
- Succeeded by: Office abolished

Chief Executive Councillor of the VhaVenda Territorial Authority
- In office c. 1962 – c. August 1969
- Preceded by: Office established
- Succeeded by: Office abolished

Personal details
- Born: Patrick Ramaano Mphephu c. 1924 Dzanani, Transvaal, South Africa
- Died: 17 April 1988 Thohoyandou, Venda
- Party: National Party of Venda
- Parent: George Mbulaheni Mphephu (father)

Patrick Ramaano Mphephu (c. 1924 – 17 April 1988) was the first president of the bantustan of Venda, which was granted nominal independence from South Africa on 13 September 1979.

Mphephu was born in Dzanani settlement and after graduating from high school worked for the Johannesburg City Council. A paramount chief of the Venda people, he was appointed Chairman of the Ramabulana Regional Authority in 1959, Chief Counsellor of the Venda Legislative Assembly on 1 June 1971 and Chief Minister of the two discontiguous territories on 1 February 1973 when South Africa first implemented the black homeland (bantustan) policy. Mphephu was re-elected in elections in August 1973 and his title changed to president upon independence. As president, he was also leader of the National Party of Venda, the only recognized political party in the new state. He and his party were supporters of a free market economy. Mphephu died in office and was replaced by his finance minister, Chief Frank Ravele.

Political offices
New title	President of Venda; 1979–1988	Succeeded by Frank Ravele
