= Malamulele =

- Location within Limpopo Location within South Africa
- Coordinates: 22°58′16″S 30°40′25″E
- Country: South Africa
- Province: Limpopo
- District: Vhembe
- Municipality: Collins Chabane
- Established: 1960

Government
  - Mayor: Moses Maluleke (assassinated in July 2022) (ANC)

Area
  - Total: 9.57 km^{2} (3.69 sq mi)
- Elevation: 167.9 m (551 ft)

Population (2011)
  - Total: 13,070
  - Density: 1,370/km^{2} (3,540/sq mi)

Racial makeup (2011)
  - Black African: 99.3%
  - Coloured: 0.2%
  - Indian/Asian: 0.1%
  - White: 0.2%
  - Other: 0.2%

First languages (2011)
  - Tsonga: 93.7%
  - Venda: 1.7%
  - English: 1.2%
  - Other: 3.5%
- Time zone: UTC+2 (SAST)
- Postal code (street): 0982
- PO box: 0982
- Area code: 015

Malamulele can refer to the town of Malamulele or the area of Malamulele. Both the town (approximately in the center of the area) and area are in the Limpopo province of South Africa and predominantly occupied by Tsonga people. Malamulele town has one provincial road and one regional road; the R81 to Giyani and the R524 to Thohoyandou (and the Kruger National Park's Punda Maria Gate) respectively. Malamulele is flanked by two rivers, Levubu River (Rivhubye) to the west and Letaba River to the east, meanwhile the Shingwedzi River runs from Malamulele West to Malamulele East, joining the Olifants in Mozambique on its way to the Indian Ocean. Malamulele is the seat of the Collins Chabane Local Municipality.

There are between 100 and 120 villages in the Malamulele area, with an approximate population of half a million. According to official Stats SA census 2011 results, some 82 Malamulele villages (excluding the township), were home to 206,646 people. In 2001, Thulamela calculated the population according to some 16 main areas (again, excluding the township), supposedly representing the number of independent chiefs, which add up to 199,807 inhabitants.

The Malamulele Area is situated between Giyani on the east, starting at Letaba river, and Thohoyandou on the north-west, starting at Rivhubye river. To the west of Malamulele Area is Waterval, famous for the Elim Hospital. The Cahora Bassa HVDC power transmission line passes through Malamulele from Tete Province to Gauteng. The Malamulele Area formed its own municipality in August 2016, named Collins Chabane, separated from Thulamela but still under the Vhembe District Municipality.

== Surrounding areas ==
To the north-east of Malamulele Town is the Kruger National Park, where it is located 63 km away from the Punda Maria gate, 72 km from the Punda Maria Rest Camp, 99 km from the Shingwedzi Rest Camp, 108 km from the Pafuri Rest Camp and 135 km from the Mopani Rest Camp.

Malamulele Town is 243 km from Polokwane (the capital of Limpopo Province), 453 km from Pretoria and 508 km from Johannesburg.

The shortest straight-line distance from Malamulele Town to the Zimbabwe border is about 60 km and also 60 km to the Mozambique border. Its proximity to Zimbabwe and Mozambique makes Malamulele one of the northernmost towns in South Africa.

== History ==
Malamulele was borne out of the homeland settlement system imposed by the Apartheid government. The people of Malamulele come from both sides of the Rivhubye and were resettled on the eastern side. Most of the people in Phaphazela village come from Malonga in what is now Vuwani. Phaphazela used to be called Malonga in remembrance of their former lands. Some people of the Makhuvele lineage were removed from parts of what is now Thohoyandou. Thus some of the people of Malamulele are the Magwamba, who used to form the Xipilongo (Spelonken) Empire. There has also been communities that were moved from the Kruger National Park to settle in Malamulele. About 40,000 people were moved from west of Rivhubye and settled in Malamulele, whereas about 10,000 were moved from Malamulele and settled in what was to become Venda.

Malamulele was the first town to be built in the former Gazankulu homeland, prior to Giyani. It was named by Chief Risimati Chanyela Mulamula. It was one of the former 7 districts of Gazankulu, namely Nkowankowa, N'wa-Mitwa, Lulekani, Mhala, Hlanganani, Giyani, and of course, Malamulele. At the end of apartheid, Malamulele was renamed to Levubu-Shingwedzi Transitional Local Municipality, after the two rivers. An amalgamation with Thohoyandou led to the Thulamela Local Municipality, which then centralised all administration and services in Thohoyandou.

The years 2000 to 2015 saw consistent objections to the merger with Thohoyandou. In the last few years, the objections went from peaceful applications to the Municipal Demarcation Board to violent protests with property being damaged. The protests were mired with accusations of tribalism and denial, claiming all South African municipalities face service delivery protests. The issue was demonstrated to be imbalanced services between Thohoyandou areas and Malamulele areas. Even with poor service delivery, Thohoyandou areas still enjoyed better service in comparison to Malamulele areas. In July 2015, the Municipal Demarcation Board announced that a new municipality would be formed to serve Malamulele. In August 2016 the new Collins Chabane Local Municipality started to operate in Malamulele, it also serves Vuwani and Bungeni which were under Makhado Local Municipality before.

== Geography and climate ==
Malamulele is a low-lying area at risk of flooding. There are a lot of hills, but no known mountains. The soil structure is mainly sandy grey soil (ntlhava), which the area is named after. Malamulele is approximately 1551.93 km^{2} in land area. It has a perimeter of 178.283 km^{2}. The area is sparsely populated with a lot of bush between neighbouring settlements. The town has a very dry subtropical climate, specifically a humid subtropical climate (Köppen climate classification: Cwa), with long, hot and rainy summers and short, cool and dry winters.

== Political atmosphere ==
Since 1994, the first time that the people of Malamulele and the rest of black South Africa were ever allowed to vote, the electorate has always voted for the ANC. A few voted for Ximoko xa Rixaka (Whip of the Nation), which has now morphed into XPP (Ximoko Progressive Party). Since then, the majority of Malamulele has voted for the ANC by default, with around 80% of the votes going to the ANC, about 20% higher than the national average.

== Demographics ==
There are between 100 and 120 villages in the Malamulele area, with an approximate population of ± 500,000. According to official Stats SA census 2011 results, some 82 Malamulele villages (excluding the township), were home to 206,646 people. During the same period, Malamulele Town had a population of 13,070. In 2001, or 10 years prior, Thulamela calculated the population according to some 16 main areas (again, excluding the township), supposedly representing the number of independent chiefs, which added up to 199,807 people. During this same period, Malamulele Town had a population of 11,299. These main areas are: Gijana (Magona), Madonsi, Makuleke, Mavambe, Mhinga, Mphambo, Mtititi, Mudavula, Mukhomi, Gumbani, Mulamula, Mulenzhe, Ntlhaveni (Bevhula), Tshikonelo, Xigalo, Xigamane, and Xikundu, thereby recognising 14 Tsonga and 2 Venda (Mulenzhe and Tshikonelo) chiefs. These places account for 1362 km^{2} of Malamulele's 1552 km^{2} total land area.

For perspective, its northwestern neighbour, Thohoyandou, had a population of 69,453 in 2011, more than double its 2001 population of 32,730. Its eastern neighbour, Giyani, rose from 22,725 to 25,954.
