= Dzanani =

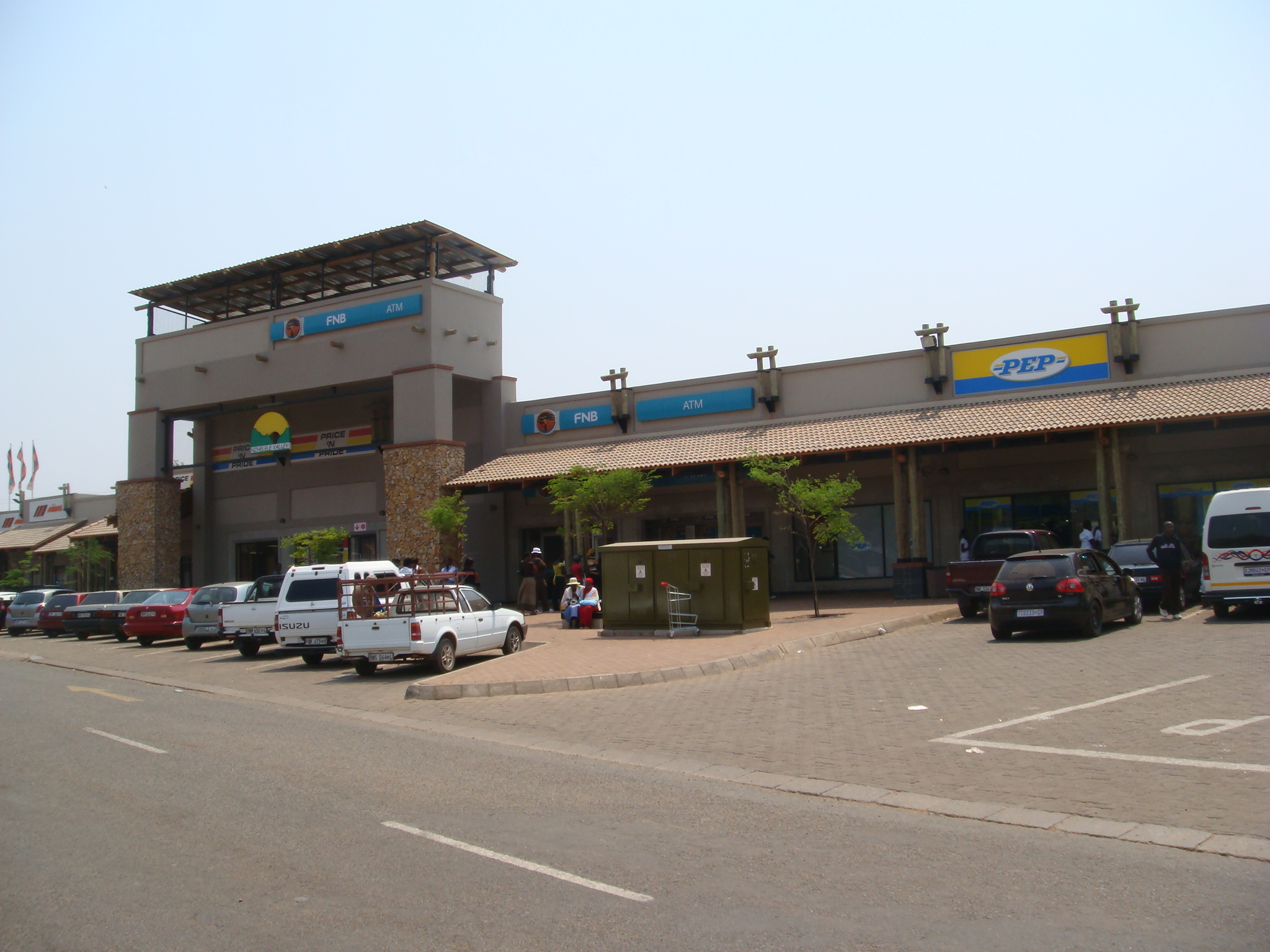
- Nzhelele Valley shopping centre in Dzanani

- Location within Limpopo Location within South Africa Location within Africa
- Coordinates: 22.878°S 30.153°E
- Country: South Africa
- Province: Limpopo
- District: Vhembe
- Municipality: Makhado

Area
  - Total: 4.50 km^{2} (1.74 sq mi)

Population (2011)
  - Total: 5,673
  - Density: 1,260/km^{2} (3,270/sq mi)

Racial makeup (2011)
  - Black African: 99.1%
  - Indian/Asian: 0.6%
  - White: 0.1%
  - Other: 0.3%

First languages (2011)
  - Venda: 92.9%
  - English: 1.4%
  - Other: 5.8%
- Time zone: UTC+2 (SAST)
- Postal code (street): 0955
- PO box: 0955
- Area code: 015

Dzanani is a town and also the name of a region in the former Venda, now part of Limpopo province in South Africa. Dzanani was named after MuDzanani, which is one of the main surnames in Venda; and also the then Paramount Chiefs (Khosi Khulu) of Songozwi. The language predominantly spoken is TshiVenda, which is one of the eleven official languages of South Africa.

Dzanani is 40 kilometres (25 mi) from the town of Thohoyandou, 50 kilometres (31 mi) from Louis Trichardt, 420 kilometres (260 mi) from Pretoria and about 690 kilometres (430 mi) from Harare in Zimbabwe. It is 150 kilometres (93 mi) from Polokwane International Airport and about 460 kilometres (290 mi) from O. R. Tambo International Airport in Johannesburg. There is a tarred road leading to Dzanani and other nearby areas. It is usually a warm place, but can get very hot in summer and cold in winter.

Dzanani used to be one of the four districts in the former Republic of Venda, along with Vuwani, Mutale and Thohoyandou. The Dzata ruins was declared a national heritage site of South Africa. The whole of Songozwi region, that includes Louis Trichardt or Tshirululuni in Venda, was Dzanani until 1949. Other places nearby include Lake Fundudzi, Songozwi sacred site, Phiphidi Waterfalls, the breathing stone, the Kruger National Park, and the Mapungubwe National Park and heritage site.

There are grocery stores and fast food outlets, and fruits are sold in the town. There are banking facilities and ATMs of all four major banking groups. Dzanani has a post office, the Mphephu Police Station, Dzanani Magistrate Court and the regional Municipality offices. There are also furniture shops, car parts shops, medical facilities, and other necessary facilities.

There are several primary schools, secondary schools and crèches. Makhado Multi Purpose College and Mavhoi Technical College offer different courses for students from the province. There is also a sports stadium and community hall.
