= Sibasa =

- Location within Limpopo Location within South Africa Location within Africa
- Coordinates: 22.932°S 30.467°E
- Country: South Africa
- Province: Limpopo
- District: Vhembe
- Municipality: Thulamela
  - Councillor: (ANC)

Area
  - Total: 3.39 km^{2} (1.31 sq mi)

Population (2001)
  - Total: 4,314
  - Density: 1,270/km^{2} (3,300/sq mi)

Racial makeup (2001)
  - Black African: 100.0%

First languages (2001)
  - Venda: 96.2%
  - Tsonga: 2.0%
  - Other: 1.8%
- Time zone: UTC+2 (SAST)
- Postal code (street): 0970
- PO box: 0970
- Area code: 015

Sibasa is a village in Limpopo Province, South Africa and the former capital city of the Venda Bantustan. When Venda was declared independent in 1979, the capital was moved to Ṱhohoyanḓou.

The town is 72 km north-north-east of Louis Trichardt. It was named after a Venda chief, Tshivhase.
