= Luvhimbi dynasty =

Venda dynasty

The Luvhimbi dynasty were a Venda ruling family in the Soutpansberg who originally belonged to the Mbedzi mutupo (totem-affiliated clans), later changing their affiliation to Singo. They claim to have migrated from Malungudze Hill in southern modern-day Zimbabwe to Soutpansberg to conquer the Dzivhani, and settled Makoleni sometime between the 15th and 16th centuries, with tradition holding their first ruler as the renowned rainmaker Luvhimbi. (Note: David Beach said that the Mbedzi dynasty at Malungudze Hill migrated there from Soutpansberg no earlier than the 18th century. He also said that "Luvhimbi" was likely to have been a title.) They were renowned rainmakers and were originally seated in Tshaluvhimbi before moving slightly south to Tshitaka-lsha-Makoleni or Makoleni (descendants of the dynasty continue to visit the two sites annually). When the Singo arrived in the late-17th century, the Luvhimbi were subjugated. The Luvhimbi ruler's sister became their leader and the Singo Tshivhase dynasty's principal rainmaker. In decreasing order of prestige, Tshivhase rulers came to be buried at mountains, Mbedzi leaders at pools, and Dzivhani leaders on dry ground (zwiomo, "dry ones"). Over time, the Luvhimbi lost their ritual prestige and abandoned Makoleni.
