= 1973 Venda legislative election =

Parliamentary elections were held in Venda on 15 and 16 August 1973. The Venda Independence People's Party won 10 of the 18 elected seats in the Legislative Assembly.

== Electoral system ==
The Legislative Assembly consisted of 60 seats, of which only 18 were elected. The remaining 42 seats were reserved for 25 Chiefs, 2 Headmen and a further 15 members appointed by Chiefs.

== Results ==
Party	Seats
Venda Independence People's Party	10
Venda National Party	5
Independents	3
Chiefs	25
Headmen	2
Appointees	15
Total	60
