= Venda Defence Force =

Defence force of the Republic of Venda

- Flag of the VDF

- Roundel of the VDF Air Wing
- Founded: 1979
- Disbanded: April 1994
- Service branches: One Venda Battalion; Two Venda Battalion; Air Wing
- Headquarters: Sibasa, Thohoyandou

Leadership
- Commander-in-Chief: Brigadier General Gabriel Ramushwana

Personnel
- Military age: 18–49

Related articles
- History: Military history of South Africa
- Ranks: Military ranks of Venda

The Venda Defence Force (VDF) was established in September 1982 from the 112 Battalion of the South African Defence Force and the military branch of the Venda National Force which itself had been formed when the Venda homeland became independent from South Africa in September 1979.

== Venda Defence Force ==
=== Origin ===
The Venda National Force was established with Venda’s independence in 1979 and included defence and other services such as police and prisons. Strange enough, traffic policing was part of this national force, but by 1981 it was transferred to the Department of Justice. The Fire Brigade was however still part of the Venda National Force although there was plans to transfer this to the civilian government.

==== Development of the VDF ====
Colonel Gabriel Ramushwana was appointed the chairman of the Council and Minister of Defence and National Intelligence was second in command as well as the Venda Security Police before being transferred to the VDF as chief of staff by State President Patrick Mphephu with the aim of his eventual succession as chief of the VDF.

==== 112 Battalion and One Venda Battalion ====
The VDF itself was formally separated from the National Force on the 27 September 1982 when the SADF’s 112 Battalion from Madimbo, part of the Soutpansberg Military Area, which was outside the Venda territory, was disbanded and re-established to form One Venda Battalion at Manenu. At that stage this battalion consisted of three companies and was to all purposes a light infantry battalion.

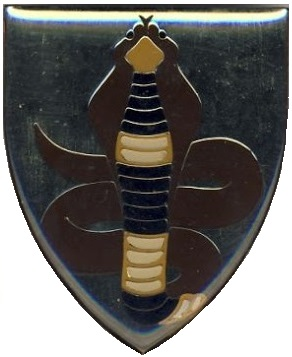
SADF 112 battalion emblem

==== Two Venda Battalion ====
Two Venda Battalion was established around 1985/86 and was initially housed in temporary quarters until 1986/1987.

==== Air Wing ====
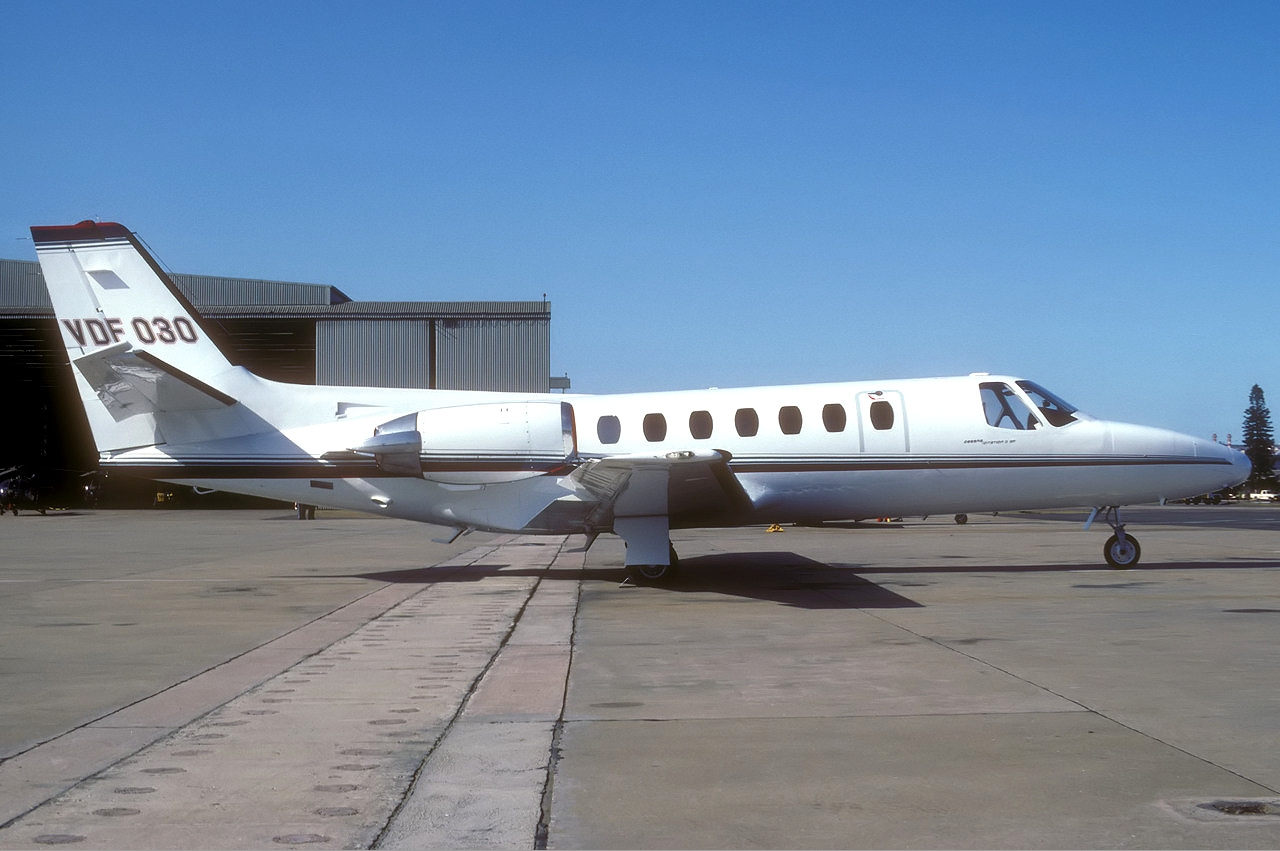
Cessna Citation II in VDF service

The VDF also consisted of a small air wing consisting of light helicopters (MBB/Kawasaki BK 117 and Aérospatiale Alouette III) and fixed wings (CASA C-212 Aviocar and Cessna Citation II).

=== Coup ===
A bloodless coup occurred on 5 April 1990, the then Colonel Ramushwana was attending a SADF Army Staff Course in Pretoria. Until that date the chief of the VDF was a seconded SADF officer, Brigadier Steenkamp, with Ramushwana as his chief of staff. State President Ravele was the commander in chief and was advised by a security council.

=== Aftermath ===
After the coup, Ramushwana became chief of the VDF as well as the chairman of the Council of National Unity. A security working committee was established to replace the Security Council. The SEWOCOM consisted of:

- Ramushwana, now a brigadier, as chairman,
- the chief of staff of the VDF, a Colonel W. Swanepoel,
- the senior staff officer intelligence, Lt. Col. Muthambi
- the senior staff officer operations, Lt. Col. Vermeulen
- the police commissioner, Colonel Phaswana
- the director general of the Venda National Intelligence,
- the advocate-general, Moosa Batlivala and
- two other members of the Council of National Unity.

This committee dealt with all security related issues in Venda including the quality of government, since the coup followed widespread allegations of corruption and maladmistration.

=== Insignia ===
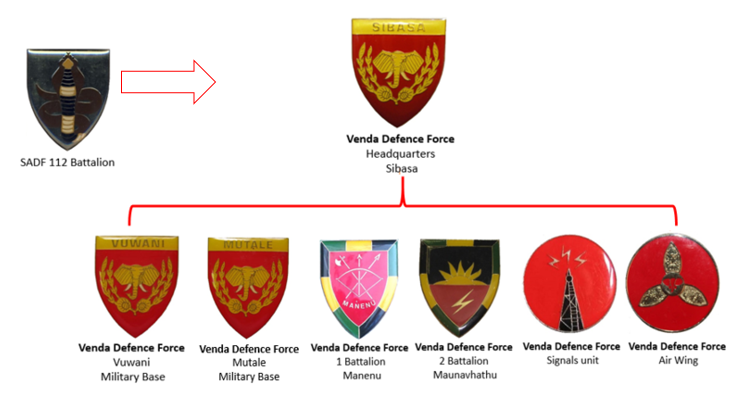
Venda Defence Force insignia

=== Ranks ===
Officer ranks

Rank group	General / flag officers	Senior officers			Junior officers
Venda Ground Forces
Venda Ground Forces	Brigadier	Colonel	Lieutenant colonel	Major	Captain	Lieutenant	Second lieutenant

Other ranks

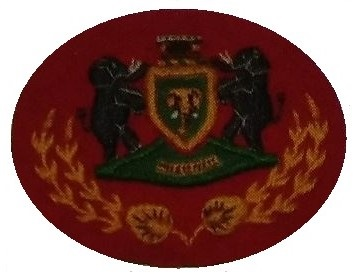
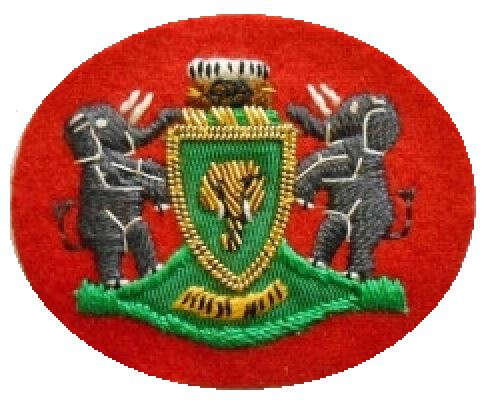
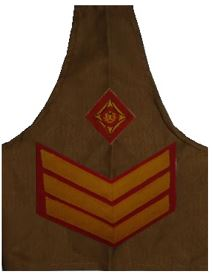
Rank group	Senior NCOs				Junior NCOs		Enlisted
Venda Ground Forces							No insignia
Venda Ground Forces	Chief warrant officer	Warrant officer	Staff sergeant	Sergeant	Corporal	Lance corporal	Private

=== Awards ===
- Gallantry Cross (Gold)
- Gallantry Cross (Silver)
- Distinguished Service Medal (Gold)
- Distinguished Service Medal (Silver)
- General Service Medal (Venda)
- Independence Medal (Venda)
- Long Service Medal (Gold)
- Long Service Medal (Silver)
- Long Service Medal (Bronze)
- Venda Defence Force Medal

=== Disbandment ===
With the end of the Apartheid era in 1994 in South Africa, the former defence forces of the Bantustans were incorporated into the newly formed South African National Defence Force.

== Equipment ==
The VDF was equipped for counter-insurgency (COIN) operations. The VDF used:

- R4/R5 assault rifles,
- 5.56 mm Light Machine Gun,
- 7.62 mm Medium Machine Gun
- 40 mm Multiple Grenade Launcher,
- 60 mm and
- 81 mm mortars
- 12.7 mm Browning Heavy Machine Gun

Vehicles included:

- Mambas,
- Buffels,
- Samil 20,
- seven ton Isuzu trucks and
- 4x4 vehicles
