= Pfano na vhuthihi =

National anthem of Venda

English: "Peace and Togetherness"
- National anthem of Venda
- Lyrics: unknown
- Music: unknown
- Adopted: 1979
- Relinquished: 27 April 1994

Audio sample
- "Pfano na vhuthihi": file; help

"Pfano na vhuthihi" ("Peace and Togetherness") was the national anthem of Venda.

== Lyrics ==
Venda original

Muṋe wa dzitshaka
Shango lashu Venda
Li ṋee Mulalo
Vhuṱali na vhuhali
Vhathu shangoni
Nga vha takale

Pfano na vhuthihi
Nga zwi vhe zwipikwa
U shuma hu pfumbiswe
Zwivhuya zwi ande
Kha masia oṱhe

Hu pfale mulalo
