= 1978 Venda parliamentary election =

Parliamentary elections were held in Venda on 5 and 6 July 1978. The Venda Independence People's Party won 31 of the 42 elected seats in the Legislative Assembly.

== Electoral system ==
The Legislative Assembly consisted of 84 seats, half of which were elected and half of which were appointed.

== Results ==
| Party | Votes | % | Seats | +/– |
|---|---|---|---|---|
| Venda Independence People's Party | | | 31 | +18 |
| Venda National Party | | | 11 | +6 |
| Appointed members | | | 42 | – |
| Total | | | 84 | +24 |
| Total votes | 123,000 | – | | |
Source: African Elections Database
