= Frank Ravele =

Venda king and president

2nd President of Venda
- In office 17 April 1988 – 5 April 1990; Acting: 17 April 1988 – 10 May 1988
- Preceded by: Patrick Mphephu
- Succeeded by: Gabriel Ramushwana (Head of State [Chairman of the Council of National Unity])

Personal details
- Born: Frank Ndwakhulu Ravele; 1926 Old Mauluma, Transvaal, Union of South Africa
- Died: 1999 (aged 72–73)
- Party: National Party of Venda

Chief Frank Ndwakhulu Ravele (1926–1999) was the second president of the bantustan of Venda, which was granted nominal independence from South Africa on 13 September 1979.

Ravele became president on 17 April 1988, after the death of Chief Patrick Mphephu, the first president of Venda; he served in acting capacity until 10 May. Previously, Ravele served in the cabinet as finance minister. When violent strikes and riots broke out in early 1990, he was overthrown on 5 April in a bloodless coup by General Gabriel Ramushwana, then chief of staff of the Venda Defence Force.

Political offices
| Preceded by Patrick Mphephu | President of Venda; 1988–1990 | Succeeded by Gabriel Ramushwana as Head of State (Chairman of the Council of National Unity) |
