= Collins Chabane Local Municipality =

Collins Chabane
- Local municipality
- Country: South Africa
- Province: Limpopo
- District: Vhembe
- Seat: Malamulele

Government
  - Type: Municipal council

Area
  - Total: 5,003 km^{2} (1,932 sq mi)

Population (2011)
  - Total: 328,636
  - Density: 65.69/km^{2} (170.1/sq mi)
- Time zone: UTC+2 (SAST)
- Municipal code: LIM345

Collins Chabane Municipality (Tsonga: Masipala wa Collins Chabane; Venda: Masipalawapo wa Collins Chabane) is a local municipality within the Vhembe District Municipality, in the Limpopo province of South Africa. It was established after the August 2016 local elections by merging portions of the Thulamela and Makhado local municipalities. Malamulele is the seat of the municipality. It is named after Collins Chabane, South African Minister of Public Service and Administration who died in a motor vehicle accident on Sunday, 15 March, 2015.

== Main places ==
Place	Population	Area (km^{2})
Basani	3,408	4.39
Bulwini	2,474	2.35
Gandlanani	3,445	3.83
Gijamhandzeni	1,153	1.55
Gumbani	2,229	2.16
Hasane	2,710	2.97
Jimmy Jones	3,371	3.17
Lulamani	61	0.11
Machele	1,192	1.03
Madonsi	3,220	3.05
Makuleke	4,502	3.31
Malamulele	13,070	9.57
Mapimele	467	0.40
Mavambe	4,133	5.28
Mavunda A	388	0.3
Mtititi	3,341	3.56
Ka-Bazela SP	1,252	1.26
Ka-Dinga	2,122	1.31
Ka-Hasane	1,927	1.74
Ka-Jilongo	3,117	2.82
Ka-Mabayeni	1,361	1.95
Ka-Mahonisi	3,748	2.57
Ka-Mapapila	1,730	1.43
Ka-Matiani	3,073	3.62
Ka-Matsakali	1,505	1.28
Nhombelani	1,207	2.13
Ka-Mchipise	3,203	4.95
Ka-Mdabula	808	0.61
Ka-Mhinga	10,524	7.28
Ka-Mphambo	3,714	3.03
Ka-Mulamula	3,068	3.06
Ka-Muswane	2,165	2.87
Ka-Nkovani Shaswita	5,438	3.95
Ka-Nghezimani	2,170	2.83
Ka-Nyavani	305	0.68
Ka-Sunduza	3,774	2.85
Nkavele	2,483	2.11
Ka-Xigamani	2,055	1.95
Ka-Xihosana	2,546	2.81
Ka-Xikundu	4,452	4.36
Ka-Xikundu B	1,412	1.04
Ka-Xitlhelani	4,629	5.15

== Politics ==
The municipal council consists of seventy-one members elected by mixed-member proportional representation. Thirty-six councillors are elected by first-past-the-post voting in thirty-six wards, while the remaining thirty-five are chosen from party lists so that the total number of party representatives is proportional to the number of votes received. In the election of 1 November 2021 the African National Congress (ANC) won a majority of fifty-five seats on the council.

The following table shows the results of the election.

Party	Ward			List			Total seats
Party	Votes	%	Seats	Votes	%	Seats	Total seats
African National Congress	55,324	73.23	35	58,524	77.79	20	55
Economic Freedom Fighters	6,677	8.84	0	7,155	9.51	7	7
Independent candidates	6,585	8.72	1				1
Able Leadership	1,867	2.47	0	1,856	2.47	2	2
Democratic Alliance	1,191	1.58	0	1,310	1.74	1	1
Know Your Neighbour	812	1.07	0	809	1.08	1	1
African People's Convention	619	0.82	0	678	0.90	1	1
African Christian Democratic Party	635	0.84	0	646	0.86	1	1
Pan Africanist Congress of Azania	46	0.06	0	1,223	1.63	1	1
Ximoko Party	445	0.59	0	564	0.75	1	1
12 other parties	1,343	1.78	0	2,470	3.28	0	0
Total	75,544	100.00	36	75,235	100.00	35	71
Valid votes	75,544	98.56		75,235	98.24		
Invalid/blank votes	1,101	1.44		1,345	1.76		
Total votes	76,645	100.00		76,580	100.00		
Registered voters/turnout	161,628	47.42		161,628	47.38		

== Business ==
With the establishment of the new municipality called Collins Chabane Local Municipality in Vhembe District, Limpopo, a new business chamber called "Collins Chabane Chamber of Business" was established and launched formally in August 2017. Collins Chabane Chamber of Business (CCCB) is a Non-profit organization formed by the coming together of the already existing business Forums in Malamulele and Hlanganani-Vuwani areas to form a formidable entity on a municipal level, while maintaining their original and distinct purposes of driving business on an area and nodal-point levels. The former two forums have now become local area forums within the Collins Chabane Chamber of Business. The Chamber of business is responsible for the authentication of local businesses and the protection of member's rights and benefits within the local empowerment drive.

A Chamber of Business is a form of an independent, non-political, subscription-based association or business network, e.g., a local organization of businesses whose goal is to further the interests of businesses. Business owners in towns and cities form these local societies to advocate on behalf of the business community. The chamber of Business is an organization of citizens who are investing their time and money in a community development program-working together to improve the economic, civic, and cultural wellbeing of the area. There are two primary functions of a chamber of Business: first, it acts as a spokesman for the business and professional community and translates the group thinking of its members into action; secondly, it renders a specific product or services type that can be most effectively be beneficial by a community organization and to its members as a whole.

The Collins Chabane Chamber of Business is divided into two local forums (Malamulele and Hlanganai-Vuwani) and seven (7) nodal points (or economic hubs). The Malamulele local area consists of five nodal points, while Hlanganani-Vuwani local area has two nodal points. The chamber has a board of Directors consisting of members from the local areas, while the local areas has an executive consisting of members from their nodal points. Local businesses are the members that elect the local forums’ executives, and the executives elect the board of directors to set policy/constitution for the chambers.

The Collins Chabane Chamber of Business is structures to have a 7-member Executive Board who are part of a 16-member Board of directors which is also part of a Council, and the Leadership as of 2017 is as follows:
