= Vuwani =

- Location within Limpopo Location within South Africa
- Coordinates: 23.043°S 30.386°E
- Country: South Africa
- Province: Limpopo
- District: Vhembe
- Municipality: Vuwani
- Established: 1955
  - Organization: (Africa)

Area
  - Total: 2.70 km^{2} (1.04 sq mi)

Population (2011)
  - Total: 2,791
  - Density: 1,030/km^{2} (2,680/sq mi)

Racial makeup (2011)
  - Black African: 98.9%
  - Indian/Asian: 0.4%
  - Other: 0.7%

First languages (2011)
  - Venda: 84.1%
  - Tsonga: 8.4%
  - Northern Sotho: 1.0%
  - Other: 6.5%
- Time zone: UTC+2 (SAST)
- Postal code (street): 0952
- PO box: 0952
- Area code: 015

Vuwani is a town in Vhembe District Municipality in the Limpopo province of South Africa.

== Demarcation dispute ==
In 2015, the Municipal Demarcation Board decided to excise Mashau and Masakona settlements from Makhado, and merge them with the Malamulele, Tshikonelo, Mulenzhe, Pietboy, and Khakhanwa areas of the Thulamela Local Municipality in order to create a new municipality.

In 2016, residents dissatisfied with legal rulings that affirmed the Municipal Demarcation Board's decision resorted to arson and vandalism of 30 schools over a four-month period, disrupting government services and schooling.

A resultant stay-away during the 2016 local election depressed voter turnout, with only 1,600 voters participating, but the ANC was nevertheless reelected.

Destruction of government property and disruption of learning continued into April, 2017 and led to the death of two persons.
