= University of Venda =

University in Thohoyandou, South-Africa

Coordinates: 22°58′32″S 30°26′40″E

- Motto: Creating Future Leaders
- Type: Public university
- Established: 1981
- Chancellor: Adv. Mojankunyane Gumbi
- Vice-Chancellor: Prof. Ndanduleni Bernard Nthambeleni
- Students: 15,248 (2023)
- Location: Thohoyandou, Limpopo, South Africa
- Nickname: Univen
- Website: Official website

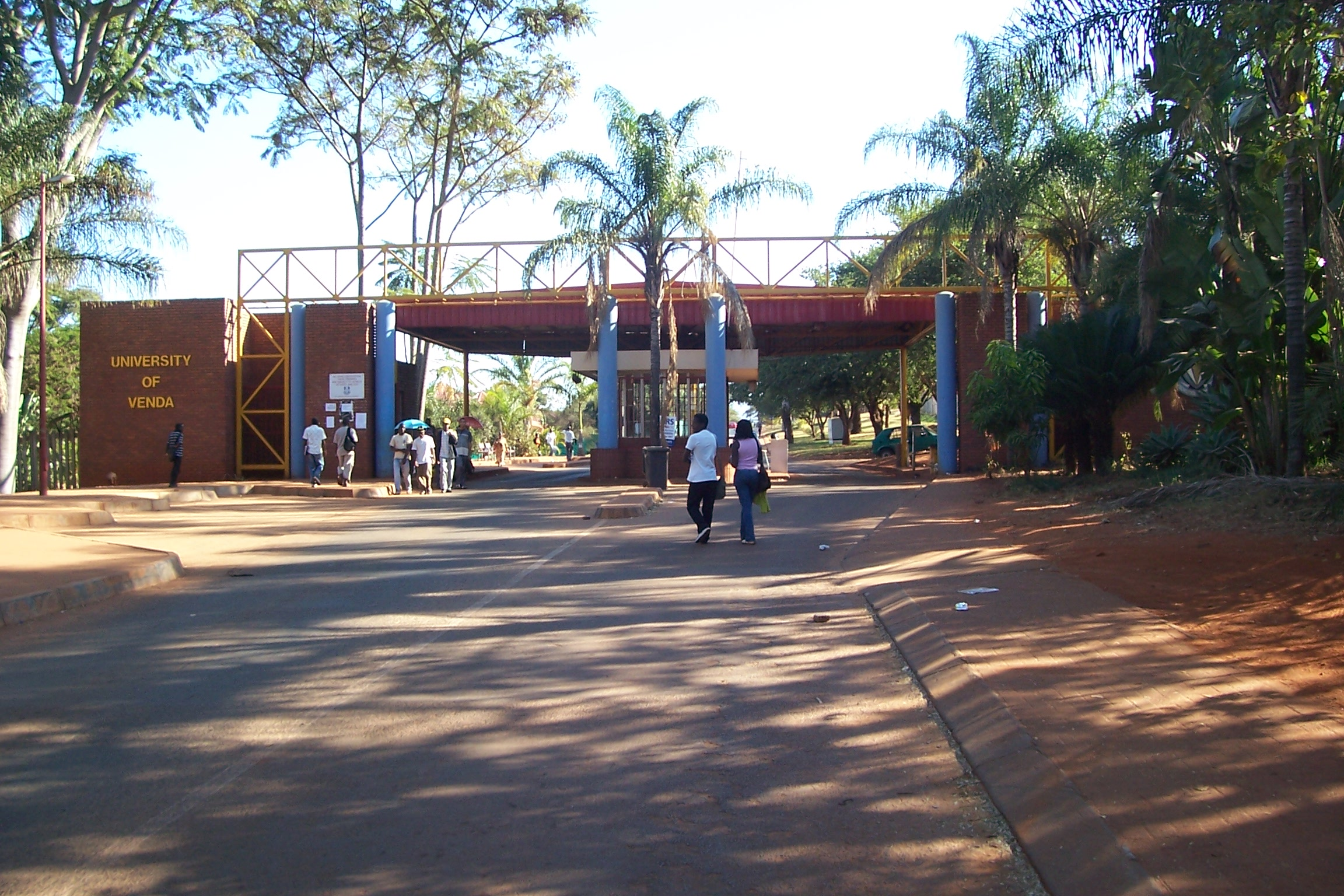
Entrance to the University of Venda

The University of Venda (Univen; Venda: Yunivesithi ya Venḓa, Afrikaans: Universiteit van Venda) is a South African comprehensive university, located in Thohoyandou in Limpopo province. It is rural-based. It was established in 1981 under the then Republic of Venda government.

== History ==
The university was established in 1981 to serve the inhabitants of the Venda Bantustan; however, the student body at Univen never consisted of Venda students only as students from all over the Northern Transvaal attended the institution. After the end of Apartheid and the re-integration of the bantustans into South Africa, Univen student body were drawn from all over South Africa. With the South African government's programme of tertiary education reform in the new millennium, Univen became a "comprehensive university", offering both theoretically oriented and practically oriented courses.

== Campus ==
The University of Venda has one main campus in Thohoyandou. The campus houses all four faculties of the institution, namely:

- The Faculty of Science, Engineering and Agriculture,
- The Faculty of Humanities, Social Sciences and Education,
- The Faculty of Health Sciences,
- The Faculty of Management, Commerce and Law.

The campus also houses the Art Gallery, which displays carvings, paintings and clay pots made by students and local community members. Furthermore, the campus has a full-time Sports Centre for indoor sports and other recreational activities such as drama and dance.

The main campus houses 13 official residences: Bernard Ncube, Carousel, F3, F4, F5, Lost City Boys, Lost City Girls, Mango Grove, Riverside, New Male Res, New Female Res, Mvelaphanda Male and Mvelaphanda Female.

== Student Representative Assembly ==
The representative student body of the University of Venda is made up of an 84-member parliament styled structure. A 14-member cabinet, the SRC executive, leads it. The assembly can be further divided into three: the first sub-division is the cabinet that is led by the president, then the deputy president, the secretary-general, and the deputy secretary-general; there are nine ministerial portfolios as follows: Ministry of Campus and Off-Campus Housing, Ministry of Education, Ministry of Finance, Bursaries and Projects, Ministry of Gender and people with Disabilities, Ministry of Health, Safety and Security, Ministry of Information, External Affairs and International Relations, Ministry of Legal, Policies, and Constitutional Affairs, Ministry of Religion, Culture, Arts and Heritage, Ministry of Sports and Recreation, and with the equivalence of a ministry there is the Chairperson of the Post Graduate Council. The second sub-division of the SRC is the Structures. These are made up of four-person executives of the Disabled Student Council (DSC), the Housing Representative Council (HRC), the Sports, Recreation and Cultural Committee (SRCC) and the School Councils from all eight schools of the university. The third sub-division is the parliament, which comprises committees under each ministerial position.

Each member of the SRC is forwarded to parliament by a student formation they belong to, except the third sub-division of the Student Representative Council, who campaign independently. The Speaker of Parliament is voted in on the first sitting of Parliament by the house. The student parliament sits four times a year, once each quarter of the year.

The Univen SRC is composed of members from different formations, the recognised student formations on campus are: AZAPO Student Convention (AZASCO), Democratic Alliance Student Organization (DASO), Economic Freedom Fighters Student Command (EFFSC), Pan-Africanist Student Movement of Azania (PASMA), South African Student Congress (SASCO), the Student Christian Organization (SCO) and the newly formed ABSC (ABANTU BATHO STUDENT CONGRESS).

Each organization contests in the general elections to deploy members to the SRC, the term of office is one year, and the period begins after annual elections in late September or early October. The ruling party for 2023-2024 is the Economic Freedom Fighters Students Command (EFFSC) univen branch. John Ndaka is the elected president.

== Media and publications ==
The University of Venda has a radio station, UNIVEN FM, which broadcasts on 99.8 MHz. The station's reach covers the Vhembe and Mopani district municipalities, as well as the area north of Kruger National Park on the eastern side. The main languages of broadcast are English, Tshivenda, Sepedi, and Xitsonga. UNIVEN FM began broadcasting in 1997, providing a valuable source of information and entertainment for the surrounding community. UNIVEN also publishes a newsletter, Nendila, which highlights the university's successes and achievements. Nendila is a valuable source of information for students, staff, and the broader community. In addition to its radio station and newsletter, the University of Venda also has a significant presence on social media. The university maintains Facebook, TikTok, Instagram, and LinkedIn accounts, where it posts news, events, and other information about the institution. These platforms allow the university to reach a wide audience and build relationships with its community.

== Funding ==
UNIVEN is a publicly funded university in South Africa, meaning that it receives financial support from the national government. While the university is funded by government, it also relies on private donations and other forms of support to continue its work. UNIVEN offers a range of financial aid and bursaries for students, including the National Student Financial Aid Scheme (NSFAS), Vice-Chancellor's Merit Bursary, and Department of Science and Innovation (DSI) and Council for Scientific and Industrial Research (CSIR) bursaries. These bursaries cover a variety of costs, including tuition fees, accommodation, textbooks, and other learning materials. These financial aid opportunities are designed to support students in accessing high-quality education at UNIVEN.

== Ranking ==
Times Higher Education Ranking 2024
Year	World Rank
2024	1201–1500
