= National Party of Venda =

Political party in Apartheid South Africa

Venda National Party Dzangano la lushaka la venda
- Leader: Patrick Mphephu (First); Frank Ravele (Last)
- Founder: Patrick Mphephu
- Founded: 1973
- Dissolved: 5 April 1990
- Ideology: Venda nationalism; Authoritarianism; Economic liberalism; Pro-apartheid; Anti-communism
- Political position: Far-right
- Regional affiliation: National Party (South Africa)

The National Party of Venda was a political party in the Bantustan Republic of Venda which was founded around 1973.

== Description ==
In 1973 it won 5 of the 18 available seats. By 1978 it had increased its seat share to 11 out of 42 seats, before winning 41 of the 45 seats in 1984.

Whilst the opposition Venda Independence People's Party (VIPP) won the majority of seats for almost every election, leader Patrick Mphephu used a variety of means to assert control, including courting the appointed chiefs that constituted a majority of the parliament in 1973, and using emergency powers to detain VIPP legislators until he was appointed prime minister in 1978, so the party effectively ran Venda as a one-party state.

Mphephu became president in 1979 after Venda's notional independence. He died in 1988 and was replaced by Frank Ravele. Ravele and the National Party of Venda were overthrown in the 1990 coup d'état by Gabriel Ramushwana.
