= Lake Fundudzi =

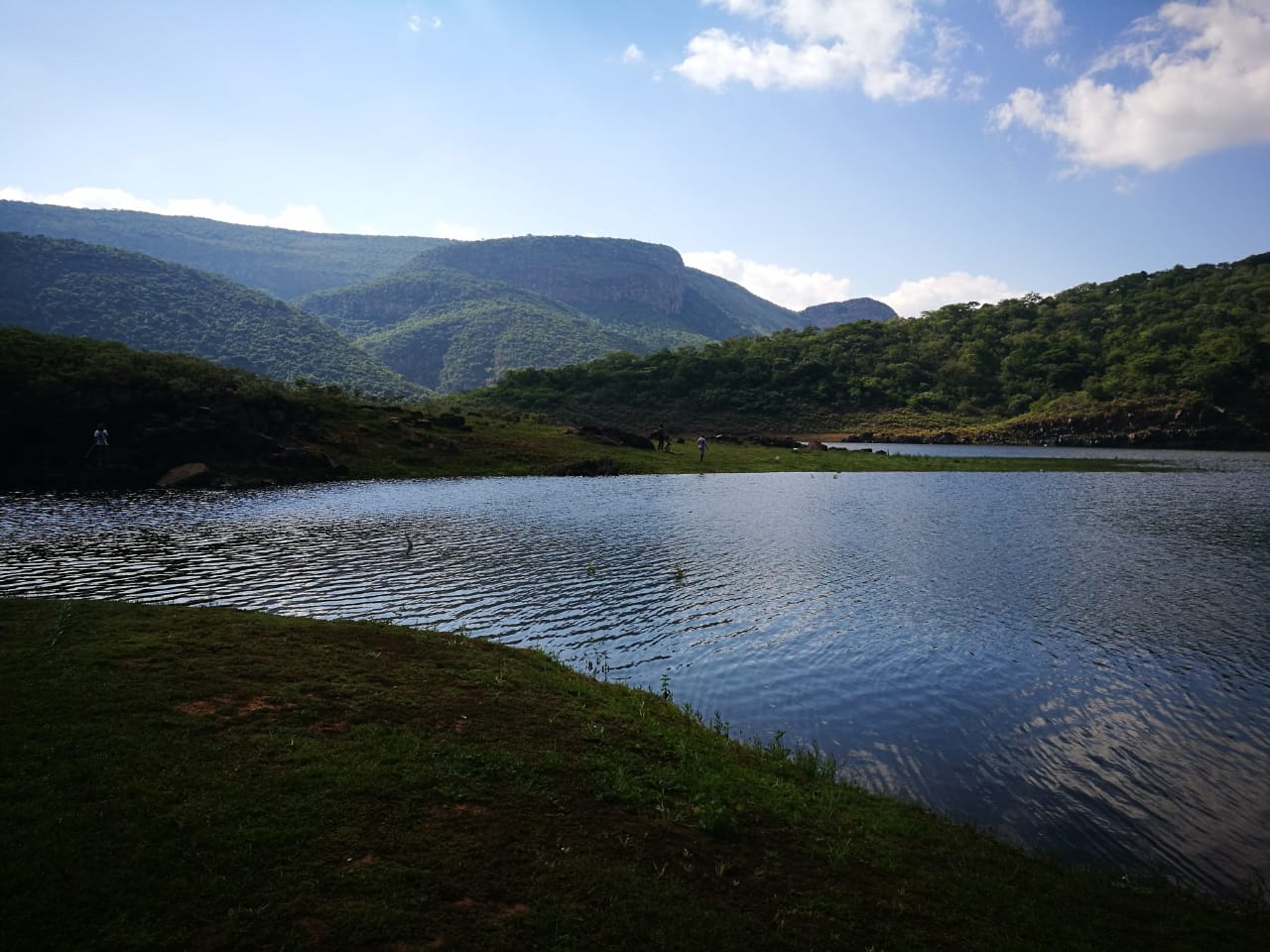

- Location within South Africa
- Location: Soutpansberg, Limpopo Province, Tshiavha village, South Africa
- Coordinates: 22°51′18″S 30°18′20″E
- Type: Barrier lake
- Primary inflows: Mutale River
- Max. depth: 27 m (89 ft)
- Surface elevation: 865 metres (2,838 ft)

Lake Fundudzi (a.k.a. Lake Funduzi) is located in the Soutpansberg in the Limpopo Province of South Africa. Measuring about 5 km by 3 km when full, it was created by an ancient landslide blocking the course of the Mutale River. The lake and its resident crocodiles as well as the nearby forest of Thathe Vondo, are regarded as sacred by the Vhatavhatsindi, the People of the Pool who are part of the Venda people. It is the only natural inland lake in Southern Africa.

== Folklore ==
According to Venda legend the lake was created when a passing leper was refused food and shelter. He cursed the kraal which disappeared below the waters of the newly formed lake and the Venda claim that in the early morning it is possible to hear the sound of drums and the cries and bellowing of the drowned people and cattle.

Legend also believes that Lake Fundudzi is protected by a python god living in the mountain. The Venda pay homage to this god by annually performing a puberty dance, characterised by the sinuous swaying and writhing of a conga line, in which adolescent girls of the tribe take part. The fullness of the lake and its colour are said to reflect the temper of the ancestors, and the possibility of rain.
