= Gabriel Ramushwana =

Venda general and president

3rd Head of State of Venda
- In office 5 April 1990 – 25 January 1994
- Preceded by: Frank Ravele
- Succeeded by: Tshamano Ramabulana

Personal details
- Born: Gabriel Ramushwana; 1 July 1941 Musina, Transvaal, Union of South Africa
- Died: 12 January 2015 (aged 73) Thaba Tshwane Military Hospital, Tshwane, Gauteng, South Africa
- Party: ANC (Military)

Gabriel Ramushwana (1 July 1941 – 12 January 2015) was a head of state of the Bantustan of Venda.

== Military career ==
He joined the SAP in Welkom as a Constable in 1960 and was seconded to the SADF 112 Infantry Battalion as a Warrant Officer in 1973. After being rushed through SADF OCS, he was commissioned as a Lieutenant and a Company 2 i/c (Note: 2nd in Command) in 112 Infantry Battalion in 1977. Promoted to captain in 1980 and made Battalion Intelligence Officer. He was made the CO of the 1 Venda Battalion in 1981, and the deputy commanding officer of the Venda Defence Force in 1984.

On 8 February 1994, he was made Major-General of the National Peacekeeping Force.

== Biography ==
On 5 April 1990, he led the overthrow of the government of President Frank Ravele and established a military government.

Ramushwana died on 12 January 2015 at the age of 73.

== Notes ==
Political offices
Preceded by Frank Ravele as President	Head of State of Venda; Chairman of the Council of National Unity; 1990 – 1994	Succeeded by Tshamano Ramabulana
