= Venda (Bantustan) =

Bantustan in South Africa (1979–1994)

Coordinates: 22.95°S 30.48°E

Republic of Venda Riphabuliki ya Venḓa (Venda) Republiek van Venda (Afrikaans)
- 1979–1994
- Flag Coat of arms
- Motto: "Shumela Venda" (Venda) "Always Aspire for Venda"
- Anthem: Pfano na vhuthihi (Venda)^{a} Peace and Togetherness
- Location of Venda (red) within South Africa (yellow).
- Status: Bantustan (de facto) puppet state of Apartheid South Africa
- Capital: Thohoyandou
- Official languages: Venda; English; Afrikaans
- President
  - 1979–1988: Patrick Mphephu
  - 1988–1990: Frank Ravele
- Head of State
  - 1990–1994: Gabriel Ramushwana
  - Jan–Apr 1994: Tshamano Ramabulana
- Legislature: Legislative Assembly
- History
  - Self-government: 1 February 1973
  - Nominal independence: 13 September 1979
  - Coup d'etat: 5 April 1990
  - Dissolution: 27 April 1994

Area
- 1980: 7,410 km^{2} (2,860 sq mi)

Population
  - 1980: 315,545
  - 1991: 558,797
- Currency: South African rand
Preceded by	Succeeded by
Republic of South Africa (1961–1984)	South Africa
- 1. Anthem of Venda at nationalanthems.info.

Venda (/ˈvɛndə/ VEN-də), officially the Republic of Venda (Venda: Riphabuliki ya Venḓa; Afrikaans: Republiek van Venda), was a Bantustan in northern South Africa. It was fairly close to the South African border with Zimbabwe to the north, while, to the south and east, it shared a long border with another black homeland, Gazankulu. It is now part of the Limpopo province. Venda was founded by the South African government as a homeland for the Venda people, speakers of the Venda language. The United Nations and international community refused to recognise Venda (or any other Bantustan) as an independent state.

== History ==
Venda was declared self-governing on 1 February 1973, with elections held later in the year. Further elections were held in July 1978. The territory was declared independent by the South African government on 13 September 1979, and its residents lost their South African citizenship. In common with the other Bantustans, its independence was not recognised by the international community.

Venda was initially a series of non-contiguous territories in the Transvaal, with one main part and one main exclave. Its capital, formerly at Sibasa, was moved to Thohoyandou (which included the old Sibasa administrative district) when Venda was declared independent in 1979. Prior to independence, it was expanded to form one contiguous territory, with a total land area of 6,807 km^{2} (2628 sq. mi.). In the 1984 elections, the ruling Venda National Party retained its position as ruling party, beating the perpetual opposition Venda Independent People's Party (VIPP).

At independence in 1979, the population of Venda stood at about 200,000 people. The state was cut off from neighbouring Zimbabwe by the Madimbo corridor, patrolled by South African troops, to the north, and from nearby Mozambique by the Kruger National Park.

The first President of Venda, Patrick Mphephu, was also a Paramount Chief of the Vhavenda people; he was born and lived in Dzanani in Limpopo. His successor, Frank Ravele, was overthrown in a military coup by the Venda Defence Force in 1990. Afterwards, the territory was ruled by the Council of National Unity, a military junta chaired by General Gabriel Ramushwana. Venda was re-incorporated into South Africa on 27 April 1994.

== Institutions of education ==
In 1982, the University of Venda, known as Univen, was established as an institution of higher learning for the Vhavenda people.

== Districts in 1991 ==
Map of Venda showing districts and border changes

Districts of the province and population at the 1991 census.

- Dzanani: 123,035
- Mutale: 244,532
- Thohoyandou: 136,089
- Vuwani: 55,141

== Security forces ==
Flag of the Venda Defence Force

The Venda National Force was established with Venda's independence in 1979 and included defence and other services such as police and prisons. Strangely enough, traffic policing was part of this national force, but, by 1981, it was transferred to the Department of Justice. The Fire Brigade was, however, still part of the Venda National Force, although there were plans to transfer this to the civilian government.

== See also ==
- Heads of State of Venda
- Venda people (Vhavenda), the ethnic group who live mostly in the Limpopo province in South Africa.
- Venda Defence Force

== Sources ==
- Lahiff, E. (2000) An Apartheid Oasis?: Agriculture and Rural Livelihoods in Venda, Routledge. ISBN 0-7146-5137-0.
