= Thulamela Local Municipality =

Thulamela
- Local municipality
- Seal

- Location in Limpopo
- Coordinates: 22°57′S 30°29′E
- Country: South Africa
- Province: Limpopo
- District: Vhembe
- Seat: Thohoyandou
- Wards: 40

Government
  - Type: Municipal council
  - Mayor: T.N. Makumbane

Area
  - Total: 5,835 km^{2} (2,253 sq mi)

Population (2011)
  - Total: 618,462
  - Density: 106.0/km^{2} (274.5/sq mi)

Racial makeup (2011)
  - Black African: 99.3%
  - Coloured: 0.1%
  - Indian/Asian: 0.5%
  - White: 0.1%

First languages (2011)
  - Venda: 63.6%
  - Tsonga: 32.9%
  - Other: 3.5%
- Time zone: UTC+2 (SAST)
- Municipal code: LIM343

Thulamela Municipality (Venda: Masipalawapo wa Thulamela; Tsonga: Masipala wa Thulamela) is a local municipality within the Vhembe District Municipality, in the Limpopo province of South Africa. Its municipal boundaries were greatly altered after the 2016 municipal elections when much of the area that formerly belonged to the municipality, including the town of Malamulele, was incorporated into the newly formed Collins Chabane Local Municipality. It is named after the Thulamela ruins located near the Pafuri Gate of the Kruger National Park.

== Main places ==
The 2011 census divided the municipality into the following main places:

Place	Code	Population	Area (km^{2})
Begwa	966015	2,066	3.32
Budeli	966163	2,362	9.24
Buluni	966042	382	1.08
Damani	966052	1,336	3.83
Dididi	966180	2,312	2.94
Dimani	966044	807	1.92
Dlamini	966123	146	0.50
Dopeni	966102	6,560	15.15
Doveni	966176	318	1.28
Dumasi	966149	2,154	2.60
Duthuni	966166	6,345	6.70
Dzindi	966192	2,787	2.03
Dzingahe	966121	2,862	2.14
Dzivhadolo	966039	1,566	2.73
Dzwaboni	966021	597	1.87
Dzwerani	966205	5,964	14.12
Fondwe	966105	1,798	4.18
Gaba	966018	6,340	10.44
Gonani	966048	372	1.48
Gondeni A	966135	5,391	4.96
Gondeni B	966114	1,471	3.10
Ha-Lambani	966007	3,450	18.68
Ha-Matsika	966081	1,120	1.68
Ha-Radali	966079	2,052	2.79
Hatshisele	966151	4,382	3.20
Itsani	966170	11,473	6.89
Khakhanwa	966188	1,355	1.62
Khakhu	966066	142	0.88
Khalavha	966106	3,237	5.97
Khambela	966095	65	0.52
Khubvi	966051	10,271	11.50
Kruger National Park	966155	55	2935.88
Lambani	966012	1,881	3.92
Lamvi	966001	1,530	9.83
Lufule	966142	1,617	1.38
Lukalo	966016	1,532	2.75
Lutomboni	966085	529	0.75
Luvhimbi	966035	2,296	8.50
Lwamondo	966171	20,218	20.72
Mabokoro	966217	545	0.41
Madzimu	966045	5,213	3.80
Mahunguhwi	966025	394	2.54
Makahlule	966113	1,865	1.73
Makhumbe	966006	56	1.17
Makhuvha A	966148	1,050	2.29
Makhuvha B	966073	5,394	5.05
Makonde	966034	6,077	12.59
Makovha	966195	2,083	2.36
Makumbane	966167	2,219	2.33
Makwarani	966068	867	5.36
Malamangwa	966115	495	2.86
Malamhala	966204	1,211	1.00
Malavuwe	966087	2,362	2.78
Manamane	966193	2,897	3.71
Maname	966063	204	0.93
Mandala	966104	3,078	3.51
Manele	966186	1,658	1.60
Mangondi A	966147	2,373	5.33
Mangondi B	966088	1,275	1.88
Manyuwa	966156	135	1.29
Manzemba	966043	608	1.26
Mapate	966177	3,608	3.57
Maranzhe	966125	1,764	3.61
Maraxwe	966031	943	1.03
Mashawana	966202	551	1.21
Masiwane	966041	1,257	1.98
Matangari	966028	4,062	7.63
Maungani	966130	7,271	7.487
Mavhuwa	966027	55	1.12
Mavunde	966005	1,573	3.84
Mbahe	966111	982	2.99
Mbahela	966032	852	0.81
Mbilwi	966133	5,077	3.73
Mianzwi	966030	1,928	2.39
Milaboni	966098	343	0.81
Mphego	966153	3,003	2.36
Mubvumoni	966014	2,086	5.15
Mudunungu	966099	1,366	1.35
Mudzidzidzi	966060	400	1.08
Muhotoni	966033	672	0.73
Muhuyu	966046	698	1.25
Mukhomi	966207	3,810	3.24
Mukomasiandu	966117	764	1.28
Mukondeni	966003	61	1.09
Mukula	966071	8,209	10.41
Mukumbani	966080	2,431	3.04
Mulenzhe	966164	2,566	9.03
Munangwe	966036	365	0.46
Muraga	966124	1,472	2.29
Mushiru	966017	647	1.21
Mutoti	966162	904	1.85
Mutshenzheni	966011	1,062	3.61
Mutshetshe	966020	673	1.05
Mvelaphanda	966206	1,563	1.11
Nghomunghom	966157	1,799	1.20
Ngovhela	966129	6,296	7.82
Ngudza	966120	2,855	3.74
Ngwenani	966077	6,254	7.15
Phiphidi	966128	9,795	9.99
Phugeni	966152	1,512	1.35
Sambandou	966008	826	2.03
Saselamani	966069	3,727	1.84
Shanzha	966103	631	3.05
Shayandima	966169	10,259	6.15
Siambe	966138	2,565	3.29
Sindande	966070	70	1.38
Sterkstroom	966118	39	0.05
Tambaulate	966198	269	0.85
Thathe Vondo	966090	94	0.65
Thembaluvhilo	966057	43	0.09
Thenzheni	966047	1,845	2.62
Thohoyandou	966131	69,453	42.62
Thononda	966082	1,944	2.43
Thulamela NU	966050	1,399	2140.39
Tshabvuma	966002	2,168	1.93
Tshamutavha	966108	184	0.81
Tshamutilikwa	966110	814	1.06
Tshaulu	966019	2,077	2.49
Tshiavha	966053	126	0.09
Tshidimbini	966072	2,501	2.47
Tshidzate	966172	781	0.81
Tshidzini	966054	3,852	7.22
Tshidzivhe	966067	845	2.19
Tshififi	966137	2,468	4.15
Tshifudi	966038	2,343	3.47
Tshihalwe	966022	568	0.78
Tshiheni	966096	1,435	4.97
Tshiiwani	966061	227	1.10
Tshikambe	966055	471	1.16
Tshikhudini	966150	1,464	1.29
Tshikombani	966100	4,084	4.29
Tshikonelo	966091	4,809	7.20
Tshikovha	966178	2,074	1.75
Tshikunda	966127	2,177	2.93
Tshikweta	966141	814	0.54
Tshilapfene	966078	1,495	2.01
Tshilungoma	966154	2,526	3.13
Tshilungwi	966065	663	1.40
Tshiombo	966029	1,415	1.58
Tshipako	966064	800	2.17
Tshirenzheni	966101	1,248	2.08
Tshisahulu	966168	7,342	5.97
Tshisinise	966112	81	0.17
Tshitanini	966122	227	1.02
Tshitavha	966010	2,123	3.51
Tshitereke	966075	5,788	7.40
Tshithuthuni	966084	2,031	2.84
Tshivhilidulu	966107	1,339	2.35
Tshivhilwi	966056	4,334	5.00
Tshivhulani	966132	2,675	2.13
Tswera	966023	1,001	2.23
Tswinga	966179	3,948	6.41
Vhudimbilu	966116	658	1.64
Vhufuli	966076	3,626	4.23
Vhurivhuri	966004	2,215	7.49
Vhutalu	966059	430	0.93
Vondo	966126	766	1.98
Vondwe	966074	6,521	5.95
Xaswita	966145	680	0.84

== Politics ==
The municipal council consists of eighty-one members elected by mixed-member proportional representation. Forty-one councillors are elected by first-past-the-post voting in forty-one wards, while the remaining forty are chosen from party lists so that the total number of party representatives is proportional to the number of votes received. In the election of 1 November 2021 the African National Congress (ANC) won a majority of 71 seats on the council.

The following table shows the results of the election.

Party	Ward			List			Total seats
Party	Votes	%	Seats	Votes	%	Seats	Total seats
African National Congress	76,901	83.06	41	80,448	87.31	30	71
Economic Freedom Fighters	4,115	4.44	0	4,578	4.97	4	4
Independent candidates	5,301	5.73	0				0
Democratic Alliance	2,338	2.53	0	2,386	2.59	2	2
International Revelation Congress	1,299	1.40	0	1,514	1.64	1	1
Pan Africanist Congress of Azania	835	0.90	0	1,288	1.40	1	1
African Christian Democratic Party	862	0.93	0	885	0.96	1	1
African People's Convention	437	0.47	0	216	0.23	1	1
8 other parties	500	0.54	0	824	0.89	0	0
Total	92,588	100.00	41	92,139	100.00	40	81
Valid votes	92,588	99.11		92,139	98.37		
Invalid/blank votes	828	0.89		1,529	1.63		
Total votes	93,416	100.00		93,668	100.00		
Registered voters/turnout	229,018	40.79		229,018	40.90		

== Mismanagement ==
The Makhuvha Sports Complex was opened in 2012 at a cost of R22 million. It consists of soccer grounds, a stadium and two swimming pools. However, the two swimming pools were never used, and as of November 2025, the pitch is overgrown.
