= Thohoyandou =

- Town
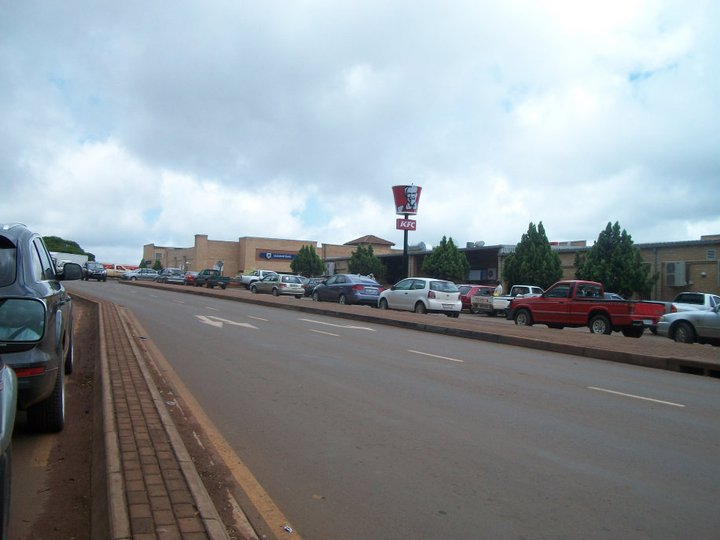
- Thohoyandou Plaza

- Location within Limpopo Location within South Africa Location within Africa
- Coordinates: 22°57′S 30°29′E
- Country: South Africa
- Province: Limpopo
- District: Vhembe
- Municipality: Thulamela
- Established: 1977 by the Vhavenda King
  - Councillor: (ANC)

Area
  - Total: 42.62 km^{2} (16.46 sq mi)

Population (2011)
  - Total: 69,453
  - Density: 1,630/km^{2} (4,221/sq mi)

Racial makeup (2011)
  - Black African: 95.5%
  - Coloured: 0.2%
  - Indian/Asian: 4.2%
  - White: 0.2%
  - Other: 0.1%

First languages (2011)
  - Venda: 84.7%
  - Tsonga: 2.6%
  - English: 2.1%
  - Northern Sotho: 1.2%
  - Other: 9.4%
- Time zone: UTC+2 (SAST)
- Postal code (street): 0950
- PO box: 0950
- Area code: 015

Thohoyandou (Venda: Ṱhohoyanḓou) is a town in the Limpopo Province of South Africa. It is the administrative centre of Vhembe District Municipality and Thulamela Local Municipality. It is also known for being the former capital of the bantustan of Venda.

== History ==
Thohoyandou became the capital of the former bantustan of Venda, while Dzanani is the traditional capital of Venda and the home of the VhaVenda kings. Thohoyandou name means "head of the elephant" in the Venda language, and was the name of one of the VhaVenda kings.

Thohoyandou was built at Tshiluvhi which was under Khosi vho Netshiluvhi. Construction started in 1977 with P East and P West residential area/location as R293 town, a shopping centre and Venda Government buildings. The Netshiluvhis were the first occupants of the area as far back as 1400 AD, i.e. after the collapse of Mapungubwe Kingdom. They were forcefully removed from this area between 1960 and 1970 by the apartheid government of the Venda Bantustan under khosi vho Mphephu Ramabulana. The name Tshiluvhi comes from the Venda word "luvha" which means to pay damages or respect. The former Venda president built his palace and his ministerial resident at Tshiluvhis chiefs kraal as they were already moved by the apartheid government. The following leaders and their subject under Netshiluvhi were forcefully removed from their areas. Some of the Netshiluvhi are known by different names: Malima, Khorommbi, Mathomu, Magidi, and Mudau. The name Tshiluvhi was totally stricken out and replaced by Thohoyandou as per the then government, and was left as a name of a primary school.

Thohoyandou was established and built at a large portion of the village of Tshiluvhi in the late 1970s. It was established by president Patrick Ramaano Mphephu who was the Prime Minister of the Venda Bantustan. Thohoyandou became the capital of Venda when Venda was declared a republic in 1979, and Thovhele ´Mphephu became the President of the Republic of Venda. Thohoyandou became the centre and economic hub of the Republic of Venda.

A stadium was built in Thohoyandou to celebrate the independence of Venda, and was known as the Venda Independence Stadium. The name was changed to Thohoyandou Stadium in 1994.

Today, Thohoyandou is one of the fastest-growing towns in Limpopo. It is also home to the University of Venda.

Thohoyandou is situated in the south of Vhembe district, north-west of Malamulele on the R524 main road between Louis Trichardt and the Kruger National Park. This is the lush agricultural centre of Vhembe, with banana plantations, subtropical fruit, tobacco and maize lands. Thohoyandou is surrounded by small rural townships such as Maungani, Ngovhela, Vonḓwe, Phiphiḓi, Muleḓane, Duthuni, Tshisaulu, Maungani, Shayandima, Makwarela, and Maniini.

== Economy ==
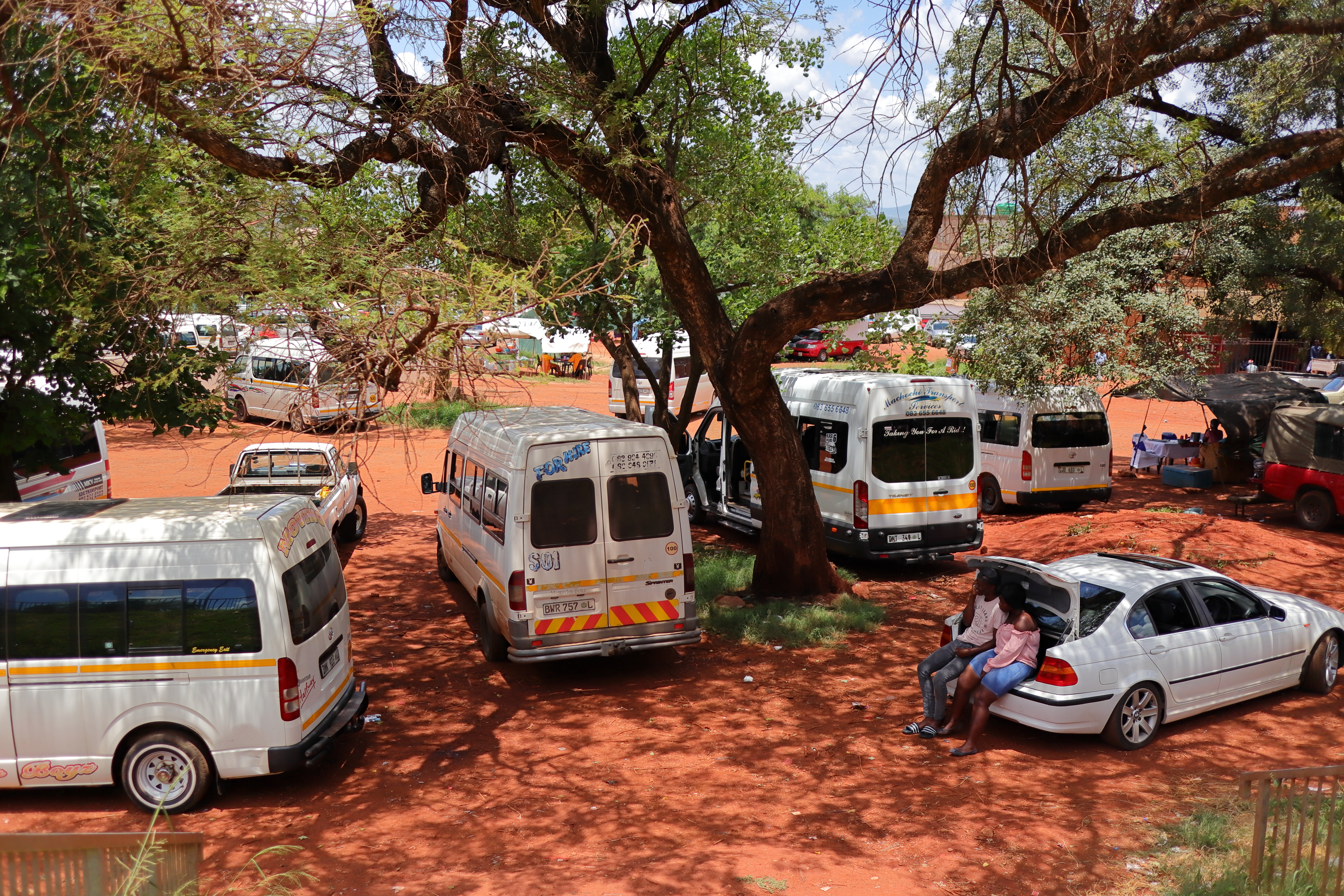
Hot midday break for Thohoyandou's taxis.

Thohoyandou is the main development node in Thulamela Local Municipality with a total of approximately 70,000 residents within the boundaries of the town. It is further surrounded by numerous rural settlements situated on the outskirts of the built-up area.

Thohoyandou's CBD was originally designed as a super mall with large walkways and water fountains, flowers and green areas. The parking lot was situated on the outskirts and people would walk to the shops. Shortage of vacant land within the CBD has slowed its growth and kept it from expanding further. The CBD has also suffered from a lack of maintenance over the past fifteen years. Thavani Mall, a new regional shopping mall opened near the CBD in 2017.

Other towns which are nearby Thohoyandou are Sibasa, 8 km; Dzanani, 45 km; Malamulele, 45 km; Makhado, 85 km; Musina, 139 km; and Polokwane, 188 km. Surrounding locations and villages include, Maniini, Muledane, Shayandima, Tswinga, Itsani, Manamani, Maungani, Tshisahulu and Duthuni.

== University of Venda ==
The University of Venda is a South African Comprehensive rural based university, located in Thohoyandou in Limpopo province. It was established in 1982 under the then Republic of Venda government.

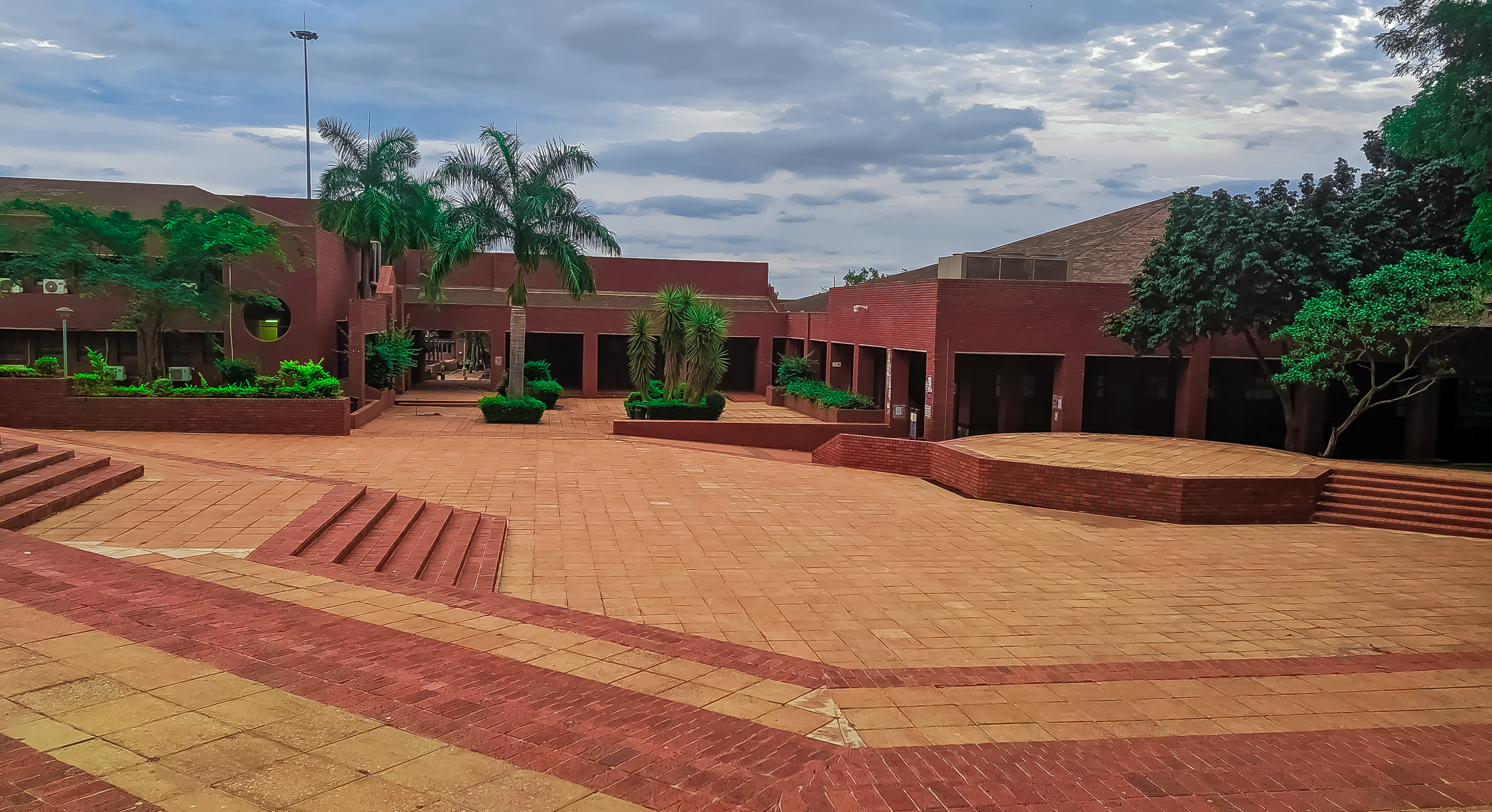
University Of Venda Freedom Square

The University of Venda has one main Campus in Thohoyandou. The campus houses all seven faculties of the institution namely The School of Agriculture, School of Education, School of Environmental Science, School of Health Sciences, School of Human and Social Sciences, School of Management Sciences, School of Mathematical and Natural Sciences and The Univen School of Law.

The campus also houses the Art Gallery, which has a display of carvings, paintings and clay pots made by both students and local community members. Furthermore, the campus has a full-time Sports Center that is used for indoor sports as well as other recreational activities such as drama and dance. The main campus houses nine of the thirteen official residences, namely Bernard Ncube, Carousel, F3, F4, F5, Lost City Boys, Lost City Girls, Mango Groove, Riverside, Mvelaphanda(female), Mvelaphanda (Male), New res female, New res Male, DBSA male and DBSA female

== Colleges ==
- Thasululo FET College
- Vhembe TVET College

== Primary and Secondary Schools ==
- Maranzhe Primary School (Murangoni Primary School)
- Manzere Primary School
- Luphai Secondary School
- Azwifarwi Secondary School
- Muthamaro Secondary School
- Tshiluvhi Primary School
- Maungani Primary School
- Buster Senior Primary School
- Herman Technical High School
- Liivha Combined School
- Marude Secondary School
- Thohoyandou Secondary School
- Thohoyandou Technical High School
- Tshikevha Christian School
- Tshishonga Primary School
- Magidi Primary School
- Gindikindi Primary School
- Makwarela Primary School
- Miluwani Primary School
- Mbaleni Primary School
- Mmbara Primary School
- Maṋiini Primary School
- Mphaphuli Secondary School
- Tshilungoma Primary School
- Muratho Primary School
- Mvudi Primary School
- Mahwasane Primary School
- Thivhilaeli Secondary School
- Tshikonelo Primary School
- Khwevha Commercial School
- Tshivhulani Primary School
- Nthetsheleseni Secondary School
- Madadzhe Secondary School
- Fulufhelo Special School
- Manzere primary school
- Tshivhuyuni primary school
- Shayandima Secondary School
- Tshivhase Secondary School
- Makumbane Primary School
- Khwevha Commercial High school
- Dimani Agricultural High school
- Thambatshira Secondary School
- Thengwe High School
- Shayandima School Of Tomorrow
- phiriphiri Secondary School
- Mbilwi Secondary School
- Muhuyu Primary School
- Lucas Ratshalingwa Secondary School
- Lukunde Primary School
