= Tswa language =

Bantu language spoken in southern Mozambique

Tswa
- Xitswa
- Native to: Mozambique
- Native speakers: 1.2 million (2006)
- Language family: Niger–Congo?: Atlantic–Congo; Volta-Congo; Benue–Congo; Bantoid; Southern Bantoid; Bantu; Southern Bantu; Tswa–Ronga; Tswa

Language codes
- ISO 639-3: tsc
- Glottolog: tswa1255
- Guthrie code: S.51,511
- Linguasphere: 99-AUT-da (shi-Tswa) incl. varieties 99-AUT-daa...-dae + 99-AUT-db (shi-Hlengwe) incl. varieties 99-AUT-dba...-dbb

Tswa (Xitswa) is a South-Eastern Bantu language in Southern Mozambique. Its closest relatives are Ronga and Tsonga, the three forming the Tswa–Ronga family of languages.

Tswa is mainly spoken in the rural areas west of Inhambane. Its largest dialect, Hlengwe, extends westwards to Southern Zimbabwe; Maho (2009) considers this to be a distinct language. The other principal dialects are Dzibi (Dzivi) and Dzonga. According to some estimates, there are perhaps more than one million BaTswa, however not all can communicate in Tswa. Many Mozambicans, including census takers, regard it as a dialect of Tsonga.

== Alphabet ==
Tswa uses a variant of the Latin alphabet previously used for Tsonga. It is partly based on those developed by the Portuguese colonists and Methodist missionaries to the region. The first major transliterator for the Tswa language into English was the Swede J. A. Persson, who consolidated the alphabet for Tswa specifically.

Letter:	A	B	C	D	E	G	H	I	J	K	L	M	N	Ṅ	O	P	R	S	Ŝ	T	U	V	W	X	Y	Z	Ẑ
Value:	a	b~β	tʃ	d	e~ɛ	ɡ	h	i	dʒ	k	l	m	n	ŋ	ɔ~o	p	r	s	ʂ	t	u	v	w	ʃ	j	z	ʐ

Ŝ and Ẑ are lightly whistled. The letter Q is sometimes used in words imported from Zulu, in which case it is pronounced in various ways, the clicks of Zulu not being native to the Tswa language. There are also several compounds, which include lateral fricatives.

Like most Bantu languages, all syllables end in vowels or nasals. Tone is important but is rarely written.

== Phonology ==
=== Consonants ===
		Labial	Labio- dental	Alveolar			Post-alv./ Palatal	Velar	Glottal
		Labial	Labio- dental	plain	whstld.	lateral	Post-alv./ Palatal	Velar	Glottal
Click	voiceless						ᵏǃ		
Click	voiced						ᶢǃ		
Click	prenasal						ᵑǃᵏ		
Nasal		m		n			ɲ	ŋ	
Plosive	voiceless	p		t			c	k	
Plosive	aspirated	pʰ		tʰ			cʰ	kʰ	
Plosive	voiced	b		d			ɟ	ɡ	
Plosive	implosive	ɓ		ɗ					
Affricate	voiceless	p͡s	p͡f	t͡s					
Affricate	voiced	b͡z	b͡v	d͡z					
Fricative	voiceless		f	s	sᶲ	ɬ	ʃ		h
Fricative	voiced		v	z	zᵝ	ɮ	ʒ		
Rhotic				r					
Approximant	lateral					l	ʎ		
Approximant	central		ʋ				j	w	

=== Vowels ===
	Front	Central	Back
Close	i		u
Mid	e		o
Open		a	

== Basics of grammar ==
Tswa is a Bantu language and thus has a noun class system and verbal system easily recognisable to Bantu speakers throughout Eastern and Southern Africa. In general the system is the same as in most Bantu languages. The following details are more specific.

=== Noun class system ===
Instead of genders there are eight classes which have a similar but more complex role, where each noun begins with a class prefix as below:

Class Number	Singular	Plural	Uses
1	ma-	ba-	mainly nouns for people
2	mu-	mi-	impersonal objects
3	gi-	ma-	impersonal objects, particularly fruit
4	xi-	ẑi-	tools, means, languages, diminutives, defects, verbal nouns
5	yi-	ti-	particularly nouns for animals
6	li-	ti-	mental qualities, states of mind, verbal nouns
7	wu-	-	abstract nouns
8	ku	-	infinitives

=== Verbal systems ===
Tswa verbs change according to status (affirmative/negative), mood (indicative/potential), aspect, tense, number, person and class. The usual three persons used in the Bantu group apply, and the first and second persons plural are maximally inclusive. The class link is usually written as a separate word, as in Tsonga and Ronga. Otherwise the paradigm is organised as follows:

Affirmative
Indicative:

Present
Present continuous
Past
Past continuous
Perfect
Pluperfect
Future
Future perfect

Potential:

Present
Past
Perfect

Negative
Indicative:

Present
Past
Past continuous
Perfect
Pluperfect
Future
Future Perfect

Potential:

Present
Past
Perfect

=== Grammatical Peculiarities of Linguistic Interest ===
Though Tswa does have a subjunctive, it does not change the standard '-a' at the end of a verb to an '-e' like most of the surrounding Bantu languages, unless it is used as an implied imperative in a dependent clause – a peculiarity it shares with the Tsonga and Ronga. The 'xi-' class, unlike its seeming equivalents in other languages, more closely mirrors the Nguni 'isi-' in that it has a strongly diminutive use.
