= Henri-Alexandre Junod =

Swiss theologian, ethnographer, anthropologist and naturalist (1863–1934)

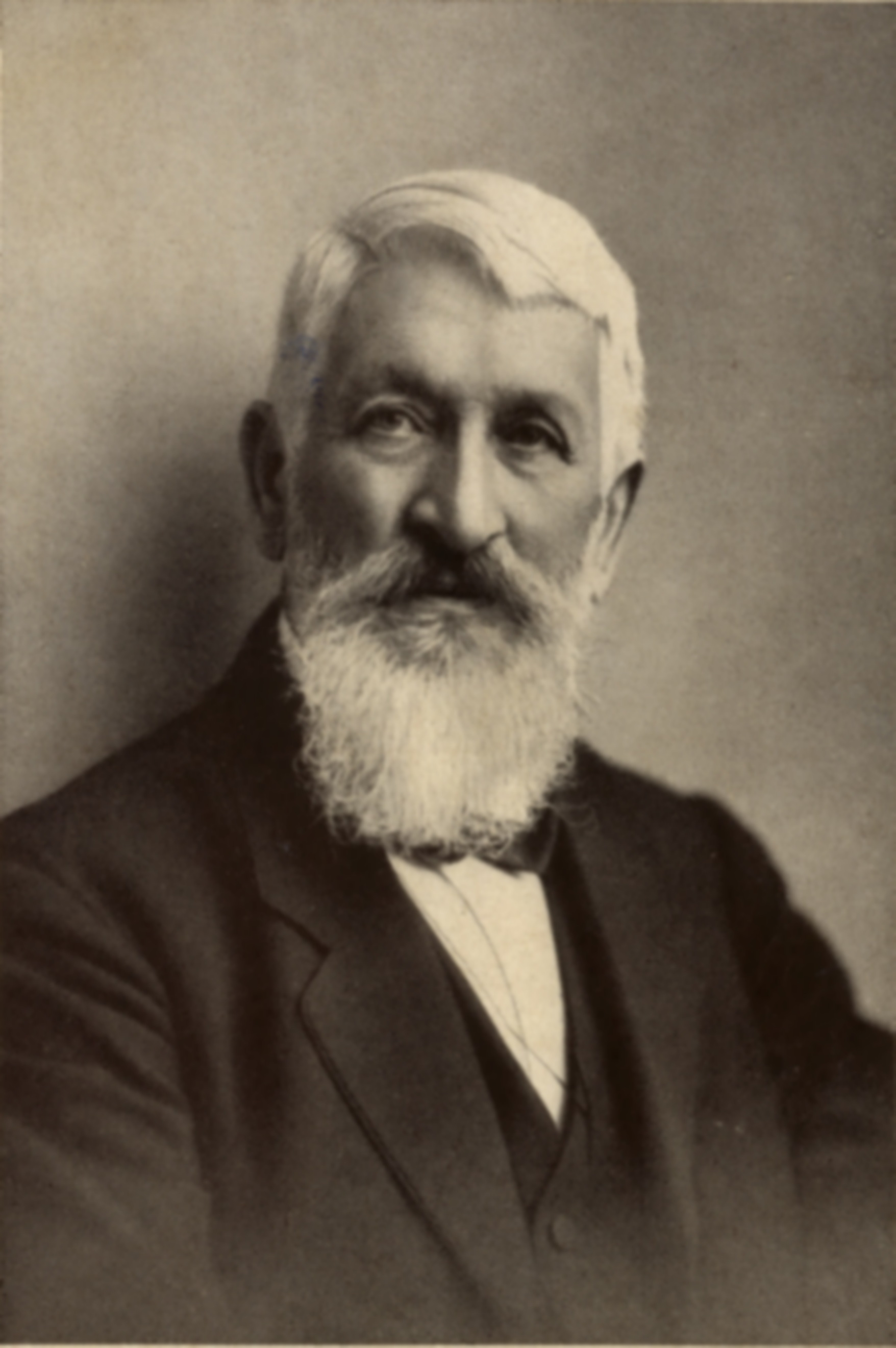
- Junod in 1912
- Born: 17 June 1863; Saint-Martin, Val-de-Ruz, Switzerland
- Died: 22 April 1934 (aged 70); Geneva, Switzerland
- Scientific career
- Fields: missionary; ethnographer; anthropologist; linguist; naturalist

Henri-Alexandre Junod (17 June 1863 in Saint-Martin, Val-de-Ruz – 22 April 1934 in Geneva) was a Swiss-born South African missionary, ethnographer, anthropologist, linguist and naturalist, stationed for much of his career at Shiluvane mission station outside Tzaneen in Limpopo Province. He received an early training in Protestant ministry at Neuchâtel, Basel and Berlin. He was one of the founding members of the Lemana Training College at Njhakanjhaka village near the Township of Waterval at Elim in 1906. Together with Reverend Creux of Valdezia mission station, he codified the language of the Tsonga people, which they called 'Thonga', but later renamed Xitsonga. Together with a group of Swiss Missionaries, such as Georges Liengme, he helped in the establishment of Elim Hospital in 1899.

He came from a family of clergy and missionaries and in 1885 received holy orders as a Protestant minister in the Independent Church of Neuchâtel. In 1887, after being accepted by the Mission Suisse Romande, he was sent to Edinburgh to study English and medicine.

Junod sailed for Mozambique in 1889 and was stationed at Rikatla Mission, some 30 km north of Lourenço Marques. In 1894 he was working from Lourenço Marques. Some of his early collections were from Pinetown and Howick. He soon published a Ronga grammar, which was followed by essays on the lifestyle and language of the Ronga. In 1896 he returned to Switzerland and stayed until 1899 when he founded an evangelical school at Shiluvane, returning once again in 1906 to Switzerland. During his term at Shiluvane he escaped from the Lowveld heat and fevers by living in a hut on a nearby mountain called Mamotseeri or Mamotsuiri. In 1917 he founded another evangelical school at Rikatla. Junod returned to Switzerland in 1921 but maintained his work and interest in African ethnography. His ashes were interred at Rikatla.

'The Life of a South African Tribe', which is about the life of Tsonga people, was published in two volumes in 1912, an enlarged version being printed in 1926 and 1962. The work has been translated into several languages and is highly regarded.

Junod was an exceptional scholar, a member of many societies and with wide interests in the world of natural history, amassing extensive collections of beetles and butterflies. His ethnographer son, Henri-Philippe Junod (1897–1987), wrote a biography 'Henri-A. Junod, Missionaire et Savant, 1863–1934'. Additionally, several biographical dictionaries or encyclopaedias feature entries on Junod, including The international encyclopedia of the social sciences (1968), the Concise dictionary of the Christian world mission (1971), the Dictionary of South African biography (1972), and the Standard encyclopedia of Southern Africa (1974). Of these, the entry in The international encyclopedia of the social sciences, by Junod's granddaughter Violaine Junod, is the most detailed.

In November 2025, cultural items that were taken by Henri almost a century ago were returned to South Africa. The items, which included a carved wooden stick, a divination basket, and a bovine astragalus amulet, were originally owned by the Nkuna royal family of Shiluvane in Limpopo and were used in ritual and spiritual ceremonies dating back to the 19th century. Henri-Alexandre Junod took these items to Neuchâtel and were kept at Musée d'ethnographie de Neuchâtel.
