= Musée d'ethnographie de Neuchâtel =

Museum in Neuchâtel, Switzerland

Neuchâtel Ethnography Museum
- Musée d'ethnographie de Neuchâtel
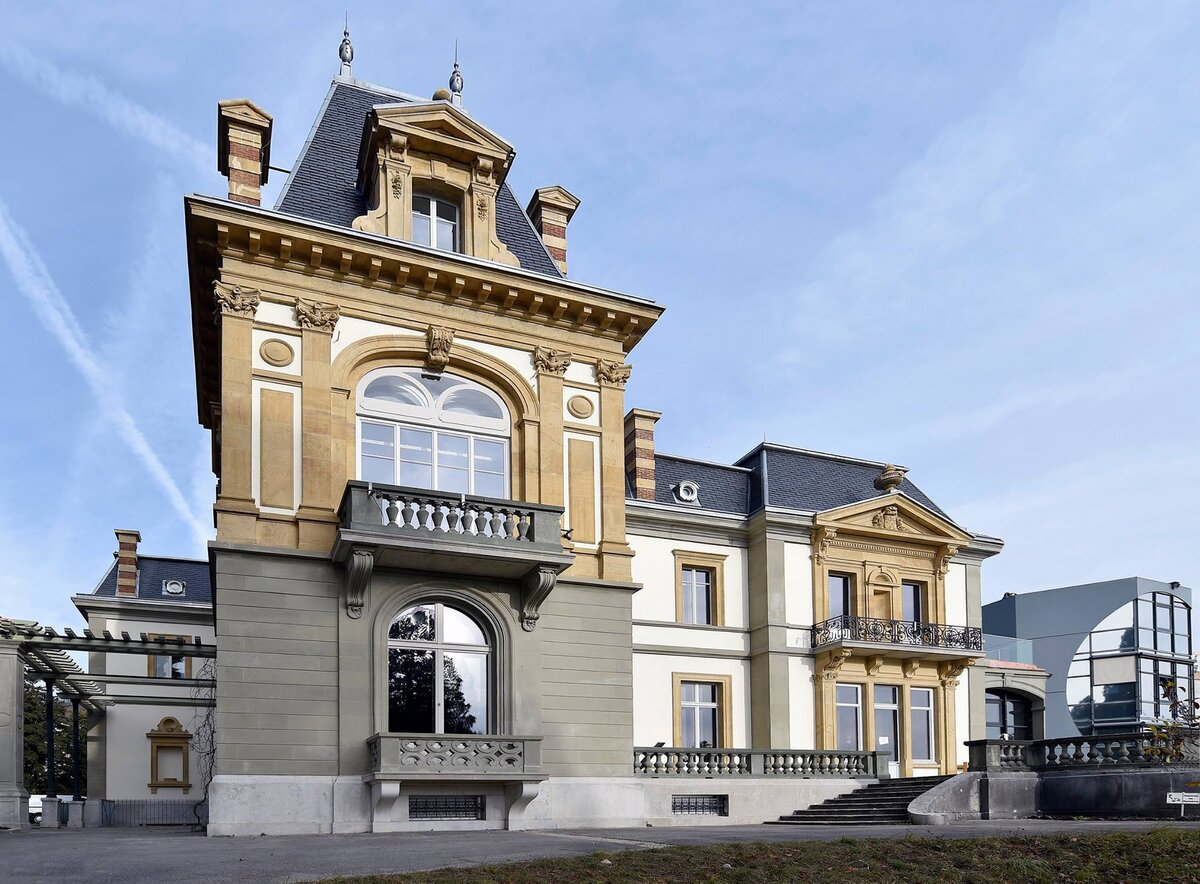
- Established: 14 July 1904; 122 years ago
- Location: 4 rue St-Nicolas, 2000 Neuchâtel
- Coordinates: 46.990697°N 6.920485°E
- Type: Ethnographic
- Collections: Ethnographic objects from all continents, industrial objects, musical instruments, movies and photographs
- Collection size: 50,000
- Directors: Yann Laville and Grégoire Mayor
- Website: www.men.ch

The Musée d'ethnographie de Neuchâtel (MEN) is a museum of ethnography in Neuchâtel, Switzerland established in 1904. The collections consist of 50,000 objects from all regions of the world, with about half from Africa. The MEN is well known for its museology of the rupture (muséololgie de la rupture), initiated by Jacques Hainard in the 1980s. This exhibition policy aims at questioning the objects' meaning and the museum's social role.

Starting in 2015, major renovations were undertaken on the museum's buildings. The historical part was renovated first, followed by the temporary exhibitions building, ending in 2020.

Since 2017 the reference exhibition is L'impermanence des choses, centered on the museum's collections.

== History ==
=== The collections before the establishment of the museum ===
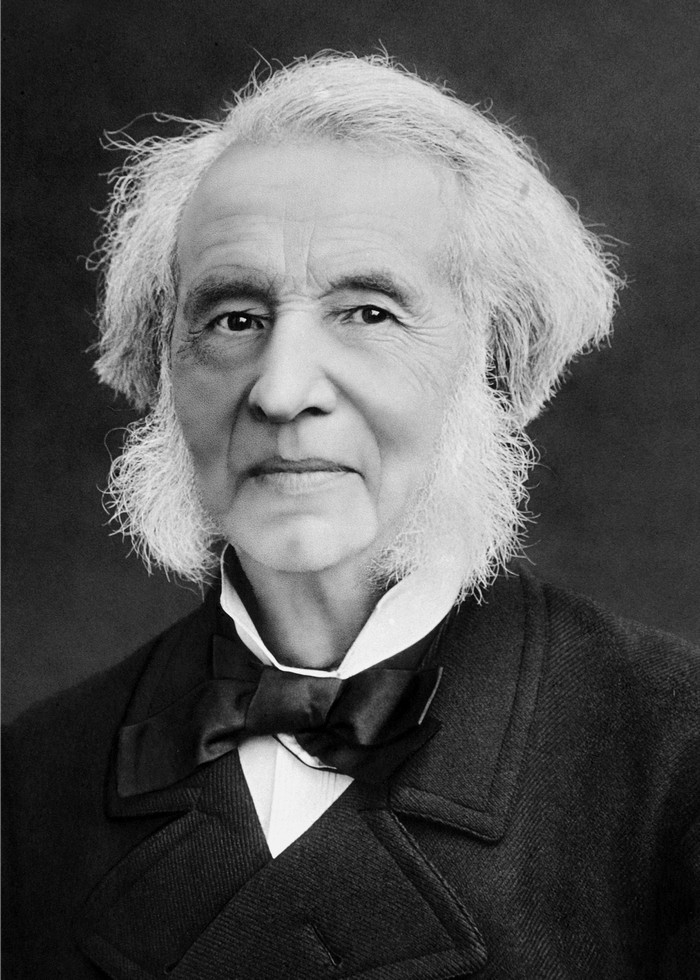
James-Ferdinand de Pury

The collections' first objects came from Charles Daniel de Meuron's cabinet of natural history donated to the city in 1795. The cabinet included two hundred ethnographic pieces, originating in Oceania, Asia and Africa (by order of abundance). During the early 19th century, the collections were a mix of objects that would later form the basis for the museums of Natural History, Arts and History and Ethnography. Throughout the century, the ethnographic collections grew in size and were moved around multiple times, often lacking sufficient space according to their curators.

=== The museum on Saint-Nicolas's hill ===
In 1902,James-Ferdinand de Pury bequeathed his villa on Saint-Nicolas's hill to the city of Neuchâtel, under condition that it be turned into an ethnographic museum. The villa was renovated by Léo Châtelain who had also been the villa's architect. Finally, the ethnographic museum was inaugurated on July 14, 1904.

Since 1904 the collections kept growing thanks, on the one hand, to the donations of numerous travelers, merchants, scholars, and missionaries from Neuchâtel, and on the other hand due to the acquisitions of targeted objects, in Neuchâtel, abroad, and during scientific expeditions. The museum also exhibits diplomatic gifts received by Switzerland. For example, a group of dolls wearing traditional costumes of multiple people from the Soviet Union.

The museum has gathered a significant collection of contemporary objects, mass made by industrial means. These objects are part of the museum's reflection on itself and what brings an object to be considered worthy of being in a museum.

=== Buildings ===
Over the years two buildings were added to the Villa de Pury and completed the museum. First, the Black Box, built in 1954–1955 during the tenure of Jean Gabus. It hosts temporary exhibitions. Its facade is decorated with a massive 166.5 m^{2} fresco, Les Conquêtes de l'homme, painted by Hans Erni. The fresco was completely restored in 1986. Also in 1986, a building for the Ethnology Institute of the University of Neuchâtel was built and links the Villa de Pury to the Black Box. The institute includes a library shared between the museum and the university. In 2004, the museum celebrated its centenary with numerous events.

Due to the lack of space, a competition for an extension was announced in 2004 to mark the 100th anniversary of the museum. Raphael Zuber and Helena Brobäck won first prize together with Conzett Bronzini Gartmann, but the project was not realized and another project was implemented at a later date. Christian Kerez was one of the members of the jury.

The Villa de Pury was renovated and its contents were reorganized from 2015 to 2017. Following this reorganization, the new reference exhibition, L'impermanence des choses opened its doors on November 26, 2017. The Black Box was also renovated, the collections that occupied the basement were moved to a deposit outside of the MEN freeing the space for exhibitions. During the year 2023, the stored collections (as well as those of the natural history museum, the Musée d'Art et d'Histoire and of the botanical garden) will join a deposit in Serrières, to the west of Neuchâtel.

== Exhibitions ==
Since the 1980s, under the leadership of Jacques Hainard and his successors, the MEN has developed a "museology of rupture" (muséologie de la rupture), an original approach to exhibitions that contributed to its popularity. This exhibition policy questions the audience's perception of the objects, their roles and meaning inside the museum. The role of the museum as a social institution is also studied.

Since the addition of the Black Box in the 1950s, the museum has given diverging exhibition tenets to its two buildings. The villa hosts the reference exhibitions and is focused on the collections and museology subjects. The Black Box welcomes temporary exhibitions. These will develop a discourse that is supported by a mix of objects from the collections and new objects, bought specifically for the exhibition.

=== Reference exhibition: L'impermanence des choses ===
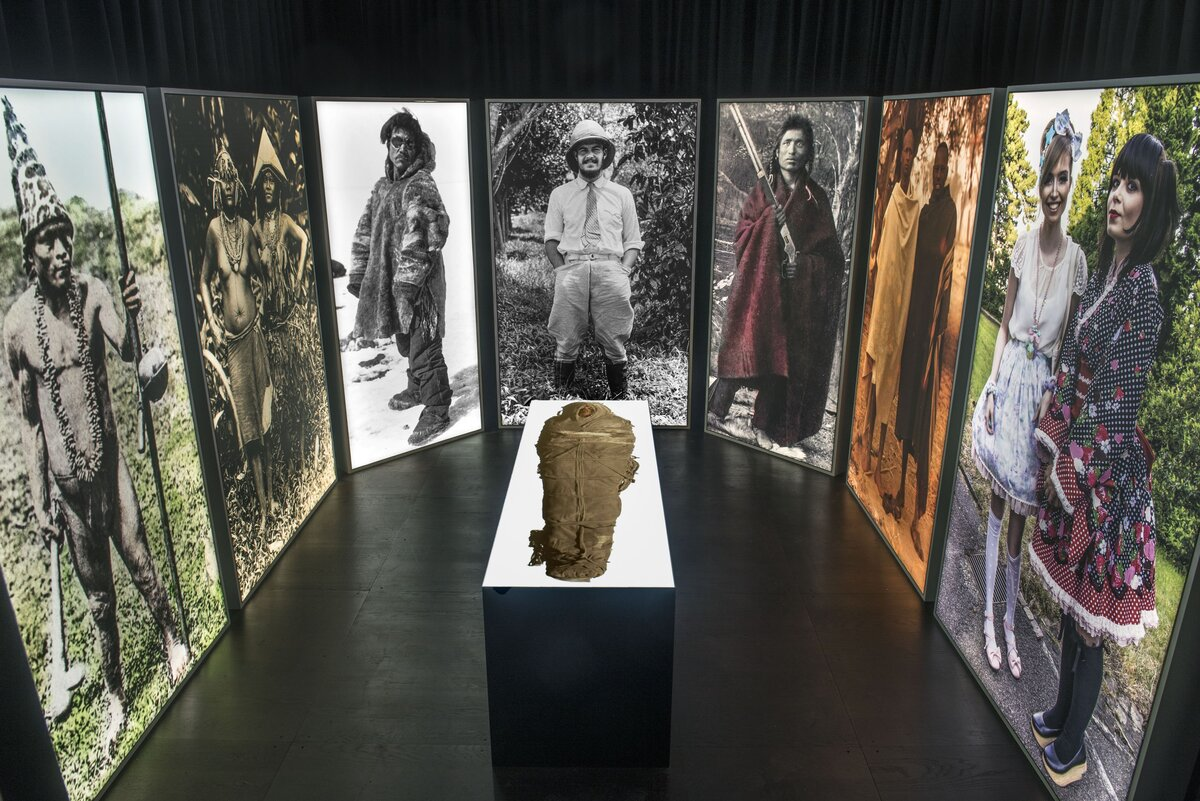
Au-delà (Beyond) room in L'impermanence des choses

The museum's reference exhibitions have always had the collections at the center of their discourse. From 2007 to 2012, the Museum presented an exhibition entitled Retour d'Angola. It was looking back at the second Swiss scientific mission to Angola carried out between 1932 and 1933 and organized by the curator at the time, Théodore Delachaux. By studying its own history, the museum was able to pinpoint paradoxes in the practice of ethnology and museology.

Following the renovation and reorganization of the villa in 2015–2017, a new reference exhibition opened on November 25, 2017, L'impermanence des choses. The exhibition looks at both the museum's collections and its history. The title references the way our view of the collections is constantly shifting. The exhibition focuses strongly on the museum's social role. The exhibition is modular, with spaces that can be renewed independently of each other.

=== Temporary exhibitions ===
The museum started temporary exhibitions during the tenure of Théodore Delachaux (from 1921 to 1945). However, these really took off under the leadership of Jean Gabus, with the addition of the Black Box. During his time, exhibitions would vary between scientific missions results, universal themes and presentations of prestigious collections. After him, the exhibitions under Jacques Hainard asserted the reputation of the MEN as an institution questioning the legitimacy of its own social role as a museum.

The recognition of the MEN resulted in numerous exhibitions being widely commented on. To cite a few, under Hainard, there is notably Objets prétextes, objets manipulés (1984), and La grande illusion (2000); then, under Marc-Olivier Gonseth, La marque jeune (2008), and Helvetia Park (2009); and finally, under the current direction, Derrière les cases de la mission (2020).

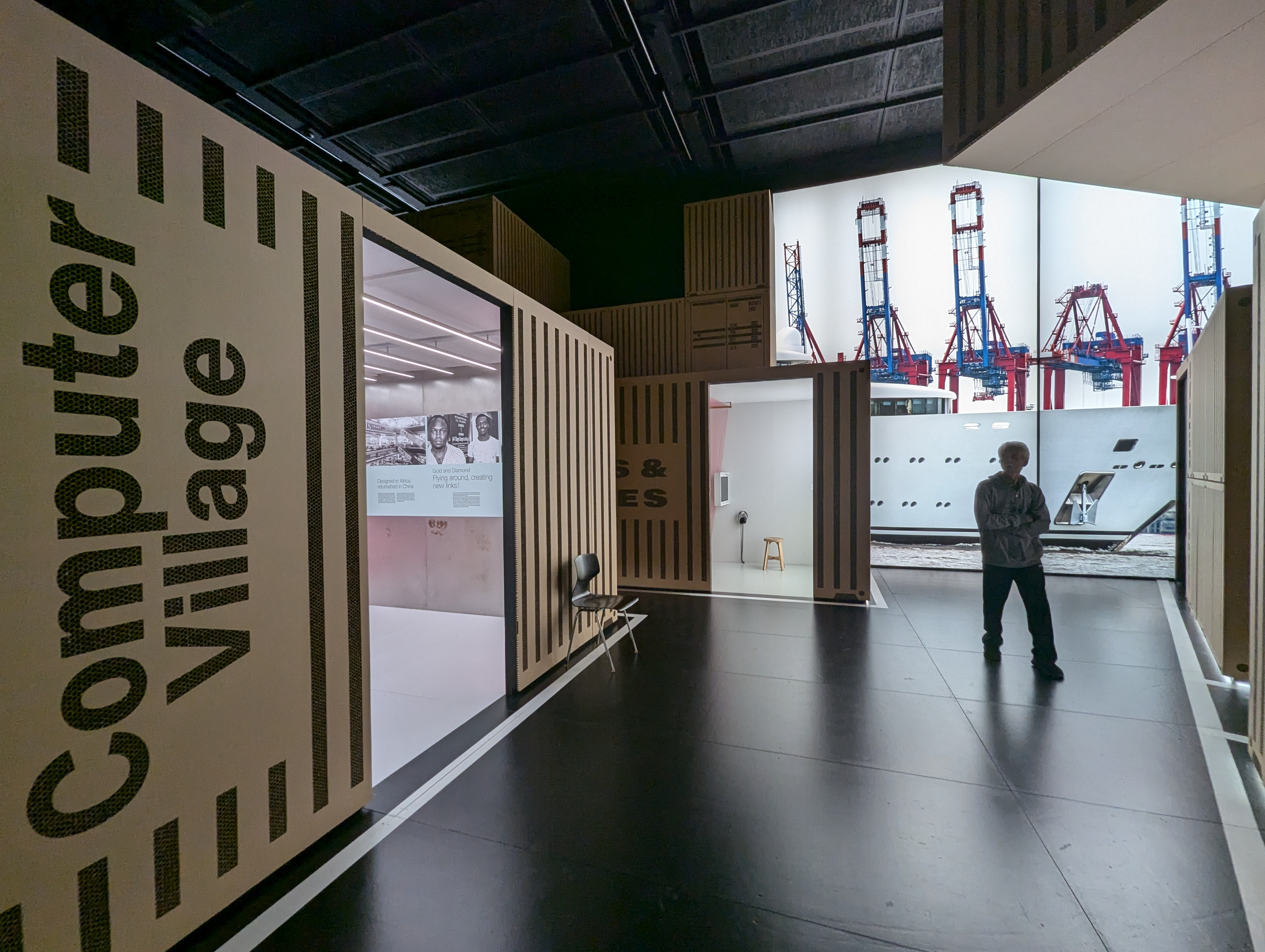
Cargo type exhibits

From 2020 to 2021 the museum presented the temporary exhibition Le mal du voyage, which invited the audience to question tourist practices. Since June 2022, the temporary exhibition is L'impossible sauvage, which explores the apparent opposition between the wild and the civilized and the limits of such concepts. Installed on three levels in the Black Box, the exhibition is the largest ever carried out by the museum. With Cargo Cults Unlimited launched in December 2024, the MEN addresses the abundant theme of the globalized economy. The exhibition has been extended till 18 January 2026.

In November 2025, cultural items such as a carved wooden stick, a divination basket, and a bovine astragalus amulet which were originally owned by the Nkuna royal family of Shiluvane in Limpopo and used in ritual and spiritual ceremonies dating back to the 19th century were returned to South Africa.These items were originally collected in South Africa by Protestant missionary Henri-Alexandre Junod (1863–1934) from Neuchâtel, who lived and worked in the region from 1889 to 1921.

== The park ==
Designed and built with the villa in the 1870s, the park is part of an idea of continuity between nature and the house. It is managed by the parks and promenades department of the city of Neuchâtel. Covering an area of 8000 m^{2}, it is home to many remarkable trees, including three giant sequoias over 30 m high. Those trees, originating in the New World are part of the architect's will to create an impression of untouched wilderness around the villa. Not having undergone complete renovation since its construction, the park is scheduled for renovation.

In an effort to highlight the park, the museum has started presenting temporary exhibitions in the grounds. The first, Mirages de l'objectif, is based on photographs of the Wodaabe taken by Henry Brandt in Niger in 1953 started in 2021. It is a photographic exhibition accessible to anyone entering the park. Moreover, many works of art are permanently exhibited in the park. Among those, there is a slit drum brought from the island of Ambrym in the Vanuatu archipelago. Another remarkable piece, an inuksuk is also present, built in 2019 by Piita Irniq. For its author, the inuksuk represents strength, survival and hope; it creates a link between the Inuit and the people of Neuchâtel.

== Curators and directors ==
The first curator was Louis de Coulon, between 1829 and 1894, who was also director of the city's museums. Frédéric DuBois de Montperreux collaborated to the direction from 1840 to 1848. After de Coulon, Frédéric de Bosset lead from 1886 to 1892. Under the leadership of Charles Knapp, the ethnographic collections became the museum in 1904. He was curator from 1892 to 1921. He was succeeded by Théodore Delachaux from 1921 to 1945. Delachaux notably led an ethnographic expedition to Angola between 1932 and 1933. Jean Gabus, his successor made expeditions to meet the Caribou Inuit west of Hudson Bay, as well as in Africa. He was director between 1945 and 1978, followed by Jacques Hainard from 1980 to 2006, then by Marc-Olivier Gonseth from 2006 to 2018. The MEN has since been co-directed by Grégoire Mayor and Yann Laville.

== Collections ==
Thanks to numerous expeditions carried out by the museum, donations from various personalities and purchases by the museum, various collections have been put together. They amount to more than 50,000 objects.

- African collections (Angola, Gabon, Mauritania, Sahara and Sahel)
- American collections
- Arctic collections
- European collections
- Oceanian collections
- Ancient Egypt collections
- Sound related collections (musical instruments and sound archives)
- Movie collection

== Gallery ==
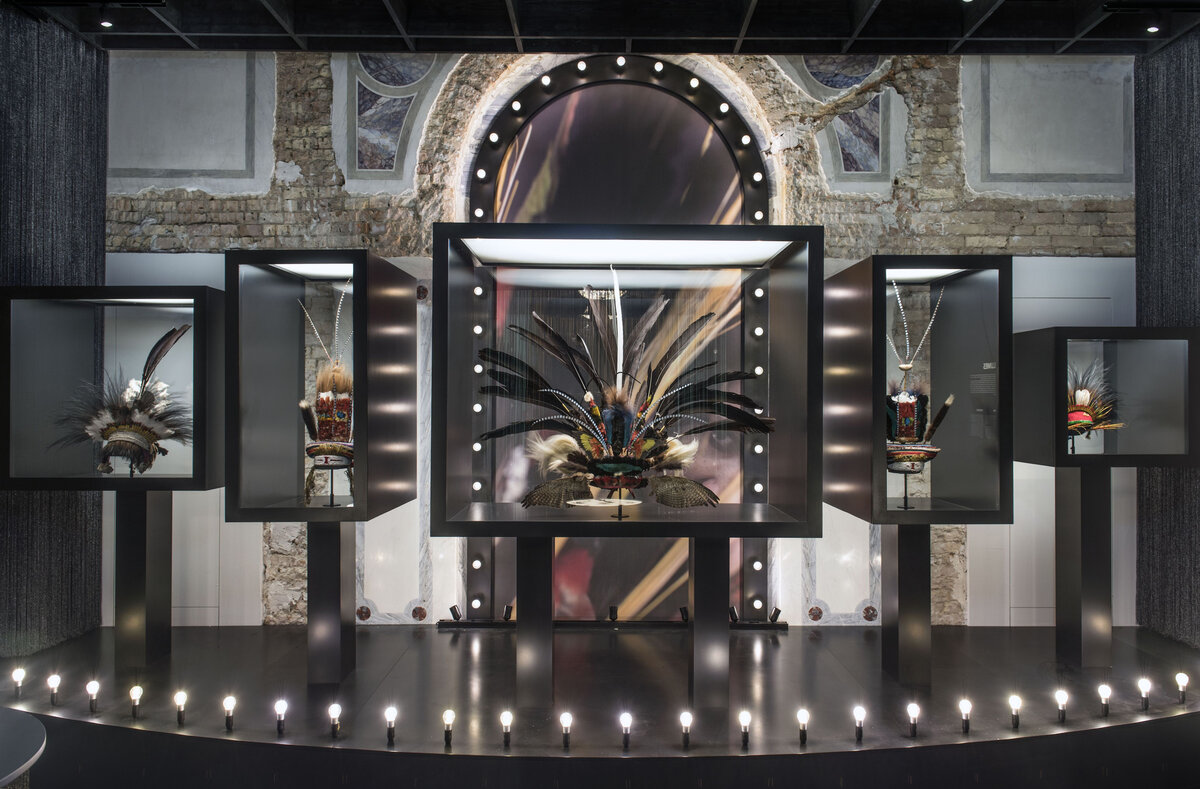
The room Plumes (Feathers).

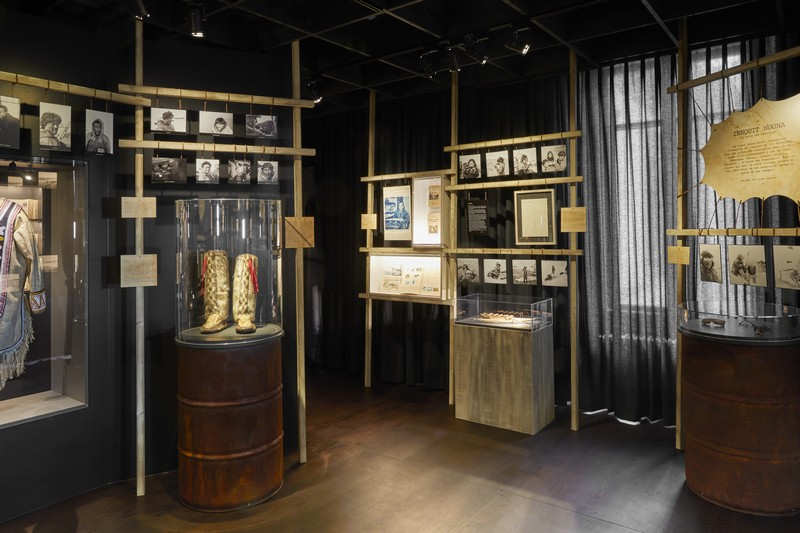
The room Ichoumamini.

== See also ==
- List of museums in Switzerland
