= Tswa–Ronga languages =

Group of Southern Bantu languages

Tswa–Ronga
- Geographic distribution: Mozambique, South Africa, Zimbabwe
- Linguistic classification: Niger–Congo?: Atlantic–Congo; Volta-Congo; Benue–Congo; Bantoid; Southern Bantoid; Bantu; Southern Bantu; Nguni-Tsonga; Tswa–Ronga

Language codes
- Glottolog: tswa1254

The Tswa–Ronga languages (or just Tsonga) are a group of closely related Southern Bantu languages spoken in Southern Africa chiefly in southern Mozambique, northeastern South Africa and southeastern Zimbabwe.

== Languages ==
The group is divided into three main languages:

- Tswa–Ronga
  - Tswa (Xitswa): Hlengwe (Khambana-Makwakwe, Khambani, Lengwe, Lhengwe, Makwakwe-Khambana, Shilengwe), Tshwa (Dzibi-Dzonga, Dzivi, Dzonga-Dzibi, Xidzivi), Mandla, Ndxhonge, Nhayi. Partially intelligible with Ronga [rng] and Tsonga [tso].
  - Ronga (Xironga): Konde, Putru, Kalanga. Partially intelligible with Tsonga [tso] and Tswa [tsc].
  - Tsonga (Xitsonga): Luleke (Xiluleke), Gwamba (Gwapa), Changana (Xichangana), Hlave, Kande, N’walungu (Shingwalungu), Xonga (Ssonga), Jonga (Dzonga), Nkuna, Songa, Nhlanganu (Shihlanganu).

"Tsonga" is used to refer to all three languages, although often used interchangeably with Changana, the most prestigious of the three. All are recognized as languages, although inherently intelligible. The group also contains a variety of other minority languages and dialects which are undocumented and exist in an unwritten form.

== Writing system ==
The sintu writing system, Ditema tsa Dinoko (also known in Zulu as Isibheqe Sohlamvu), for Southern Bantu languages, is used to represent all Tswa-Ronga languages consistently under one orthography. This includes those marginal languages that have never been standardised in the Latin alphabet, such as the "East Sotho" varieties (Pulana, Khutswe and Pai). For example, it contains a specific grapheme indicating retroflex or "cerebral" consonants, such as the retroflex ejective affricate occurring here in Pai:

English	place	
HiPai	itzau	[iʈʂʼaːwu]
