= Ronga language =

Bantu language spoken in southern Africa

Ronga
- Native to: Mozambique, South Africa
- Native speakers: 720,000 (2006)
- Language family: Niger–Congo?: Atlantic–Congo; Volta-Congo; Benue–Congo; Bantoid; Southern Bantoid; Bantu; Southern Bantu; Tswa–Ronga; Ronga

Language codes
- ISO 639-3: rng
- Glottolog: rong1268
- Guthrie code: S.54
- Linguasphere: 99-AUT-dd incl. varieties 99-AUT-dda...-dde

Ronga, also known as XiRonga and Xizronga, is a Bantu language spoken in Maputo in Mozambique. It extends slightly into South Africa. The Xizronga language has its own dialects, which are: Xinondzrwana, Xizingili, Xihlanganu, and Xilwandle.

The Swiss philologist Henri-Alexandre Junod seems to have been the first linguist to have studied it, in the late 19th century.

== Phonology ==
	Front	Central	Back
Close	i		u
Mid	e		o
Open		a	

		Labio-(dental)		Alveolar		Lateral		Post-alveolar		Retroflex		Velar/ Glottal	
		plain	lab.	plain	lab.	plain	lab.	plain	lab.	plain	lab.	plain	lab.
Nasal	voiced	m		n	nʷ			ɲ	ɲʷ				ŋʷ
Nasal	breathy	mʱ		nʱ	nʷʱ								
Stop	voiceless	p		t	tʷ							k	kʷ
Stop	aspirated	pʰ		tʰ								kʰ	kʷʰ
Stop	voiced	b		d			dˡʷ					ɡ	ɡʷ
Stop	breathy	bʱ		dʱ								ɡʱ	ɡʷʱ
Stop	non-pulmonic	ɓ		ɗ				ɡǂ					
Affricate	voiceless	p̪f	psʷ	ts				tʃ		tʂ	tʂʷ		
Affricate	aspirated	p̪fʰ	psʷʰ	tsʰ				tʃʰ		tʂʰ			
Affricate	voiced	b̪v	bzʷ	dz				dʒ		dʐ	dʐʷ		
Affricate	breathy							dʒʱ					
Fricative	voiceless	f		s	sʷ	ɬ	ɬʷ	ʃ	ʃʷ				
Fricative	voiced	v		z				ʒ		ʐ	ʐʷ		
Fricative	breathy	vʱ											ɦ
Sonorant	voiced			r		l	lʷ	j					w
Sonorant	breathy												wʱ

== Alphabet ==
Its alphabet is similar to that of Tsonga as provided by Methodist missionaries and Portuguese settlers.

Methodist alphabet
Letter	A	B	C	D	E	G	H	I	J	K	L	M	N	Ṅ	O	P	R	S	Ŝ	T	U	V	W	X	Y	Z	Ẑ
Value	a	b~β	tʃ	d	e~ɛ	ɡ	h	i	dʒ	k	l	m	n	ŋ	ɔ~o	p	r	s	ʂ	t	u	v	w	ʃ	j	z	ʐ

1989 alphabet
Letter	A	B	By	Ch	D	E	G	H	Hl	I	J	K	L	Lh	M	N	Nʼ	O	P	Ps	R	S	Sv	Sw	T	U	V	Vh	W	X	Xj	Y	Z	Zv	Zw
Value	a	b~β	b͡ʐ	tʃ	d	e~ɛ	ɡ	h	ɬ	i	dʒ	k	l	ʎ	m	n	ŋ	ɔ~o	p	p͡ʂ	r	s	ʂ	sʷ	t	u	ʋ	v	w	ʃ	ʒ	j	z	ʐ	zʷ

== Grammar ==
Ronga is grammatically so close to Tsonga in many ways that census officials have often considered it a dialect; its noun class system is very similar and its verbal forms are almost identical. Its most immediately noticeable difference is a much greater influence from Portuguese, due to being centred near the capital Maputo (formerly Lourenço Marques).

== Literature ==
The first book to be published in Ronga was the Gospel of John translated mainly by Henri Berthoud from the Swiss Romande Mission. It was published by the British and Foreign Bible Society in 1896. Further translation was done by Pierre Loze from Mission Romande (Swiss Romande Mission) and H.L. Bishop (Wesleyan Methodist Missionary Society), assisted by Jeremia Caetano and Efraim Hely. The New Testament was published in 1903, and the whole Bible was published by the British and Foreign Bible Society in 1923.
