= Tsonga language =

Bantu language of the Tsonga people of Southern Africa

Tsonga
- Xitsonga
- Native to: Eswatini; Mozambique; South Africa; Zimbabwe
- Region: Gauteng; Limpopo; Mpumalanga; Inhambane Province; Gaza Province; Maputo Province; Maputo City; North West; Chiredzi District; Mwenenzi District
- Ethnicity: VaTsonga
- Native speakers: 3.7 million (2006–2011); 3.4 million L2 speakers in South Africa (2002)
- Language family: Niger–Congo?: Atlantic–Congo; Volta-Congo; Benue–Congo; Bantoid; Southern Bantoid; Bantu; Southern Bantu; Tswa–Ronga; Tsonga
- Writing system: Latin (Tsonga alphabet); Tsonga Braille
- Signed forms: Signed Tsonga

Official status
- Official language in: South Africa; Zimbabwe (as 'Shangani')
- Recognised minority language in: Mozambique

Language codes
- ISO 639-1: ts
- ISO 639-2: tso
- ISO 639-3: tso
- Glottolog: tson1249
- Guthrie code: S.53 (S.52)
- Linguasphere: 99-AUT-dc incl. varieties 99-AUT-dca... -dcg

Tsonga
- Person: Mutsonga
- People: Vatsonga
- Language: Xitsonga

Geographical description of Tsonga in South Africa: proportion of the population that speaks a form of Tsonga at home

Tsonga (/ˈ(t)sɒŋɡə/ (T)SONG-gə), or Xitsonga (/ʃiˈtsɒŋ.ɡə/ shee-TSONG-gə) as an endonym (also known as Changana in Mozambique), is a Bantu language spoken by the Tsonga people of South Africa and Mozambique. It is mutually intelligible with Tswa and Ronga and the name "Tsonga" is often used as a cover term for all three, also sometimes referred to as Tswa-Ronga. The Xitsonga language has been standardised as a written language.

Tsonga is an official language of the Republic of South Africa, and under the name Shangani it is recognised as an official language in the Constitution of Zimbabwe. All Tswa-Ronga languages are recognised in Mozambique. It is not official in Eswatini (formerly known as Swaziland).

== History ==
The first records of studies of Xitsonga by Europeans go back the Swiss missionary, Henri-Alexandre Junod, who between the years 1890 and 1920 hypothesised that the Xitsonga language (which he called the Thonga language) consolidated itself in Mozambique before the 1400s. In his own words, Junod states the following:

My conclusion is then that the Thonga language was already-spoken by the primitive occupants of the country more than 500 years ago and that, together with a certain number of customs, it formed the great bond which bound the Thonga clans together in past centuries.

Further studies were carried out by Junod and other Swiss missionaries such as Henri Berthoud and Ernest Creux, who began work on a standard written language, which they called Shigwamba. The term was however unfamiliar to many of the speakers, and was later replaced with Thonga/Tsonga. Other Swiss missionaries working alongside Tsonga people translated the Christian Bible from English and Sesotho into Tsonga.

In 1996, the language was officially recognized as Xitsonga within the Constitution of South Africa (Act 108 of 1996), which declared it an official language of the nation. The standardization of the Xitsonga language has since strengthened the position of language as a medium for communication.

== Etymology ==
The name "Tsonga" is the root of Xitsonga (culture, language or ways of the Tsonga) Mutsonga (a Tsonga person), Vatsonga (Tsonga people), etc. In the language of the Vatsonga themselves, the root never appears by itself. It is Tsonga for the ease and accessibility of the wider international community.

As for the origins of the name, there are three theories. The first states that Tsonga is another pronunciation for Dzonga, which means "South" and also the name of one of the dialects of Xitsonga. The second theory is that it is an alternative spelling of the old ancestral name of the Chopi and Tembe groups, Tonga/Thonga. The other Zulu explanation for the alternative spelling of "Thonga" is that the Tembe and Rhonga people, who were the first to arrive at the Delagoa Bay and around the Natal Bay, transitioned the Rhonga "Rh" into the Zulu form of "Th". An example is rhuma (Tsonga word for "send") becoming thuma (Zulu word for the same action). The third and most accepted is that it is another pronunciation for "Rhonga", the root for the word "vurhonga" for east or the direction where the sun rises. Vurhonga also means dawn in Xitsonga. Rhonga (commonly and wrongly spelt as Ronga) is one of the Tsonga languages. The physical evidence of most Tsonga people residing along the eastern coast of Africa in the south, extending inland in a westward direction, makes this explanation especially inviting. However Junod had initially used the Ronga appellation but had also realized that the northern clans did not frequently use the name 'Ronga' as their identity name, but most certainly Tsonga is a derivation of Ronga.

Much of the written history about the Tsonga regards the aftermath of the mfecane where the Nguni people overran many of the pre-existing African tribes of South Africa, Eswatini, Mozambique, and Zimbabwe.

== Languages and dialects ==
Tsonga dialects
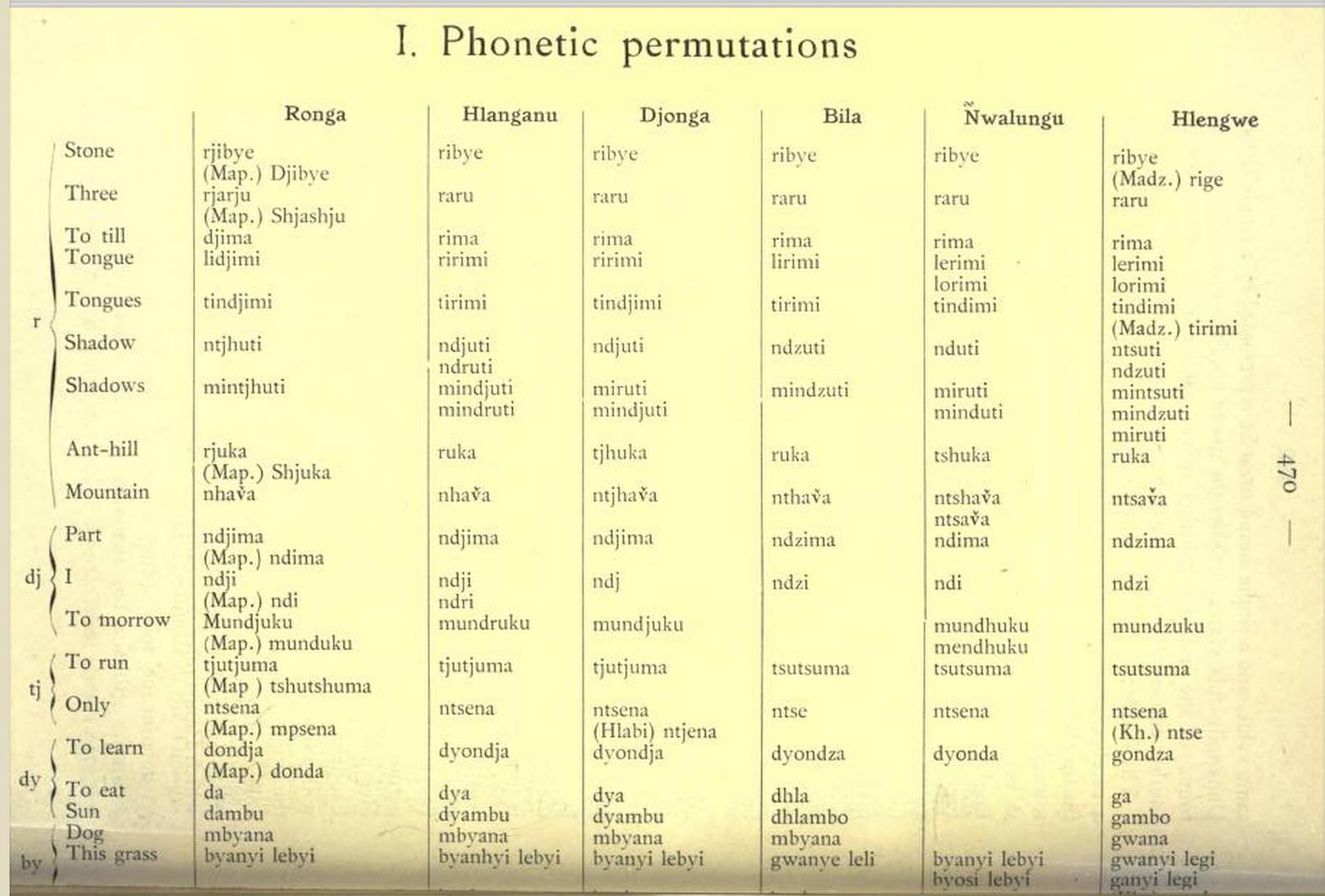
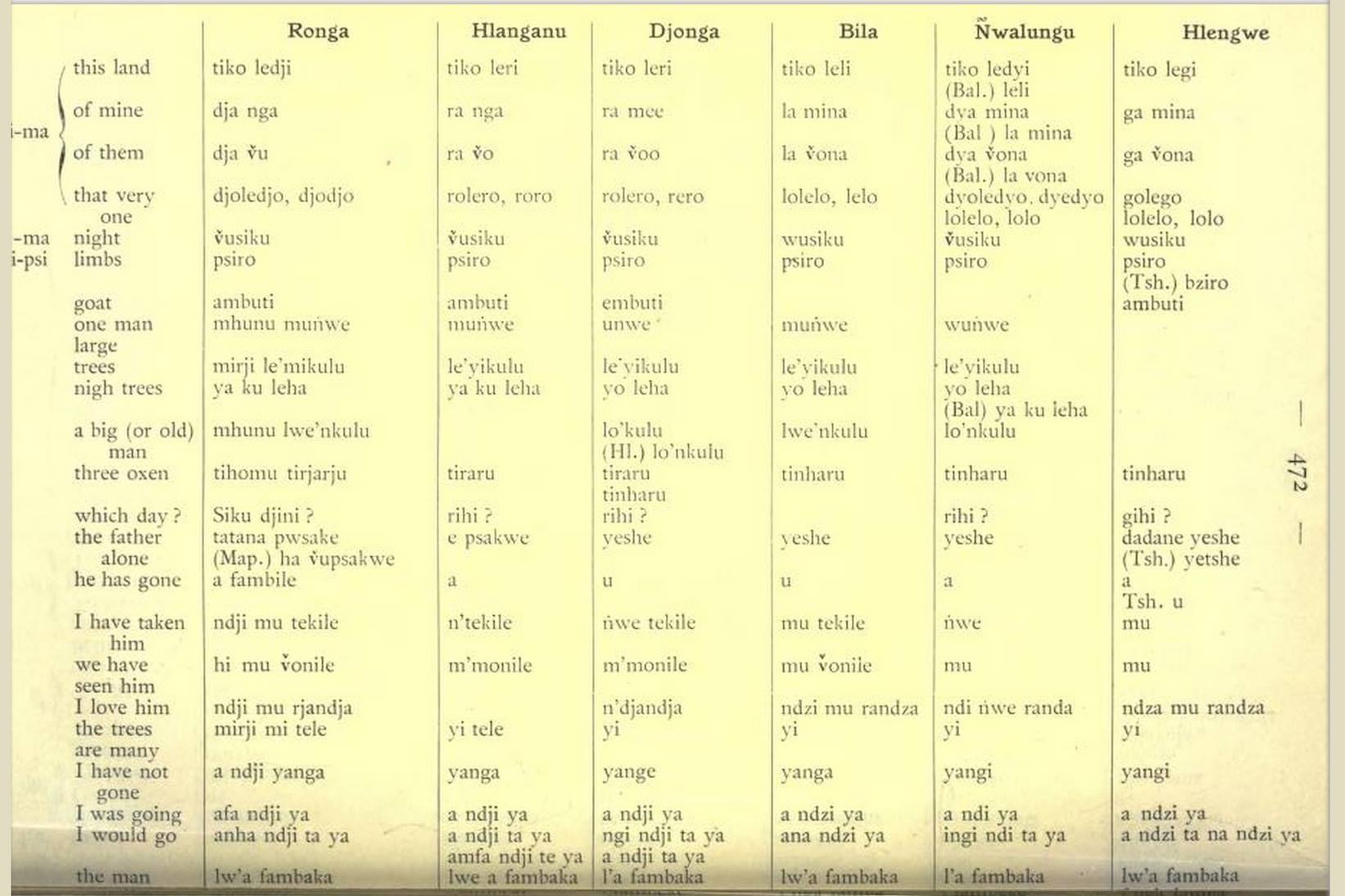
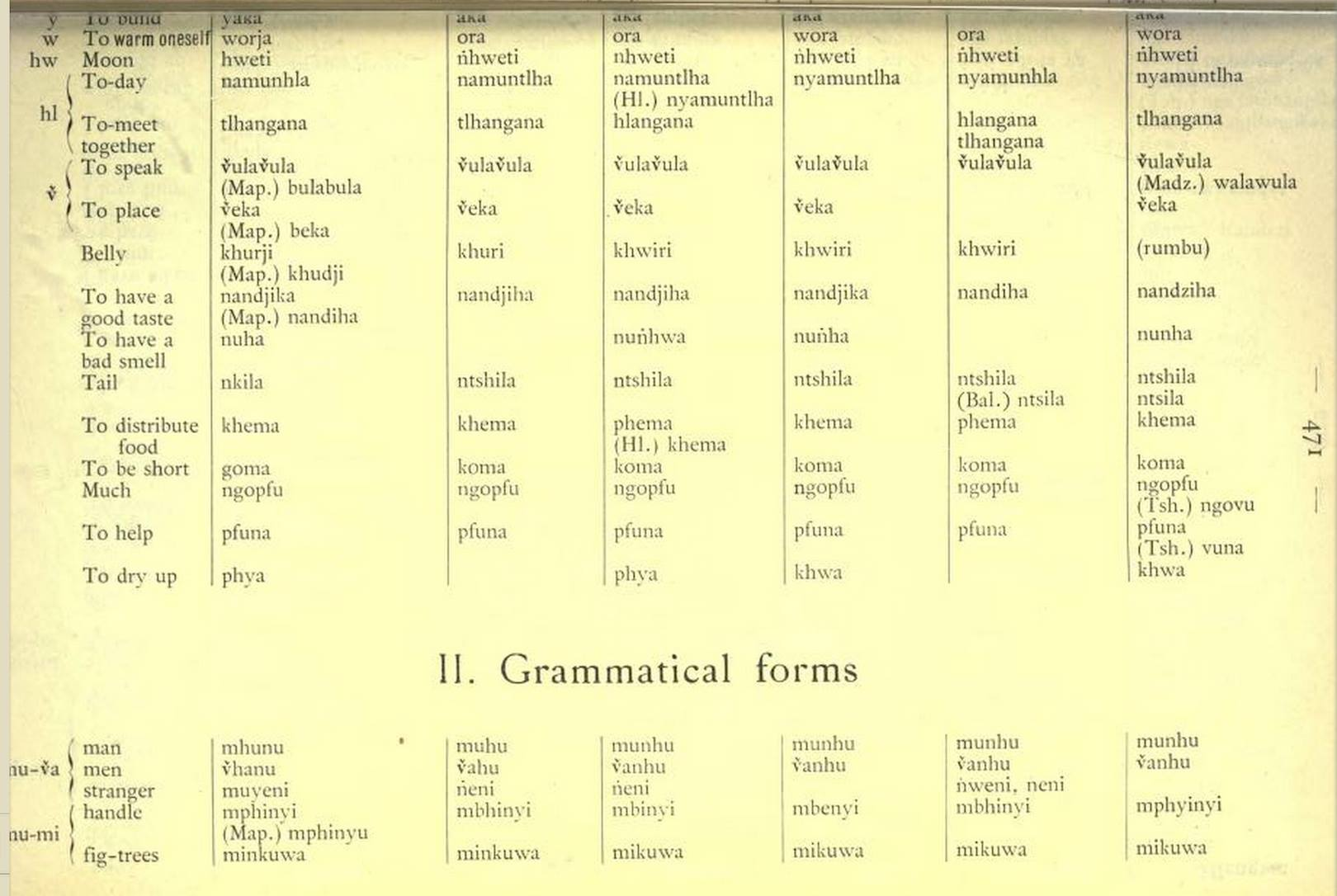
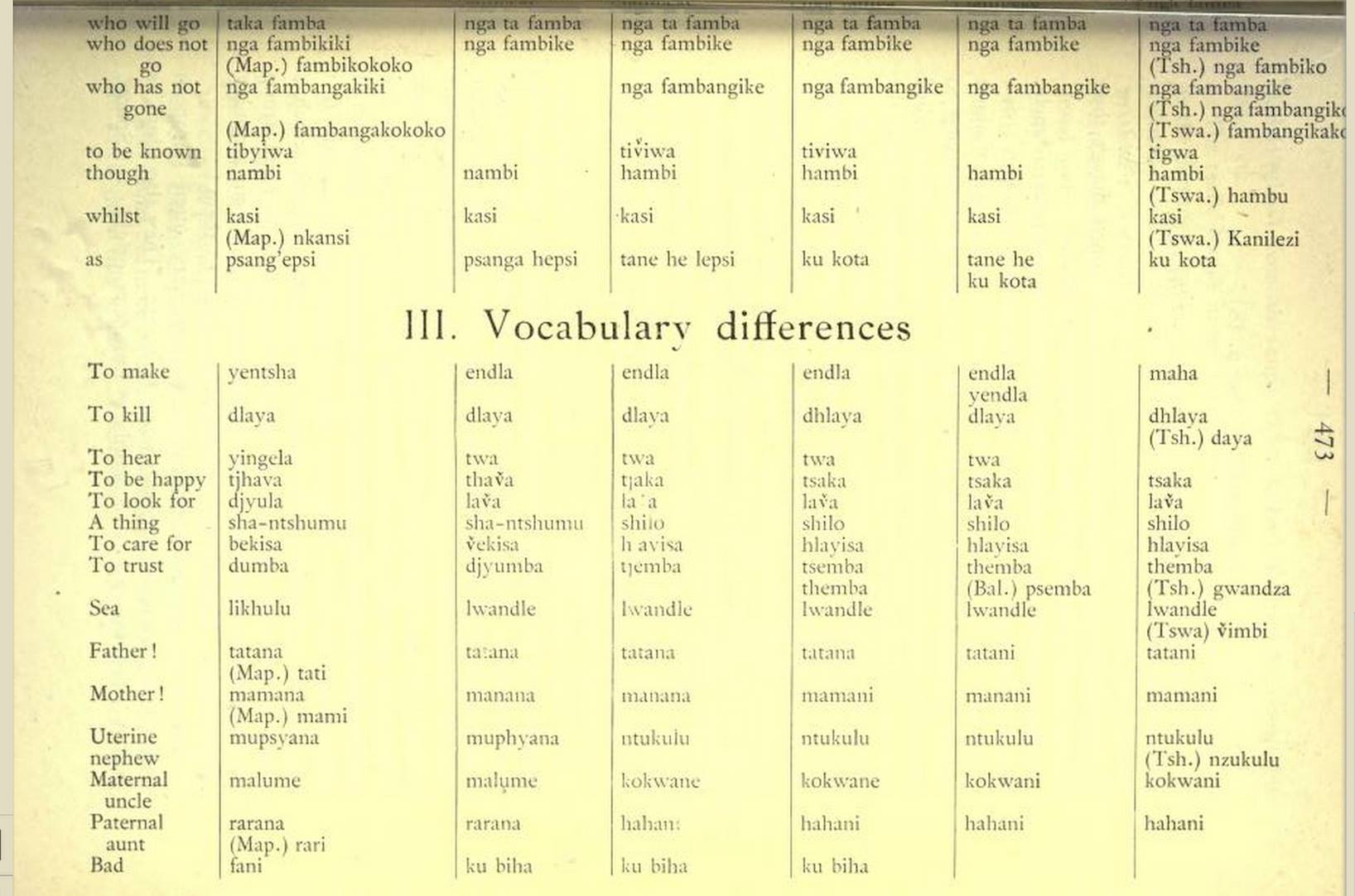

Tsonga is a Bantu language (Guthrie code S.53), closely related to other members to the Tswa-Ronga group (S.50):

1. Ronga (Rhonga) dialects are Kalanga (Xinyisa, Xindindindi (Xizingili), Putru, and Xinyondroma.
2. Chopi dialects are Bila (Vila), Djonga (Dzonga, Jonga), Hlanganu (Langanu, Nhlanganu), Hlave (Mbayi, Nkuna, Pai), Kande, Khosa, Luleke, N'walungu (Ngwalungu), Nkuma, Songa, Valoyi, Xika, and Xonga.
3. Tswa (Tshwa) dialects are Dzibi (Dzivi), Dzibi-Dzonga (Dzivi-Dzonga), Tshwa, Hlengwe (Lengwe, Lhenge), Khambani, Makwakwe-Khambani, Mandla, Ndxhonge, and Nhayi (Nyai, Nyayi).

Some dialects are subdialects but have been mentioned here for completeness. For example, Valoyi and Luleke comprise the N'walungu dialect. Tswa-Ronga dialects not considered part of the family include Pulana (Xipulana, Sepulane). What is commonly referred to as "Shangana/Changana" is not a recognised language in South Africa and is not a dialect that falls within the Xitsonga language group, as its distinctiveness stems mainly from the use of the Nguni language and grammar.

Only six Thonga/Tsonga dialects exist and these were identified by the dawn of the 1900s. These are namely xiRonga, xiHlanganu, xiBila, xiDjonga, xiN'walungu, and xiHlengwe. All other variations within South Africa are sub-dialects of the aforementioned. The dialects most spoken in the rural communities of Limpopo are the N'walungu, Bila, Hlengwe, and the Hlanganu dialects. The Xitsonga vocabulary and phonetic permutations are also largely based on these dialects (cf. Junod 1912, p. 470–473)

For "language of", the various languages and dialects employ one or more of the following prefixes: Bi-, Chi-, Ci-, Gi-, Ici-, Ki-, Ma-, Shee-, Shi-, Txi-, Va-, Wa-, and Xi-. For "people of", they use either "Ba-" or "Va-".

== Orthography ==
Letter	IPA value	Letter	IPA value	Letter	IPA value	Letter	IPA value
a	a	p	p	pf	p̪f	ff	ɸ
aa	aː	ph	pʰ	pfh	p̪fʰ	v	β
e	ɛ	py	pʲ	bv	b̪v	f	f
ee	ɛː	phy	pʲʰ	bvh	b̪vʱ	vh	v, vʱ
i	i	b	b	ts	ts	s	s
ii	iː	bh	bʱ	tsh	tsʰ, tsᶲʰ	sw	sʷ, sᶲ
o	ɔ	by	bʲ	tsw	tsʷ, tsᶲ	z	z
oo	ɔː	bhy	bʲʱ	dz	dz	zw	zʷ
u	u	t	t	dzh	dzʱ	hl	ɬ
uu	uː	th	tʰ	dzhw	dzʷʱ	hlw	ɬʷ
r	r	tw	tʷ	dzw	dzᵝ	l	l
rh	rʱ	the	tʷʰ	dhl	dɮ	lw	lʷ
rw	rʷ	ty	tʲ	c	tʃ	x	ʃ
rhw	rʷʱ	thy	tʲʰ	ch	tʃʰ	xw	ʃʷ
m	m	d	d	cw	tʃʷ	xj	ʒ
mh	mʱ	dh	dʱ	chw	tʃʷʰ	hh	x
my	mʲ	dw	dʷ	j	dʒ	hhw	xʷ
n	n	dy	dʲ	jh	dʒʱ	h	ɦ
nh	nʱ	tl	tɬ	jw	dʒʷ	hw	ɦʷ
nw	nʷ	tlh	tɬʰ	w	w	hy	ɦʲ
nhw	nʷʱ	tlw	tɬʷ	y	j		
ny	ɲ	tlhw	tɬʷʰ	wh	wʱ		
nyw	ɲʷ	dl	ɮ	yh	jʱ		
nʼ	ŋ	dlw	ɮʷ	yw	jʷ		
nʼh	ŋʱ	k	k				
nʼw	ŋʷ	kh	kʰ				
nʼhw	ŋʷʱ	kw	kʷ				
q	ᵏǀ	khw	kʷʰ				
qh	ᵏǀʰ	g	ɡ				
qhw	ᵏǀʷʰ	gh	ɡʱ				
gq	ᶢǀ	gw	ɡʷ				
gqw	ᶢǀʷ	ghw	ɡʷʱ				

== Phonology ==
Tsonga has a distinction between modal and breathy voiced consonants: /bʱ, bvʱ, vʱ, dʱ, ɖʐʱ, dʒʱ, ɡʱ/ vs /b, bv, v, d, ɖʐ, dʒ, ɡ/ among the obstruents (the one exception being /ɮ/), and /m̤, n̤, ŋ̤, r̤, j̤, w̤/ vs /m, n, ŋ, r, j, w/ among the sonorants (the one exception being /ɲ/). The segmental inventory is as follows:

=== Vowels ===
	Front	Central	Back
Close	i, (ĩ), iː		u, uː
Mid	ɛ, (ẽ), ɛː	(ə̃)	ɔ, ɔː
Open		a, ã, aː	

Long vowels are written double. Nasalised vowels are not distinguished in writing; [ĩ, ẽ, ə̃] are only found in words for 'yes' and 'no', while [ã] is found in a few mimetic words. Mid vowels can vary from close-mid to open-mid; they are generally close-mid [e, o] before a high vowel, /i/ or /u/, and low-mid [ɛ, ɔ] otherwise. Vowels may be realised as murmured [i̤, a̤] when following breathy consonants.

=== Consonants ===
		Bilabial		Labio- dental	Dental		Alveolar				Lateral		Post- alveolar		Velar		Glottal		
		plain	pal.	Labio- dental	plain	lab.	plain	lab.	pal.	wstld.	plain	lab.	plain	lab.	plain	lab.	plain	lab.	pal.
Click	voiceless				ᵏǀ														
Click	aspirated				ᵏǀʰ	ᵏǀʷʰ													
Click	voiced				ᶢǀ	ᶢǀʷ													
Nasal	voiced	m	mʲ				n	nʷ					ɲ	ɲʷ	ŋ	ŋʷ			
Nasal	breathy	mʱ					nʱ	nʷʱ							ŋʱ	ŋʷʱ			
Stop	voiceless	p	pʲ				t	tʷ	tʲ						k	kʷ			
Stop	aspirated	pʰ	pʲʰ				tʰ	tʷʰ	tʲʰ						kʰ	kʷʰ			
Stop	voiced	b	bʲ				d	dʷ	dʲ						ɡ	ɡʷ			
Stop	breathy	bʱ	bʲʱ				dʱ								ɡʱ	ɡʷʱ			
Affricate	voiceless			p̪f			ts	tsʷ		tsᶲ	tɬ	tɬʷ	tʃ	tʃʷ					
Affricate	aspirated			p̪fʰ			tsʰ	tsʷʰ		tsᶲʰ	tɬʰ	tɬʷʰ	tʃʰ	tʃʷʰ					
Affricate	voiced			b̪v			dz			dzᵝ	dɮ		dʒ	dʒʷ					
Affricate	breathy			b̪vʱ			dzʱ	dzʷʱ					dʒʱ						
Fricative	voiceless	ɸ		f			s	sʷ		sᶲ	ɬ	ɬʷ	ʃ	ʃʷ	x	xʷ			
Fricative	voiced	β		v			z	zʷ			ɮ	ɮʷ	ʒ				ɦ	ɦʷ	ɦʲ
Fricative	breathy			vʱ															
Trill	voiced						r	rʷ											
Trill	breathy						rʱ	rʷʱ											
Approximant	voiced										l	lʷ	j	jʷ		w			
Approximant	breathy												jʱ			wʱ			

Many of these consonants may be preceded by a nasal, but they are not prenasalised consonants: at least in word-initial position, they are nasal–obstruent sequences where the nasals are syllabic.

Different consonant sounds may alternate the place of articulation. A number of Tsonga speakers vary the affricates from alveolar [ts], [tsʰ], [dz], [dzʱ], [dzʷʱ] to retroflex [tʂ], [tʂʰ], [dʐ], [dʐʱ], [dʐʷʱ]; the latter are weakly whistled in Tsonga proper and in Changana dialect. Labiodental [ɱ] and dental [n̪] appear in homorganic consonant clusters.

Unlike some of the Nguni languages, Tsonga has very few words with click consonants, and these vary in place between dental [ᵏǀ], [ᵏǀʰ], [ᵏǀʷʰ], [ᶢǀ], [ᶢǀʷ] and postalveolar [ᵏ!], [ᵏ!ʰ], [ᵏ!ʷʰ], [ᶢ!], [ᶢ!ʷ]. Examples are: ngqondo (mind), gqoka (wear/dress), guqa (kneel), riqingo (phone), qiqi (earring), qamba (compose), Mugqivela (Saturday).

== Grammar ==
The grammar is generally typical of Bantu languages with a subject–verb–object order. The structure changes to subject—object—verb when addressing another person:

Tsonga	English
Ndza ku rhandza	I you love (I love you)
Wa ndzi rhandza	You love me
Ha ku tiva	We know you
Va ndzi tiva	They know me

=== Verbs ===
Almost all infinitives have the prefix ku- and end with -a.

Tsonga	English
ku chava	To fear
ku tsaka	To rejoice
ku rhandza	to love

The main exception to this is the verb ku ri – "to say" It corresponds to "ti" in many other Bantu languages. Examples of its usage include:
u ri yini? – What do you say? (What are you saying?)
ndzi ri ka n'wina – I say to you all.

In many instances the ri is often omitted and thus ku on its own can also mean "say".
Va ri ndza penga – They say I'm crazy.
Va ri yini? – What do they say? (What are they saying?)

Present tense
The present tense is formed by simply using the personal pronoun along with the verb.
Ndzi lava mali – I want money,
Hi tirha siku hinkwaro – We work all day,
Mi(u) lava mani? – Who are you looking for?
U kota ku famba – S/He knows how to walk.

Present progressive
Generally, to indicate ongoing actions in the present one takes the personal pronoun, drops the i and adds a.
Ndzi nghena (e)ndlwini – I am entering the house,
Ha tirha sweswi – We are working right now,
Ma hemba – You (plural) are lying,
Wa hemba – You (singular) are lying,
Wa hemba – S/He is lying,
With the plural va (they) there is no difference. Thus va hemba = "they lie" and "they are lying".

Past tense
This is formed in one of three ways, depending on the word.
(i) Generally, one drops the a from the verb and adds the prefix -ile
Ndzi nghenile ndlwini – I entered the house,
Hi tirhile siku hinkwaro – We worked all day,
U hembile – You lied,
U hembile – S/He lied,
Va hembile – They lied.

(ii) With verbs that end with -ala, the past tense changes to -ele or -ale.
ku rivala – to forget,
Ndzi rivele – I forgot, U rivele – you forgot, Va rivele – they forgot,
Ku nyamalala – To disappear,
U nyamalarile – S/He – disappeared,
Words used to describe a state of being also use the past tense.
Ku karhala – To be tired,
Ndzi karhele – I am tired, U karhele – S/He is tired, Va karhele – They are tired.

(iii) In many cases merely changing the last a in the verb to an e indicates past action.
Ku fika – To arrive,
U fike tolo – S/He arrived yesterday,
Ndzi fike tolo – I arrived yesterday,
Hi tirhe siku hinkwaro – We worked all day,
Ndzi nghene (e)ndlwini – I entered the house.

Future tense
This is formed by the adding ta in between the personal pronoun and the verb.
Ndzi ta nghena (e)ndlwini – I will enter the house,
Hi ta tirha siku hinkwaro – We will work all day,
Va ta tirha siku hinkwaro – They will work all day,
Mi ta tirha siku hinkwaro – You (plural) will work all day.

=== Noun classes ===
Tsonga has several classes, much like other Bantu languages, which are learned through memorisation mostly. These are:

Class	Prefix	Examples
1	mu-	mufana "boy", murhangeri "leader", munhu "person"
2	va-	vafana "boys", varhangeri "leaders", vanhu "people"
3	mu-, m-, n-	nseve "arrow", nenge "leg", nambu "river"
4	mi-	miseve "arrows", milenge "legs", milambu "rivers"
5	ri-, Ø-	tiko "country", rito "word", vito "name"
6	ma-	matiko "countries", marito "words", mavito "names"
7	xi-	Xikwembu "God", xilo "thing", xitulu "chair"
8	swi-	Swikwembu "gods", swilo "things", switulu "chairs"
9	yi(n)-, (n)-	yindlu "house", mbyana "dog", homu "cow"
10	tiyi(n), ti(n)-	tiyindlu "houses", timbyana "dogs", tihomu "cows"
11	ri-	rihlaya "jaw", rivambu "rib", rintiho "finger"
14	vu-	vutomi "life", vumunhu "humanness", vululami "righteousness"
15	ku-	ku tshembha "to trust", ku dya "to eat", ku biha "ugliness"
21	dyi-	dyimunhu "abnormally huge person", dyiyindlu "abnormally huge house"

- In classes 9 and 10, yi is present when the noun stem has one syllable, and is absent otherwise.

=== Personal pronouns ===
Personal pronouns in Tsonga are very similar to those of many other Bantu languages, with a few variations.

These may be classified as first person (the speaker), second person (the one spoken to), and third person (the one spoken about). They are also classified by grammatical number, i.e., singular and plural. There is no distinction between subject and object.

Each pronoun has a corresponding concord or agreement morpheme.

Personal pronouns
	1st sg.	2nd sg.	3rd sg.	1st pl.	2nd pl.	3rd pl.
Pronoun	mina	wena	yena	hina	n'wina	vona
Agreement morpheme	ndzi, ndza	u, wa	u, wa	hi, ha	mi, ma	va
Example sentences	Mina ndzi vona huku. ("I see a chicken."); Mina ndza yi vona huku. ("I see it—the chicken.")	Wena u vona huku. ("You see a chicken."); Wena wa yi vona huku. ("You see it—the chicken.")	Yena u vona huku. ("He/she sees a chicken."); Yena wa yi vona huku. ("He/she sees it—the chicken.")	Hina hi vona huku. ("We see a chicken."); Hina ha yi vona huku. ("We see it—the chicken.")	N'wina mi vona huku. ("You see a chicken."); N'wina ma yi vona huku. ("You see it—the chicken.")	Vona va vona huku. ("They see a chicken."); Vona va yi vona huku. ("They see it—the chicken.")

== Vocabulary ==
The vocabulary of Xitsonga is essentially similar not only to most South African languages but also other Eastern Bantu languages, for example, Kiswahili.

=== Numerals ===
Tsonga	English
N'we	one
Mbirhi	two
Nharhu	three
Mune	four
Ntlhanu	five
Ntsevu	six
Nkombo	seven
Nhungu	eight
Nkaye	nine
Khume	ten
Khume (na) n'we / Khumen'we	eleven
Khume (na) mbirhi / Khumembirhi	twelve
Khume (na) nharhu / Khumenharhu	thirteen
Mbirhi wa makhume / Makumembirhi	twenty
Makhume manharhu / Makumenharhu	thirty
Mune wa makhume / Makumemune	forty
Ntlhanu wa makhume / Makumentlhanu	fifty
Dzana	hundred
Gidi	thousand
Miliyoni	million

=== Months of the year ===
Tsonga	English
Sunguti	January
Nyenyenyani	February
Nyenyankulu	March
Dzivamisoko	April
Mudyaxihi	May
Khotavuxika	June
Mawuwani	July
Mhawuri	August
Ndzati	September
Nhlangula	October
Hukuri	November
N'wendzamhala	December

=== Borrowings ===
Tsonga, like many other African languages, have been influenced by various European colonial languages. Tsonga vocabulary includes words borrowed from English, Afrikaans, and Portuguese. Also, due to the assimilation of the Shangaan nation, it has taken some words from Nguni languages.

Words borrowed from English:

- Thelevhixini (Mavonakule) – television
- Rhediyo (Xiyanimoya) – Radio
- Xitulu – chair (Stool)
- Wachi (Xikomba-nkarhi) – watch (to tell time)
- Movha (Xipandza-mananga) – car (automobile)
- Sokisi – socks
- Nghilazi – glass
- Tliloko – clock(bell)
- Masipala – municipal (plural: vamasipala)
- Makhiya/swikhiya (Xilotlela) – keys

Words borrowed from Afrikaans:

- lekere – sweets (lekkers)
- fasitere – window (venster)
- lepula – spoon (lepel)
- kereke – church (kerk)
- buruku – trousers (broek)
- domu – idiot (dom)
- tafula – table (tafel)
- xipuku – ghost (spook)

Words borrowed from other Nguni languages:

- riqingho – phone
- ku qonda – to head towards (not standard = ku kongoma)
- ku gcina – to end (not standard = ku hetelela)
- ku zama – to try (not standard = ku ringeta)

== Writing system ==
=== Xitsonga Latin alphabet ===
Xitsonga uses the Latin alphabet. However, certain sounds are spelled using a combination of letters, which either do not exist in Indo-European languages, or may be meant to distinguish the language somewhat.

An example of this is the letter "x" taken from Portuguese orthography, which is pronounced /ʃ/. Therefore, the following words, [ʃuʃa], [ʃikolo], [ʃilo], are written in Tsonga as -xuxa, xikolo, and xilo.

Other spelling differences include the letter "c", which is pronounced /t͡ʃ/. However, where the emphasis of a word is on the following vowel the letter is hardened by adding "h" this the Tsonga word -chava (fear)

A sound equivalent to the Welsh "ll" (/ɬ/) is written "hl" in Tsonga, e.g. -hlangana (meet), -hlasela (attack), -hleka (laugh)

A whistling sound common in the language is written "sw" or "sv" in Zimbabwean ChiShona. This sound actually belongs to the "x-sw" class within the language. E.g.:

- sweswi (now)
- xilo (thing) – swilo (things)
- xikolo (school) – swikolo (schools)
- Xikwembu (God) – swikwembu (gods)

Another whistling sound is spelled "dy" but has no English equivalent, the closest being the "dr" sound in the English word "drive"

Xitsonga has been standardised as a written language. However, there are many dialects within the language that may not pronounce words as written. For example, the Tsonga bible uses the word byela (tell), pronounced bwe-la, however a large group of speakers would say "dzvela" instead.

The Lord's Prayer as written in the Xitsonga Bible (Bibele)

Tata wa hina la nge matilweni,
vito ra wena a ri hlawuriwe;
a ku te ku fuma ka wena;
ku rhandza ka wena a ku endliwe misaveni;
tani hi loko ku endliwa matilweni;
u hi nyika namuntlha vuswa bya hina
bya siku rin'wana ni rin'wana;
u hi rivalela swidyoho swa hina,
tani hi loko na hina hi rivalela lava hi dyohelaka;
u nga hi yisi emiringweni
kambe u hi ponisa eka Lowo biha,
hikuva ku fuma, ni matimba, ni ku twala i swa wena
hi masiku ni masiku.
Amen.

=== Xiyinhlanharhu xa Mipfawulo ===
The sintu writing system, Isibheqe Sohlamvu/Ditema tsa Dinoko, also known technically in Xitsonga as Xiyinhlanharhu xa Mipfawulo, is used for all Xitsonga varieties. The class 7/8 noun pairs above are represented as follows:

xilo	[ʃiːlɔ]	swilo	[ʂiːlɔ]
xikolo	[ʃikʼɔːlɔ]	swikolo	[ʂikʼɔːlɔ]
xikwembu	[ʃikʷʼɛmbu]	swikwembu	[ʂikʷʼɛmbu]

== Oral literature ==
=== Tales ===
E. Dora Earthy, a missionary in Mozambique, published a selection of Tsonga folktales (Lenge dialect) with facing-text English translations in the 1937 volume of the journal Folklore: Part 1 contains three stories and Part 2 contains an additional seven stories.

The organisation Aidglobal published a series of four children's books in Xichangana (one of Mozambique's Tsonga languages) in 2024 written by Venâncio Calisto and Mélio Tinga, and illustrated by Suzy Bila, Marisa Bimbo da Costa, Ruben Zacarias and Samuel Djive. The Xichangana/Portuguese translations were done by Williamo Muchanga.

=== Songs ===
Henri-Alexandre Junod included a selection of Tsonga song lyrics with English translations in his 1913 study, The Life of a South African Tribe.

For more recent studies of Tsonga music and songs, see the publications of Thomas Johnston in the 1970s, all of which include Tsonga song lyrics with English translations.

=== Riddles ===
Junod also included a selection of Tsonga riddles with English translations in The Life of a South African Tribe. Here are two of those riddles:

- "Tiban leshi, nambi mamana wa nwana a ku mu randja ngopfu, loko a tlhasa kaya a nga hluleka ka ku mu yamukela? Hi nyimba." "Guess what is it that a mother dearly loves but which could not run to meet her on her return home? The unborn babe in the womb."
- "Leshi, nambi wa ba, ntonsi wa kone wu nga boneki? I mati." "The thing which you can beat without leaving a scar? Water."

Following up on Junod's work on Tsonga riddles, J.E. Kaemmer has documented Tsonga "tone riddles," specifically the titekatekani of the Tswa people.

=== Proverbs ===
Here are some of the Tsonga proverbs which Junod recorded in The Life of a South African Tribe:

- "Mumiti wa nhengele a dumba nkolo wa kwe." "He who swallows a large stone has confidence in the size of his throat (i.e. applying to bumptious and pretentious folk)." (#1)
- "Tinhlange ta le ntjhaku ti tibyiwa hi mutlhabi." "The tattooing marks made on the back are known by the tattooer (not by the tattooed, i.e. you do not know what may happen when you have turned your back)." (#3)
- "Matimba ya ngwenya i mati." "The strength of the crocodile is water (i.e. when you are in your own domain you can succeed)." (#4)

Junod later published Quelques Proverbes Thonga, a booklet of Tsonga proverbs, in 1931.

Some additional Tsonga proverbs:

Tsonga	English	Meaning
N'wana wa mfenhe a nga tsandziwi hi rhavi.	The child of baboon does not fail a branch.	A wiseman's child can do anything.
U nga teki mali u bohela enengeni wa mpfuvu.	Do not tie money in the leg of hippopotamus.	Do not lend your money to people who do not pay back.
U nga dlayi nyoka u yi ndzuluta, ta micele ta ku vona.	Do not kill a snake and swing it, the ones inside the holes are watching you.	Do not do unnecessary bad things to someone, other people are watching you.
Kuwa ro tshwuka ri na xivungu endzeni.	A fig fruit which is pink, it has a worm inside.	Most of very beautiful women they have bad habits.
N'wana wa nyoka i nyoka.	The child of snake is a snake.	A child of a bad person, might be a very bad person.
Ndlopfu a yi fi hi ribambu rin'we.	An elephant does not die of one (broken) rib.	When in trouble, a man should try all efforts to find a solution.
Mbuti ya xihaha a yi tswaleli entlhambini.	A secretive goat does not give birth in a midst.	Keep a secret do not say it where there are many people.
N'hwarimbirhi yin'we yi ta tshwa nkanga.		If one tries to do more than one thing at the same time, one might not prosper.
N'wana wo ka a nga rili u ta fela a dzobyeni.	A child who does not cry will die unnoticed at the back of his mother.	If you do not raise your voice (in a form of a complaint), you will not be heard.
Mbuti yi dya laha yi nga bohiwa kona.	A goat eats where it is tied.	A person must use properties of a place where he is working.
Ku tlula ka mhala ku letela n'wana wa le ndzeni.	The way an impala jumps, it influences its unborn child.	Whatever bad things a mother does, her daughter will also do.
I malebvu ya nghala.	It is a lion's beard.	A thing may not be as scary as it looks.
Nomu a wu taleriwi hi nambu.	A mouth can cross any river.	A mouth can say all words of promises.
Mavoko ya munhu a ma mili nhova/byanyi.	Grass cannot grow on a human being's hands.	You must work hard (in every possible way) to succeed.
Xandla famba, xandla vuya.	Let the hand go and let the hand come back.	A giving hand is a receiving hand.
Humba yi olele nkuma.	The snail has collected ashes.	A person has died.
Mbyana loko yi lava ku ku luma ya n'wayitela.	A dog smiles when it intends to bite something.	A person can do (or intend to do) bad things to you, while he is smiling.
Ku hiwa hi Thomo ku suka e palamendhe ya le tilweni	To be given by Thomo (king's name) from heavenly parliament	To be blessed by God
Vana va munhu va tsemelana nhloko ya njiya.	Siblings are sharing the head of locust.	Siblings must share good things.
Mhunti yo tlulatlula Mangulwe u ta yi khoma.	An antelope which is jumping around next to Mangulwe (dog's name), he will catch it.	Any girl who has been seen by this boy, she will accept his proposal (used by a boy when he is in love with a girl).
Tolo a nga ha vuyi.	Yesterday will not come back.	Wishing to bring interesting old things of old days to nowadays.
Nghala yi vomba exihlahleni.	A lion roars in the bush.	A warrior is seen in a war.
Ku hundza muti ri xile.	To pass a home during the day	To be stupid
Tinghala timbirhi ta chavana.	Two lions fear each other.	Two powerful nations fear each other.
Timpfuvu timbirhi a ti tshami xidziveni xin'we.	Two hippos cannot stay in the same deep water.	Enemies cannot stay in the same place.
Vuhosi a byi peli nambu.	Chiefdom does not cross the river.	Chiefdom stays in the same family, cannot be passed to other families.
A ndzi ku hi laha ku nga na mpfula ku sala ndzhongo.	I thought is where the rain has poured and left fertile soil.	I thought it was good things.
I matutu vana va ntavasi.		It is plenty.
Ku tshwa nomo	To have a burnt mouth	Referring to someone who constantly lies, e.g. Jephrey Cuma u tshwe nomo.
N'wana u tseme mubya		A disobedient child
Mutlhontlhi wa tinyarhi ti vuya hi yena.	The one who challenges buffaloes they will chase him.	He who provokes other people, will face the consequences.
Loko u tsundzuka mhelembe khandziya ensinyeni.	When you think of rhino, climb a tree.	When you think of something, act immediately.
Ku ba ndlopfu hi xibakele	To hit an elephant with a fist	To make a very slight impression
Ku banana hi rhambu ra mfenhe	To hit each other with a baboon's bone	To exchange gifts with relatives only
Ku banana hi rhanga ro hisa	To hit each other with a hot 'pumpkin'	To accuse each other
U nga hlawuli nkuku wa mhangele.	One must not choose the male of the guinea-fowl (similar to "Don't count your chickens before they are hatched").	This proverb is said to a young husband who might be tempted to prepare something for their babies before their birth, since you do not know if the baby is a male or female.
Xihlovo a xi dungiwi loko u heta ku nwa mati.	Do not close the well after having drunk.	Do not mess up things after using them, you might need them tomorrow.
U nga sahi nsinya hi vuxika, u ta tshwa hi mumu hi malanga.	Do not cut the tree in winter, you will burn by sun in summer.	Do not mess up things when you do not need them, you will suffer when you need them.
Mhunti yi biwa ya ha ri na mahika.	An antelope is killed while is sighing.	A problem must be solved immediately.
Xirhami xi vuyisa na n'wana evukatini.	Chillness causes a girl to come back to her parents' house from her husband's house.	It is very cold.
