= Shiluvane =

Shiluvana
- Location within Limpopo Location within South Africa
- Coordinates: 24.040°S 30.280°E
- Country: South Africa
- Province: Limpopo
- District: Mopani
- Municipality: Greater Tzaneen

Area
  - Total: 4.63 km^{2} (1.79 sq mi)

Population (2011)
  - Total: 2,049
  - Density: 443/km^{2} (1,150/sq mi)

Racial makeup (2011)
  - Black African: 99.3%
  - Coloured: 0.1%
  - Indian/Asian: 0.2%
  - White: 0.3%

First languages (2011)
  - Northern Sotho: 57.3%
  - Tsonga: 38.4%
  - Venda: 1.2%
  - Other: 3.1%
- Time zone: UTC+2 (SAST)
- Postal code (street): 0873
- PO box: 0873

Shiluvana is a settlement in Mopani District Municipality in the Limpopo province of South Africa. It is situated 36 km (22 mi) from Tzaneen town. It is the birthplace of Hudson William Edison Ntsanwisi, the former Chief Minister of the Gazankulu bantustan, whose parents' graves are also in Shiluvana village.. It is also the birthplace of actor and businessman Fumani Shilubana.
